= List of Germany national rugby union team results =

The Germany national rugby union team is the national team of the third-tier rugby union-playing nation Germany. They first played in 1927 and have yet to qualify for the Rugby World Cup. Rugby union in Germany is administered by the Deutscher Rugby-Verband. The German National Team regularly compete in the European Nations Cup, the senior men's rugby tournament for European nations below the Six Nations. Following victory in Division 2A of that tournament in 2006–08, Germany competed in Division One, the top tier of the European Nations Cup for 2008-10 but was relegated again immediately.

This is a list of games played by the German team against other nations and selections. Non-national team selections like second or amateur teams are distinguished by XV behind the union's name.

== Internationals ==
Germany's results according to the German Rugby Federation:

=== 1920s ===
Date	Location	Opposition	Result	Tournament
17 April 1927	Paris	France	5–30	Friendly
15 May 1927	**Frankfurt am Main**	France	**17–16**	Friendly
18 March 1928	**Hannover**	France	3–14	Friendly
28 April 1929	Paris	France	0–24	Friendly
9 June 1929	Barcelona	Spain	**24–15**	Friendly as part of the Expo '29

=== 1930s ===
Date	Location	Opposition	Result	Tournament
6 April 1930	**Berlin**	France	0–31	Friendly
18 May 1930	**Dresden**	Spain	**5–0**	Friendly
19 April 1931	Paris	France	0–34	Friendly
8 November 1931	**Leipzig**	Czechoslovakia	**38–0**	Friendly
17 April 1932	Frankfurt am Main	France	4–20	Friendly
26 March 1933	Paris	France	17–38	Friendly
3 December 1933	**Düsseldorf**	Netherlands	**23–0**	Friendly
25 March 1934	**Hannover**	France	9–13	Friendly
6 May 1934	Prague	Czechoslovakia	**19–9**	Friendly
2 December 1934	Maastricht	Netherlands	**21–0**	Friendly
24 March 1935	Paris	France	3–18	Friendly
17 November 1935	**Cologne**	Netherlands	**11–5**	Friendly
14 May 1936	**Berlin**	Italy	**19–8**	1936 FIRA Tournament also European Nations Cup 1936
17 May 1936	**Berlin**	France	14–19	1936 FIRA Tournament also European Nations Cup 1936
20 May 1936	**Hamburg**	Romania	**37–9**	Friendly
1 November 1936	**Hannover**	France	3–6	Friendly
15 November 1936	Hilversum	Netherlands	**28–16**	Friendly
1 January 1937	Milan	Italy	**6–3**	Friendly
18 April 1937	Paris	France	6–27	Friendly
14 October 1937	Paris	Italy	7–9	Expo '37 also 1937 FIRA Tournament
16 October 1937	Paris	Romania	**30–3**	Expo '37 also 1937 FIRA Tournament
31 October 1937	**Düsseldorf**	Belgium	**34–6**	Friendly
6 March 1938	**Stuttgart**	Italy	**10–0**	Friendly
27 March 1938	Frankfurt am Main	France	**3–0**	Friendly
19 May 1938	Bucharest	Romania	**8–5**	1938 FIRA Tournament
22 May 1938	Bucharest	France	5–8	1938 FIRA Tournament
11 February 1939	Milan	Italy	**12–3**	Friendly

=== 1940s ===
Date	Location	Opposition	Result	Tournament
5 May 1940	Stuttgart	Italy	0–4	Friendly

=== 1950s ===
Date	Location	Opposition	Result	Tournament
2 March 1952	**Hannover**	Belgium	**16–9**	1952 Rugby Union European Cup
27 April 1952	Padua	Italy	6–14	1952 Rugby Union European Cup
27 December 1952	Madrid	Spain	**17–6**	Friendly
17 May 1953	**Hannover**	Italy	3–21	Friendly
21 March 1954	**Frankfurt am Main**	Spain	6–6	Friendly
28 March 1954	Grenoble	France XV	3–25	Friendly
18 April 1954	Parma	France XV	3–28	1954 Rugby Union European Cup
13 March 1955	Milan	Italy	8–24	Friendly
10 April 1955	**Hannover**	France XV	0–16	Friendly
25 March 1956	**Heidelberg**	Italy	3–12	Friendly
1 April 1956	Toulon	France XV	6–32	Friendly
21 May 1956	Huy	Belgium	**16–0**	Friendly
1 September 1956	Cardiff	Cardiff	0–25	Friendly
24 March 1957	**Berlin**	France XV	3–11	Friendly
14 April 1957	**Cologne**	Belgium	**33–3**	Friendly
5 May 1957	Brno	Czechoslovakia	3–9	Friendly
1 December 1957	Barcelona	Spain	**16–3**	Friendly
12 December 1957	Milan	Italy	0–8	Friendly
30 March 1958	Nantes	France XV	6–6	Friendly
27 April 1958	**Hannover**	Czechoslovakia	0–11	Friendly
4 May 1958	Brussels	Romania	0–9	Expo 58
20 October 1958	Kraków	Poland	**11–3**	Friendly
16 November 1958	Eindhoven	Netherlands	**24–0**	Friendly
15 March 1959	**Heidelberg**	Spain	**19–14**	Friendly
30 March 1959	**Hannover**	France XV	0–27	Friendly
13 September 1959	**Heidelberg**	Netherlands	**39–0**	Friendly
16 October 1959	Liège	Belgium	**8–6**	Friendly
24 October 1959	**Braunschweig**	Poland	8–9	Friendly

=== 1960s ===
Date	Location	Opposition	Result	Tournament
10 April 1960	**Hannover**	Italy	5–11	Friendly
17 April 1960	Clermont-Ferrand	France XV	6–14	Friendly
24 April 1960	Barcelona	Spain	3–9	Friendly
9 October 1960	Breukelen	Netherlands	**42–6**	Friendly
16 October 1960	Rzeszów	Poland	**8–3**	Friendly
15 January 1961	Piacenza	Italy	0–19	Friendly
2 April 1961	**Heidelberg**	France XV	9–27	Friendly
1 October 1961	**Hannover**	Poland	**11–3**	Friendly
29 October 1961	**Offenbach**	Belgium	**52–3**	Friendly
15 April 1962	**Hannover**	Spain	**14–6**	Friendly
22 April 1962	Dijon	France XV	11–53	Friendly
27 May 1962	**Berlin**	Italy	11–13	Friendly
20 October 1962	Tienen	Belgium	**50–3**	Friendly
21 October 1962	The Hague	Netherlands	37–6	Friendly
14 April 1963	Frankfurt am Main	France XV	9–16	Friendly
16 June 1963	Prague	Czechoslovakia	**6–3**	Friendly
13 October 1963	**Rüsselsheim**	Netherlands	12–13	Friendly
22 March 1964	Bologna	Italy	3–17	Friendly
29 March 1964	Vichy	France XV	3–34	Friendly
11 October 1964	The Hague	Netherlands	**18–5**	Friendly
31 October 1964	**Hürth**	Belgium	**11–3**	Friendly
15 November 1964	Bucharest	Romania	3–19	Friendly
17 April 1965	**Hannover**	France XV	3–8	Friendly
10 October 1965	**Berlin**	Netherlands	**48–8**	Friendly
17 October 1965	**Michelstadt**	Czechoslovakia	25–6	1965–1966 FIRA Nations Cup
14 November 1965	**Hannover**	Romania	8–9	1965–1966 FIRA Nations Cup
10 April 1966	Chalon-sur-Saône	France XV	6–8	1965–1966 FIRA Nations Cup
23 October 1966	The Hague	Netherlands	**12–0**	Friendly
30 October 1966	**Berlin**	Italy	3–3	1965–1966 FIRA Nations Cup
26 March 1967	**Hamburg**	France XV	0–22	Friendly
15 October 1967	**Hannover**	Netherlands	**6–0**	Friendly
29 October 1967	Bucharest	Romania	5–27	1967–1968 FIRA Nations Cup
22 November 1967	Prague	Czechoslovakia	6–9	1967–1968 FIRA Nations Cup
14 April 1968	Lons-le-Saunier	France XV	8–26	1967–1968 FIRA Nations Cup
12 October 1968	The Hague	Netherlands	**11–0**	Friendly
3 November 1968	Venice	Italy	14–22	Friendly
5 April 1969	**Cologne**	France XV	6–20	1968–1969 FIRA Nations Cup
12 October 1969	**Offenbach**	Netherlands	**14–13**	Friendly
26 October 1969	**Hamburg**	Czechoslovakia	11–18	1968–1969 FIRA Nations Cup
9 November 1969	**Hannover**	Romania	3–6	1968–1969 FIRA Nations Cup
30 November 1969	Le Creusot	France XV	6–33	Friendly

=== 1970s ===
Date	Location	Opposition	Result	Tournament
24 October 1970	The Hague	Netherlands	**29–3**	Friendly
21 November 1970	**Heidelberg**	France XV	3–18	Friendly
16 October 1971	**Bonn**	Netherlands	**14–9**	Friendly
17 October 1971	Liège	Belgium	**27–9**	Friendly
26 March 1972	Besançon	France XV	9–35	Friendly
21 October 1972	Apeldoorn	Netherlands	**17–13**	Friendly
22 October 1972	**Bonn**	Belgium	**28–3**	Friendly
28 October 1972	Ostrava	Czechoslovakia	3–47	Friendly
12 November 1972	Bucharest	Romania	**11–10**	Friendly
26 November 1972	**Hannover**	France XV	0–11	Friendly
20 October 1973	Verviers	Belgium	**20–9**	Friendly
27 October 1973	**Heidelberg**	Romania	9–33	Friendly
10 November 1973	Le Creusot	France XV	0–31	Friendly
7 April 1974	**Hannover**	Portugal	**20–10**	1973–1974 FIRA Trophy – Group B
1 May 1974	Makarska	Yugoslavia	**20–8**	1973–1974 FIRA Trophy – Group B
5 May 1974	Rho	Italy	10–16	1973–1974 FIRA Trophy – Group B
25 May 1974	**Hannover**	Czechoslovakia	6–6	1973–1974 FIRA Trophy – Group B
19 October 1974	Wageningen	Netherlands	21–32	1974–1975 FIRA Trophy – Group B
20 October 1974	**Varel**	Belgium	**24–3**	Friendly
13 April 1975	**Heidelberg**	Morocco	**19–11**	1974–1975 FIRA Trophy – Group B
4 May 1975	Warsaw	Poland	6–29	1974–1975 FIRA Trophy – Group B
26 October 1975	**Hannover**	Belgium	**43–3**	1975–1976 FIRA Trophy – Group B
9 November 1975	**Heidelberg**	France XV	12–24	Friendly
28 March 1976	Casablanca	Morocco	3–30	1975–1976 FIRA Trophy – Group B
6 November 1976	Říčany	Czechoslovakia	6–22	1976–1977 FIRA Trophy – Group B
21 November 1976	**Hannover**	Netherlands	13–13	1976–1977 FIRA Trophy – Group B
20 February 1977	Auxerre	France XV	3–50	Friendly
17 April 1977	**Hannover**	Soviet Union	16–22	1976–1977 FIRA Trophy – Group B
8 May 1977	Stockholm	Sweden	**32–9**	1976–1977 FIRA Trophy – Group B
23 October 1977	Hilversum	Netherlands	9–10	1977–1978 FIRA Trophy – Group B
30 October 1977	**Berlin**	Sweden	11–16	1977–1978 FIRA Trophy – Group B
7 May 1978	Kharkov	Soviet Union	9–64	1977–1978 FIRA Trophy – Group B
28 October 1978	Geneva	Switzerland	**18–0**	1978–1979 FIRA Trophy – Group B
8 April 1979	**Hannover**	Morocco	6–13	1978–1979 FIRA Trophy – Group B
20 October 1979	Stockholm	Sweden	**10–4**	1979–1980 FIRA Trophy – Group B
11 November 1979	**Hannover**	Czechoslovakia	6–27	Friendly
25 November 1979	**Heidelberg**	Spain	0–13	1979–1980 FIRA Trophy – Group B

=== 1980s ===
Date	Location	Opposition	Result	Tournament
30 March 1980	Hilversum	Netherlands	10–16	1979–1980 FIRA Trophy – Group B
30 May 1980	**Hannover**	Yugoslavia	6–6	1979–1980 FIRA Trophy – Group B
16 November 1980	**Hannover**	Netherlands	**13–10**	1980–1981 FIRA Trophy – Group B
30 November 1980	Kardeljevo	Yugoslavia	**16–0**	1980–1981 FIRA Trophy – Group B
29 March 1981	**Heidelberg**	Tunisia	**30–9**	1980–1981 FIRA Trophy – Group B
12 April 1981	Casablanca	Morocco	6–22	1980–1981 FIRA Trophy – Group B
1 November 1981	**Hannover**	Soviet Union	**10–7**	1981–1982 FIRA Trophy – Group A
29 November 1981	Rovigo	Italy	0–23	1981–1982 FIRA Trophy – Group A
21 March 1982	**Heidelberg**	France XV	15–53	1981–1982 FIRA Trophy – Group A
4 April 1982	Bucharest	Romania	18–60	1981–1982 FIRA Trophy – Group A
24 October 1982	Moscow	Soviet Union	9–31	1982–1983 FIRA Trophy – Group A
7 November 1982	**Hannover**	Italy	3–23	1982–1983 FIRA Trophy – Group A
20 February 1983	Bourg-en-Bresse	France XV	0–84	1982–1983 FIRA Trophy – Group A
27 March 1983	**Heidelberg**	Romania	12–26	1982–1983 FIRA Trophy – Group A
8 May 1983	**Hannover**	Morocco	13–16	1982–1983 FIRA Trophy – Group A
25 June 1983	**Heidelberg**	Soviet Union	9–37	Friendly
29 October 1983	Tunis	Tunisia	9–23	1983–1984 FIRA Trophy – Group B2
13 November 1983	**Hannover**	Yugoslavia	**38–0**	1983–1984 FIRA Trophy – Group B2
15 April 1984	**Heidelberg**	Czechoslovakia	3–15	1983–1984 FIRA Trophy – Group B2
5 May 1984	Norrköping	Sweden	13–15	1983–1984 FIRA Trophy – Group B2
4 November 1984	**Hannover**	Netherlands	10–23	1984–1985 FIRA Trophy – Group C
31 March 1985	**Heidelberg**	Switzerland	**30–12**	Friendly
4 May 1985	Karlskrona	Sweden	**18–6**	1984–1985 FIRA Trophy – Group C
5 May 1985	Copenhagen	Denmark	**21–4**	Friendly
10 November 1985	**Hannover**	Spain	**13–11**	1985–1987 FIRA Trophy – Group B1
23 November 1985	**Essen**	Denmark	**15–0**	Friendly
1 December 1985	Geneva	Switzerland	**18–10**	Friendly
13 April 1986	Poznań	Poland	12–28	1985–1987 FIRA Trophy – Group B1
27 April 1986	**Heidelberg**	Morocco	**6–0**	1985–1987 FIRA Trophy – Group B1
29 November 1986	Madrid	Spain	0–50	1985–1987 FIRA Trophy – Group B1
5 April 1987	Casablanca	Morocco	0–7	1985–1987 FIRA Trophy – Group B1
10 May 1987	**Hannover**	Poland	6–20	1985–1987 FIRA Trophy – Group B1
27 September 1987	Hundested	Denmark	**20–3**	Friendly
15 November 1987	**Berlin**	Belgium	21–24	1987–1989 FIRA Trophy – Group B2
29 November 1987	Split	Yugoslavia	**15–6**	1987–1989 FIRA Trophy – Group B2
20 March 1988	**Heidelberg**	Netherlands	**6–3**	1987–1989 FIRA Trophy – Group B2
17 April 1988	Arcos de Valdevez	Portugal	9–13	1987–1989 FIRA Trophy – Group B2
20 November 1988	**Hannover**	Yugoslavia	**26–9**	1987–1989 FIRA Trophy – Group B2
10 December 1988	Brussels	Belgium	**16–7**	1987–1989 FIRA Trophy – Group B2
16 April 1989	Hilversum	Netherlands	13–21	1987–1989 FIRA Trophy – Group B2
30 April 1989	**Hannover**	Portugal	**30–15**	1987–1989 FIRA Trophy – Group B2
17 September 1989	**Heidelberg**	Netherlands	6–12	1989–1990 FIRA Trophy – Group B2
30 September 1989	**Bonn**	Samoa	9–55	Friendly

=== 1990s ===
Date	Location	Opposition	Result	Tournament
18 March 1990	Madrid	Spain	8–19	1989–1990 FIRA Trophy – Group B2
22 April 1990	Sofia	Bulgaria	**44–12**	1989–1990 FIRA Trophy – Group B2
5 May 1990	**Hannover**	Czechoslovakia	**32–7**	1989–1990 FIRA Trophy – Group B2
21 July 1990	Windhoek	Namibia	7–54	Friendly ^{1}
25 November 1990	**Hannover**	Belgium	7–7	1990–1992 FIRA Trophy – Group B1
28 April 1991	Hilversum	Netherlands	4–17	1990–1992 FIRA Trophy – Group B1 ^{2}
19 May 1991	**Heidelberg**	Poland	**6–0**	1990–1992 FIRA Trophy – Group B1
3 November 1991	Gdańsk	Poland	**10–6**	1990–1992 FIRA Trophy – Group B1
28 March 1992	**Hannover**	Netherlands	**7–3**	1990–1992 FIRA Trophy – Group B1
11 April 1992	Brussels	Belgium	10–17	1990–1992 FIRA Trophy – Group B1
24 October 1992	Moscow	Russia	10–13	1992-1993 FIRA Preliminary Tournament – Pool A
15 November 1992	**Stuttgart**	Belgium	**13–10**	1992-1993 FIRA Preliminary Tournament – Pool A
17 April 1993	Casablanca	Morocco	3–23	1992-1993 FIRA Preliminary Tournament – Pool A
1 May 1993	**Berlin**	Lithuania	**31–5**	1995 Rugby World Cup qualifying
8 May 1993	Riga	Latvia	**27–5**	1995 Rugby World Cup qualifying
30 May 1993	**Hannover**	France XV	27–71	1992-1993 FIRA Preliminary Tournament – Pool A
2 October 1993	Tunis	Tunisia	6–15	1992–1994 FIRA Trophy – Group A2
10 October 1993	Delft	Netherlands	10–20	Friendly
21 November 1993	**Heusenstamm**	Belgium	**32–16**	1992–1994 FIRA Trophy – Group A2
26 March 1994	**Hannover**	Morocco	**35–18**	1992–1994 FIRA Trophy – Group A2
17 April 1994	Lisbon	Portugal	**20–18**	1992–1994 FIRA Trophy – Group A2
2 May 1994	Bucharest	Romania	6–60	1995 Rugby World Cup qualifying
4 May 1994	Bucharest	Russia	5–67	1995 Rugby World Cup qualifying
23 October 1994	Ricany	Czech Republic	5–12	FIRA Trophy – Group A2
13 November 1994	**Hannover**	Spain	10–29	FIRA Trophy – Group A2
8 December 1994	Arlon	Belgium	12–14	FIRA Trophy – Group A2
6 May 1995	Oujda	Morocco	6–21	Friendly
14 May 1995	**Heidelberg**	Portugal	16–26	FIRA Trophy – Group A2
23 September 1995	**Hannover**	Czech Republic	**28–17**	FIRA Trophy – Group B1
15 October 1995	Tbilisi	Georgia	3–14	FIRA Trophy – Group B1
21 April 1996	Hilversum	Netherlands	5–6	FIRA Trophy – Group B1
12 May 1996	**Hannover**	Denmark	**16–11**	FIRA Trophy – Group B1
16 November 1996	Brussels	Belgium	3–24	FIRA Trophy – Pool A
24 November 1996	**Heidelberg**	Spain	17–25	FIRA Trophy – Pool A
20 April 1997	Aalborg	Denmark	**13–8**	FIRA Trophy – Play-off 9th – 12th
10 May 1997	Prague	Czech Republic	**14–9**	FIRA Trophy – Play-off 9th – 10th
4 October 1997	Andorra la Vella	Andorra	**54–11**	1999 Rugby World Cup – European qualification
19 October 1997	**Hannover**	Czech Republic	**31–17**	1999 Rugby World Cup – European qualification
28 March 1998	Amsterdam	Netherlands	24–38	Friendly
4 April 1998	Lisbon	Portugal	6–30	1999 Rugby World Cup – European qualification
26 April 1998	**Heidelberg**	Spain	9–24	1999 Rugby World Cup – European qualification
11 October 1998	**Hannover**	Tunisia	**13–6**	FIRA – Pool C
25 October 1998	**Heusenstamm**	Luxembourg	**54–7**	FIRA – Pool C
25 April 1999	**Heidelberg**	Belgium	**27–17**	FIRA – Pool C
17 October 1999	**Gera**	Namibia	13–79	Friendly

- ^{1} Not recognised by Namibia as an official test match.
- ^{2} Points awarded to Germany due to Netherlands using an ineligible player.

=== 2000s ===
Date	Location	Opposition	Result	Tournament	Report
2 April 2000	Odesa	Ukraine	17–20	European Nations Cup Second Division 2000	
16 April 2000	Krasnodar	Russia	6–89	European Nations Cup Second Division 2000	
1 May 2000	**Rottweil**	Croatia	11–40	European Nations Cup Second Division 2000	
7 May 2000	**Varel**	Denmark	19–39	European Nations Cup Second Division 2000	
21 October 2000	**Berlin**	Poland	13–26	2001 European Nations Cup Second Division	
12 November 2000	**Heusenstamm**	Ukraine	12–19	2001 European Nations Cup Second Division	
8 April 2001	**Konstanz**	Czech Republic	**30–17**	2001 European Nations Cup Second Division	
28 April 2001	Copenhagen	Denmark	**21–10**	2001 European Nations Cup Second Division	
20 May 2001	Split	Croatia	14–14	2001 European Nations Cup Second Division	
21 October 2001	Malmö	Sweden	10–32	2003 Rugby World Cup – European qualification	
10 November 2001	**Heidelberg**	Denmark	**34–24**	2003 Rugby World Cup – European qualification	
24 November 2001	**Hannover**	Latvia	**44–0**	2003 Rugby World Cup – European qualification	
6 April 2002	Gdynia	Poland	12–20	2003 Rugby World Cup – European qualification	
24 November 2002	**Heidelberg**	Ukraine	26–26	2002–2004 European Nations Cup Second Division Pool A	
9 March 2003	**Hannover**	Netherlands	**15–3**	2002–2004 European Nations Cup Second Division Pool A	
29 March 2003	Gdynia	Poland	**37–15**	2002–2004 European Nations Cup Second Division Pool A	
27 April 2003	Trelleborg	Sweden	**24–16**	2002–2004 European Nations Cup Second Division Pool A	
12 October 2003	Kyiv	Ukraine	3–6	2002–2004 European Nations Cup Second Division Pool A	
10 April 2004	Amsterdam	Netherlands	13–14	2002–2004 European Nations Cup Second Division Pool A	
25 April 2004	**Hannover**	Sweden	**40–0**	2002–2004 European Nations Cup Second Division Pool A	
16 May 2004	**Heidelberg**	Poland	**34–10**	2002–2004 European Nations Cup Second Division Pool A	
13 November 2004	Chișinău	Moldova	**27–18**	2007 Rugby World Cup – Europe qualification, Round 2	
27 November 2004	**Heidelberg**	Luxembourg	**96–0**	2007 Rugby World Cup – Europe qualification, Round 2	
2 April 2005	**Heidelberg**	Denmark	**56–0**	2007 Rugby World Cup – Europe qualification, Round 2	
23 April 2005	Vienna	Austria	**69–9**	2007 Rugby World Cup – Europe qualification, Round 2	
29 October 2005	Marsa	Malta	**43–0**	2007 Rugby World Cup – Europe qualification, Round 3	
12 November 2005	**Heidelberg**	Serbia and Montenegro	**108–0**	2007 Rugby World Cup – Europe qualification, Round 3	
1 April 2006	**Brandenburg**	Welsh Districts XV	**36–16**	Friendly	
22 April 2006	Zagreb	Croatia	**25–15**	2007 Rugby World Cup – Europe qualification, Round 3	
29 April 2006	**Hannover**	Belgium	**33–15**	2007 Rugby World Cup – Europe qualification, Round 3	Line up
13 May 2006	**Heidelberg**	Spain	**18–6**	2007 Rugby World Cup – Europe qualification, Play-Off	Line up
27 May 2006	Madrid	Spain	10–36	2007 Rugby World Cup – Europe qualification, Play-Off	Line up
16 September 2006	Bern	Switzerland	**40–10**	Friendly	
11 November 2006	Chişinău	Moldova	24–26	2006-2008 European Nations Cup Second Division	Line up Report
18 November 2006	**Heidelberg**	Belgium	**32–13**	2006-2008 European Nations Cup Second Division	Line up Report
24 February 2007	Pontypridd	Welsh Districts XV	**24–13**	Friendly	Line up
21 April 2007	Kyiv	Ukraine	**22–14**	2006-2008 European Nations Cup Second Division	Line up Report
28 April 2007	**Hannover**	Netherlands	**21–12**	2006-2008 European Nations Cup Second Division	Line up Report
29 September 2007	**Frankfurt am Main**	Switzerland	**49–13**	Friendly	Line up
10 November 2007	Brussels	Belgium	18–32	2006-2008 European Nations Cup Second Division	Line up Report
24 November 2007	**Heidelberg**	Moldova	**34–5**	2006-2008 European Nations Cup Second Division	Line up Report
19 April 2008	**Hannover**	Ukraine	**13–5**	2006-2008 European Nations Cup Second Division	Line up Report
26 April 2008	Amsterdam	Netherlands	**27–17**	2006-2008 European Nations Cup Second Division	Line up Report
8 November 2008	**Berlin**	Welsh Districts XV	14–27	Friendly	Line up
15 November 2008	Madrid	Spain	11–22	2008-2010 European Nations Cup First Division also 2011 Rugby World Cup – Europe qualification	Line up Report
7 February 2009	**Heidelberg**	Georgia	5–38	2008-2010 European Nations Cup First Division also 2011 Rugby World Cup – Europe qualification	Line up Report
14 February 2009	**Heidelberg**	Romania	0–22	2008-2010 European Nations Cup First Division also 2011 Rugby World Cup – Europe qualification	Line up Report
21 February 2009	Lisbon	Portugal	6–44	2008-2010 European Nations Cup First Division also 2011 Rugby World Cup – Europe qualification	Line up
2 May 2009	**Hannover**	Russia	0–53	2008-2010 European Nations Cup First Division also 2011 Rugby World Cup – Europe qualification	Line up Report
12 December 2009	**Heidelberg**	Hong Kong	**24–14**	Friendly	Line up

=== 2010s ===
Date	Location	Opposition	Result	Tournament	Report
6 February 2010	Tbilisi	Georgia	3–77	2008-2010 European Nations Cup First Division also 2011 Rugby World Cup – Europe qualification	Line up Report
13 February 2010	Constanţa	Romania	5–67	2008-2010 European Nations Cup First Division also 2011 Rugby World Cup – Europe qualification	Line up Report
27 February 2010	**Heusenstamm**	Portugal	0–69	2008-2010 European Nations Cup First Division also 2011 Rugby World Cup – Europe qualification	Line up Report
12 March 2010	Sochi	Russia	11–48	2008-2010 European Nations Cup First Division also 2011 Rugby World Cup – Europe qualification	Line up Report
20 March 2010	**Heidelberg**	Spain	17–21	2008-2010 European Nations Cup First Division also 2011 Rugby World Cup – Europe qualification	Line up
20 November 2010	**Frankfurt am Main**	Poland	17–22	2010–12 European Nations Cup First Division	Report
27 November 2010	Amsterdam	Netherlands	**29–10**	2010–12 European Nations Cup First Division	Report
11 December 2010	**Heidelberg**	Hong Kong	**34–13**	Friendly	Report
12 March 2011	**Heidelberg**	Czech Republic	23–29	2010–12 European Nations Cup First Division	Report
19 March 2011	Brussels	Belgium	25–28	2010–12 European Nations Cup First Division	Report
2 April 2011	Chişinău	Moldova	15–28	2010–12 European Nations Cup First Division	Report
12 November 2011	**Hannover**	Netherlands	**23–7**	2010–12 European Nations Cup First Division	Report
19 November 2011	Gdańsk	Poland	8–34	2010–12 European Nations Cup First Division	Report
10 March 2012	Prague	Czech Republic	**20–17**	2010–12 European Nations Cup First Division	Report
17 March 2012	**Heusenstamm**	Belgium	29–30	2010–12 European Nations Cup First Division	Report
24 March 2012	**Heidelberg**	Moldova	**40–7**	2010–12 European Nations Cup First Division	Report
27 October 2012	**Berlin**	Ukraine	**46–28**	2012–14 European Nations Cup First Division	Report
3 November 2012	Gdańsk	Poland	13–22	2012–14 European Nations Cup First Division	Report
17 November 2012	**Heidelberg**	Moldova	**32–14**	2012–14 European Nations Cup First Division	Report
9 March 2013	Prague	Czech Republic	**27–8**	2012–14 European Nations Cup First Division	Report
6 April 2013	**Hamburg**	Sweden	**73–17**	2012–14 European Nations Cup First Division	Report
26 October 2013	Kharkiv	Ukraine	**28–16**	2012–14 European Nations Cup First Division	Report
9 November 2013	**Berlin**	Poland	**43–13**	2012–14 European Nations Cup First Division	Report
16 November 2013	Chișinău	Moldova	15–30	2012–14 European Nations Cup First Division	Report
5 April 2014	**Heidelberg**	Czech Republic	**76–12**	2012–14 European Nations Cup First Division	Report
26 April 2014	Stockholm	Sweden	**45–20**	2012–14 European Nations Cup First Division	Report
10 May 2014	Amsterdam	Netherlands	**17–7**	2015 Rugby World Cup – Europe qualification	Report
24 May 2014	**Hamburg**	Russia	20–31	2015 Rugby World Cup – Europe qualification	Report
29 October 2014	Windhoek	Namibia	20–58	Friendly	
7 February 2015	**Heusenstamm**	Georgia	8–64	2014–16 European Nations Cup First Division	Report
14 February 2015	**Pforzheim**	Russia	22–46	2014–16 European Nations Cup First Division	Report
28 February 2015	Lisbon	Portugal	3–11	2014–16 European Nations Cup First Division	Report
14 March 2015	**Heidelberg**	Romania	12–17	2014–16 European Nations Cup First Division	Report
21 March 2015	Madrid	Spain	16–48	2014–16 European Nations Cup First Division	Report
28 November 2015	Blumenau	Brazil	**29–12**	Friendly	Report
4 December 2015	São Paulo	Brazil	**31–7**	Friendly	
6 February 2016	Tbilisi	Georgia	7–59	2014–16 European Nations Cup First Division	Report
13 February 2016	Sochi	Russia	20–46	2014–16 European Nations Cup First Division	Report
27 February 2016	**Hanover**	Portugal	**50–27**	2014–16 European Nations Cup First Division	Report
12 March 2016	Iași	Romania	7–61	2014–16 European Nations Cup First Division	Report
19 March 2016	**Cologne**	Spain	17–17	2014–16 European Nations Cup First Division	Report
12 November 2016	**Frankfurter Volksbank Stadion**; **Frankfurt am Main**	Uruguay	**24–21**	Friendly	Report
19 November 2016	**Fritz-Grunebaum-Sportpark**; **Heidelberg**	Brazil	**16–6**	Friendly	Report
26 November 2016	**Bruno-Plache-Stadion**; **Leipzig**	Brazil	**36–14**	Friendly	Report
11 February 2017	**Sparda-Bank-Hessen-Stadion**; **Offenbach am Main**	Romania	**41–38**	2017 Rugby Europe Championship	Report
19 February 2017	Rustavi	Georgia	6–50	2017 Rugby Europe Championship	Report
4 March 2017	**Sparda-Bank-Hessen-Stadion**; **Offenbach am Main**	Belgium	**34–29**	2017 Rugby Europe Championship	Report
11 March 2017	**Sportpark Höhenberg**; **Cologne**	Spain	15–32	2017 Rugby Europe Championship	Report
19 March 2017	Sochi	Russia	25–52	2017 Rugby Europe Championship	Report
28 May 2017	Nairobi	Kenya	**30–29**	Friendly	Report
11 November 2017	**Bruno-Plache-Stadion**; **Leipzig**	Brazil	**45–12**	Friendly	Report
18 November 2017	**Brita-Arena**; **Wiesbaden**	United States	17–46	Friendly	Report
25 November 2017	Sparda-Bank-Hessen-Stadion; Offenbach am Main	Chile	10–32	Friendly	Report

=== Matches against other teams ===
This list is incomplete.

Date	Location	Opposition	Result	Tournament
8 September 1956	London	Harlequin F.C.	8–26	Friendly
19 March 2000	**Hannover**	British Army	**26–9**	Friendly
12 August 2000	**Hannover**	Barbarian F.C.	19–47	Friendly
27 April 2002	**Heidelberg**	Canada Under 23	14–20	Friendly
1 April 2006	**Brandenburg**	Welsh Districts XV	**36–16**	Friendly
24 February 2007	Pontypridd	Welsh Districts XV	**24–13**	Friendly
8 November 2008	**Berlin**	Welsh Districts XV	14–27	Friendly
5 March 2011	**Frankfurt**	New Zealand Ambassadors	19–43	Friendly
5 November 2011	**Frankfurt**	New Zealand Ambassadors	**19–17**	Friendly
13 October 2012	**Frankfurt**	New Zealand Ambassadors	**22–20**	Friendly
23 February 2013	**Heidelberg**	Welsh Student XV	17–35	Friendly
5 October 2013	**Frankfurt**	New Zealand Ambassadors	**20–3**	Friendly
11 October 2014	**Pforzheim**	New Zealand Ambassadors	**21–19**	Friendly
24 January 2015	Galway	Connacht Eagles	7–50	Friendly
3 October 2015	**Heidelberg**	La Rochelle	10–66	Friendly

- German wins in **bold**.
- Locations of German home games in **bold**.

== Record of international matches ==
=== Germany 1927 to 1940 ===
German test matches prior to 1945
Country	First match	Overall	Won	Tie	Lost
France	1927	15	2	0	13
Spain	1929	2	2	0	0
Czechoslovakia	1931	2	2	0	0
Netherlands	1933	4	4	0	0
Italy	1936	6	4	0	2
Romania	1936	3	3	0	0
Belgium	1937	1	1	0	0
Overall record until 1940		33	18	0	15

=== Federal Republic of Germany ===
As of 20 March 2016:

1952 to present
Country	First match	Played	Won	Tie	Lost	% Won
Belgium	1952	27	19	1	7	70%
Italy	1952	14	0	1	13	0%
Spain	1952	20	6	2	12	30%
France	1954	27	0	1	26	0%
Czechoslovakia	1957	12	2	1	9	17%
Romania	1958	14	2	0	12	14%
Netherlands	1958	36	22	1	13	61%
Poland	1958	17	8	0	9	47%
Yugoslavia	1974	6	5	1	0	83%
Portugal	1974	10	4	0	6	40%
Morocco	1975	10	3	0	7	30%
Sweden	1977	9	6	0	3	67%
Soviet Union	1977	5	1	0	4	20%
Switzerland	1978	5	5	0	0	100%
Tunisia	1981	4	2	0	2	50%
Denmark	1985	9	8	0	1	89%
Western Samoa	1989	1	0	0	1	0%
Bulgaria	1990	1	1	0	0	100%
Namibia	1990	3	0	0	3	0%
Russia	1992	9	0	0	9	0%
Latvia	1993	2	2	0	0	100%
Lithuania	1993	1	1	0	0	100%
Czech Republic	1994	9	7	0	2	78%
Georgia	1995	6	0	0	6	0%
Andorra	1997	1	1	0	0	100%
Luxembourg	1998	2	2	0	0	100%
Ukraine	2000	8	4	1	3	50%
Croatia	2000	3	1	1	1	33%
Moldova	2004	7	4	0	3	57%
Austria	2005	1	1	0	0	100%
Malta	2005	1	1	0	0	100%
Serbia and Montenegro	2005	1	1	0	0	100%
Hong Kong	2009	2	2	0	0	100%
Brazil	2015	5	5	0	0	100%
Uruguay	2016	1	1	0	0	100%
Kenya	2017	1	1	0	0	100%
United States	2017	1	0	0	1	0%
Chile	2017	1	0	0	1	0%
Overall record 1952–2016		280	121	10	149	43%

Unofficial matches against British forces in Germany 1952 to 1999
Selection	Years	Overall	Won	Tie	Lost
British Army of the Rhine	1952–1983	33	12	4	17
Royal Air Force Germany	1955–1982	26	14	4	8
British Forces Germany	1995–1999	5	3	0	2
Overall Record 1952–1999		64	29	8	27

== See also ==
- List of German Democratic Republic national rugby union team results
