= Rugby Europe International Championships =

Rugby union European championship

- Current season, competition or edition: 2026–27 Rugby Europe International Championships
- Sport: Rugby union
- Founded: 1936; 90 years ago (predecessors); 2000; 26 years ago (current format)
- No. of teams: 35 (See below)
- Continent: Europe
- Most recent champion: Portugal
- Most titles: France (25); Georgia (17); Romania (10)

The Rugby Europe International Championships is the European Championship for rugby union

The tournament is the latest formation of a competition with history going back to 1932. At that time, France had been expelled from the then Five Nations, and joined with a number of European teams to found an alternative organisation, the International Amateur Rugby Federation (FIRA, now Rugby Europe). While France were eventually readmitted to the Five Nations, the then FIRA-AER continued to run competitions, increasingly taking the role of organiser of European continental rugby below the Five Nations, and in which France continued to compete.

The competition expanded and modified under the new Rugby Europe structure, even as France, then Italy, left to compete solely in the Six Nations. It was held in a variety of formats with a variety of names including the European Nations Cup and the Rugby Europe Nations Championship.

The competition today is split into 3 levels. The highest level is now called the Rugby Europe Championship and, unofficially, was referred to as the Six Nations B, although the event now features eight teams. Below the Championship a six team Rugby Europe Trophy is contested by tier three nations, with promotion and relegation operating between the Championship and the Trophy. Below that, as of 2024, is the Rugby Europe Conference consisting of the lowest ranked teams in Europe in five pools - previously there had been tiers within the conference. A previous Development Tier competition was disbanded at the same time.

== History ==
=== International championships before 2000 ===
Following the exclusion of France from the Five Nations Tournament after the 1931 edition, France joined with Italy, Romania, Germany, Spain, Belgium, Portugal, Netherlands, and Catalonia to create the International Amateur Rugby Federation (FIRA, now Rugby Europe) as an alternative to the International Rugby Football Board (now World Rugby). Three tournaments were held from 1936 to 1938, with France winning all three. Following the Second World War, France was readmitted into the Five Nations Championship, but they also competed in the only two tournaments organised by FIRA, the Rugby Union European Cup, held in 1952 and 1954, winning them both.

From 1965, FIRA attempted to revitalise the European competition by creating the FIRA Nations Cup (1965–1973) and then the FIRA Trophy (1973–1997); however, France fielded a France A side made up mostly of university students. While the French students won many of the tournaments, Romania also had their share of tournament titles. In the late 1990s, the championship became irregular, with some editions not taking place because of qualifications for the World Cup. Finally, the European Nations Cup began in 2000, no longer including France and Italy, as they now played in the reformed Six Nations Championship.

=== European Nations Cup: initial format (since 2000) ===
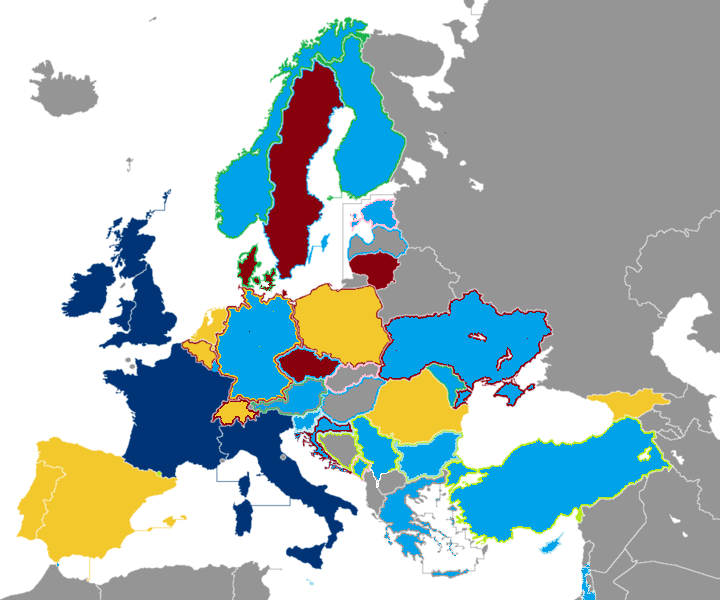
2024–25 Rugby Europe International Championships Key: Six Nations; Championship; Trophy; Conference; Others

After the setup of the divisional system in 2000, Romania won the first competition with maximum points, The initial season also included Morocco.

Russia then replaced Morocco in 2001 when Georgia secured the title and were crowned champions after a 31–20 win over Romania in Bucharest. As the competition format changed from a one-year tournament to two-years, the Netherlands were not relegated after this season.

Romania started 2002 trailing Georgia after the 2001 results, but managed to win all of the remaining five games, including a 31–23 victory in Tbilisi.

Portugal were 16–15 winners over Romania in Lisbon and installed themselves at the top of the 2003–04 table. In the second half of the competition, Romania won 36–6 against Portugal in Constanța, but went down 24–33 to Russia in Krasnodar. Then Portugal clinched their first title with a last-minute 19–18 home win over Russia. The Russia – Czech Republic game was rescheduled due to bad weather and was eventually cancelled.

The 2005–06 championships also served as a qualifying pool for the 2007 Rugby World Cup. Romania triumphed finishing level on points with Georgia, while Ukraine were relegated after losing all matches.

The 2007–08 edition saw the return of the Spanish to the top division. The winners were Georgia, following their display at the 2007 Rugby World Cup. The Russians recorded their best ever placement, finishing in second. The Czech Republic were the team to finish on the bottom of the table, losing all of their matches, relegating them back to Division 2A.

A new format was decided at the beginning of 2009. Each calendar year had its own champion, but the cumulated ranking over two years determined which team was relegated. The 2009–10 edition was also basis for European qualification to the 2011 Rugby World Cup. The 2009 season saw the début of Germany in the top division, Georgia defended their title, and there were wins for Portugal and Russia in Bucharest.

Faced with the possibility of missing a Rugby World Cup for the first time, Romania were managed the 2010 title. This feat was however not enough to overtake Georgia and Russia, who helped by their good results from the previous year, gained the automatic qualification for the 2011 RWC, leaving Romania to go through the Play-Off Qualification Rounds. Germany were relegated after failing to win any games.

Georgia won the 2011 edition, after beating Romania 18–11 in Tbilisi. The promoted team, Ukraine, lost all but one of their matches, single win over Portugal.

=== European Nations Cup: second format (from 2010 to 2016) ===
For the 2010–2012 competition (and promotion and relegation between groups going forward to successive competitions), the top two divisions (previously 1 and 2A) were redefined as 1A and 1B, both having six teams (previously six and five). The next four levels (previously 2B, 3A, 3B and 3C) become 2A-2D, under the new system, with the remnants of Division 3D making up the initial group of teams labelled as Division 3. In principle, each division is to encompass a different type of competition.

In Division 1, groups have six teams (meaning more matches and thus more travel), a significant fraction of the players are assumed to be professional or semi-professional (meaning that fixtures are, as often as possible, scheduled within the IRB's international fixtures time windows when clubs must release players for national duty), and only one team is promoted and one relegated every two years (meaning that the competitions are more stable).

In Division 2, groups have only five teams each (usually meaning one home match and one away match in the Autumn, and the same in the Spring, for each team), it is assumed that the majority of players are amateurs (meaning scheduling is not as limited), and in addition to the traditional automatic first-promoted-last-relegated system, fourth place from the higher pool will play second place from the lower pool after every two-year competition, with the winner taking the position in the higher pool. From a five-team group, one team is promoted, one team is relegated and two teams play in playoffs. Thus, a maximum of four of a pool's five teams could change from one two-year competition to the next.

In Division 3, a single-location, short-time-period (one week or 10 days) tournament is organised once per year. This minimises travel costs for teams and time-off-work requirements for players, and allows the flexibility of having a different membership every year, rather than requiring the membership to be constant over two years. The best performing team over two years of tournaments is promoted to Division 2.

In the year of transition to the new system (2010), there were no relegations from any division below the highest, because the second-highest (old 2A, new 1B) was expanded by one team.

=== International Championships: third format (from 2016 to 2022) ===
From September 2016, the European Nations Cup became the Rugby Europe International Championships, made up of five levels or divisions:

- Level 1 - Championship. The top six ranked European teams outside the Six Nations contest the annual title. Replaces the former Division 1A.
- Level 2 - Trophy. The next six ranked European teams bid for the Trophy title. Replaces the former Division 1B.
- Level 3 - Conference 1. Division 2, A through to D, becomes the new Conference level, where twenty teams are separated into two Conferences made up of ten teams each, based on their previous year rankings. Each conference is then split into two, North and South, where teams could change each year depending on the competing teams - nations closest to boundary moved from North to South and vice versa each season as necessary to geographically balance the conferences.
- Level 4 - Conference 2
- Level 5 - Development. Replaces Division 3.

The Trophy, Conference and Development divisions have normally been held across the turn of the year, in the autumn and winter of one year and the spring of the next. The Championship has usually been held in the spring, concurrent with the second half of the lower three divisions (and also concurrent with the Six Nations Championship).

A promotion and relegation play-off system is maintained across all levels every year, moving away from the two-year system in place since 2003, meaning teams will be promoted and relegated every year.

In the 2020–2021 season, due to the worldwide COVID-19 epidemic, the lower divisions were not held, and much of the 2021 Championship division was delayed, being held over the whole of 2021 (thus, its last matches overlapped with the following 2021–2022 season of the lower divisions). Thus, there was no promotion/relegation between the divisions, including between the Championship and Trophy, following the 2020–2021 season: promotion/relegation resumed following the 2022 Championship (which was held on-time) and the 2021-2022 Trophy, Conference and Development divisions. The structure was slightly changed after 2022, to increase the Championship division to eight rather than six teams: furthermore, Russia (who had played, and lost, their first two matches), were disqualified and banned from the 2022 Championship and from all international rugby until further notice, following the Russian invasion of Ukraine after having played two matches of the 2022 season: their three remaining matches in the 2022 Championship were awarded to their opponents (Portugal, Georgia and Netherlands), by walkover.

Qualification for three European spots in the 2023 Rugby World Cup was determined by the collective results of the 2021 and 2022 Championships added together, which (thanks to the fact of no promotion and relegation following the 2021 season, and the lower divisions not being played at all) formed a full home-and-away round-robin between the six nations of the Championship. The top two teams would qualify as Europe 1 and Europe 2: the third-place team, as Europe 3, would enter the final qualification tournament along with Africa 3 (Kenya), Americas 3 (USA) and the loser of the Asia/Pacific play-off (Hong Kong). Russia's expulsion mattered little, since they had lost all but two of their matches anyway (both in the 2021 season). However, the issue of ineligible players raised its head again, though not to the extent it had in the 2019 qualification: Spain, who had been fourth in 2021 but second in 2022 and were in fact in second place over the collective two years, were penalised 10 points - five in each season - for fielding an ineligible player in two matches. Georgia were far ahead in first place, with 9 wins and 1 draw over the two years: Spain's discomfiture resulted in Romania qualifying directly from the Championship in second place, and Portugal being in third place for the final intercontinental qualifier. Portugal won that tournament to qualify for the World Cup.

Additionally, Rugby Europe made changes to the bonus points system. The standard system, that is applied in the Six Nations Championship was discarded in favour of the French system. The main difference is that where previously a team would be awarded 1 try bonus point for scoring (at least) 4 tries, regardless of the outcome, and whereas now, a team would be awarded 1 "bonus" point for winning while scoring at least the equivalent of 3 or more tries than their opponent.

=== International Championships: fourth format (from 2022 to 2023) ===
From October 2022, the Rugby Europe International Championships, made up of five levels or divisions:

- Level 1 - Championship. The top eight ranked European teams outside the Six Nations contest the annual title.
- Level 2 - Trophy. The next six (originally intended, ended up as five) ranked European teams bid for the Trophy title.
- Level 3 - Conference 1
- Level 4 - Conference 2
- Level 5 - Development

A statement was released by the Polish Rugby Union in December 2021 confirming that the Rugby Europe Championship, will expand to 8 teams in 2022/2023 season. To accommodate this expansion, no team will be relegated from the top tier, while two teams from the second tier Trophy Championship will be promoted following the completion of the 2021/2022 Championship. The serpentine system is applied to allocate each team to their respective groups. Each team will play a total of five games (three round robin group matches to determine the team's path and two play-off matches). Seeding (for group) and relegation is calculated over a two-year cycle, as is the promotion from Trophy competition.

This was further altered by Russia's expulsion from international sport following the invasion of Ukraine, which left only five teams from those who had contested the 2022 Championship. Three teams, rather than the originally intended two, were promoted from the Trophy - Belgium, Germany and Poland: and the Trophy, in 2022–23, thus contained only five teams rather than the previous six, even with the promotion of Sweden and Croatia from the Conference to join Ukraine, Lithuania and Croatia.

A relegation system is maintained two-year for Championship/Trophy and one-year for Trophy/Conference, moving away from the one-year system in place since 2016, meaning teams will be promoted and relegated every two year.

=== International Championships: fifth format (from 2023 to 2024) ===
From 2023, the Rugby Europe International Championships, made up of four levels or divisions:

- Level 1 - Championship. The top eight ranked European teams outside the Six Nations contest the annual title. For the 2024 Championship, these were the same eight teams as in 2023.
- Level 2 - Trophy. The next six ranked European teams bid for the Trophy title. (The five teams from the 2022–23 season were joined by the previous year's Conference champions, the Czech Republic.)
- Level 3 - Conference. Former Conference 1 and Conference 2 combined to one level, in four groups.
- Level 4 - Development

A statement was released by the Polish Rugby Union in June 2023, confirming that the Rugby Europe Conference 1 and Conference 2 will be combined to one level. Teams with ambitions of climbing up the rugby pyramid can compete in a play-off to the Trophy after submitting their intentions to Rugby Europe where an assessment on various aspects will be made after winning their respective pool.

=== International Championships: new format (2024 to 2026) ===
From 2024, the Rugby Europe International Championships, made up of three levels or divisions:

- Level 1 - Championship. The top eight ranked European teams outside the Six Nations contest the annual title.
- Level 2 - Trophy. The next six ranked European teams bid for the Trophy title.
- Level 3 - Conference. Former Conference and Development combined to one level, in five groups.

=== International Championships: new format (from 2026) ===
From 2024, the Rugby Europe International Championships, made up of three levels or divisions:

- Level 1 - Championship. The top eight ranked European teams outside the Six Nations contest the annual title.
- Level 2 - Trophy. The next six ranked European teams bid for the Trophy title.
- Level 3 - Conference. Former Conference and Development combined to one level, in five groups.

A relegation system is maintained across all levels one-year, moving away from the two-year system for Championship-Trophy in place since 2022. Championship/Trophy direct promotion/relegation was replaced by a promotion/relegation play-off.

== Current divisions and standings (2026–27) ==
Key
| * | Champion of the 2025–26 season |
| ↑ | Team promoted from the division below after the 2025–26 season |
| • | Division champion but team not promoted after the 2025–26 season |
| ‡ | Last place of division but team not relegated after the 2025–26 season |
| ↓ | Team relegated from the division above after the 2025–26 season |

=== Championship & Trophy ===
Championship teams
Pool A
Belgium
Georgia
Poland ↑
Romania
Pool B
Netherlands
Spain
Portugal *
Switzerland

| Trophy | Pl | W | Pts |
|---|---|---|---|
| Czech Republic | 3 | 3 | 14 |
| Malta ↑ | 3 | 3 | 12 |
| Germany ↓ | 3 | 2 | 11 |
| Sweden | 3 | 1 | 7 |
| Denmark | 3 | 0 | 0 |
| Lithuania | 3 | 0 | 0 |

=== Conference ===
| Pool A | Pl | W | Pts |
|---|---|---|---|
| Luxembourg • | 2 | 2 | 10 |
| Finland | 1 | 1 | 5 |
| Norway | 1 | 0 | 0 |
| Estonia | 2 | 0 | 0 |

| Pool B | Pl | W | Pts |
|---|---|---|---|
| Croatia ↓ | 3 | 3 | 14 |
| Austria • | 2 | 1 | 6 |
| Serbia | 2 | 0 | 0 |
| Slovenia | 1 | 0 | 0 |

| Pool C | Pl | W | Pts |
|---|---|---|---|
| Ukraine • | 1 | 1 | 5 |
| Bulgaria | 1 | 0 | 2 |
| Turkey | 2 | 0 | 2 |
| Moldova | 0 | 0 | 0 |

| Pool D | Pl | W | Pts |
|---|---|---|---|
| Cyprus | 1 | 1 | 5 |
| Israel | 1 | 1 | 4 |
| Andorra | 1 | 0 | 0 |
| Gibraltar | 1 | 0 | 0 |

| Pool E | Pl | W | Pts |
|---|---|---|---|
| Greece | 1 | 1 | 5 |
| Montenegro | 1 | 1 | 4 |
| Kosovo | 2 | 0 | 0 |

Updated through 14 November 2026

== Predecessor tournaments (1936–1999) ==
=== FIRA Tournaments (1936–1938) ===
| Year | Host city | Winner | Runner-up | Third place |
|---|---|---|---|---|
| 1936 | (Nazi Germany) Berlin | France | Germany | Italy |
| 1937 | (French Fourth Republic) Paris | France | Italy | Germany |
| 1938 | (Romania) Bucharest | France | Germany | Romania |

=== Rugby Union European Cup (1952–1954) ===
| Year | Winner | Runner-up | Third place |
|---|---|---|---|
| 1952 | France | Italy | West Germany |
| 1954 | France | Italy | Spain |

=== FIRA Nations Cup (1965–1973) ===
| Year | First Division | | | | Second Division |
| Year | Winner | Runner-up | Third | Relegated | Winner |
|---|---|---|---|---|---|
| 1965–66 | France | Italy | Romania | Czechoslovakia | Portugal |
| 1966–67 | France | Romania | Italy | Portugal | Czechoslovakia |
| 1967–68 | France | Romania | Czechoslovakia | — | Poland |
| 1968–69 | Romania | France | Czechoslovakia | West Germany; Poland | Italy |
| 1969–70 | France | Romania | Italy | Czechoslovakia | Morocco |
| 1970–71 | France | Romania | Morocco | Italy | Czechoslovakia |
| 1971–72 | France | Romania | Morocco | Czechoslovakia | Spain |
| 1972–73 | France | Romania | Spain | — | Portugal |

=== FIRA Trophy (1973–1997) ===
| Year | First Division | | | | Lower Division Champions | |
| Year | Winner | Runner-up | Third | Relegated | Second Division | Third Division |
|---|---|---|---|---|---|---|
| 1973–74 | France | Romania | Spain | Poland; Morocco | Italy | Not held |
| 1974–75 | Romania | France | Italy | Czechoslovakia | Poland | Not held |
| 1975–76 | France | Italy | Romania | Netherlands | Morocco (Note: Promoted to First division); Czechoslovakia | Not held |
| 1976–77 | Romania | France | Italy | Morocco | Czechoslovakia | Belgium |
| 1977–78 | France | Romania | Spain | Czechoslovakia | Soviet Union | Not held |
| 1978–79 | France | Romania | Soviet Union | Spain | Morocco | Not held |
| 1979–80 | France | Romania | Italy | Morocco | Spain | Tunisia |
| 1980–81 | Romania | France | Soviet Union | Poland | West Germany | Portugal |
| 1981–82 | France | Italy | Romania | — | Morocco | Sweden |
| 1982–83 | Romania | Italy | Soviet Union | West Germany | Poland | Czechoslovakia |
| 1983–84 | France | Romania | Italy | Poland; Morocco | Spain; Tunisia | Not held |
| 1984–85 | France | Soviet Union | Italy | Spain | Portugal | Netherlands |
| 1985–87 | France | Soviet Union | Romania | Tunisia; Portugal | Spain | Not held |
| 1987–89 | France | Soviet Union | Romania | Spain | Poland | Bulgaria |
| 1989–90 | France A (Note: Champions of First division) | Soviet Union | Romania | Poland | Spain | Andorra |
| 1990–92 | France A | Italy | Romania | — | Germany; Morocco | Sweden |
| 1992–94 | France A | Italy | Romania | — | Poland; Croatia | Georgia; Moldova |
| 1995–97 | Italy | France | Romania | — | Netherlands; Serbia and Montenegro | Ukraine; Hungary; Austria |

=== FIRA Tournament (1996–1999) ===
| Year | First Division | | | | Lower Division Champions | | |
| Year | Winner | Runner-up | Third | Relegated | Second Division | Third Division | Fourth Division |
|---|---|---|---|---|---|---|---|
| 1996–97 | Spain | Portugal | Poland | — | Not held | | |
| 1997–98 | Not held | | | | Latvia | Luxembourg | Austria |
| 1998–99 | Not held | | | | Russia | Germany; Croatia; Denmark | Switzerland |

=== Statistics ===
| Nation | 1st place, gold medalist(s) | 2nd place, silver medalist(s) | 3rd place, bronze medalist(s) |
|---|---|---|---|
| France | 25 | 5 | - |
| Romania | 6 | 12 | 7 |
| Italy | 1 | 9 | 8 |
| Soviet Union | 1 | 3 | 3 |
| Spain | 1 | - | 3 |
| Germany | - | 1 | 3 |
| Morocco | - | - | 2 |
| Czechoslovakia | - | - | 2 |

== Current tournaments (2000–present) ==
=== European Nations Cup (2000–2016) ===
| Year | First Division | | | | Lower Division Champions | | |
| Year | Winner | Runner-up | Third | Relegated | Second Division | Third Division | Fourth Division |
|---|---|---|---|---|---|---|---|
| 2000 | Romania | Georgia | Morocco | — | Russia | Czech Republic | Slovenia |
| 2001 | Georgia | Romania | Russia | — | Poland | Not held | Not held |
| 2001–02 | Romania | Georgia | Russia | Netherlands | Not held | Slovenia | Not held |
| 2003–04 | Portugal | Romania | Georgia | Spain | Ukraine | Moldova | Not held |
| 2004–06 | Romania | Georgia | Portugal | Ukraine | Spain | Latvia | Not held |
| 2006–08 | Georgia | Russia | Romania | Czech Republic | Germany | Sweden | Not held |
| 2008–10 | Georgia | Russia | Portugal | Germany | Ukraine | Lithuania | Not held |
| 2010 | Romania | Georgia | Russia | Germany | Ukraine | Lithuania | Not held |
| 2011 | Georgia | Romania | Portugal | Ukraine | Belgium | Sweden | Not held |
| 2012 | Georgia | Spain | Romania | Ukraine | Belgium | Sweden | Not held |
| 2013 | Georgia | Romania | Russia | Belgium | Germany | Netherlands | Not held |
| 2014 | Georgia | Romania | Russia | Belgium | Germany | Netherlands | Not held |
| 2015 | Georgia | Romania | Spain | Portugal | Belgium | Estonia | Not held |
| 2016 | Georgia | Romania | Russia | Portugal | Belgium | Estonia | Not held |

=== Rugby Europe International Championships (2016–) ===
==== First format ====
| Year | Championship | | | | Trophy | | | | Conference 1 | | | | Conference 2 | | | Development |
| Year | Winner | Runner-up | Third | Relegated | Winner | Runner-up | Third | Relegated | Winners | | Relegated | | Winners | | Relegated | Winner |
|---|---|---|---|---|---|---|---|---|---|---|---|---|---|---|---|---|
| 2016–17 | Romania | Georgia | Spain | — | Portugal | Netherlands | Switzerland | Ukraine | Czech Republic (Note: Promoted to Trophy) | Malta | Luxembourg | Cyprus | Hungary (Note: Promoted to Conference 1) | Bosnia and Herzegovina | Turkey | Slovakia (Note: Promoted to Conference 2) |
| 2017–18 | Georgia | Russia | Germany | — | Portugal | Netherlands | Czech Republic | Moldova | Lithuania | Malta | Latvia | Andorra | Luxembourg | Cyprus | Estonia | Bulgaria |
| 2018–19 | Georgia | Spain | Romania | Germany | Portugal (Note: Promoted to Championship) | Netherlands | Switzerland | Czech Republic | Ukraine | Malta | Moldova | Bosnia and Herzegovina | Latvia | Slovenia | Slovakia | Turkey |
| 2019–20 | Georgia | Spain | Romania | Belgium | Netherlands | Switzerland | Ukraine | — | — | — | — | — | — | — | — | — |
| 2020–21 | Georgia | Romania | Portugal | — | Not held | | | | | | | | | | | |
| 2021–22 | Georgia | Romania | Spain | Russia (Note: Disqualified and suspended due to the Russian invasion of Ukraine) | Belgium | Poland | Germany | — | Sweden | Croatia | — | — | Moldova | Bulgaria | — | Slovakia |

==== Second format ====
| Year | Championship | | | | Trophy | | Conference 1 | | | | Conference 2 | | | Development |
| Year | Winner | Runner-up | Third | Relegated | Winner | Relegated | Winners | | Relegated | | Winners | | Relegated | Winner |
|---|---|---|---|---|---|---|---|---|---|---|---|---|---|---|
| 2022–23 | Georgia | Portugal | Romania | — | Switzerland | — | Czech Republic (Note: Promoted to Trophy) | Israel | — | — | Finland | Serbia | Montenegro (Note: Withdrawn) | Austria (Note: Promoted to Conference) |

==== Third format ====
| Year | Championship | | | | Trophy | | Conference | | | | | Development | |
| Year | Winner | Runner-up | Third | Relegated | Winner | Relegated | Winners | | | | Relegated | Winner | Runner-up |
|---|---|---|---|---|---|---|---|---|---|---|---|---|---|
| 2023–24 | Georgia | Portugal | Spain | Poland | Switzerland (Note: Promoted to Championship) | Ukraine | Latvia | Luxembourg (Note: Promoted to Trophy) | Moldova | Malta | — | Montenegro (Note: Promoted to Conference) | Kosovo |

==== Fourth format ====
| Year | Championship | | | | Trophy | | Conference | | | | |
| Year | Winner | Runner-up | Third | Relegated | Winner | Relegated | Winners | | | | |
|---|---|---|---|---|---|---|---|---|---|---|---|
| 2024–25 | Georgia | Spain | Romania | Germany | Poland (Note: Promoted to Championship due two year based ranking) | Luxembourg | Denmark (Note: Promoted to Trophy) | Ukraine | Moldova | Malta | Slovenia |
| 2025–26 | Portugal | Georgia | Spain | Germany | Czech Republic | Croatia | Luxembourg | Austria | Ukraine | Malta | Bosnia and Herzegovina |
| 2026–27 | | | | | | | | Croatia | | | |

== Statistics (2000–present) ==
=== All-time table ===
| Nation | Pld | W | D | L | PF | PA | PD | AVPPG | Pts | Win% | Champs |
|---|---|---|---|---|---|---|---|---|---|---|---|
| Georgia | 135 | 116 | 5 | 14 | 4531 | 1561 | +2970 | 33.6 | 500 | 85.93% | 17 |
| Romania | 135 | 89 | 2 | 44 | 3443 | 2154 | +1289 | 25.5 | 365 | 65.93% | 5 |
| Spain | 125 | 52 | 4 | 68 | 2865 | 2918 | −53 | 22.9 | 252 | 41.6% | 0 |
| Portugal | 120 | 56 | 4 | 60 | 2736 | 2550 | +186 | 22.8 | 259 | 46.67% | 2 |
| Russia | 108 | 54 | 3 | 51 | 2526 | 2233 | +293 | 23.4 | 232 | 50% | 0 |
| Germany | 55 | 7 | 1 | 47 | 699 | 2374 | −1675 | 12.7 | 41 | 12.73% | 0 |
| Belgium | 50 | 15 | 1 | 34 | 916 | 1412 | −496 | 18.3 | 78 | 30% | 0 |
| Netherlands | 45 | 10 | 0 | 35 | 803 | 1499 | −696 | 17.8 | 66 | 22.22% | 0 |
| Czech Republic | 29 | 6 | 0 | 23 | 362 | 1075 | −713 | 12.48 | 40 | 20.69% | 0 |
| Ukraine | 20 | 1 | 0 | 19 | 201 | 997 | −796 | 10.05 | 15 | 5% | 0 |
| Poland | 10 | 1 | 0 | 9 | 126 | 381 | -255 | 12.6 | 6 | 10% | 0 |
| Switzerland | 10 | 3 | 0 | 7 | 135 | 475 | -340 | 13.5 | 12 | 30% | 0 |
| Morocco | 5 | 3 | 0 | 2 | 94 | 69 | +25 | 18.80 | 11 | 60% | 0 |

=== Performance by team ===
| Nation | Winner | Runner-up | Third Place |
|---|---|---|---|
| Georgia | 17 | 6 | 1 |
| Romania | 5 | 9 | 7 |
| Portugal | 2 | 2 | 4 |
| Spain | 0 | 4 | 5 |
| Russia | 0 | 3 | 6 |
| Germany | 0 | 0 | 1 |
| Morocco | 0 | 0 | 1 |

=== Records (since 2000) ===
Updated as of 15 March 2026
Division 1A

Titles

- Most titles: 17 – Georgia (2001, 2007–2008, 2008–2009, 2011, 2012, 2013, 2014, 2015, 2016, 2018, 2019, 2020, 2021, 2022, 2023, 2024, 2025)
- Most consecutive titles: 8 – Georgia (2018, 2019, 2020, 2021, 2022, 2023, 2024, 2025)

Top division appearances

- 29 (joint record) – Georgia (2000–present), Romania (2000–present)

Wins

- most wins overall: 115 – Georgia
- most home wins overall: 59 – Georgia
- most away wins overall: 54 – Georgia
- most consecutive wins overall: 22 – Georgia (12 February 2022 – 8 March 2026)
- most consecutive home wins: 31 – Georgia (14 March 2009 – 26 June 2021)
- most consecutive away wins: 18 – Georgia (17 February 2018 – 8 March 2026)

Draws

- most draws overall: 5 – Georgia

Losses

- most losses overall: 66 – Spain

Points

- most points scored in a season: 389 – Romania (10 games – 2005–2006) 303 Georgia (5 games – 2025)
- fewest points conceded in a season: 75 – Georgia (10 games – 2015–2016) 33 Georgia (5 games – 2016)
- most points conceded in a season: 556 – Ukraine (10 games – 2005–2006) 359 Germany (5 games – 2018)
- fewest points scored in a season: 58 – Germany (10 games – 2008–2009) 34 Germany (5 games – 2018)
- most points scored in a match: 110 – (Georgia 110–0 Switzerland 1 February 2025)
- most points scored in a match by one team 110 – Georgia – (Georgia 110–0 Switzerland 1 February 2025)
- biggest winning margin: 110 – Georgia – (Georgia 110–0 Switzerland 1 February 2025)
- most points scored by losing team: 38 (joint record) – Spain, Romania; matches (Spain 38–40 Czech Republic, 30 March 2003, Germany 41–38 Romania, 11 February 2017)
- biggest draw: 25–25 (Georgia v Portugal 6 February 2022)
- fewest points scored in a match: 12 (joint record) – Portugal 9–3 Morocco 19 March 2000, Spain 6–6 Georgia, 22 February 2004, Georgia 9–3 Russia, 6 March 2004
- fewest points scored by winning team: 8 (Romania 8–7 Georgia, 19 March 2017)

Games without a loss

- Longest unbeaten run: 44 – Georgia (10 February 2018 – 8 March 2026)
- Most consecutive games without a loss home: 58 – Georgia (6 March 2004 – present)
- Most consecutive games without a loss away: 18 – Georgia (17 February 2018 – 8 March 2026)

Games without a win

- 17, joint record – Ukraine (20 November 2004 – 17 March 2012), Germany (15 November 2009 – 27 February 2016)

=== Other trophies ===
Several other trophies are contested within the main competition, mostly as long-standing fixtures between pairs of teams.

- Trophy of the Two Iberias: Georgia versus Spain. The most recent Trophy of the Two Iberias match was won by Georgia (2026)
- Coltan Cup: Portugal versus Belgium. The most recent Coltan Cup match was won by Portugal (2026)
- Suebi Bowl: Germany versus Portugal. The most recent Suebi Bowl match was won by Portugal (2026)
- Antim Cup: Romania versus Georgia. The most recent Antim Cup match was won by Georgia (2026)
- Viriato Cup: Portugal versus Spain. The most recent Viriato Cup match was won by Portugal (2026)
- Trajan's Column: Spain versus Romania. The most recent Trajan's Column match was won by Spain (2026)
- Kiseleff Cup: Romania versus Russia. The most recent Kiseleff Cup match was won by Romania (2022)
- Moscow Gold: Russia versus Spain. The most recent Moscow Gold match was won by Spain (2022)

== See also ==
- Rugby World Cup
- History of rugby union matches between Georgia and Romania
- Six Nations Championship
- Rugby Europe (formerly FIRA–AER)
- Sevens Grand Prix Series
