= History of rugby union matches between France and Italy =

France and Italy have played each other at rugby union a total of 52 matches, with France winning 48 times, Italy winning 3 times, and one match drawn. Since 2007, the winner of the meeting between the teams in the Six Nations Tournament has received the Giuseppe Garibaldi Trophy.

== Summary ==
Note: Summary below reflects test results by both teams.

| Details | Played | Won by France | Won by Italy | Drawn | France points | Italy points |
|---|---|---|---|---|---|---|
| In France | 28 | 26 | 1 | 1 | 909 | 335 |
| In Italy | 22 | 20 | 2 | 0 | 683 | 246 |
| Neutral venue | 2 | 2 | 0 | 0 | 66 | 32 |
| Overall | 52 | 48 | 3 | 1 | 1,658 | 613 |

=== Records ===
Note: Date shown in brackets indicates when the record was or last set.

| Record | France | Italy |
|---|---|---|
| Longest winning streak | 18 (17 October 1937 – 22 March 1997) | 1 (3 February 2013) |
Largest points for
| Home | 60 (26 March 1967; 6 October 2023) | 27 (23 March 2003) |
| Away | 73 (23 February 2025) | 40 (22 March 1997) |
Largest winning margin
| Home | 53 (6 October 2023) | 5 (3 February 2013) |
| Away | 49 (23 February 2025) | 8 (22 March 1997) |

== Results ==
| No. | Date | Venue | Score | Winner | Competition |
|---|---|---|---|---|---|
| 1 | 17 October 1937 | Parc des Princes, Paris | 43–5 | France | 1937 FIRA Tournament |
| 2 | 17 May 1952 | Arena Civica, Milan | 8–17 | France | Europe Cup 1952 |
| 3 | 26 April 1953 | Stade de Gerland, Lyon | 22–8 | France | 1952 Italy tour of Europe |
| 4 | 24 April 1954 | Stadio Olimpico, Rome | 12–39 | France | Europe Cup 1954 |
| 5 | 10 April 1955 | Stade Lesdiguières, Grenoble | 24–0 | France | 1955 Italy tour of France |
| 6 | 2 April 1956 | Stadio Plebiscito, Padua | 3–16 | France | 1956 France tour of Italy |
| 7 | 21 April 1957 | Stade Armandie, Agen | 38–6 | France | 1957 Italy tour of France |
| 8 | 7 April 1958 | Stadio Arturo Collana, Naples | 3–11 | France | 1958 France tour of Italy |
| 9 | 29 March 1959 | Stade Marcel Saupin, Nantes | 22–0 | France | 1959 Italy tour of France |
| 10 | 17 April 1960 | Stadio Comunale di Monigo, Treviso | 0–26 | France | 1960 France tour of Italy |
| 11 | 2 April 1961 | Stade Municipal, Chambéry | 17–0 | France | 1961 Italy tour of France |
| 12 | 22 April 1962 | Stadio Mompiano, Brescia | 3–6 | France | 1962 France tour of Italy |
| 13 | 14 April 1963 | Stade Lesdiguières, Grenoble | 14–12 | France | 1963 Italy tour of France |
| 14 | 29 March 1964 | Stadio XXV Aprile, Parma | 3–12 | France | 1964 France tour of Italy |
| 15 | 18 April 1965 | Gare de La Croix du Prince, Pau | 21–0 | France | 1965 Italy tour of France |
| 16 | 9 April 1966 | Stadio Arturo Collana, Naples | 0–21 | France | 1966–67 Nations Cup |
| 17 | 26 March 1967 | Stade Mayol, Toulon | 60–13 | France | 1967–68 Nations Cup |
| 18 | 17 February 1985 | Treviso | 22–9 | France | |
| 19 | 14 October 1995 | Estadio Ferro Carril Oeste, Buenos Aires (Argentina) | 34–22 | France | 1995 Latin Cup |
| 20 | 22 March 1997 | Stade Lesdiguières, Grenoble | 32–40 | Italy | 1995–97 FIRA Trophy |
| 21 | 18 October 1997 | Stade du Moulias, Auch | 30–19 | France | 1997 Latin Cup |
| 22 | 1 April 2000 | Stade de France, Saint-Denis | 42–31 | France | 2000 Six Nations Championship |
| 23 | 3 March 2001 | Stadio Flaminio, Rome | 19–30 | France | 2001 Six Nations Championship |
| 24 | 2 February 2002 | Stade de France, Saint-Denis | 33–12 | France | 2002 Six Nations Championship |
| 25 | 23 March 2003 | Stadio Flaminio, Rome | 27–53 | France | 2003 Six Nations Championship |
| 26 | 21 February 2004 | Stade de France, Saint-Denis | 25–0 | France | 2004 Six Nations Championship |
| 27 | 19 March 2005 | Stadio Flaminio, Rome | 13–56 | France | 2005 Six Nations Championship |
| 28 | 25 February 2006 | Stade de France, Saint-Denis | 37–12 | France | 2006 Six Nations Championship |
| 29 | 3 February 2007 | Stadio Flaminio, Rome | 3–39 | France | 2007 Six Nations Championship |
| 30 | 9 March 2008 | Stade de France, Saint-Denis | 25–13 | France | 2008 Six Nations Championship |
| 31 | 21 March 2009 | Stadio Flaminio, Rome | 8–50 | France | 2009 Six Nations Championship |
| 32 | 14 March 2010 | Stade de France, Saint-Denis | 46–20 | France | 2010 Six Nations Championship |
| 33 | 12 March 2011 | Stadio Flaminio, Rome | 22–21 | Italy | 2011 Six Nations Championship |
| 34 | 4 February 2012 | Stade de France, Saint-Denis | 30–12 | France | 2012 Six Nations Championship |
| 35 | 3 February 2013 | Stadio Olimpico, Rome | 23–18 | Italy | 2013 Six Nations Championship |
| 36 | 9 February 2014 | Stade de France, Saint-Denis | 30–10 | France | 2014 Six Nations Championship |
| 37 | 15 March 2015 | Stadio Olimpico, Rome | 0–29 | France | 2015 Six Nations Championship |
| 38 | 19 September 2015 | Twickenham Stadium, London (England) | 32–10 | France | 2015 Rugby World Cup |
| 39 | 6 February 2016 | Stade de France, Saint-Denis | 23–21 | France | 2016 Six Nations Championship |
| 40 | 11 March 2017 | Stadio Olimpico, Rome | 18–40 | France | 2017 Six Nations Championship |
| 41 | 23 February 2018 | Stade Vélodrome, Marseille | 34–17 | France | 2018 Six Nations Championship |
| 42 | 16 March 2019 | Stadio Olimpico, Rome | 14–25 | France | 2019 Six Nations Championship |
| 43 | 30 August 2019 | Stade de France, Saint-Denis | 47–19 | France | 2019 Rugby World Cup warm-up match |
| 44 | 9 February 2020 | Stade de France, Saint-Denis | 35–22 | France | 2020 Six Nations Championship |
| 45 | 28 November 2020 | Stade de France, Saint-Denis | 36–5 | France | Autumn Nations Cup |
| 46 | 6 February 2021 | Stadio Olimpico, Rome | 10–50 | France | 2021 Six Nations Championship |
| 47 | 7 February 2022 | Stade de France, Saint-Denis | 37–10 | France | 2022 Six Nations Championship |
| 48 | 5 February 2023 | Stadio Olimpico, Rome | 24–29 | France | 2023 Six Nations Championship |
| 49 | 6 October 2023 | Parc Olympique Lyonnais, Décines-Charpieu | 60–7 | France | 2023 Rugby World Cup |
| 50 | 25 February 2024 | Stade Pierre-Mauroy, Villeneuve-d'Ascq | 13–13 | draw | 2024 Six Nations Championship |
| 51 | 23 February 2025 | Stadio Olimpico, Rome | 24–73 | France | 2025 Six Nations Championship |
| 52 | 22 February 2026 | Stade de France, Saint-Denis | 33–8 | France | 2026 Six Nations Championship |

== XV Results ==
Below are a list of matches that Italy has awarded matches test match status by virtue of awarding caps, but France did not award caps.

| Date | Venue | Score | Winner | Competition |
|---|---|---|---|---|
| 22 April 1935 | Stadio Nazionale PNF, Rome | 6–44 | France XV | 1935 France XV tour of Italy |
| 28 March 1948 | Stadio Comunale Mario Battaglini, Rovigo | 6–39 | France XV | 1948 France XV tour of Italy |
| 27 March 1949 | Stade Vélodrome, Marseille | 27–0 | France XV | 1949 Italy tour of France |
| 21 July 1955 | Estadi Olímpic Lluís Companys, Barcelona (Spain) | 16–8 | France XV | 1955 Mediterranean Cup |
| 9 November 1969 | Stadio Santa Maria Goretti, Catania | 8–22 | France XV | 1969–70 FIRA Nations Cup |
| 28 February 1971 | Stade du Ray, Nice | 37–13 | France XV | 1970–71 FIRA Nations Cup |
| 15 February 1975 | Stadio Flaminio, Rome | 9–16 | France XV | 1974–75 FIRA Trophy |
| 7 February 1976 | Arena Civica, Milan | 11–23 | France XV | 1975–76 FIRA Trophy |
| 6 February 1977 | Stade Lesdiguières, Grenoble | 10–3 | France XV | 1976–77 FIRA Trophy |
| 4 February 1978 | Stadio Tommaso Fattori, L'Aquila | 9–31 | France XV | 1977–78 FIRA Trophy |
| 18 February 1979 | Stadio Plebiscito, Padua | 9–15 | France XV | 1978–79 FIRA Trophy |
| 22 September 1979 | Makarska RC, Makarska (Croatia, Yugoslavia) | 38–12 | France XV | 1979 Mediterranean Cup |
| 17 February 1980 | Stade Marcel-Michelin, Clermont-Ferrand | 46–9 | France XV | 1979–80 FIRA Trophy |
| 8 March 1981 | Stadio Comunale Mario Battaglini, Rovigo | 9–17 | France XV | 1980–81 FIRA Trophy |
| 21 February 1982 | Stade Albert Domec, Carcassonne | 25–19 | France XV | 1981–82 FIRA Trophy |
| 6 February 1983 | Stadio Comunale Mario Battaglini, Rovigo | 6–6 | draw | 1982–83 FIRA Trophy |
| 13 September 1983 | COC Stadium, Casablanca | 26–12 | France XV | 1983 Mediterranean Cup |
| 19 February 1984 | Stade Léo Lagrange, Chalon-sur-Saône | 38–16 | France XV | 1983–84 FIRA Trophy |
| 3 March 1985 | Stadio Comunale di Monigo, Treviso | 9–22 | France XV | 1984–85 FIRA Trophy |
| 15 February 1986 | Union Sportive Annecy Rugby, Annecy | 18–0 | France XV | 1985–87 FIRA Trophy |
| 22 February 1987 | Stadio Plebiscito, Padua | 6–22 | France XV | 1985–87 FIRA Trophy |
| 7 February 1988 | Stade Louis II, Fontvieille (Monaco) | 19–9 | France XV | 1987–89 FIRA Trophy |
| 19 February 1989 | Stadio Mompiano, Brescia | 12–40 | France XV | 1987–89 FIRA Trophy |
| 18 February 1990 | Stadium Municipal d'Albi, Albi | 22–12 | France XV | 1989–90 FIRA Trophy |
| 2 March 1991 | Stadio Flaminio, Rome | 9–15 | France XV | 1990–92 FIRA Trophy |
| 20 February 1993 | Stadio Comunale di Monigo, Treviso | 12–14 | France XV | 1993 France XV tour of Italy |
| 25 June 1993 | Stade Raoul-Barrière, Béziers | 31–6 | France XV | 1993 Mediterranean Cup |
| 11 November 1993 | Stadio Comunale di Monigo, Treviso | 16–9 | Italy | 1992–94 FIRA Trophy |
| 4 December 1994 | Stade Digione, Digione | 14–9 | France XV | 1994 Italy tour of France |
| 30 January 1999 | Stadio Luigi Ferraris, Genoa | 24–29 | France XV | 1999 France XV tour of Italy |
