= Grand Slam (rugby union) =

Rugby Union

In rugby union, a Grand Slam occurs when one team in the Six Nations Championship (or its Five Nations predecessor) beats all the others during one year's competition. This has been achieved 42 times in total, for the first time by Wales in 1908, and most recently by the Irish team in 2023. The team with the most Grand Slams is England with 13. It can also apply to the U20 and Women's Six Nations Championships.

In another context, a Grand Slam tour refers to a touring side – South Africa, Australia or New Zealand – which plays fixtures against all four home nations (England, Ireland, Scotland and Wales) during their tour. If the tourists win all of those matches, they are said to have achieved a Grand Slam. This has been done nine times, first by South Africa in 1912–13, and most recently by New Zealand in 2010.

== Five and Six Nations Grand Slams ==
In the annual Six Nations Championship (among England, Ireland, Scotland, Wales, France and Italy), and its predecessor the Five Nations Championship (before Italy joined in 2000), a Grand Slam occurs when one team beats all of the others during one year's competition. The Grand Slam winners are awarded the Six Nations trophy (as tournament winners), but there is no special grand slam trophy – the Grand Slam is an informal honour recognising a Championship-winning team which has won all their games.

A Grand Slam was therefore available in a total of 97 seasons to date. Grand Slams have been achieved 42 times – 13 by England, 12 by Wales, 10 by France, 4 by Ireland and 3 by Scotland. (Italy, involved in the tournament since 2000, have yet to win a Grand Slam.)

Two consecutive Grand Slams have been won by Wales in 1908–1909, by England in 1913–1914, 1923–1924 and 1991–1992, and by France in 1997–1998. No team has yet achieved three consecutive Grand Slams.

Prior to 2000, each team played four matches, two at home and two away from home. Following the inclusion of Italy in 2000, each team plays five matches, two at home and three away in one year, and the opposite in the following season. When Wales won the Grand Slam in 2005, it was the first time that the feat had been achieved by a team that had played more matches away than at home. This was repeated by Ireland in 2009 and 2023, by England in 2016, and by Wales in 2019.

Since 2017, the Six Nations Championship has used bonus points. A team that wins the Grand Slam will get three bonus points. This eliminates the possibility of a Grand Slam winner losing the championship on bonus points.

=== Table of Grand Slam winners ===
Team	Grand Slams	Five Nations Grand Slam winning seasons	Six Nations Grand Slam winning seasons
England	13	1913, 1914, 1921, 1923, 1924; 1928, 1957, 1980, 1991, 1992; 1995	2003, 2016
Wales	12	1908*, 1909*, 1911, 1950, 1952; 1971, 1976, 1978	2005, 2008, 2012, 2019
France	10	1968, 1977, 1981, 1987, 1997; 1998	2002, 2004, 2010, 2022
Ireland	4	1948	2009, 2018, 2023
Scotland	3	1925, 1984, 1990	
Italy	0	did not take part	

* In 1908 and 1909 matches with France were played, although they were not part of the Championship.

=== Chronological list of Grand Slam winners ===
Year	Team	Notes
Home Nations Championship
1908	Wales	*see note above
1909	Wales	*see note above
Five Nations Championship
1911	Wales	Also with the Triple Crown.
1913	England	Also with the Triple Crown.
1914	England	Already won the Triple Crown.
1915–19	No tournament due to World War I	
1921	England	Already won the Triple Crown.
1923	England	Already won the Triple Crown.
1924	England	Also won the Triple Crown.
1925	Scotland	Also won the Triple Crown.
1928	England	Also won the Triple Crown.
1932–39	France was suspended from the Five Nations Championship	
1940–46	No tournament due to World War II	
1948	Ireland	Also won the Triple Crown.
1950	Wales	Already won the Triple Crown.
1952	Wales	Already won the Triple Crown.
1957	England	Already won the Triple Crown.
1968	France	
1971	Wales	Already won the Triple Crown.
1976	Wales	Already won the Triple Crown.
1977	France	
1978	Wales	Already won the Triple Crown.
1980	England	Also won the Triple Crown.
1981	France	
1984	Scotland	Already won the Triple Crown.
1987	France	
1990	Scotland	Also won the Triple Crown.
1991	England	Already won the Triple Crown.
1992	England	Also won the Triple Crown.
1995	England	Also won the Triple Crown.
1997	France	
1998	France	
Six Nations Championship
2002	France	
2003	England	Also won the Triple Crown.
2004	France	
2005	Wales	Also won the Triple Crown.
2008	Wales	Already won the Triple Crown.
2009	Ireland	Also won the Triple Crown.
2010	France	
2012	Wales	Already won the Triple Crown.
2016	England	Already won the Triple Crown.
2018	Ireland	Also won the Triple Crown.
2019	Wales	Also won the Triple Crown.
2022	France	
2023	Ireland	Also won the Triple Crown.

== Grand Slam tours ==
A Grand Slam tour is one in which a touring national team from Australia, New Zealand, or South Africa plays test matches against all four home nations (England, Ireland, Scotland and Wales). If the tourists win all four of these games, they are said to have achieved a Grand Slam.

Some Grand Slam tours also include a test match against France; South Africa achieved a "Five Nations Grand Slam" in 1912–13 and 1951–52.

Grand Slams by touring teams have been achieved nine times: four times each by South Africa and New Zealand, and once by Australia.

Australia is the only country to have lost against all four home nations during a Grand Slam tour, on their 1957–58 tour. Australia also lost to France on that tour.

After 1984, Southern Hemisphere sides started to tour Britain and Ireland more frequently, but to play fewer tests on each tour, and thus there were no Grand Slam tours between 1984 and 1998. However, since 1998 Grand Slam tours have again become quite common, as the number of tests on each tour has increased. The All Blacks' tours of 2005 and 2008 were originally planned to include only three test matches; the late inclusion of matches against Wales and England respectively turned these into Grand Slam tours.

=== Grand Slams achieved by touring sides ===
South Africa	1912–13, 1931–32, 1951–52, 1960–61
New Zealand	1978, 2005, 2008, 2010
Australia	1984

=== Grand Slam tours ===
Year	Team	Achieved	W–D–L	Scores			
Year	Team	Achieved	W–D–L	England	Ireland	Scotland	Wales
1905–06	New Zealand	No	3–0–1	15–0	15–0	12–7	0–3
1906–07	South Africa	No	2–1–1	3–3	15–12	0–6	11–0
1912–13	South Africa	Yes	4–0–0	9–3	38–0	16–0	3–0
1927–28	Australia	No	2–0–2	11–18	5–3	8–10	18–8
1931–32	South Africa	Yes	4–0–0	7–0	8–3	6–3	8–3
1935–36	New Zealand	No	2–0–2	0–13	17–9	18–8	12–13
1939–40	Australia	Cancelled due to World War II					
1947–48	Australia	No	3–0–1	11–0	16–3	16–7	0–6
1951–52	South Africa	Yes	4–0–0	8–3	17–5	44–0	6–3
1953–54	New Zealand	No	3–0–1	5–0	14–3	3–0	8–13
1957–58	Australia	No	0–0–4	6–9	6–9	8–12	3–9
1960–61	South Africa	Yes	4–0–0	5–0	8–3	12–5	3–0
1963–64	New Zealand	No	3–1–0	14–0	6–5	0–0	6–0
1966–67	Australia	No	2–0–2	23–11	8–15	5–11	14–11
1969–70	South Africa	No	0–2–2	8–11	8–8	3–6	6–6
1972–73	New Zealand	No	3–1–0	9–0	10–10	14–9	19–16
1975–76	Australia	No	1–0–3	6–23	20–10	3–10	3–28
1978	New Zealand	Yes	4–0–0	16–6	10–6	18–9	13–12
1981–82	Australia	No	1–0–3	11–15	16–12	15–24	13–18
1984	Australia	Yes	4–0–0	19–3	16–9	37–12	28–9
1998	South Africa	No	3–0–1	7–13	27–13	35–10	28–20
2004	South Africa	No	2–0–2	16–32	12–17	45–10	38–36
2005	New Zealand	Yes	4–0–0	23–19	45–7	29–10	41–3
2008	New Zealand	Yes	4–0–0	32–6	22–3	32–6	29–9
2009	Australia	No	2–1–1	18–9	20–20	8–9	33–12
2010	New Zealand	Yes	4–0–0	26–16	38–18	49–3	37–25
2010	South Africa	No	3–0–1	21–11	23–21	17–21	29–25
2013	Australia	No	3–0–1	13–20	32–15	21–15	30–26
2016	Australia	No	2–0–2	21–37	24–27	23–22	32–8
2024	Australia	No	2–0–2	42–37	19–22	13–27	52–20
2025	New Zealand	No	3–0–1	19–33	26–13	25–17	52–26
Total		Yes 9–21 No	80–6–32	18–1–11	22–3–5	19–1–10	22–1–7

== The Rugby Championship ==
Although not commonly referred to as a Grand Slam, a similar concept exists in the southern hemisphere-based Rugby Championship whereby one team wins the championship by winning all its matches, six since the introduction of Argentina to the competition. In Rugby World Cup years, the championship is halved to three matches for each team to avoid fixture congestion, but winning with a 100% record is still recognised.

Year	Team	Notes
Tri Nations Series
1996	New Zealand	
1997	New Zealand	
1998	South Africa	
2003	New Zealand	
2010	New Zealand	
The Rugby Championship
2012	New Zealand	
2013	New Zealand	
2015	Australia	Only played three games due to the 2015 Rugby World Cup.
2016	New Zealand	
2017	New Zealand	
2023	New Zealand	Only played three games due to the 2023 Rugby World Cup.

== Rugby Europe Championship ==
The FIRA-AER Championship, laterly the Rugby europe Championship and often colloquially referred to as the 'B' Six Nations also recognised the concept of a grand slam until 2022, when a change to an 8-team tournament format of pool play followed by playoffs rendered the classic version impossible.

Year	Team	Notes
FIRA Tournament
1938	France	
FIRA Nations Cup
1965–66	France A	
1966–67	France A	
1967–68	France A	
1968–69	Romania	
1969–70	France A	
1970–71	France A	
1971–72	France A	
1972–73	France A	
FIRA Trophy
1973–74	France A	
1975–76	France A	
1976–77	Romania	
1977–78	France A	
1978–79	France A	
1979–80	France A	
1980–81	Romania	
1982–83	Romania	
1983–84	France A	
1984–85	France A	
As two-year cycled championship
1986–87	France A	France won in 1986.
1988–89	France A	France won in 1989.
1991–92	France A	France won in 1991 and 1992.
1995–97	Italy	Italy won in 1995 and 1997.
European Nations Cup First Division
2001	Georgia	
2002	Romania	
As two-year cycled championship
2003–04	Portugal	Portugal won in 2003.
2007–08	Georgia	Georgia won in 2008.
2011–12	Georgia	Georgia won in 2011.
2013–14	Georgia	Georgia won in 2014.
2015–16	Georgia	Georgia won in 2015 and 2016.
Rugby Europe Championship
2018	Georgia	
2019	Georgia	
2020	Georgia	
2021	Georgia	

== See also ==
- Six Nations Championship
- Triple Crown
- Six Nations Wooden Spoon
- Calcutta Cup
