= 1972–73 FIRA Nations Cup =

European rugby union championship

1972-73 Nations Cup
- Date: 27 November 1972 - 3 June 1973
- Countries: France; Morocco; Romania; Spain

Tournament statistics
- Champions: France
- Matches played: 6

The Nations Cup 1972-73 was the 13th edition of a European rugby union championship for national teams, and eighth (and last) with the formula and the name of "Nations Cup".

The tournament was won by France, who won all their three games, with Romania, Spain and Morocco.

== First division ==
- Table

Place	Nation	Games				Points			Table points
Place	Nation	played	won	drawn	lost	for	against	difference	Table points
1	France	3	3	0	0	118	35	83	9
2	Romania	3	2	0	1	91	37	54	7
3	Spain	3	1	0	2	56	55	1	5
4	Morocco	3	0	0	3	24	162	-138	3

- Results

Point system: try 4 pt, conversion: 2 pt., penalty kick 3 pt. drop 3 pt, goal from mark 3 pt.
Click "show" for more info about match (scorers, line-up etc)

27 November 1972	Romania	6 - 15	France	Constanta
	Pen: Nica 2		Try: Trillo; Con: Romeu; Pen: Romeu 3	Referee: J. Young (Scotland)
Romania:15.Radu Durbac, 14.Gheorghie Nica, 13.Gheorghie Dragomirescu-Rahtopol, 12.I. Marica, 11.Mihai Suciu, 10.Mihai Nicolescu, 9.D. Rascanu, 8.Nicolae Postolachi, 7.Gheorgie Rascanu (cap.), 6.Constantin Fugigi, 5.Gheorghie Daraban, 4.Constantin Serban, 3.Mircea Ciornei, 2.Mircea Ortelecan, 1.Constantin Dinu - replacements: 16.Sergiu Bargaunas, 17.Alexandru Pop				Referee: J. Young (Scotland)
France:15.Michel Droitecourt, 14.Jean-Pierre Lux, 13.Claude Dourthe, 12.Jean Trillo, 11.Andre Campaes, 10.Jean-Pierre Romeu, 9.Jacques Fouroux, 8.Walter Spanghero (cap.), 7.Pierre Biemouret, 6.Michel Yachvili, 5.Alain Esteve, 4.Elie Cester, 3.Jean Iraçabal, 2.Rene Benesis, 1.Jean-Louis Azarete

3 March 1973

Morocco	6 - 73	France B

Casablanca

11 March 1973

Morocco	9 - 20	Spain

Casablanca

14 April 1973

Romania	16 - 13	Spain

Constanta

20 April 1973

Romania	69 - 9	Morocco

Bucharest

3 June 1973

Spain	23 - 30	France B

La Foixarda, Barcelona

== Second Division ==
=== Pool 1 ===
8 October 1972

Poland	23 - 9	Czechoslovakia

Warsaw

7 April 1973

Czechoslovakia	6 - 16	Poland

Prague

- Aggregate: Poland 39- Czechoslovakia 15

=== Pool 2 ===
- Table

Place	Nation	Games				Points			Table points
Place	Nation	played	won	drawn	lost	for	against	difference	Table points
1	Portugal	2	1	1	0	12	9	3	5
2	Italy	2	1	0	1	19	21	-2	4
3	Yugoslavia	2	0	1	1	15	16	-1	3

- Results

Point system: try 4 pt, conversion: 2 pt., penalty kick 3 pt. drop 3 pt, goal from mark 3 pt.
Click "show" for more info about match (scorers, line-up etc)

26 November 1972	Italy	13 - 12	Yugoslavia	Aosta

25 February 1973	Portugal	9 - 6	Italy	Coimbra

8 April 1973

Yugoslavia	3 - 3	Portugal

Makarska

=== Final ===
22 April 1973

Poland	35 - 13	Portugal

Warsaw

13 May 1973

Portugal	13 - 3	Poland

Coimbra

- Aggregate: Poland 38 - Portugal 26
- Poland promoted to division 1

== Bibliography ==
- (in Italian) Francesco Volpe, Valerio Vecchiarelli (2000), 2000 Italia in Meta, Storia della nazionale italiana di rugby dagli albori al Sei Nazioni, GS Editore (2000) ISBN 88-87374-40-6
- (in Italian) Francesco Volpe, Paolo Pacitti (Author), Rugby 2000, GTE Gruppo Editorale (1999).
