= 1970–71 FIRA Nations Cup =

European rugby union championship

1970-71 Nations Cup
- Date: 29 November 1970 - 9 May 1971
- Countries: France; Italy; Morocco; Romania

Tournament statistics
- Champions: France
- Matches played: 6

The Nations Cup 1970-71 was the 11th edition of a European rugby union championship for national teams, and sixth with the formula and the name of "Nations Cup".

The tournament was won by France, who swept all their matches.

== First division ==
- Table

Place	Nation	Games				Points			Table points
Place	Nation	played	won	drawn	lost	for	against	difference	Table points
1	France	3	3	0	0	57	19	38	9
2	Romania	3	2	0	1	60	20	40	7
3	Morocco	3	1	0	2	11	37	-26	5
4	Italy	3	0	0	3	25	77	-52	0

Italy relegated to division 2

- Results

Point system: try 3 pt, conversion: 2 pt., penalty kick 3 pt. drop 3 pt, goal from mark 3 pt.
Click "show" for more info about match (scorers, line-up etc)

29 November 1970	Romania	3 - 14	France	Dimaolun Stadion, Bucharest
	Pen: Irimescu		Try: Pebeyre; Con: Villepreux; Pen: Villepreux 3	Attendance: 10000; Referee: G.Lamb (England)
Romania:15.Radu Durbac, 14.M. Braga, 13.Gheorghie Dragomirescu-Rahtopol, 12.Gheorghie Nica, 11.Mihai Suciu, 10.Valeriu Irimescu, 9.Adrian Mateescu, 8.Ion Tutuianu, 7.Gheorgie Rascanu, 6.Paul Ciobanel (cap), 5.Alexandru Atanasiu, 4.Constantin Serban, 3.C. Dragulescu, 2.Valeriu Iorgulescu, 1.Constantin Dinu				Attendance: 10000; Referee: G.Lamb (England)
France15.Pierre Villepreux, 14.Roger Bourgarel, 13.Jean Trillo, 12.Jean-Pierre Lux, 11.Jack Cantoni, 10.Jean-Louis Bérot, 9.Michel Pebeyre, 8.Benoit Dauga (cap), 7.Gerard Viard, 6.Andre Quilis, 5.Jean le Droff, 4.Walter Spanghero, 3.Jean Iraçabal, 2.Rene Benesis, 1.Jean-Louis Azarete

20 December 1970

Morocco	3 - 6	France XV

COC Stadium Casablanca

21 February 1971	Italy	6 - 8	Morocco	Arenaccia, Naples
	Try: Dotto; Pen: Ambron		Try: Khabbar, Charlier; Con: Doukali	Referee: Witting (Romania)
Italy15. Lelio Lazzarini, 14. Pierluigi Pacifici, 13. Vittorio Ambron, 12. Maurizio Finocchi, 11. Francesco Dotto, 10. Aldo Caluzzi, 9.Umberto Conforto, 8.Marco Bollesan (cap), 7.Franco Valier, 6.Loris Salsi, 5.Francesco di Maura, 4.Umberto Cossara, 3.Ettore Abbiati, 2.Pietro Monfeli, 1.Massimo Gini				Referee: Witting (Romania)
Morocco:15. Charlier, 14. Fatallah (41' Zaoui II), 13. Soulimi, 12. Khabbar, 11. Hubert, 10.Ben Moussa, 9.Lakrari, 8.Moumen, 7.Gam Tarussom, 6.Kossai, 5.Zaoui I, 4.Doukali, 3.Dramar, 2.Tourmet, 1.Chititi

28 February 1971	France B	37 - 13	Italy	Nice
				Referee: Jones (Wales)
France B:15. Bergascau, 14. Amade, 13. Mazas, 12. Nadal, 11. Laubie, 10.De Matos, 9.Foroux, 8.Bofelli, 7.Faillon, 6.Herrero (Biescas), 5.Sappa, 4.Savitski, 3.Laurent, 2.Ugartemendia, 1.Martin (Rougerie)				Referee: Jones (Wales)
Italy:15. Luciano Modonesi, 14. Aldo Caluzzi, 13. Lelio Lazzarini, 12. Claudio Della Valle, 11. Pierluigi Pacifici (Francesco Dotto), 10. Gianmatteo Cecchin, 9.Umberto Conforto, 8.Marco Bollesan (cap), 7.Lucio Boccaletto, 6.Giuseppe Puglisi, 5.Umberto Cossara, 4.Ivo Mazzucchelli, 3.Ettore Abbiati, 2.Pietro Monfeli (Alessandro Brunelli), 1.Massimo Gini - replacements: 16. Francesco Dotto, 17. Alessandro Brunelli

11 April 1971	Romania	32 - 6	Italy	Bucharest
	Try: Demian, Rascanu; Suciu 2, Teleasa 3 Con: Durbac 4 Drop: Durbac		Pen: Michelon 2	Referee: Dubernet (France)
Romania:15. Radu Durbac, 14. Mihai Suciu, 13. Gheorghie Dragomirescu-Rahtopol, 12. Gheorghie Nica, 11.D. Teleasa, 10. Mihai Nicolescu, 9.Sergiu Bargaunas, 8.Radu Demian, 7.Alexandru Pop, 6.Gheorgie Rascanu, 5.Constantin Serban, 4.Alexandru Atanasiu, 3.Nicolae Baciu, 2.V. Onutiu, 1.C. Dragulescu - replacements: 16. Dumitru Mihai				Referee: Dubernet (France)

9 May 1971

Morocco	0 - 25	Romania

COC Stadium Casablanca

== Second Division ==
=== Pool 1 ===
- Table

Place	Nation	Games				Points			Table points
Place	Nation	played	won	drawn	lost	for	against	difference	Table points
1	Czechoslovakia	2	2	0	0	28	3	+25	6
2	Yugoslavia	2	0	0	2	3	28	-25	2

- Results

Point system: try 3 pt, conversion: 2 pt., penalty kick 3 pt. drop 3 pt, goal from mark 3 pt.

24 October 1970

Czechoslovakia	19 - 3	Yugoslavia

Havířov

29 November 1970

Yugoslavia	0 - 9	Czechoslovakia

Zagreb

=== Pool 2 ===
- Table

Place	Nation	Games				Points			Table points
Place	Nation	played	won	drawn	lost	for	against	difference	Table points
1	Spain	2	2	0	0	23	0	23	6
2	Portugal	2	0	0	1	0	23	-23	1

- Results

Point system: try 3 pt, conversion: 2 pt., penalty kick 3 pt. drop 3 pt, goal from mark 3 pt.

20 December 1970

Spain	17 - 0	Portugal

Estadio Nacional Complutense, Madrid

21 January 1971

Portugal	0 – 6 Portugal withdraw	Spain

=== Final ===
(Belgium directly admitted)

- Table

Place	Nation	Games				Points			Table points
Place	Nation	played	won	drawn	lost	for	against	difference	Table points
1	Czechoslovakia	2	2	0	0	37	18	+19	6
2	Spain	2	1	0	1	50	12	+38	4
3	Belgium	2	0	0	2	12	69	-57	2

Czechoslovakia promoted in first division

- Results

Point system: try 3 pt, conversion: 2 pt., penalty kick 3 pt. drop 3 pt, goal from mark 3 pt.

18 April 1971

Belgium	0 - 44	Spain

Brussels

25 April 1971

Spain	6 - 12	Czechoslovakia

Estadio Nacional Complutense, Madrid

8 May 1971

Czechoslovakia	25 - 12	Belgium

Říčany
