= 1973–74 FIRA Trophy =

European rugby union championship

1973–74 Fira Trophy
- Date: 11 November 1973 – 19 May 1974
- Countries: France; Morocco; Poland; Romania; Spain

Tournament statistics
- Champions: France
- Matches played: 9

The 1973–1974 FIRA Trophy was the 14th edition of a European rugby union championship for national teams, and first with the formula and the name of "FIRA Trophy".

The tournament was won by France, with a Grand Slam. Romania finished in the 2nd place, with a single loss, and Spain in the 3rd place, with two wins and two losses. Italy won the Second Division, earning the right to return to the First Division for the following season.

== First division ==
- Table

Place	Nation	Games				Points			Table points
Place	Nation	played	won	drawn	lost	for	against	difference	Table points
1	France	4	4	0	0	76	16	+60	12
2	Romania	4	3	0	1	68	31	+37	10
3	Spain	4	2	0	2	42	35	+7	8
4	Poland	3	1	0	2	14	24	-10	5
5	Morocco	4	0	0	4	12	106	-94	4

- Poland and Marocco relegated to division 2
- Results

Point system: try 4 pt, conversion: 2 pt., penalty kick 3 pt. drop 3 pt, goal from mark 3 pt.
Click "show" for more info about match (scorers, line-up etc)

- France-Poland not played (Poland forfait)

11 November 1973	France	7–6	Romania	Valence d'Agen
	Try: Bertranne; Drop: Romeu		Pen: Durbac 2	Attendance: 11,474; Referee: Patrick d'Arcy (Republic of Ireland)
France:15.Jean-Michel Aguirre, 14.Roland Bertranne, 13.Gilles Delaigue, 12.Jo Maso, 11.Rene Seguier, 10.Jean-Pierre Romeu, 9.Max Barrau (cap.), 8.Olivier Saïsset, 7.Victor Boffelli, 6.Jean-Claude Skrela, 5.Michel Sappa, 4.Elie Cester, 3.Jean Costantino, 2.Rene Benesis, 1.Jean-Louis Azarete				Attendance: 11,474; Referee: Patrick d'Arcy (Republic of Ireland)
Romania: 15.Radu Durbac, 14.Ion Constantin, 13.Gheorghe Dragomirescu-Rahtopol, 12.I. Marica, 11.Gheorghe Nica, 10.Mihai Nicolescu, 9.Adrian Mateescu (cap.), 8.Nicolae Postolachi, 7.Constantin Fugigi, 6.Alexandru Pop, 5.Constantin Șerban, 4.Gheorghe Dumitru, 3.Mircea Ciornei, 2.Mircea Munteanu, 1.Constantin Dinu

28 February 1974

Spain	7–15	France XV

Estadio Nacional Complutense, Madrid

3 March 1974

Morocco	9–22	Romania

Casablanca

10 March 1974

France XV	54–3	Morocco

Stade Marcel-Deflandre, La Rochelle

31 March 1974

Spain	22–0	Morocco

Estadio Nacional Complutense, Madrid

14 April 1974

Romania	20–6	Poland

Bucharest

28 April 1974

Morocco	0–8	Poland

Casablanca

12 May 1974

Poland	0–4	Spain

Konylisy, Poznań

19 May 1974

Romania	20–9	Spain

Timișoara

== Second Division ==
Portugal withdrew from the tournament after playing only two matches due to the political situation after the Carnation Revolution.

- Table

Place	Nation	Games				Points			Table points
Place	Nation	played	won	drawn	lost	for	against	difference	Table points
1	Italy	4	3	1	0	55	23	+32	11
2	Czechoslovakia	4	2	2	0	41	12	+29	10
3	West Germany	4	2	1	1	56	40	+16	9
4	Yugoslavia	4	1	0	3	18	77	-59	6
5	Portugal	4	0	0	4	13	31	-18	2

Italy and Czechoslovakia promoted to division 2

- Results

Point system: try 4 pt, conversion: 2 pt., penalty kick 3 pt. drop 3 pt, goal from mark 3 pt.
Click "show" for more info about match (scorers, line-up etc)

21 October 1973

Czechoslovakia	32–3	Yugoslavia

Prague

4 November 1973

Italy	3–3	Czechoslovakia

Stadio Mario Battaglini, Rovigo

11 November 1973

Yugoslavia	7–25	Italy

Zagreb

10 February 1974

Portugal	3–11	Italy

Lisbon

7 April 1974

West Germany	20–10	Portugal

Hanover

1 May 1974

Yugoslavia	8–20	West Germany

Makarska

5 May 1974

Italy	16–10	West Germany

Rho

26 May 1974

West Germany	6–6	Czechoslovakia

Hanover

1974

Czechoslovakia	6–0; Portugal withdraw	Portugal

1974

Yugoslavia	6–0; Portugal withdraw	Portugal

== Bibliography ==
- (in Italian) Francesco Volpe, Valerio Vecchiarelli (2000), 2000 Italia in Meta, Storia della nazionale italiana di rugby dagli albori al Sei Nazioni, GS Editore (2000) ISBN 88-87374-40-6.
- (in Italian) Francesco Volpe, Paolo Pacitti (Author), Rugby 2000, GTE Gruppo Editorale (1999).
