= 2000–01 European Nations Cup Second Division =

2000 European Nations Cup Second Division
- Date: 14 October 2000 - 26 May 2001
- Countries: Poland; Ukraine; Germany; Croatia; Czech Republic; Denmark

Tournament statistics
- Champions: Poland
- Matches played: 9

The 2001 European Nations Cup (ENC) Second Division (a European rugby union competition for national teams) was contested over a one-year period during which all teams met each other once. Poland was the winner.

Due to European qualify round to RWC 2003 there's no relegation to division 3 and promotion to division 1

== Table ==
Place	Nation	Games				Points			Table points
Place	Nation	played	won	drawn	lost	for	against	difference	Table points
1	Poland	5	4	0	1	105	53	+52	13
2	Ukraine	5	4	0	1	65	61	+4	13
3	Germany	5	2	1	2	90	86	+4	10
4	Croatia	5	2	1	2	70	77	−7	10
5	Czech Republic	5	2	0	3	132	109	23	9
6	Denmark	5	0	0	5	53	129	−76	5

== Results ==
14 October 2000

Czech Republic	35–3	Ukraine

Prague

21 October 2000

Ukraine	16–6	Denmark

Kyiv

22 October 2000

Germany	13–26	Poland

Berlin

28 October 2000

Denmark	15–16	Croatia

Copenhagen

4 November 2000

Poland	34–16	Czech Republic

Gdynia

12 November 2000

Germany	12–19	Ukraine

Heusenstamm

18 November 2000

Croatia	3–8	Poland

Zaprešić

8 April 2001

Germany	30–17	Czech Republic

Constance

28 April 2001

Croatia	32–22	Czech Republic

Makarska

28 April 2001

Denmark	10–21	Germany

Copenhagen

5 May 2001

Poland	34–12	Denmark

Gdynia

19 May 2001

Czech Republic	42–10	Denmark

Prague

19 May 2001

Ukraine	9–3	Poland

20 May 2001

Croatia	14–14	Germany

Split

26 May 2001

Ukraine	18–5	Croatia

Kyiv

== See also ==
- 2001 European Nations Cup First Division
- 2003 Rugby World Cup – European qualification
