= Czechoslovak Rugby Union =

Sporting body

Československá rugbyová unie
- Sport: Rugby union
- Founded: 1926
- World Rugby affiliation: 1988
- FIRA affiliation: 1934

The Czechoslovak Rugby Union (Czech: Československá rugbyová unie) was the governing body for rugby in Czechoslovakia. It was responsible for the national leagues as well as the national teams.

== History ==
The Union was founded as the Czechoslovak Rugby Football Association (Czech: Československý svaz rugby-footballu) in 1928 with Antonín Trlica as the first president and 160 registered players. Famous Czech writer and illustrator Ondřej Sekora was the second president of the association. In 1990 the name changed to the Czechoslovak Rugby Union (Czech: Československá rugbyová unie) with Miloš Dobrý as the last president before the split of Czechoslovakia.

== See also ==
- Rugby union in the Czech Republic
- Czech Rugby Union
- Czechoslovakia national rugby union team
