= 1977–78 FIRA Trophy =

European rugby union championship

1977-78 FIRA Trophy
- Date: 2 October 1977 – 28 May 1978
- Countries: Czechoslovakia; France; Italy; Romania; Poland; Spain

Tournament statistics
- Champions: France
- Matches played: 15

The 1977-1978 FIRA Trophy was the 18th edition of a European rugby union championship for national teams.

The tournament was won by France, with a Grand Slam. Romania finished in 2nd place, while Spain had a surprising 3rd place, defeating Italy (10-3), in Madrid, to repeat the same place of the previous tournament. Italy had a very disappointing performance, finishing in 5th place, below Poland, who also beat them (12-6).

== First Division ==
- Table

Place	Nation	Games				Points			Table points
Place	Nation	played	won	drawn	lost	for	against	difference	Table points
1	France	5	5	0	0	158	77	+81	15
2	Romania	5	3	1	1	190	49	+141	12
3	Spain	5	3	0	2	64	134	-70	11
4	Poland	5	2	0	3	93	110	-17	9
5	Italy	5	1	1	3	38	67	-29	8
6	Czechoslovakia	5	0	0	5	61	167	-106	5

Czechoslovakia relegated to division 2

- Results

Point system: try 4 pt, conversion: 2 pt., penalty kick 3 pt. drop 3 pt
Click "show" for more info about match (scorers, line-up etc)

2 October 1977

France XV	63 - 35	Czechoslovakia

Stade Municipal, Hagondange

23 October 1977

Poland	12 - 6	Italy

Warsaw

29 October 1977

Czechoslovakia	4 - 10	Italy

Prague

5 November 1977

Romania	38 - 21	Poland

Bucharest

26 November 1977	Italy	10 - 10	Romania	Stadio Comunale, Reggio Calabria
	Try: Ghizzoni; Pen: Collodo, Gaetaniello		Try: Motrescu; Drop: Bucos 2	Referee: David Burnett (Ireland)
Italy: 15.Fabrizio Gaetaniello, 14.Manrico Marchetto, 13.Nello Francescato, 12.Bruno Francescato, 11.Serafino Ghizzoni, 10.Oscar Collodo, 9.Gianni Franceschini, 8.Salvatore Bonetti (cap.), 7.Fiorenzo Blessano, 6.Loris Salsi, 5.Giuseppe Artuso, 4.Adriano Fedrigo, 3.Pasquale Presutti, 2.Pietro Monfeli, 1.Nick Screnci - replacements: 16.Andrea Lijoi				Referee: David Burnett (Ireland)
Romania: 15.Teodorin Tudose, 14.Petre Ianusevici, 13.Gheorghe Nica, 12.Ion Enache, 11.Petre Motrescu, 10.Mihai Bucos, 9.Eduard Suciu, 8.Florică Murariu, 7.Pompiliu Borș, 6.Enciu Stoica, 5.I. Pintea, 4.Marin Ionescu, 3.Iancu Băcioiu, 2.Mircea Ortelecan, 1.Constantin Dinu

10 December 1977	France	9 - 6	Romania	Stade Marcel-Michelin, Clermont Ferrand
	Pen: Romeu 3		Pen: Bucos; Drop: A. Dumitru	Referee: Hughes (England)
Italy: 15.Jean-Michel Aguirre, 14.Jean-Luc Averous, 13.Roland Bertranne, 12.Christian Bélascain, 11.Guy Noves, 10.Jean-Pierre Romeu, 9.Jacques Fouroux (cap.), 8.Alain Guilbert, 7.Jean-Claude Skrela, 6.Jean-Pierre Rives, 5.Michel Palmie, 4.Michel Sappa, 3.Pierre Dospital, 2.Alain Paco, 1.Gerard Cholley				Referee: Hughes (England)
Romania: 15.Mihai Bucos, 14.Petre Ianusevici, 13.Gheorghe Nica (cap.), 12.Vladimir Vasile, 11.Petre Motrescu, 10.Alexandru Dumitru, 9.Mircea Paraschiv, 8.Gheorghe Dumitru, 7.Enciu Stoica, 6.Florică Murariu, 5.Marin Ionescu, 4.I. Pintea, 3.Corneliu Scarlat, 2.Mircea Ortelecan, 1.Constantin Dinu

17 December 1977	Spain	10 - 3	Italy	Estadio de Vallehermoso, Madrid
	Try: Roca (3'); Bueno (66'); Con: Moriche (3')		Drop: Collodo (13')
Italy: 15.Fabrizio Gaetaniello, 14.Manrico Marchetto, 13.Nello Francescato, 12.Bruno Francescato, 11.Serafino Ghizzoni, 10.Oscar Collodo, 9.Gianni Francheschini, 8.Salvatore Bonetti (cap.), 7.Fiorenzo Blessano, 6.Loris Salsi, 5.Claudio Appiani, 4.Adriano Federigo, 3.Pasquale Presutti, 2.Pietro Monfeli, 1.Nick Screnci
Spain: 15.José Ramón Apraiz Feliu, 14.José Luis Ruiz Cristín, 13.Javier Goicoechea, 12.Alfonso Feijoo, 11.José Antonio Bueno, 10.Manolo Moriche (cap.), 9.Santago Noriega, 8.Francisco Soler, 7.Carlos Roca, 6.Alberto Errandonea, 5.Ignacio Álvarez Cienfuegos, 4.Angel Garcia Guerrero, 3.Javier Camiña, 2Gabriel Zapiain., 1.Luis Mocoroa; Replacements: Carlos Romero Moreno

1978

France XV	35 - 24	Poland

Stadium Municipal, Albi

29 January 1978

Spain	3 - 20	France XV
		Try: Ruiz Cristin (15'); Bueno (26'); Feijoo (66'); Romero (78'); Con: Apraiz (78'); Pen: Apraiz (44')

Estadio de Vallehermoso, Madrid

4 February 1978

Italy	9 - 31	France XV

Stadio Tommaso Fattori, L'Aquila

9 April 1978

Romania	60 - 6	Czechoslovakia

Bucharest

16 April 1978

Romania	76 - 3	Spain

Stadionul Dinamo, Bucharest

7 May 1978

Spain	20 - 13	Czechoslovakia

CN Montjuïc, Barcelona

21 May 1978

Poland	22 - 28	Spain

Warsaw

28 May 1978

Czechoslovakia	3 - 14	Poland

Vyškov

== Second Division ==
=== Pool 1 ===
- Table

Place	Nation	Games				Points			Table points
Place	Nation	played	won	drawn	lost	for	against	difference	Table points
1	Yugoslavia	2	2	0	0	26	0	+26	6
2	Morocco	2	1	0	1	25	20	+5	4
3	Belgium	2	0	0	2	0	31	-31	2

- Results

1 July 1977

Morocco	0 - 20	Yugoslavia

Casablanca

29 October 1977

Belgium	0 - 25	Morocco

Brussels

Yugoslavia	6-0 forfait	Belgium

=== Pool 2 ===
- Table

Place	Nation	Games				Points			Table points
Place	Nation	played	won	drawn	lost	for	against	difference	Table points
1	Soviet Union	2	2	0	0	102	15	+87	6
2	Sweden	2	1	0	1	22	49	-27	4
3	West Germany	2	0	0	2	20	80	-60	2

- Results

9 October 1977

Sweden	6 - 38	Soviet Union

Vanersborg

30 October 1977

West Germany	11 - 16	Sweden

Berlin

9 May 1978

Soviet Union	64 - 9	West Germany

Kharkov

=== Finals ===
14 May 1978

Yugoslavia	3 - 18	Soviet Union

Sarajevo

18 May 1978

Yugoslavia	6 - 16	Soviet Union

Travnik

Soviet Union promoted to division 1

== Bibliography ==
- (in Italian) Francesco Volpe, Valerio Vecchiarelli (2000), 2000 Italia in Meta, Storia della nazionale italiana di rugby dagli albori al Sei Nazioni, GS Editore (2000) ISBN 88-87374-40-6.
- (in Italian) Francesco Volpe, Paolo Pacitti (Author), Rugby 2000, GTE Gruppo Editorale (1999).
