= 1974–75 FIRA Trophy =

European rugby union championship

1974-75 FIRA Trophy
- Date: 13 October 1973 -10 May 1975
- Countries: France; Czechoslovakia; Italy; Romania; Spain

Tournament statistics
- Champions: Romania
- Matches played: 10

The 1974-1975 FIRA Trophy was the 15th edition of a Continental European rugby union championship for national teams, and the second with the formula and name of "FIRA Trophy".

The tournament was won by Romania, who defeated France in the opening match.

== First division ==
- Table

Place	Nation	Games				Points			Table points
Place	Nation	played	won	drawn	lost	for	against	difference	Table points
1	Romania	4	3	1	0	50	31	+19	11
2	France	4	3	0	1	108	30	+78	10
3	Italy	4	2	1	1	80	31	+49	9
4	Spain	4	1	0	3	31	88	-57	6
5	Czechoslovakia	4	0	0	4	25	114	-89	4

- Czechoslovakia relegated to division 2
- Results

Point system: try 4 pt, conversion: 2 pt., penalty kick 3 pt. drop 3 pt, goal from mark 3 pt.
Click "show" for more info about match (scorers, line-up etc)

13 October 1974	Romania	15 - 10	France	Stadionul Dinamo, Bucharest
	Try: Marica; Con: Durbac; Pen: Durbac 2, Nica		Try: Gourdon; Pen: Romeu 2	Referee: K.A. Pattinson (England)
Romania: 15.Radu Durbac, 14.Ion Constantin, 13.I. Marica, 12.Gheorghe Nica, 11.M. Burghelea, 10.Mihai Nicolescu, 9.Petre Florescu, 8.Gheorghe Dumitru, 7.Ion Tătucu, 6.Alexandru Pop (cap.), 5.Nicolae Postolachi, 4.Gheorghe Daraban, 3.Mircea Ciornei, 2.Mircea Munteanu, 1.Constantin Dinu				Referee: K.A. Pattinson (England)
France: 15.Jean-Michel Aguirre, 14.Jean-Francois Gourdon, 13.Roland Bertranne, 12.Jean-Martin Etchenique, 11.Laurent Desnoyer, 10.Jean-Pierre Romeu, 9.Jacques Fouroux (cap.), 8.Claude Spanghero, 7.Victor Boffelli, 6.Jean-Claude Skrela, 5.Alain Esteve, 4.Georges Senal, 3.Jean-Louis Azarete, 2.Alain Paco, 1.Armand Vaquerin

17 November 1974

Czechoslovakia	6 - 16	Romania

Šumperk

15 December 1974

France XV	36 - 3	Czechoslovakia

Stade Marcel-Verchère, Bourg-en-Bresse

2 February 1975

France XV	46 - 3	Spain

Stade Marius-Rodrigo, Mauléon-Licharre

15 February 1975

Italy	9 - 16	France XV

Stadio Flaminio, Rome

6 April 1975

Spain	3 - 19	Italy

Estadio Nacional Complutense, Madrid

27 April 1975	Romania	3 - 3	Italy	Stadionul Dinamo, Bucharest
	Pen: Nica		Drop: Ponzi	Referee: A. Cuny (France)
Romania: 15.Radu Durbac, 14.Ion Constantin, 13.I. Marica, 12.Gheorghe Nica, 11.M. Burghelea, 10.Mihai Nicolescu, 9.Sergiu Bărgăunaș, 8.Nicolae Postolachi, 7.Constantin Fugigi, 6.Alexandru Pop, 5.Dumitru Mușat, 4.Gheorghe Daraban, 3.Mircea Ciornei, 2.Mircea Munteanu, 1.Constantin Dinu - replacements: Petre Ianusevici				Referee: A. Cuny (France)
Italy: 15.Luciano Modonesi, 14.Manrico Marchetto, 13.Fiorenzo Blessano, 12.Pietro Vezzani, 11.Elio de Anna, 10.Ennio Ponzi, 9.Angelo Visentin, 8.Salvatore Bonetti, 7.Loris Salsi, 6.Umberto Cossara, 5.Adriano Fedrigo, 4.Ivo Mazzucchelli (cap.), 3.Ambrogio Bona, 2.Paolo Ferracin, 1.Fulvio di Carlo

27 April 1975

Czechoslovakia	7 - 13	Spain

Prague

4 May 1975

Spain	12 - 16	Romania

Estadio Nacional Complutense, Madrid

10 May 1975

Italy	49 - 9	Czechoslovakia

Stadio Comunale, Reggio Calabria

== Second Division ==
- Table

Place	Nation	Games				Points			Table points
Place	Nation	played	won	drawn	lost	for	against	difference	Table points
1	Poland	3	3	0	0	68	29	+39	9
2	Netherlands	3	2	0	1	78	52	+ 26	7
3	West Germany	3	1	0	2	46	72	-26	5
4	Morocco	3	0	0	3	21	60	-39	3

- Netherlands and Poland promoted to division 1
- Results

19 October 1974

Netherlands	32 - 21	West Germany

Sportpark De Zoom, Wageningen

16 March 1975

Morocco	3 - 15	Poland

Casablanca

6 April 1975

Poland	24 - 20	Netherlands

Ostrołęka

13 April 1975

West Germany	19 - 11	Morocco

Fritz-Grunebaum-Sportpark, Heidelberg

4 May 1975

Poland	29 - 6	West Germany

Warsaw

1975

Netherlands	26 - 7	Morocco

Sportpark Berestein, Hilversum

== Bibliography ==
- (in Italian) Francesco Volpe, Valerio Vecchiarelli (2000), 2000 Italia in Meta, Storia della nazionale italiana di rugby dagli albori al Sei Nazioni, GS Editore (2000) ISBN 88-87374-40-6.
- (in Italian) Francesco Volpe, Paolo Pacitti (Author), Rugby 2000, GTE Gruppo Editorale (1999).
