= Michel Sappa =

France international rugby union player

- Born: 19 March 1949 (age 77) Toulon, France
- Height: 6 ft 5 in (196 cm)
- Weight: 224 lb (102 kg)

Rugby union career
- Position: Lock
International career
Years	Team	Apps	(Points)
1973–77	France	3	(0)

Michel Sappa (born 19 March 1949) is a former French international rugby union player.

Sappa was a giant lock forward, standing just short of two metres.

Originally with RC Toulon, Sappa came to RC Nice in 1972 and the following year gained his first international call up. He debuted for France against Japan in Bordeaux and was capped a second time that year during the 1973–74 FIRA Trophy, before gaining his third and final cap came against Romania in 1977.

== See also ==
- List of France national rugby union players
