= 1975–76 FIRA Trophy =

European rugby union championship

1975-76 FIRA Trophy
- Date: 25 October 1975 - 15 May 1976
- Countries: France; Italy; Romania; Netherlands; Poland; Spain

Tournament statistics
- Champions: France
- Matches played: 15

The 1975–1976 FIRA Trophy was the 16th edition of a European rugby union championship for national teams.

The tournament was won by France, with a Grand Slam. Italy finished in 2nd, with a single loss to France, ahead of Romania, which finished in 3rd, with two losses. France awarded caps only in its game with Romania.

== First division ==
- Table

| Place | Nation | Games | | | | Points | | | Table points |
| Place | Nation | played | won | drawn | lost | for | against | difference | Table points |
|---|---|---|---|---|---|---|---|---|---|
| 1 | France | 5 | 5 | 0 | 0 | 200 | 47 | +153 | 15 |
| 2 | Italy | 5 | 4 | 0 | 1 | 95 | 54 | +41 | 13 |
| 3 | Romania | 5 | 3 | 0 | 2 | 87 | 68 | +19 | 11 |
| 4 | Poland | 5 | 2 | 0 | 3 | 69 | 99 | -30 | 9 |
| 5 | Spain | 5 | 0 | 1 | 4 | 31 | 92 | -61 | 6 |
| 6 | Netherlands | 5 | 0 | 1 | 4 | 16 | 138 | -122 | 6 |

- Netherlands relegated to division 2 (for worst point difference)
- Results

Point system: try 4 pt, conversion: 2 pt., penalty kick 3 pt. drop 3 pt, goal from mark 3 pt.
Click "show" for more info about match (scorers, line-up etc)

25 October 1975

| Italy | 28 - 13 | Poland |

Stadio Comunale di Monigo, Treviso

2 November 1975

| Romania | 20 - 9 | Poland |

Stadionul Parcul Copilului, Bucharest

23 November 1975

| Netherlands | 0 - 24 | Italy |

Apeldoorn

| 23 November 1975 | France | 36 - 12 | Romania | Parc Lescure, Bordeaux |
| | Try: Dubertrand 3, Fouroux, Bastiat, Pécune; Con: Romeu 3 Pen: Bastiat, Romeu | | Pen: Bucos 3 Drop: Bucos | Referee: Norman Sanson (Scotland) |
| France: 15.Michel Droitecourt, 14.Jean-Francois Gourdon, 13.Roland Bertranne, 12.Joël Pécune, 11.André Dubertrand, 10.Jean-Pierre Romeu, 9.Jacques Fouroux (cap.), 8.Jean-Pierre Bastiat, 7.Jean-Claude Skrela, 6.Jean-Pierre Rives, 5.Michel Palmie, 4.Francis Haget, 3.Robert Paparemborde, 2.Alain Paco, 1.Gerard Cholley | | | | Referee: Norman Sanson (Scotland) |
Romania: 15.Radu Durbac, 14.Ion Constantin, 13.Gheorghe Nica, 12.Mihai Nicolescu, 11.Petre Motrescu, 10.Mihai Bucos, 9.Mircea Paraschiv, 8.Gheorghe Dumitru, 7.Enciu Stoica, 6.Alexandru Pop (cap.), 5.Nicolae Postolachi, 4.Gheorghe Daraban, 3.Dumitru Mușat, 2.Mircea Munteanu, 1.Vasile Țurlea

7 December 1975

| Netherlands | 4 - 4 | Spain |

Amsterdam

20 December 1975

| Spain | 6 - 19 | Italy |

Estadio Nacional Complutense, Madrid

11 Jan 1976

| France XV | 71 - 6 | Netherlands |

Lille

7 February 1976

| Italy | 11 - 23 | France XV |

Milan

28 February 1976

| Spain | 0 - 36 | France XV |

Estadio Nacional Complutense, Madrid

26 March 1976

| Netherlands | 3 - 27 | Romania |

Sportpark Berestein, Hilversum

11 April 1976

| Poland | 12 - 3 | Netherlands |

Lublin

| 24 April 1976 | Italy | 13 - 12 | Romania | Stadio Tardini, Parma |
| | Try: Marchetto; Pen: Ponzi 3 | | Try: Constantin; Con: Bucos; Pen: Bucos; Drop: Bucos | Referee: Alan Hosie (Scotland) |
| Italy: 15.Rocco Caligiuri, 14.Manrico Marchetto, 13.Fiorenzo Blessano, 12.Fabrizio Gaetaniello, 11.Elio de Anna, 10.Ennio Ponzi, 9.Angelo Visentin, 8.Salvatore Bonetti (cap.), 7.Paolo Mariani, 6.Franco Baraldi, 5.Ivo Mazzucchelli, 4.Isidoro Quaglio, 3.Ambrogio Bona, 2.Paolo Paoletti, 1.Anacleto Altigieri - replacements: 16.Pierluigi Camiscioni | | | | Referee: Alan Hosie (Scotland) |
Romania: 15.Ion Simion, 14.Ion Constantin, 13.Gheorghe Nica, 12.Vasile Varga, 11.Petre Motrescu, 10.Mihai Bucos, 9.Mircea Paraschiv, 8.Mircea Munteanu, 7.Gheorghe Dumitru, 6.Gheorghe Daraban, 5.Nicolae Postolachi, 4.G. Malancu, 3.Nicolae Cioarec, 2.Mircea Ortelecan, 1.Constantin Dinu

2 May 1976

| Romania | 16 - 7 | Spain |

Stadionul Parcul Copilului, Bucharest

| 15 May 1976 | Poland | 17 - 14 | Spain | Bialsytok |
Spain: 15.José Luis Ruiz Cristín, 14.Alfonso Feijoo, 13.Salvador Torres, 12.Ramiro Moreno, 11.Carlos Reguero, 10.Hilario Bonavida, 9.Santiago Noriega, 8.José Maria Epalza (cap.), 7.Luis Menendez Menendez, 6.Manuel Coloma, 5.Ignacio Álvarez Cienfuego, 4.Gabriel Zapiain, 3.Jaime Usabiaga, 2. Joaquín Uría, 1.Luis Mocoroa; Replacements: Javier Olaciregui

4 April 1976

| Poland | 18 – 34 | France XV |

Krakow

== Second Division ==
- Table

| Place | Nation | Games | | | | Points | | | Table points |
| Place | Nation | played | won | drawn | lost | for | against | difference | Table points |
|---|---|---|---|---|---|---|---|---|---|
| 1 | Morocco | 2 | 2 | 0 | 0 | 52 | 10 | +42 | 6 |
| 2 | West Germany | 2 | 1 | 0 | 1 | 46 | 33 | +13 | 4 |
| 3 | Belgium | 2 | 0 | 0 | 2 | 10 | 65 | -55 | 2 |

Morocco promoted to Division 1 (more points scored than the winner of Pool 2)

- Results

26 October 1975

| West Germany | 43 - 3 | Belgium |

Hanover

8 November 1975

| Belgium | 7 - 22 | Morocco |

Brussels

28 March 1976

| Morocco | 30 - 3 | West Germany |

Casablanca

=== Pool 2 ===
- Table

| Place | Nation | Games | | | | Points | | | Table points |
| Place | Nation | played | won | drawn | lost | for | against | difference | Table points |
|---|---|---|---|---|---|---|---|---|---|
| 1 | Czechoslovakia | 2 | 2 | 0 | 0 | 51 | 9 | +42 | 6 |
| 2 | Yugoslavia | 2 | 1 | 0 | 1 | 34 | 32 | +2 | 4 |
| 3 | Switzerland | 2 | 0 | 0 | 2 | 10 | 54 | -44 | 2 |

- Results

26 October 1975

| Czechoslovakia | 28 - 3 | Yugoslavia |

Gottwaldov

16 November 1975

| Switzerland | 6 - 23 | Czechoslovakia |

Lausanne

25 April 1976

| Yugoslavia | 31 - 4 | Switzerland |

Split

== Bibliography ==
- (in Italian) Francesco Volpe, Valerio Vecchiarelli (2000), 2000 Italia in Meta, Storia della nazionale italiana di rugby dagli albori al Sei Nazioni, GS Editore (2000) ISBN 88-87374-40-6.
- (in Italian) Francesco Volpe, Paolo Pacitti (Author), Rugby 2000, GTE Gruppo Editorale (1999).
