= 1952 Rugby Union European Cup =

European rugby union championship

1952 Rugby Europe Cup
- Date: 2 March - 17 May 1952
- Countries: Spain; Belgium; West Germany; France; Italy

Tournament statistics
- Champions: France
- Matches played: 4

The Europe Cup 1952 was the fourth Rugby Union European championship, organized by FIRA.

After the Second World War rugby activity restarted in Europe with the Five Nations restarting in 1947. The FIRA approved to reorganize the European Championship, after three tournaments in 1936–38. During the assembly of May 20, 1951, it was decided that the name of tournament would be Europe Cup, and that the first edition was to be played in 1952. Like in all subsequent editions, only countries of Continental Europe ever took place.

A "challenge" format was chosen: France, winner of the last tournament in 1938, advanced directly to the final, where it met the winner of the preliminary tournament, which was played by four teams: Belgium, West Germany, Italy and Spain.

== Results ==
Point system: try 3 pt, conversion: 2 pt., penalty kick 3 pt. drop 3 pt, goal from mark 3 pt.
Click "show" for more info about match (scorers, line-up etc)

=== Preliminary tournament ===
- Semifinals

2 March 1952

| West Germany | 16 - 9 | Belgium |

Hanover

| 13 April 1952 | Spain | 0 - 6 | Italy | Montjuic, Barcelona |
| | | | Try: Gerosa 62'; Pen: Cecchetto 46' | Referee: Barbe (France) |

- Finals

| 27 April 1952 | Italy | 14 - 6 | West Germany | Stadio Tre Pini, Padua |
| | Try: Gerosa 21' 78' Masci 39'; Rosi 76'; Con: Cecchetto 39' | | Pen: Ritter 31'; Drop: W.Schumann 74' | Referee: Taddei (France) |

=== Great Final ===
| 17 May 1952 | Italy | 8 - 17 | France | Arena, Milan |
| | Try: Perducani 36’ Con: Turcato 36’ Pen: Cecchetto-Milani 42’ | | Try: Rogé 8’ Biénès 75’ Basquet 77’ Con: Prat 50’ 72’ | Attendance: 5,000; Referee: Priest (England) |
| Italy: 15.Silvano Tartaglini (cap), 14.Pietro Stievano, 13.Paolo Rosi, 12.Emilio Andina, 11.Enzo Gerosa, 10.Riccardo Santopadre, 9.Aldo Cecchetto-Milani, 8.Mario Percudani, 7.Gianni Aiolfi, 6.Primo Masci, 5.Leonardo Riccioni, 4.Paolo Dari, 3.Giorgio Fornari, 2.Gennaro Mancini, 1.Luciano Turcato | | | | Attendance: 5,000; Referee: Priest (England) |
France : 15.Pierre Guilleux, 14.Georges Brun, 13.Roger Martine, 12.Jacques Mauran, 11.Lucien Roge, 10.Michel Lecointre, 9.Paul Lasaosa, 8.Guy Basquet (cap), 7.Jean-Roger Bourdeu, 6.Jean Prat, 5.Bernard Chevallier, 4.Lucien Mias, 3.André Sanac, 2.Paul Labadie, 1.René Biénès

== Bibliography ==
- (in Italian) Francesco Volpe, Valerio Vecchiarelli (2000), 2000 Italia in Meta, Storia della nazionale italiana di rugby dagli albori al Sei Nazioni, GS Editore (2000) ISBN 88-87374-40-6
- (in Italian) Francesco Volpe, Paolo Pacitti (Author), Rugby 2000, GTE Gruppo Editorale (1999).
