= 1969–70 FIRA Nations Cup =

European rugby union championship

1969–70 Nations Cup
- Date: 9 November 1969 - 25 October 1970
- Countries: Czechoslovakia; France; Italy; Romania

Tournament statistics
- Champions: France
- Matches played: 6

The Nations Cup 1969–70 was the tenth edition of a European rugby union championship for national teams, and fifth with the formula and the name of "Nations Cup".

The tournament was won by France.

== First division ==
- Table

Place	Nation	Games				Points			Table points
Place	Nation	played	won	drawn	lost	for	against	difference	Table points
1	France	3	3	0	0	89	23	66	9
2	Romania	3	2	0	1	65	23	42	7
3	Italy	3	1	0	2	22	39	-17	5
4	Czechoslovakia	3	0	0	3	15	106	-91	3

Czechoslovakia relegated to division 2

- Results

Point system: try 3 pt, conversion: 2 pt., penalty kick 3 pt. drop 3 pt, goal from mark 3 pt.
Click "show" for more info about match (scorers, line-up etc)

9 November 1969	Italy	8 - 22	France B	Catania
	Try: U. Conforto; Con: Pacifici; Pen: Michelon		Try: Mellet 2, Bertranne, Pug; Con: Boursault 2 Pen: Boursault; Drop: Boursault	Referee: Jones (Wales)
Italy: 15. Angelo Autore (27' Rocco Caligiuri), 14. Elio Michelon, 13. Claudio Della Valle, 12. Walter Rista (63' Maurizio Finocchi), 11. Pierluigi Pacifici, 10. Giampiero Ricci, 9.Umberto Conforto, 8.Marco Bollesan (c), 7.Franco Valier, 6.Lucio Boccaletto, 5.Ivo Mazzucchelli, 4.Luigi Bettella, 3.Dominico Armellin, 2.Giancarlo Delli Ficorilli, 1.Massimo Gini				Referee: Jones (Wales)
France: 15. Marot, 14. Jansens 13. Puig (63' Jharassary) 12. Bertranne, 11. Mellet, 10. Boursault, 9. Dupuy, 8. Combeuil, 7.Cristina, 6.Joffre, 5.Forel, 4.Vignaud, 3.Rougerie, 2.Swiercinsky 1. Verdler

23 November 1969	Romania	42 - 6	Czechoslovakia	Stadionul Dinamo, Bucharest
				Referee: Filiatre (France)

14 December 1969	France	14 - 9	Romania	Stade Maurice Trélut, Tarbes
	Try: Dauga; Con: Dehez; Pen: Dehez 2 Drop: Dehez		Pen: Irimescu 2 Drop: Irimescu	Referee: R.F. Johnson (England)
France: 15. Pierre Villepreux, 14. Roger Bourgarel, 13. Alain Marot, 12. Jean Trillo, 11. Jean-Marie Bonal, 10. Jean-Louis Dehez, 9.Marcel Puget (cap), 8.Benoit Dauga, 7.Pierre Darbos, 6.Michel Yachvili, 5.Michel Savitsky, 4.Jean-Pierre Bastiat, 3.Jean Iracabal, 2.Rene Benesis, 1.Jean-Louis Azarete				Referee: R.F. Johnson (England)
Romania: 15. Victor Marinescu, 14.M. Wusek, 13. Valeriu Irimescu, 12. Gheorghie Dragomirescu-Rahtopol, 11. Gheorghie Nica, 10. Mihai Nicolescu, 9.Petre Florescu, 8.Radu Demian (cap), 7.Gheorgie Rascanu, 6.Paul Ciobanel, 5.Ion Tutuianu, 4.Constantin Serban, 3.Constantin Dinu, 2.V. Onutiu, 1.Nicolae Baciu

26 April 1970	Czechoslovakia	3 - 11	Italy	Krc, Prague
				Referee: P. Lebecq (France)
Czechoslovakia: 15. Blachut, 14. Hora, 13. Hevera, 12. Vrzal, 11. Kopec, 10. Kourek, 9.Sendler, 8.Krutzner, 7.Mazal, 6. Stransky, 5. Narka, 4.Partl, 3. Skall, 2.Horacek, 1.Matejca				Referee: P. Lebecq (France)
Italy 15. Luciano Modonesi, 14. Elio Michelon, 13. Lelio Lazzarini, 12. Maurizio Finocchi, 11. Pierluigi Pacifici, 10. Gianmatteo Cecchin, 9.Umberto Conforto, 8.Marco Bollesan, 7.Franco Valier, 6.Franco Cioni, 5.Guido Porzio, 4.Lucio Boccaletto, 3.Corrado Possamai, 2.Adolfo Gerardo, 1.Massimo Gini

3 May 1970

Czechoslovakia	6 - 53	France B

Prague

25 October 1970	Italy	3 - 14	Romania	Stadio Battaglini, Rovigo
	Try: Bollesan		Try: Irimescu, Nica; Con: Irimescu; Drop: Irimescu, Nica	Referee: Austry (France)
Italy 15. Luciano Modonesi, 14. Vittorio Ambron, 13. Aldo Caluzzi, 12. Maurizio Finocchi, 11. Pierluigi Pacifici (45' Elio Michelon), 10. Gianmatteo Cecchin, 9.Angelo Visentin, 8.Marco Bollesan (cap), 7.Franco Valier, 6.Franco Cioni (64' Lucio Boccaletto) 5.Luigi Bernabo, 4.Isidoro Quaglio, 3.Ettore Abbiati, 2.Pietro Monfeli, 1.Massimo Gini				Referee: Austry (France)
Romania : 15. Radu Durbac, 14. Mihai Suciu, 13. Gheorghie Dragomirescu-Rahtopol, 12. Gheorghie Nica, 11.M. Braga, 10. Valeriu Irimescu, 9.Adrian Mateescu, 8.Ion Tutuianu, 7.Alexandru Pop, 6.Gheorgie Rascanu, 5.Constantin Serban, 4.Alexandru Atanasiu, 3.Nicolae Baciu, 2.Valeriu Iorgulescu, 1.Constantin Dinu

== Second ==
=== Pool 1 ===
- Table

Place	Nation	Games				Points			Table points
Place	Nation	played	won	drawn	lost	for	against	difference	Table points
1	Spain	2	2	0	0	22	9	+13	6
2	Yugoslavia	2	1	0	1	15	23	-8	4
3	Poland	2	0	0	2	15	20	-5	2

- Results

Point system: try 3 pt, conversion: 2 pt., penalty kick 3 pt. drop 3 pt, goal from mark 3 pt.

21 December 1969

Spain	14 - 3	Yugoslavia

Madrid

5 April 1970

Yugoslavia	12 - 9	Poland

Palanka

26 April 1970

Poland	6 - 8	Spain

Poznań

=== Pool 2 ===
- Table

Place	Nation	Games				Points			Table points
Place	Nation	played	won	drawn	lost	for	against	difference	Table points
1	Morocco	2	2	0	0	32	16	16	6
2	Portugal	2	0	1	1	17	18	-1	3
3	Netherlands	2	0	1	1	17	32	-15	3

- Results

Point system: try 3 pt, conversion: 2 pt., penalty kick 3 pt. drop 3 pt, goal from mark 3 pt.

Morocco	23 - 8	Netherlands

Casablanca

5 April 1970

Netherlands	9 - 9	Portugal

Sportpark Berestein, Hilversum

12 April 1970

Portugal	8 - 9	Morocco

Barreiro

=== Final ===
- Results

Point system: try 3 pt, conversion: 2 pt., penalty kick 3 pt. drop 3 pt, goal from mark 3 pt

10 May 1970

Morocco	11 - 8	Spain

Casablanca

== Bibliography ==
- (in Italian) Francesco Volpe, Valerio Vecchiarelli (2000), 2000 Italia in Meta, Storia della nazionale italiana di rugby dagli albori al Sei Nazioni, GS Editore (2000) ISBN 88-87374-40-6
- (in Italian) Francesco Volpe, Paolo Pacitti (Author), Rugby 2000, GTE Gruppo Editorale (1999).
