= René Bénésis =

French rugby union player (born 1944)

- Born: 29 August 1944 (age 82) Orthez, France
- Height: 5 ft 7 in (170 cm)
- Weight: 181 lb (82 kg)

Rugby union career
- Position: Hooker
International career
Years	Team	Apps	(Points)
1969–1974	France	30	(0)

René Bénésis (born 29 August 1944) is a French former international rugby union player.

Born in Orthez, Bénésis was a hooker for France between 1969 and 1974, He toured Australia in 1972 and featured in France's 1973 win over New Zealand at the Parc des Princes. His early international appearances came while with RC Narbonne, before he moved on to SU Agen, where he won a Brennus Shield in 1976.

Bénésis helped coach SU Agen to another French Championship in 1982, then during the early 1990s had coaching stints at both US Dax and RC Narbonne. He has since retired to Languedoc.

== See also ==
- List of France national rugby union players
