= 1937 FIRA Tournament =

European rugby union championship

- Date: 10–17 October 1937
- Countries: Germany; France; Romania; Italy; Netherlands; Belgium

Tournament statistics
- Champions: France
- Matches played: 7

The 1937 FIRA Tournament was the second Rugby Union European championship, organized by the recently formed FIRA. It was played in Paris during the Exposition Internationale des Arts et Techniques dans la Vie Moderne.

== Preliminary round ==
Point system: try 3 pt, conversion: 2 pt., penalty kick 3 pt. drop 4 pt, goal from mark 3 pt.
Click "show" for more info about match (scorers, line-up etc)

10 October 1937

Romania	42 - 5	Netherlands

Charlety, Paris

10 October 1937	Italy	45 - 0	Belgium	Charlety, Paris
	Try: Cova 4, d’Alessio 2 Vigliano 2, G. Visentin; Re Garbagnati; Con: Vigliano 3, G. Visentin 3 Pen: Vigliano			Attendance: Coinderoux (France)

== Semifinals ==
14 October 1937	Italy	9 - 7	Germany	Charlety, Paris
	Try: G. Visentin, F.Vinci; Pen: Vigliano		Try: Fisher; Drop: Dunhaupt	Referee: Faur (France)

14 October 1937

France	27-11	Romania

Parc des princes, Paris

== 5th place final ==
15 October 1937

Belgium	20 - 3	Netherlands

Charlety, Paris

== 3rd place final ==
16 October 1937

Romania	3 - 30	Germany

Charlety, Paris

== Final ==
17 October 1937	France	43-5	Italy	Parc des Princes, Paris
	Try: Clehay 5’ 38’ 54’ 57’, Milliand 15’ Goyard 59’ J. Desclaux 71’ Delque 75’ 80’ Con: Thiers 5’ 54’, J. Desclax 38’ 57’ 71’ 75’ Drop: Bonnes 21’		Try: G.Visentin 33’	Attendance: 15,000; Referee: Roca (France)
France: Michel Bonnus, Pierre Milliand, Felix Bergese, Marcel Deygas, Maurice Celhay, Joseph Desclaux (cap), Pierre Thiers, Lucien Cognet, Francois Lombard, Francois Raynal, Emile Fabre, Antonin Delque, Pierre Daulouede, Edouard Ainciart, Andre Goyard				Attendance: 15,000; Referee: Roca (France)
