= Jean-Louis Azarete =

France international rugby union player (1945–2020)

- Born: 8 May 1945 Urrugne, France
- Died: 20 December 2020 (aged 75) Bayonne, France
- Height: 5 ft 11 in (180 cm)
- Weight: 229 lb (104 kg)

Rugby union career
- Position: Prop
International career
Years	Team	Apps	(Points)
1969–1975	France	26	(0)

Jean-Louis Azarete (8 May 1945 – 20 December 2020) was a French international rugby union player.

== Biography ==
Azarete was born on 8 May 1945, in Urrugne, and played his junior rugby union for St-Jean-de-Luz Olympique. During military service at the Joinville Battalion, Azarete transferred to US Dax and featured in their 1969 Challenge Yves du Manoir title win.

A sheep farmer by profession, Azarete was capped 26 times as a prop for France, debuting in the 1969 Five Nations. He was capped twice on France's 1971 tour South Africa and appeared in their 14–14 draw against the Wallabies at the SCG the following year. In 1973, Azarete was in the French front row for a win over the All Blacks at the Parc des Princes.

Azarete was decorated with the Ordre national du Mérite.

== See also ==
- List of France national rugby union players
