= 1938 FIRA Tournament =

European rugby union championship

- Date: 15-22 May 1938
- Countries: Germany; France; Romania

Tournament statistics
- Champions: France
- Matches played: 3

The 1938 FIRA Tournament was the third Rugby Union European championship, organized by the recently formed FIRA. It was played in Bucharest.

Only three teams participated.

== Results ==
Point system: try 3 pt, conversion: 2 pt., penalty kick 3 pt. drop 4 pt, goal from mark 3 pt.
Click "show" for more info about match (scorers, line-up etc)

15 May 1938	Romania	8 - 11	France	Bucharest
	Try: Andriesi; Con: Irimia; Pen: Irimia		Try: Blond, Caunegre; Le Goff; Con: Desclaux	Referee: H Schwanenberg (Germany)
Romania: Toma Moldoveanu, Ascanio Damian, Ion Andriesi, Nic Crissoveloni (cap.), Constantin Dinescu, Ioan Popa, Constantin Turut, Vasile Niculescu, Gheorghe Ionescu, Ion Irimia, Simion Burlescu, Gheorghie Crivat, Marin Slobozeanu, Constantin, Stefan Barsan				Referee: H Schwanenberg (Germany)
France: Michel Bonnus, Robert Caunegre, Andre Rapin, Felix Bergese, Raymond le Goff, Joseph Desclaux (cap.), Guy Vassal, Louis Dupont, Rene Arotca, Jean Blond, Rene Lombarteix, Antonin Delque, Emile Doussau, Jean Clave, Andre Goyard

18 May 1938

Romania	5–8	Germany

Bucharest

22 May 1938

France	8–5	Germany

Bucharest

== Table ==
Place	Nation	Games				Points			Table points
Place	Nation	played	won	drawn	lost	for	against	difference	Table points
1	France	2	2	0	0	19	13	+6	4
2	Germany	2	1	0	1	13	13	0	2
3	Romania	2	0	0	2	13	19	−6	0

== Bibliography ==
- (in Italian) Francesco Volpe, Valerio Vecchiarelli (2000), 2000 Italia in Meta, Storia della nazionale italiana di rugby dagli albori al Sei Nazioni, GS Editore (2000) ISBN 88-87374-40-6
- (in Italian) Francesco Volpe, Paolo Pacitti (Author), Rugby 2000, GTE Gruppo Editorale (1999).
