= Czechoslovakia national rugby union team =

Czechoslovakia
- Union: Czechoslovak Rugby Union

First international
- Czechoslovakia 6 – 23 Romania (Bratislava, Slovakia; 22 May 1927); Germany 38 – 0 Czechoslovakia (Leipzig, Germany; 9 November 1931)

Largest win
- Czechoslovakia 56 – 4 East Germany (Varna, Bulgaria; 18 September 1974)

Largest defeat
- Romania 60 – 6 Czechoslovakia (Bucharest, Romania; 9 April 1978)

The Czechoslovakia national rugby union team was the national rugby team of Czechoslovakia, before the country was split into the Czech Republic and Slovakia. They participated in qualifiers for the 1991 Rugby World Cup, but did not qualify.

== History ==
A Czechoslovak international team including players from an Austrian club called Wiener Amateure as well as players from the Slavia Bratislava club first played against Romania in 1927, but the match is seen as unofficial, since the Czechoslovak Rugby Union was only formed in 1928. They were captained by one František Ruber, who incidentally was a very good friend of Ondřej Sekora. Their first official match was against Germany in Leipzig in 1931.

In 1934 they were among the founding members of FIRA (as it was then known) along with France, Italy, Spain, Catalonia, Romania and Germany.

In 1956 they took on France in Toulouse, losing by a respectable 3–28, which is considered remarkable, as rugby in Czechoslovakia was considerably ravaged by World War II.

Some of their most notable players were Zdeněk Barchánek, Eduard Krützner, who was president of the Czech Rugby Union later on and Bruno Kudrna, Czech Rugby Player of the Year a record six times.

== Record ==
Below is a table of the representative rugby matches played by a Czechoslovakia national XV at test level up until 15 November 1992, updated after match with Netherlands.

Opponent	Played	Won	Lost	Drawn	% Won
Belgium	7	6	1	0	85.71%
Bulgaria	7	6	1	0	85.71%
East Germany	16	12	2	2	75%
France	2	0	2	0	0%
France A	7	0	7	0	0%
Germany	2	0	2	0	0%
Italy	11	1	9	1	9.09%
Italy A	2	0	2	0	0%
Morocco	5	3	2	0	60%
Netherlands	7	5	2	0	71.43%
Poland	22	10	11	1	45.45%
Portugal	2	0	2	0	0%
Romania	17	0	16	1	0%
Romania A	5	1	4	0	20%
Soviet Union	7	2	5	0	28.57%
Spain	5	2	2	1	40%
Sweden	6	6	0	0	100%
Switzerland	2	2	0	0	100%
Tunisia	4	2	2	0	50%
Yugoslavia	8	7	1	0	87.5%
West Germany	13	9	2	1	69.23%
West Germany A	1	1	0	0	100%
Total	157	75	74	7	47.77%

== See also ==
- Czech Republic
  - Rugby union in the Czech Republic
  - Czech Republic national rugby union team
  - Czech Republic women's national rugby union team
  - Czech Republic national rugby union team (sevens)
  - Czech Rugby Union
- Slovakia
  - Rugby union in Slovakia
  - Slovakia national rugby union team
