= List of Georgia national rugby union players =

List of Georgia national rugby union players is a list of people who have played for the Georgia national rugby union team. The list only includes players who have played in a match recognized by the Georgian Rugby Union as a test match, whether it was played before or after the governing body was independently established in 1991. (In rugby union, any match of a nation's senior side recognized as a test by its national governing body is included in test statistics for that nation.) Players that were first capped during the same match are listed in order of those that began in the starting line up before replacements and then in alphabetical order by surname. Note that the "position" column lists the position at which the player made his test debut and not necessarily the position for which he is best known. A position in parentheses indicates that the player debuted as a substitute.

As of March 2019, no members of the national rugby union team have been inducted into the World Rugby Hall of Fame.

== List ==
No.	Name	Position	Date of debut	Opposition	Competition	Venue	Ref.
1	Zaza Bakuradze	Prop	Sep 12, 1989	Zimbabwe	Test match	Kutaisi	
2	David Dzagnidze	Fly-half	Sep 12, 1989	Zimbabwe	Test match	Kutaisi	
3	Davit Ghudushauri	No. 8	Sep 12, 1989	Zimbabwe	Test match	Kutaisi	
4	Giorgi Guiunashvili	Flanker	Sep 12, 1989	Zimbabwe	Test match	Kutaisi	
5	Alex Isakadze	Lock	Sep 12, 1989	Zimbabwe	Test match	Kutaisi	
6	Barthlome Khamashuridze	Wing	Sep 12, 1989	Zimbabwe	Test match	Kutaisi	
7	Nurbi-Tamaz Khuade	Lock	Sep 12, 1989	Zimbabwe	Test match	Kutaisi	
8	Alexander Khvedelidze	Wing	Sep 12, 1989	Zimbabwe	Test match	Kutaisi	
9	Beso Liluashvili	Prop	Sep 12, 1989	Zimbabwe	Test match	Kutaisi	
10	Oleg Liparteliani	Center	Sep 12, 1989	Zimbabwe	Test match	Kutaisi	
11	Mamuka Losaberidze	Scrum-half	Sep 12, 1989	Zimbabwe	Test match	Kutaisi	
12	Tamaz Pkhakadze	Flanker	Sep 12, 1989	Zimbabwe	Test match	Kutaisi	
13	Vano Satseradze	Fullback	Sep 12, 1989	Zimbabwe	Test match	Kutaisi	
14	Malkhaz Tcheishvili	Wing	Sep 12, 1989	Zimbabwe	Test match	Kutaisi	
15	Tenguiz Turdzeladze	Hooker	Sep 12, 1989	Zimbabwe	Test match	Kutaisi	
16	Kakha Machitidze	(Scrum-half)	Sep 12, 1989	Zimbabwe	Test match	Kutaisi	
17	Tamaz Odisharia	(Lock)	Sep 12, 1989	Zimbabwe	Test match	Kutaisi	
18	Guela Pirtskhalava	(Prop)	Sep 12, 1989	Zimbabwe	Test match	Kutaisi	
19	Emzar Gueguchadze	Center	Apr 14, 1990	Zimbabwe	Test match	Hartsfield; Bulawayo	
20	Kakha Guiunashvili	Prop	Apr 14, 1990	Zimbabwe	Test match	Hartsfield; Bulawayo	
21	Merab Marjanishvili	Wing	Apr 14, 1990	Zimbabwe	Test match	Hartsfield; Bulawayo	
22	Sasha Natchqebia	Lock	Apr 14, 1990	Zimbabwe	Test match	Hartsfield; Bulawayo	
23	Badri Shvanguiradze	Flanker	Apr 14, 1990	Zimbabwe	Test match	Hartsfield; Bulawayo	
24	Davit Chavleishvili	(Fullback)	Apr 14, 1990	Zimbabwe	Test match	Hartsfield; Bulawayo	
25	Gia Rapava	Lock	Apr 21, 1990	Zimbabwe	Test match	Police Grounds; Harare	
26	Merab Besselia	Center	Nov 21, 1991	Ukraine	Test match	Mikheil Meskhi Stadium; Tbilisi	
27	Mamuka Gagnidze	Lock	Nov 21, 1991	Ukraine	Test match	Mikheil Meskhi Stadium; Tbilisi	
28	Igor Kerauli	Scrum-half	Nov 21, 1991	Ukraine	Test match	Mikheil Meskhi Stadium; Tbilisi	
29	Michael Kharshiladze	Fullback	Nov 21, 1991	Ukraine	Test match	Mikheil Meskhi Stadium; Tbilisi	
30	Guia Peradze	Flanker	Nov 21, 1991	Ukraine	Test match	Mikheil Meskhi Stadium; Tbilisi	
31	Tenguiz Tavadze	Wing	Nov 21, 1991	Ukraine	Test match	Mikheil Meskhi Stadium; Tbilisi	
32	Davit Vartaniani	Flanker	Nov 21, 1991	Ukraine	Test match	Mikheil Meskhi Stadium; Tbilisi	
33	Lasha Vashadze	Wing	Nov 21, 1991	Ukraine	Test match	Mikheil Meskhi Stadium; Tbilisi	
34	Shavleg Janelidze	(Center)	Nov 21, 1991	Ukraine	Test match	Mikheil Meskhi Stadium; Tbilisi	
35	Irakli Lezhava	(Scrum-half)	Nov 21, 1991	Ukraine	Test match	Mikheil Meskhi Stadium; Tbilisi	
36	Victor Didebulidze	Lock	Nov 24, 1991	Ukraine	Test match	Rustavi	
37	Spiridon Liparteliani	Wing	Nov 24, 1991	Ukraine	Test match	Rustavi	
38	Niko Iurini	(Scrum-half)	Nov 24, 1991	Ukraine	Test match	Rustavi	
39	Zaza Lezhava	(Lock)	Nov 24, 1991	Ukraine	Test match	Rustavi	
40	Mevlud Mtiulishvili	(Prop)	Nov 24, 1991	Ukraine	Test match	Rustavi	
41	Guga Babunashvili	Prop	Jul 13, 1992	Ukraine	Test match	Kyiv	
42	Emzar Dzagnidze	Wing	Jul 13, 1992	Ukraine	Test match	Kyiv	
43	Aleko Ghibradze	Lock	Jul 13, 1992	Ukraine	Test match	Kyiv	
44	Revaz Japarashvili	Flanker	Jul 13, 1992	Ukraine	Test match	Kyiv	
45	Niko Natroshvili	Scrum-half	Jul 13, 1992	Ukraine	Test match	Kyiv	
46	Paata Svanidze	Hooker	Jul 13, 1992	Ukraine	Test match	Kyiv	
47	Demir Dzneladze	(Wing)	Jul 13, 1992	Ukraine	Test match	Kyiv	
48	Levan Mgueladze	(Utility back)	Jul 13, 1992	Ukraine	Test match	Kyiv	
49	Giorgi Beriashvili	Hooker	May 25, 1993	Russia	1995 Rugby World Cup Qualifier	Sopot	
50	Kote Jintcharadze	Prop	May 25, 1993	Russia	1995 Rugby World Cup Qualifier	Sopot	
51	Dimitri Oboladze	Flanker	May 25, 1993	Russia	1995 Rugby World Cup Qualifier	Sopot	
52	Davit Iobidze	(Scrum-half)	May 25, 1993	Russia	1995 Rugby World Cup Qualifier	Sopot	
53	Irakli Chikava	Prop	May 27, 1993	Poland	1995 Rugby World Cup Qualifier	Sopot	
54	Kakha Alania	Center	Oct 31, 1993	Luxembourg	1992–94 FIRA Trophy, Third Division	Stade Josy Barthel; Luxembourg City	
55	Elguja Iovadze	Fly-half	Oct 31, 1993	Luxembourg	1992–94 FIRA Trophy, Third Division	Stade Josy Barthel; Luxembourg City	
56	Zaza Khutsishvili	Scrum-half	Oct 31, 1993	Luxembourg	1992–94 FIRA Trophy, Third Division	Stade Josy Barthel; Luxembourg City	
57	Akaki Matchutadze	Prop	Oct 31, 1993	Luxembourg	1992–94 FIRA Trophy, Third Division	Stade Josy Barthel; Luxembourg City	
58	Paata Tqabladze	Wing	Oct 31, 1993	Luxembourg	1992–94 FIRA Trophy, Third Division	Stade Josy Barthel; Luxembourg City	
59	Tikhon Khakhaleishvili	Prop	Apr 3, 1994	Kazakhstan	Test match	Gelendzhik	
60	Shota Modebadze	Fly-half	Apr 3, 1994	Kazakhstan	Test match	Gelendzhik	
61	Vano Nadiradze	Lock	Apr 3, 1994	Kazakhstan	Test match	Gelendzhik	
62	Soso Partsikanashvili	Lock	Apr 3, 1994	Kazakhstan	Test match	Gelendzhik	
63	Paata Saneblidze	Flanker	Apr 3, 1994	Kazakhstan	Test match	Gelendzhik	
64	Irakli Sikharulidze	Wing	Apr 3, 1994	Kazakhstan	Test match	Gelendzhik	
65	Levan Tsabadze	Hooker	Apr 3, 1994	Kazakhstan	Test match	Gelendzhik	
66	Mikheil Chachua	(Substitute)	Apr 3, 1994	Kazakhstan	Test match	Gelendzhik	
67	Zviad Liparteliani	(Flanker)	Apr 3, 1994	Kazakhstan	Test match	Gelendzhik	
68	Levan Chikvinidze	Center	Jun 4, 1994	Switzerland	1992–94 FIRA Trophy, Third Division	La Chaux-de-Fonds	
69	Archil Kavtarashvili	Wing	Jun 4, 1994	Switzerland	1992–94 FIRA Trophy, Third Division	La Chaux-de-Fonds	
70	Emzar Shanidze	Fullback	Jun 4, 1994	Switzerland	1992–94 FIRA Trophy, Third Division	La Chaux-de-Fonds	
71	Vakho Tskitishvili	Prop	Jun 4, 1994	Switzerland	1992–94 FIRA Trophy, Third Division	La Chaux-de-Fonds	
72	Paliko Jimsheladze	Wing	Mar 23, 1995	Bulgaria		Sofia	
73	Giorgi Kakhiani	Lock	Mar 23, 1995	Bulgaria		Sofia	
74	Nugzar Mgueladze	Wing	Mar 23, 1995	Bulgaria		Sofia	
75	Zurab Mtchedlishvili	(Lock)	Mar 25, 1995	Moldova		Sofia	
76	Paata Dzotsenidze	Wing	Oct 15, 1995	Germany	1995–97 FIRA Trophy, Second Division	Boris Paichadze National Stadium; Tbilisi	
77	Kakha Kobakhidze	(Flanker)	Oct 15, 1995	Germany	1995–97 FIRA Trophy, Second Division	Boris Paichadze National Stadium; Tbilisi	
78	Zurab Rekhviashvili	(Utility forward)	Nov 24, 1995	Netherlands	1995–97 FIRA Trophy, Second Division	Castricum	
79	Beso Tepnadze	(Fly-half)	Nov 24, 1995	Netherlands	1995–97 FIRA Trophy, Second Division	Castricum	
80	Akvsenti Giorgadze	(Hooker)	Apr 12, 1996	Czech Republic	1995–97 FIRA Trophy, Second Division	Mikheil Meskhi Stadium; Tbilisi	
81	Sandro Sakandelidze	(Center)	Apr 12, 1996	Czech Republic	1995–97 FIRA Trophy, Second Division	Mikheil Meskhi Stadium; Tbilisi	
82	Giorgi Buguianishvili	Wing	Sep 22, 1996	Czech Republic	1996–97 FIRA Tournament	Tatra Smíchov Rugby Club; Prague	
83	Gia Labadze	Flanker	Sep 22, 1996	Czech Republic	1996–97 FIRA Tournament	Tatra Smíchov Rugby Club; Prague	
84	Vasil Katsadze	Lock	May 10, 1997	Poland	1996–97 FIRA Tournament	Sopot	
85	Rati Urushadze	Flanker	May 10, 1997	Poland	1996–97 FIRA Tournament	Sopot	
86	Nono Andghuladze	(Center)	May 10, 1997	Poland	1996–97 FIRA Tournament	Sopot	
87	Sandro Chkhenkeli	(Center)	May 10, 1997	Poland	1996–97 FIRA Tournament	Sopot	
88	Nika Abdaladze	No. 8	Oct 12, 1997	Croatia	1999 Rugby World Cup Qualifier	Boris Paichadze National Stadium; Tbilisi	
89	Malkhaz Urjukashvili	Wing	Oct 12, 1997	Croatia	1999 Rugby World Cup Qualifier	Boris Paichadze National Stadium; Tbilisi	
90	Levan Javelidze	(Prop)	Oct 12, 1997	Croatia	1999 Rugby World Cup Qualifier	Boris Paichadze National Stadium; Tbilisi	
91	Archil Kobakhidze	(Flanker)	Oct 12, 1997	Croatia	1999 Rugby World Cup Qualifier	Boris Paichadze National Stadium; Tbilisi	
92	Ilia Maisuradze	(Fly-half)	Oct 12, 1997	Croatia	1999 Rugby World Cup Qualifier	Boris Paichadze National Stadium; Tbilisi	
93	Bessik Khamashuridze	Fullback	Apr 11, 1998	Italy A	1999 Rugby World Cup Qualifier	Stadio Tommaso Fattori; L'Aquila	
94	Vassil Abashidze	(Fullback)	Apr 11, 1998	Italy A	1999 Rugby World Cup Qualifier	Stadio Tommaso Fattori; L'Aquila	
95	Niko Tchavtchavadze	(Hooker)	Apr 11, 1998	Italy A	1999 Rugby World Cup Qualifier	Stadio Tommaso Fattori; L'Aquila	
96	Alexi Gusharashvili	Prop	May 3, 1998	Ukraine	Test match	Kyiv	
97	Davit Ashvetia	(Prop)	May 3, 1998	Ukraine	Test match	Kyiv	
98	Mamuka Magrakvelidze	(Prop)	May 3, 1998	Ukraine	Test match	Kyiv	
99	Soso Sultanishvili	(Prop)	May 3, 1998	Ukraine	Test match	Kyiv	
100	Davit Tskhvediani	(Flanker)	May 3, 1998	Ukraine	Test match	Kyiv	
101	Goderdzi Shvelidze	Prop	Nov 14, 1998	Ireland	1999 Rugby World Cup Qualifier	Lansdowne Road; Dublin	
102	Ilia Zedginidze	Lock	Nov 14, 1998	Ireland	1999 Rugby World Cup Qualifier	Lansdowne Road; Dublin	
103	Irakli Guiorkhelidze	Scrum-half	Nov 18, 1998	Romania	1999 Rugby World Cup Qualifier	Lansdowne Road; Dublin	
104	Badri Khekhelashvili	Wing	Mar 6, 1999	Tonga	1999 Rugby World Cup Repechage Qualifier	Teufaiva Sport Stadium; Nukuʻalofa	
105	Sandro Esakia	(Hooker)	Mar 6, 1999	Tonga	1999 Rugby World Cup Repechage Qualifier	Teufaiva Sport Stadium; Nukuʻalofa	
106	Soso Nikolaenko	(Prop)	Mar 6, 1999	Tonga	1999 Rugby World Cup Repechage Qualifier	Teufaiva Sport Stadium; Nukuʻalofa	
107	Irakli Abuseridze	Scrum-half	Jan 26, 2000	Italy XV	Test match	Carlo Montano Stadium; Livorno	
108	David Bolgashvili	Flanker	Jan 26, 2000	Italy XV	Test match	Carlo Montano Stadium; Livorno	
109	Sandro Mtchedlishvili	(Lock)	Jan 26, 2000	Italy XV	Test match	Carlo Montano Stadium; Livorno	
110	Tato Ratianidze	(Prop)	Jan 26, 2000	Italy XV	Test match	Carlo Montano Stadium; Livorno	
111	Tedo Zibzibadze	(Center)	Jan 26, 2000	Italy XV	Test match	Carlo Montano Stadium; Livorno	
112	Davit Baramidze	(Fly-half)	Mar 19, 2000	Netherlands	2000 European Nations Cup First Division	Boris Paichadze National Stadium; Tbilisi	
113	Grégoire Yachvili	Flanker	Feb 4, 2001	Netherlands	2001 European Nations Cup First Division	Amsterdam	
114	Besso Udessiani	(Back row)	Mar 18, 2001	Spain	2001 European Nations Cup First Division	Rustavi	
115	Irakli Giorgadze	(Center)	Nov 10, 2001	French Universities	Test match	Mikheil Meskhi Stadium; Tbilisi	
116	Shalva Papashvili	(Flanker)	Nov 18, 2001	South Africa A	Test match	Mikheil Meskhi Stadium; Tbilisi	
117	Giorgi Chkhaidze	Flanker	Feb 3, 2002	Netherlands	2001–02 European Nations Cup First Division	Boris Paichadze National Stadium; Tbilisi	
118	Irakli Machkhaneli	Wing	Feb 3, 2002	Netherlands	2001–02 European Nations Cup First Division	Boris Paichadze National Stadium; Tbilisi	
119	Otar Eloshvili	(Center)	Feb 3, 2002	Netherlands	2001–02 European Nations Cup First Division	Boris Paichadze National Stadium; Tbilisi	
120	Kakha Uchava	(Lock)	Mar 24, 2002	Spain	2001–02 European Nations Cup First Division	Campo Universitaria; Madrid	
121	Boba Kvinikhidze	(Fly-half)	Apr 6, 2002	Romania	2001–02 European Nations Cup First Division	Boris Paichadze National Stadium; Tbilisi	
122	Otar Barkalaia	(Fly-half)	Sep 28, 2002	Ireland	2003 Rugby World Cup Qualifier	Lansdowne Road; Dublin	
123	Irakli Gundishvili	(Flanker)	Sep 28, 2002	Ireland	2003 Rugby World Cup Qualifier	Lansdowne Road; Dublin	
124	Giorgi Elizbarashvili	(Wing)	Oct 13, 2002	Russia	2003 Rugby World Cup Qualifier	Boris Paichadze National Stadium; Tbilisi	
125	Merab Kvirikashvili	(Scrum-half)	Feb 16, 2003	Portugal	2003–04 European Nations Cup First Division	Estádio Universitário de Lisboa; Lisbon	
126	Zviad Matiashvili	Lock	Feb 22, 2003	Spain	2003–04 European Nations Cup First Division	Boris Paichadze National Stadium; Tbilisi	
127	Mamuka Gorgodze	(No. 8)	Feb 22, 2003	Spain	2003–04 European Nations Cup First Division	Boris Paichadze National Stadium; Tbilisi	
128	Davit Khinchagishvili	(Prop)	Feb 22, 2003	Spain	2003–04 European Nations Cup First Division	Boris Paichadze National Stadium; Tbilisi	
129	Avto Kopaliani	Prop	Sep 6, 2003	Italy	Test match	Asti	
130	Aleko Margvelashvili	Prop	Sep 6, 2003	Italy	Test match	Asti	
131	David Dadunashvili	(Prop)	Sep 6, 2003	Italy	Test match	Asti	
132	Gocha Khonelidze	(Wing)	Sep 6, 2003	Italy	Test match	Asti	
133	Davit Kiknadze	(Wing)	Sep 6, 2003	Italy	Test match	Asti	
134	Irakli Modebadze	(Scrum-half)	Sep 6, 2003	Italy	Test match	Asti	
135	Sergo Gujaraidze	Lock	Oct 24, 2003	South Africa	2003 Rugby World Cup	Sydney Football Stadium; Sydney	
136	Giorgi Tsiklauri	Flanker	Oct 24, 2003	South Africa	2003 Rugby World Cup	Sydney Football Stadium; Sydney	
137	Levan Ghvaberidze	Hooker	Feb 14, 2004	Portugal	2003–04 European Nations Cup First Division	Mikheil Meskhi Stadium; Tbilisi	
138	Zviad Maissuradze	Flanker	Feb 14, 2004	Portugal	2003–04 European Nations Cup First Division	Mikheil Meskhi Stadium; Tbilisi	
139	Bidzina Samkharadze	Scrum-half	Feb 14, 2004	Portugal	2003–04 European Nations Cup First Division	Mikheil Meskhi Stadium; Tbilisi	
140	Giorgi Kutarashvili	(Prop)	Feb 14, 2004	Portugal	2003–04 European Nations Cup First Division	Mikheil Meskhi Stadium; Tbilisi	
141	Michael Sujashvili	(Prop)	Feb 14, 2004	Portugal	2003–04 European Nations Cup First Division	Mikheil Meskhi Stadium; Tbilisi	
142	Davit Gasviani	Prop	Feb 22, 2004	Spain	2003–04 European Nations Cup First Division	Tarragona	
143	Lexo Gugava	Wing	Feb 22, 2004	Spain	2003–04 European Nations Cup First Division	Tarragona	
144	Rezo Belkania	(Hooker)	Feb 22, 2004	Spain	2003–04 European Nations Cup First Division	Tarragona	
145	Levan Datunashvili	(Lock)	Feb 22, 2004	Spain	2003–04 European Nations Cup First Division	Tarragona	
146	Lasha Pirpilahvili	(Centre)	Mar 6, 2004	Russia		Tbilisi	
147	Giorgi Shkinin	Wing	Mar 20, 2004	Czech Republic	2003–04 European Nations Cup First Division	Boris Paichadze National Stadium; Tbilisi	
148	Davit Jghenti	(Lock)	Mar 20, 2004	Czech Republic	2003–04 European Nations Cup First Division	Boris Paichadze National Stadium; Tbilisi	
149	Denis Pinchukovi	(Wing)	Mar 20, 2004	Czech Republic	2003–04 European Nations Cup First Division	Boris Paichadze National Stadium; Tbilisi	
150	Roin Chikvaidze	Flanker	Oct 30, 2004	Uruguay	2004 Intercontinental Cup	Estadio Luis Franzini; Montevideo	
151	Zviad Koberidze	Fullback	Oct 30, 2004	Uruguay	2004 Intercontinental Cup	Estadio Luis Franzini; Montevideo	
152	Irakli Ninidze	Prop	Oct 30, 2004	Uruguay	2004 Intercontinental Cup	Estadio Luis Franzini; Montevideo	
153	Davit Zirakashvili	Prop	Oct 30, 2004	Uruguay	2004 Intercontinental Cup	Estadio Luis Franzini; Montevideo	
154	Giorgi Jghenti	(Prop)	Oct 30, 2004	Uruguay	2004 Intercontinental Cup	Estadio Luis Franzini; Montevideo	
155	Archil Kopaleishvili	(Lock)	Oct 30, 2004	Uruguay	2004 Intercontinental Cup	Estadio Luis Franzini; Montevideo	
156	Giorgi Sanikidze	(Flanker)	Oct 30, 2004	Uruguay	2004 Intercontinental Cup	Estadio Luis Franzini; Montevideo	
157	Akaki Sanadze	Prop	Nov 6, 2004	Chile	2004 Intercontinental Cup	Prince of Wales Cricket Club; Santiago	
158	Beka Sardanashvili	Flanker	Nov 6, 2004	Chile	2004 Intercontinental Cup	Prince of Wales Cricket Club; Santiago	
159	Zaza Valishvili	No. 8	Nov 6, 2004	Chile	2004 Intercontinental Cup	Prince of Wales Cricket Club; Santiago	
160	Giorgi Kacharava	(Scrum-half)	Feb 26, 2005	Ukraine	2004–06 European Nations Cup First Division	Boris Paichadze National Stadium; Tbilisi	
161	Luka Khachirashvili	(Wing)	Feb 26, 2005	Ukraine	2004–06 European Nations Cup First Division	Boris Paichadze National Stadium; Tbilisi	
162	Temur Sokhadze	(Fullback)	Jun 12, 2005	Czech Republic	2004–06 European Nations Cup First Division	Kutaisi	
163	Davit Jhamutashvili	Center	Nov 12, 2005	Chile	2005 Intercontinental Cup	Boris Paichadze National Stadium; Tbilisi	
164	Giorgi Nemsadze	Lock	Nov 12, 2005	Chile	2005 Intercontinental Cup	Boris Paichadze National Stadium; Tbilisi	
165	Irakli Chkhikvadze	(Wing)	Nov 12, 2005	Chile	2005 Intercontinental Cup	Boris Paichadze National Stadium; Tbilisi	
166	Shalva Sutiashvili	(Back row)	Nov 12, 2005	Chile	2005 Intercontinental Cup	Boris Paichadze National Stadium; Tbilisi	
167	Revaz Gigauri	(Fullback)	Apr 29, 2006	Ukraine	2004–06 European Nations Cup First Division	Spartak Stadium; Odesa	
168	Davit Kacharava	(Center)	Apr 29, 2006	Ukraine	2004–06 European Nations Cup First Division	Spartak Stadium; Odesa	
169	Irakli Natriashvili	(Hooker)	Apr 29, 2006	Ukraine	2004–06 European Nations Cup First Division	Spartak Stadium; Odesa	
170	Davit Gurgenidze	(Fullback)	Mar 17, 2007	Spain	2006–08 European Nations Cup First Division	Campo Universitaria; Madrid	
171	Vakhtang Akhvlediani	(Substitute)	Apr 7, 2007	Czech Republic	2006–08 European Nations Cup First Division	Boris Paichadze National Stadium; Tbilisi	
172	Irakli Chkonia	Hooker	Jun 10, 2007	Emerging Springboks	2007 Nations Cup	Stadionul Arcul de Triumf; Bucharest	
173	Elizbar Kuparadze	Prop	Jun 10, 2007	Emerging Springboks	2007 Nations Cup	Stadionul Arcul de Triumf; Bucharest	
174	Dimitri Basilaia	No. 8	Feb 2, 2008	Portugal	2006–08 European Nations Cup First Division	Mikheil Meskhi Stadium; Tbilisi	
175	Irakli Kiasashvili	Fullback	Feb 2, 2008	Portugal	2006–08 European Nations Cup First Division	Mikheil Meskhi Stadium; Tbilisi	
176	Davit Kubriashvili	Prop	Feb 2, 2008	Portugal	2006–08 European Nations Cup First Division	Mikheil Meskhi Stadium; Tbilisi	
177	Lasha Malaghuradze	(Fly-half)	Feb 2, 2008	Portugal	2006–08 European Nations Cup First Division	Mikheil Meskhi Stadium; Tbilisi	
178	Anton Peikrishvili	(Prop)	Feb 2, 2008	Portugal	2006–08 European Nations Cup First Division	Mikheil Meskhi Stadium; Tbilisi	
179	Shota Melikidze	Prop	Mar 29, 2008	Czech Republic	2006–08 European Nations Cup First Division	Stadion Eden; Prague	
180	Alexander Todua	Center	Mar 29, 2008	Czech Republic	2006–08 European Nations Cup First Division	Stadion Eden; Prague	
181	Davit Chichua	(Flanker)	Mar 29, 2008	Czech Republic	2006–08 European Nations Cup First Division	Stadion Eden; Prague	
182	Simon Maisuradze	(Flanker)	Mar 29, 2008	Czech Republic	2006–08 European Nations Cup First Division	Stadion Eden; Prague	
183	Giorgi Mtchedlishvili	(Center)	Mar 29, 2008	Czech Republic	2006–08 European Nations Cup First Division	Stadion Eden; Prague	
184	Sandro Nijaradze	(Wing)	Mar 29, 2008	Czech Republic	2006–08 European Nations Cup First Division	Stadion Eden; Prague	
185	Bachuki Gujaraidze	Lock	Jun 11, 2008	Emerging Springboks	2008 Nations Cup	Stadionul Arcul de Triumf; Bucharest	
186	Jaba Bregvadze	(Hooker)	Jun 11, 2008	Emerging Springboks	2008 Nations Cup	Stadionul Arcul de Triumf; Bucharest	
187	Tornike Dzagnidze	(No. 8)	Jun 11, 2008	Emerging Springboks	2008 Nations Cup	Stadionul Arcul de Triumf; Bucharest	
188	Lasha Khmaladze	(Center)	Jun 11, 2008	Emerging Springboks	2008 Nations Cup	Stadionul Arcul de Triumf; Bucharest	
189	Giorgi Khositashvili	(Prop)	Jun 11, 2008	Emerging Springboks	2008 Nations Cup	Stadionul Arcul de Triumf; Bucharest	
190	Karlen Asieshvili	(Prop)	Jun 20, 2008	Italy A	2008 Nations Cup	Stadionul Arcul de Triumf; Bucharest	
191	Viktor Kolelishvili	(No. 8)	Jun 20, 2008	Italy A	2008 Nations Cup	Stadionul Arcul de Triumf; Bucharest	
192	Giorgi Rokhvadze	(Scrum-half)	Jun 20, 2008	Italy A	2008 Nations Cup	Stadionul Arcul de Triumf; Bucharest	
193	Beka Tsiklauri	(Fly-half)	Jun 20, 2008	Italy A	2008 Nations Cup	Stadionul Arcul de Triumf; Bucharest	
194	Guram Kavtidze	Prop	Nov 14, 2008	Scotland A	Test match	Firhill Stadium; Glasgow	
195	Vasil Kakovin	(Hooker)	Nov 14, 2008	Scotland A	Test match	Firhill Stadium; Glasgow	
196	Zero Petrashchvili	Prop	Jun 6, 2009	Canada	2009 Churchill Cup	Infinity Park; Glendale	
197	Giorgi Lomsadze	(Prop)	Jun 21, 2009	United States	2009 Churchill Cup	Dick's Sporting Goods Park; Commerce City	
198	Lasha Tavartkiladze	(Flanker)	Nov 20, 2009	Italy A	Test match	Palmanova	
199	Beka Sheklashvili		Jun 11, 2010	Scotland A		Bucharest	
200	Giga Korkelia		Jun 11, 2010	Scotland A		Bucharest	
201	Konstantin Mikautadze		Jun 11, 2010	Scotland A		Bucharest	
202	Mamuka Ninidze		Jun 11, 2010	Scotland A		Bucharest	
203	Shota Sakvarelidze		Jun 11, 2010	Scotland A		Bucharest	
204	Vakhtang Maisuradze	(Flanker)	Feb 5, 2011	Ukraine	2010–12 European Nations Cup First Division	Boris Paichadze National Stadium; Tbilisi	
205	Beka Urjukashvili	(Fullback)	Feb 5, 2011	Ukraine	2010–12 European Nations Cup First Division	Boris Paichadze National Stadium; Tbilisi	
206	Givi Berishvili	Flanker	Jun 10, 2011	South Africa Kings	2011 Nations Cup	Stadionul Arcul de Triumf; Bucharest	
207	Giorgi Jimsheladze	Center	Jun 10, 2011	South Africa Kings	2011 Nations Cup	Stadionul Arcul de Triumf; Bucharest	
208	Shalva Mamukashvili	(Hooker)	Jun 10, 2011	South Africa Kings	2011 Nations Cup	Stadionul Arcul de Triumf; Bucharest	
209	Giorgi Begadze	Scrum-half	Jun 15, 2011	Argentina XV	2011 Nations Cup	Stadionul Arcul de Triumf; Bucharest	
210	Mikheil Nariashvili	Prop	Feb 11, 2012	Spain	2010–12 European Nations Cup First Division	Campo Universitaria; Madrid	
211	Merab Sharikadze	Center	Feb 11, 2012	Spain	2010–12 European Nations Cup First Division	Campo Universitaria; Madrid	
212	Levan Chilachava	(Prop)	Feb 11, 2012	Spain	2010–12 European Nations Cup First Division	Campo Universitaria; Madrid	
213	Giorgi Kalmakhelidze	(No. 8)	Feb 11, 2012	Spain	2010–12 European Nations Cup First Division	Campo Universitaria; Madrid	
214	Irakli Mirtskhulava	Prop	Jun 9, 2012	Ukraine	2010–12 European Nations Cup First Division	Boris Paichadze National Stadium; Tbilisi	
215	Giorgi Tkhilaishvili	Flanker	Jun 9, 2012	Ukraine	2010–12 European Nations Cup First Division	Boris Paichadze National Stadium; Tbilisi	
216	Beka Bitsadze	(Lock)	Jun 9, 2012	Ukraine	2010–12 European Nations Cup First Division	Boris Paichadze National Stadium; Tbilisi	
217	Tamaz Mchedlidze	Wing	Feb 2, 2013	Belgium	2015 Rugby World Cup Qualifier; 2012–14 European Nations Cup First Division	King Baudouin Stadium; Brussels	
218	Vazha Khutsishvili	(Scrum-half)	Feb 23, 2013	Russia	2015 Rugby World Cup Qualifier; 2012–14 European Nations Cup First Division	Sochi	
219	Lasha Lomidze	(Lock)	Feb 23, 2013	Russia	2015 Rugby World Cup Qualifier; 2012–14 European Nations Cup First Division	Sochi	
220	Zurabi Zhvania	(Prop)	Mar 9, 2013	Spain	2015 Rugby World Cup Qualifier; 2012–14 European Nations Cup First Division	Mikheil Meskhi Stadium; Tbilisi	
221	Giorgi Tetrashvili	(Prop)	Jun 7, 2013	Emerging Ireland	2013 Tbilisi Cup	Avchala Stadium; Tbilisi	
222	Zurab Dzneladze	(Wing)	Jun 16, 2013	South Africa President's XV	2013 Tbilisi Cup	Avchala Stadium; Tbilisi	
223	Revaz Jinchvelashvili	(Center)	Jun 16, 2013	South Africa President's XV	2013 Tbilisi Cup	Avchala Stadium; Tbilisi	
224	Muraz Giorgadze	(Flanker)	Jun 14, 2014	Spain	2014 Tbilisi Cup	Avchala Stadium; Tbilisi	
225	Giorgi Aptsiauri	(Center)	Nov 23, 2014	Japan	Test match	Mikheil Meskhi Stadium; Tbilisi	
226	Alex Khutsishvili	Wing	Feb 7, 2015	Germany	2014–16 European Nations Cup First Division	Heusenstamm	
227	Vasil Lobzhanidze	Scrum-half	Feb 7, 2015	Germany	2014–16 European Nations Cup First Division	Heusenstamm	
228	Nikoloz Khatiashvili	Prop	Jun 13, 2015	Uruguay	2015 Tbilisi Cup	Avchala Stadium; Tbilisi	
229	Giorgi Pruidze	Wing	Jun 13, 2015	Uruguay	2015 Tbilisi Cup	Avchala Stadium; Tbilisi	
230	Saba Shubitidze	Flanker	Jun 13, 2015	Uruguay	2015 Tbilisi Cup	Avchala Stadium; Tbilisi	
231	Archil Bezhiashvili	(Prop)	Jun 13, 2015	Uruguay	2015 Tbilisi Cup	Avchala Stadium; Tbilisi	
232	Beka Gorgadze	(Flanker)	Jun 13, 2015	Uruguay	2015 Tbilisi Cup	Avchala Stadium; Tbilisi	
233	Giorgi Talakhadze	(Center)	Jun 13, 2015	Uruguay	2015 Tbilisi Cup	Avchala Stadium; Tbilisi	
234	Giorgi Tedoradze	(Hooker)	Jun 13, 2015	Uruguay	2015 Tbilisi Cup	Avchala Stadium; Tbilisi	
235	Otar Giorgadze	(Flanker)	Jun 17, 2015	Emerging Italy	2015 Tbilisi Cup	Avchala Stadium; Tbilisi	
236	Irakli Svanidze	(Wing)	Jun 21, 2015	Emerging Ireland	2015 Tbilisi Cup	Avchala Stadium; Tbilisi	
237	Giorgi Melikidze	(Prop)	Feb 6, 2016	Germany	2014–16 European Nations Cup First Division	Avchala Stadium; Tbilisi	
238	Nodar Tcheishvili	(Lock)	Feb 27, 2016	Spain	2014–16 European Nations Cup First Division	Mikheil Meskhi Stadium; Tbilisi	
239	Anzor Sitchinava	(Center)	Nov 12, 2016	Japan	Test match	Mikheil Meskhi Stadium; Tbilisi	
240	Giorgi Koshadze	Center	Nov 18, 2016	Samoa	Test match	Mikheil Meskhi Stadium; Tbilisi	
241	Badri Alkhazashvili	(Hooker)	Nov 18, 2016	Samoa	Test match	Mikheil Meskhi Stadium; Tbilisi	
242	Soso Bekoshvili	(Prop)	Feb 11, 2017	Belgium	2017 Rugby Europe Championship	Le Stade du Petit Heysel; Brussels	
243	Giorgi Chkoidze	(Hooker)	Feb 11, 2017	Belgium	2017 Rugby Europe Championship	Le Stade du Petit Heysel; Brussels	
244	Tornike Mataradze	(Prop)	Feb 11, 2017	Belgium	2017 Rugby Europe Championship	Le Stade du Petit Heysel; Brussels	
245	Giorgi Tsutskiridze	(Flanker)	Feb 11, 2017	Belgium	2017 Rugby Europe Championship	Le Stade du Petit Heysel; Brussels	
246	Gela Aprasidze	(Scrum-half)	Feb 19, 2017	Germany	2017 Rugby Europe Championship	Rustavi	
247	Giorgi Mtchedlishvili	(Lock)	Feb 19, 2017	Germany	2017 Rugby Europe Championship	Rustavi	
248	Lasha Tabidze	(Prop)	Feb 19, 2017	Germany	2017 Rugby Europe Championship	Rustavi	
249	Soso Matiashvili	Wing	Mar 4, 2017	Spain	2017 Rugby Europe Championship	Estadio Municipal Pablo Caceres; Medina del Campo	
250	Badri Liparteliani	(Center)	Mar 4, 2017	Spain	2017 Rugby Europe Championship	Estadio Municipal Pablo Caceres; Medina del Campo	
251	Mirian Modebadze	Wing	Nov 11, 2017	Canada	Test match	Boris Paichadze National Stadium; Tbilisi	
252	Giorgi Kveseladze	(Center)	Nov 11, 2017	Canada	Test match	Boris Paichadze National Stadium; Tbilisi	
253	Mikheil Gachechiladze	(Flanker)	Feb 10, 2018	Belgium	2018 Rugby Europe Championship	Kutaisi	
254	Guram Shengelia	(Lock)	Feb 10, 2018	Belgium	2018 Rugby Europe Championship	Kutaisi	
255	Tedo Abzhandadze	Fly-half	Nov 17, 2018	Samoa	Test match	Avchala Stadium; Tbilisi	
256	Beka Gigashvili	(Prop)	Nov 17, 2018	Samoa	Test match	Avchala Stadium; Tbilisi	
257	Guram Gogichashvili	(Prop)	Nov 17, 2018	Samoa	Test match	Avchala Stadium; Tbilisi	
258	Davit Gigauri	Lock	Feb 9, 2019	Romania	2019 Rugby Europe Championship	Cluj	
259	Beka Saghinadze	Flanker	Feb 9, 2019	Romania	2019 Rugby Europe Championship	Cluj	
260	Vano Karkadze	(Hooker)	Feb 9, 2019	Romania	2019 Rugby Europe Championship	Cluj	
261	Giorgi Javakhia	(Flanker)	Feb 17, 2019	Spain	2019 Rugby Europe Championship	Avchala Stadium; Tbilisi	
262	Grigor Kerdikoshvili	(Lock)	Feb 17, 2019	Spain	2019 Rugby Europe Championship	Avchala Stadium; Tbilisi	
263	Aka Tabutsadze		Feb 9, 2020	Spain		Madrid	
264	Lasha Jaiani		Feb 22, 2020	Belgium		Kutaisi	
265	Demur Tapladze		Feb 22, 2020	Belgium		Kutaisi	
266	Tornike Jalagonia		Mar 7, 2020	Portugal		Paris	
267	Lasha Lomidze		Mar 7, 2020	Portugal		Paris	
268	Lekso Kaulashvili		Oct 23, 2020	Scotland		Murrayfield Stadium; Edinburgh	
269	Sandro Svanidze		Nov 14, 2020	England		Twickenham Stadium; London	
270	Mikheil Alania		Nov 29, 2020	Ireland		Lansdowne Road; Dublin	
271	Davit Niniashvili		Nov 29, 2020	Ireland		Lansdowne Road; Dublin	
272	Giorgi Nutsubidze		Feb 7, 2021	South Africa		Tbilisi	
273	Giorgi Kharaishvili		Mar 6, 2021	Portugal		Lisbon	
274	Irakli Tskhadadze		Mar 6, 2021	Portugal		Lisbon	
275	Giorgi Babunashvili		Mar 20, 2021	Russia		Kaliningrad	
276	Ilia Spanderashvili		Jun 26, 2021	Netherlands		Telavi	
277	Luka Japaridze		Jul 2, 2021	South Africa		Pretoria	
278	Nikoloz Aptsiauri		Feb 6, 2022	Portugal		Tbilisi	
279	Sandro Mamamtavrishvili		Feb 6, 2022	Portugal		Tbilisi	
280	Davit Meshkhi		Feb 6, 2022	Portugal		Tbilisi	
281	Luka Nioradze		Feb 6, 2022	Portugal		Tbilisi	
282	Tornike Kakhoidze		Feb 12, 2022	Netherlands		Amsterdam	
283	Luka Ivanishvili		Mar 12, 2022	Romania		Bucharest	
284	Nika Abuladze		Jul 10, 2022	Italy		Batumi	
285	Mikheil Babunashvili		Jul, 16 2022	Portugal		Kutaisi	
286	Beka Shvangiradze		Jul, 16 2022	Portugal		Kutaisi	
287	Vakh Abdaladze		Nov 6, 2022	Uruguay		Tbilisi	
288	Luka Matkava		Nov 6, 2022	Uruguay		Tbilisi	
289	Guram Papidze		Nov 6, 2022	Uruguay		Tbilisi	
290	Tengiz Peranidze		Nov 6, 2022	Uruguay		Tbilisi	
291	Lado Chachanidze		Nov 12, 2022	Samoa		Tbilisi	
292	Alexsandre Kuntelia		Nov 12, 2022	Samoa		Tbilisi	
293	Sergo Abramishvili		Feb 5, 2023	Germany		Tbilisi	
294	Otar Lashkhi		Feb 5, 2023	Germany		Tbilisi	
295	Tengiz Zamtaradze		Feb 5, 2023	Germany		Tbilisi	
296	Irakli Aptsiauri		Sep 30, 2023	Fiji		Bordeaux	
297	Luka Tsirekidze		Feb 4, 2024	Germany		Dessau	
298	Giorgi Akhaladze		Feb 4, 2024	Germany		Dessau	
299	Guram Ghaniashvili		Feb 4, 2024	Germany		Dessau	
300	Giorgi Kartvelishvili		Feb 4, 2024	Germany		Dessau	
301	Davit Khuroshvili		Feb 4, 2024	Germany		Dessau	
302	Giorgi Mamaiashvili		Feb 4, 2024	Germany		Dessau	
