= History of rugby union matches between Georgia and Russia =

Georgia and Russia have played 24 times, out of which Georgia has won 22 matches and Russia won a single match, 1 match ended in a draw.

They regularly play each other in the Rugby Europe Championship (previously named European Nations Cup). The first match was played in Poland on May 25, 1993, that Russia won 15–9.

Tensions between Georgia and Russia remained high after the war in August 2008, resulting in the scheduling of head-to-head rugby matches on neutral soil during 2009 and 2010.

== Summary ==
=== Overall ===
Georgia and Russia have played each other at the Rugby Europe Championship, Rugby World Cup qualification and the 1996–97 FIRA Tournament.

Details	Played	Won by Georgia	Won by Russia	Drawn	Georgia points	Russia points
In Georgia	12	12	0	1	315	116
In Russia	10	10	0	0	232	113
Neutral venue	3	2	1	0	74	44
Overall	26	24	1	1	621	273

=== Records ===
Note: Date shown in brackets indicates when the record was or last set.

Record	Georgia	Russia
Longest winning streak	20 (13 October 2002–Present)	1 (25 May 1993 – 20 October 1996)
Largest points for
Home	46 (17 March 2012)	23 (4 March 2001)
Away	36 (20 March 2010)	21 (22 March 2009)
Largest winning margin
Home	46 (17 March 2012)	N/A
Away	28 (20 March 2010)	6 (25 May 1993)

== Results ==
No.	Date	Venue	Score	Winner	Competition
1	25 May 1993	Sopot, Poland	15 – 9	Russia	Rugby World Cup Qualifying 1995
2	20 October 1996	Dinamo Arena, Tbilisi	29 – 20	Georgia	1996–97 FIRA Tournament
3	20 May 1998	Dinamo Arena, Tbilisi	12 – 6	Georgia	Rugby World Cup Qualifying 1999
4	4 March 2001	Krasnodar	23 – 25	Georgia	2000–01 European Nations Cup First Division
5	3 March 2002	Dinamo Arena, Tbilisi	12 – 12	draw	2001–02 European Nations Cup First Division
6	13 October 2002	Dinamo Arena, Tbilisi	17 – 13	Georgia	Rugby World Cup Qualifying 2003
7	9 March 2003	Krasnodar	17 – 23	Georgia	2003–04 European Nations Cup First Division
8	6 March 2004	Mikheil Meskhi Stadium, Tbilisi	9 – 3	Georgia	2003–04 European Nations Cup First Division
9	20 November 2004	Krasnodar	15 – 27	Georgia	Rugby World Cup Qualifying 2007
10	4 February 2006	Dinamo Arena, Tbilisi	46 – 19	Georgia	Rugby World Cup Qualifying 2007
11	24 March 2007	Dinamo Arena, Tbilisi	31 – 12	Georgia	2006–08 European Nations Cup First Division
12	12 April 2008	Krasnoyarsk	12 – 18	Georgia	2006–08 European Nations Cup First Division
13	22 March 2009	Illichivets Stadium, Mariupol, Ukraine	21 – 29	Georgia	Rugby World Cup Qualifying 2011
14	20 March 2010	Akçaabat Fatih Stadium, Trabzon, Turkey	36 – 8	Georgia	Rugby World Cup Qualifying 2011
15	19 March 2011	Sochi Central Stadium, Sochi	9 – 15	Georgia	2010–12 European Nations Cup First Division
16	17 March 2012	Mikheil Meskhi Stadium, Tbilisi	46 – 0	Georgia	2010–12 European Nations Cup First Division
17	23 February 2013	Sochi Central Stadium, Sochi	9 – 23	Georgia	Rugby World Cup Qualifying 2015
18	22 February 2014	Dinamo Arena, Tbilisi	36 – 10	Georgia	Rugby World Cup Qualifying 2015
19	14 March 2015	Mikheil Meskhi Stadium, Tbilisi	33 – 0	Georgia	2014–16 European Nations Cup First Division
20	12 March 2016	Sochi Central Stadium, Sochi	7 – 24	Georgia	2014–16 European Nations Cup First Division
21	12 March 2017	Dinamo Arena, Tbilisi	28 – 14	Georgia	2017 Rugby Europe Championship
22	10 March 2018	Kuban Stadium, Krasnodar	9 – 29	Georgia	2018 Rugby Europe Championship
23	17 March 2019	Kuban Stadium, Krasnodar	6 – 22	Georgia	2019 Rugby Europe Championship
24	7 February 2021	Mikheil Meskhi Stadium, Tbilisi	16 – 7	Georgia	2020 Rugby Europe Championship
25	20 March 2021	Kaliningrad Stadium, Kaliningrad	6 – 23	Georgia	Rugby World Cup Qualifying 2023
26	27 February 2022	Dinamo Arena, Tbilisi	w/o	Georgia	Rugby World Cup Qualifying 2023
