= 1995 Rugby World Cup qualifying =

Rugby qualifying competition

Tournament details
- Dates: 1991 – 1995
- No. of nations: 56

The 1995 Rugby World Cup was preceded by a qualifying campaign in which forty-five nations were entered. 16 teams participated in the finals tournament in South Africa, seven of which came through qualifying matches. Eight were granted automatic entry as they were quarter-finalists at the 1991 Rugby World Cup, and South Africa qualified automatically as hosts.

== Tournaments ==
- Africa qualification
- European qualification
- Americas qualification
- Asia qualification
- Oceania qualification

== Qualified teams ==
	Africa	Americas	Asia	Europe	Oceania
Qualified at 1991 RWC	South Africa (hosts)	Canada		England; France; Ireland; Scotland	Australia (holders); New Zealand; Western Samoa
Qualified via Regional Slots	Ivory Coast (Africa 1)	Argentina (Americas 1)	Japan (Asia 1)	Wales (Europe 1); Italy (Europe 2); Romania (Europe 3)	Tonga (Oceania 1)
