= Georgia national rugby union team =

National rugby union team

Georgia
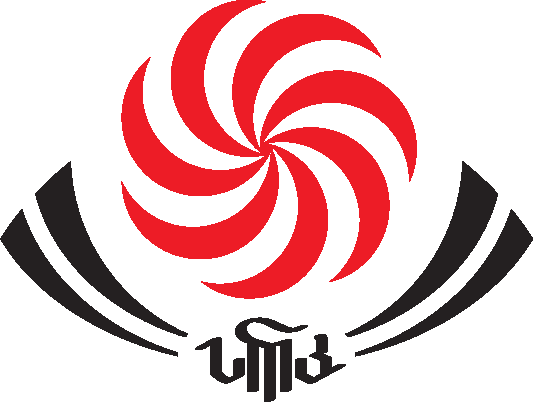
- Nicknames: Borjgalosnebi; Lelos
- Emblem: Borjgali
- Union: Georgian Rugby Union
- Head coach: Pierre-Henry Broncan
- Captain: Beka Gorgadze
- Most caps: Davit Kacharava; Sandro Todua (122)
- Top scorer: Merab Kvirikashvili (838)
- Top try scorer: Aka Tabutsadze (58)
- Home stadium: Various
First colours	Second colours

World Rugby ranking
- Current: 13 (as of 6 July 2026)
- Highest: 11 (2016, 2019, 2023, 2025)
- Lowest: 23 (2004)

First international
- Georgia 16–3 Zimbabwe (Kutaisi, Georgia; 12 September 1989)

Biggest win
- Georgia 110–0 Switzerland (Tbilisi, Georgia; 1 February 2025)

Biggest defeat
- England 84–6 Georgia (Perth, Australia; 12 October 2003)

World Cup
- Appearances: 7 (first in 2003)
- Best result: Pool stage (2003, 2007, 2011, 2015, 2019 and 2023)
- Website: rugby.ge/nationalteam

The Georgia national rugby union team, nicknamed The Lelos, represents Georgia in men's international competitions, They are administered by the Georgian Rugby Union.

The team takes part in the annual Rugby Europe Championship, from 2026 the biennial World Rugby Nations Cup and the Rugby World Cup which takes place every four years and in which it has appeared continuously since 2003.

Georgia is currently considered one of the strongest second-tier rugby union nations. It is one of the world's fastest-growing rugby nations. The Lelos participate in the Rugby Europe Championship, winning the tournament in 2001 and every year since 2006–08, with the exception of 2017. The bulk of the national squad are based in France, in both the Top 14 and lower divisions. This is a practice that was popularised by the former national team coach, Claude Saurel, a Frenchman. Rugby is one of the most popular sports in Georgia, with many similarities to the ancient Georgian folk-sport of Lelo burti, from which the national team derives its nickname. The national team qualified for the Rugby World Cup six times, first in 2003 – playing against rugby powers such as England and South Africa. The Lelos won their first ever World Cup match in 2007, when they beat Namibia 30–0. Since 2013, Georgia has hosted the World Rugby Tbilisi Cup.

== Honours ==
- World Rugby Nations Cup
  - Winners (1): 2026 (shared record)
- Rugby Europe International Championship
  - Winners (17): 2001, 2006–08, 2008–09, 2011, 2012, 2013, 2014, 2015, 2016, 2018, 2019, 2020, 2021, 2022, 2023, 2024, 2025 (record)
- Antim Cup
  - Winners (20): 2005, 2007, 2008, 2009, 2011, 2012, 2013, 2014, 2015, 2016, 2018, 2019, 2020, 2021, 2022, 2023 (1), 2023 (2), 2024, 2025, 2026 (record)

== History ==
=== Soviet era ===
There were several unsuccessful attempts to introduce rugby union into Georgia, the earliest known being in 1928, with subsequent attempts also in 1940 and in 1948. Rugby was introduced to Georgia by Jacques Haspekian, an Armenian man from Marseille in France who taught the game to students in the late 1950s through to the mid-1960s, although he then subsequently returned in France. He is still alive and living in Marseilles, he was interviewed on French radio on the occasion of Georgia playing France in the 2007 Rugby World Cup. The first rugby session was held on 15 October 1959 in Tbilisi, at the racecourse, where 20 people attended the meeting. The first Georgian club formed was the GPI (Georgian Polytechnical Institute), now known as "Qochebi".

Rugby's popularity in Georgia might be explained by its resemblance to the traditional Georgian game named "Lelo" or "Lelo Burti" (meaning "Field Ball"). This game was played in Georgia from ancient times and is still played on occasions in rural areas. A field ("Lelo") was selected between two river creeks which represented a playing ground. Two teams, usually consisting of the male population of neighboring villages, would face each other. The number of players from each side was not set, but included any able men each village could summon. A large, heavy ball was placed in the middle of the field and the goal of the game was to carry it over the river creek of the opposing side.

The first teams appeared in 1959. The Georgia Rugby Union was founded in 1964, but until the late 1980s it was part of the Soviet Union's rugby federation. The rugby union connection between France and Georgia started as links were established by the then powerful French Communist Party and many other left-wing organisations. Georgia initially did not have its own team and its best players would play for the USSR team.

In 1988 Georgia produced their first national sevens side, while still a Soviet republic. In September 1989, Georgia got together with other FIRA countries to host a tour by Zimbabwe. Zimbabwe's first match on the tour was in the wet against Georgia in Kutaisi, west of Tbilisi, which Georgia won 16–3. The next year Georgia went to Zimbabwe where they played two tests, losing the first in Bulawayo and winning the second 26–10 in Harare.

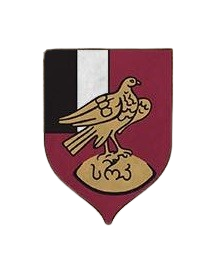
The first Georgian Rugby Union team official logo, 1989

=== 1990s ===
On 9 April 1991 Georgia declared independence from the Soviet Union. Georgia was now a rugby union nation but getting matches was not easy: Commonwealth of Independent States, which Georgia did not join, was the successor team of the Soviet Union and played matches in 1992. Georgia were limited to the odd game against Ukraine until they gained membership of the World Rugby in 1992.

French coach, Claude Saurel, first arrived in Georgia in 1997 with a brief to assess the standard of sport; he and his development team have helped boost the profile of the sport. Saurel went on to work with the Georgia national rugby sevens team, until he was appointed as the national coach in the summer of 1999.

Georgia's 1998 loss to Romania saw them play a two legged repechage play-off against Tonga to qualify for the 1999 World Cup. On that occasion Georgia lost the first leg 37–6 in Nukuʻalofa before a 28–27 win in Tbilisi. This was not enough and Georgia failed to qualify.

=== 2000s: World Cup play ===
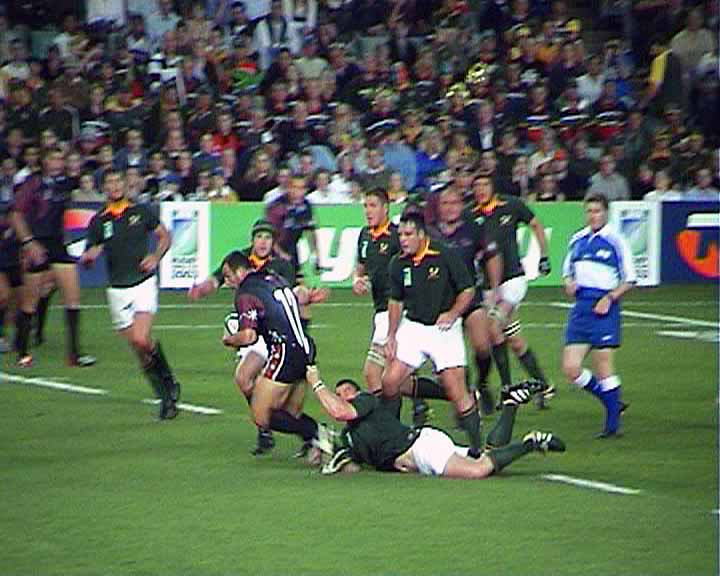
Georgia against the Springboks during the Rugby World Cup 2003

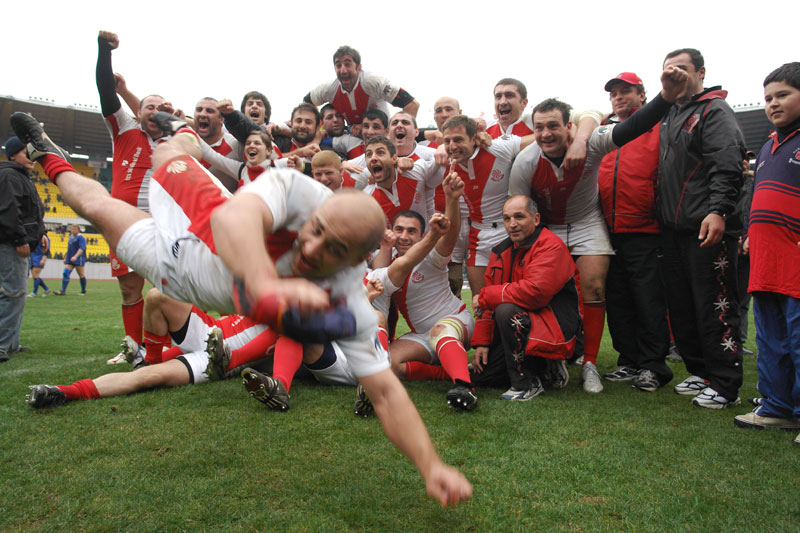
Georgian team celebrating victory

After France and Italy dropped from the reborn European Nations Cup, Georgia became a major force in the tournament. In 2000, Georgia finished second in the competition, finishing behind Romania. Rugby union took off in the country, the travel and opportunities to land lucrative contracts in France made rugby union a glamorous pursuit in Georgia. Georgia placed second in the 2001–02 tournament. When Georgia played Russia in the European Nations Cup 65,000 people crammed into the national stadium in Tbilisi.

Georgian first made an impact at Rugby Sevens by finishing a respectable 10th in the 2001 edition of the Rugby World Cup Sevens in Argentina.

In October 2002 Georgia faced Russia, in what was at the time one of the most important clashes ever between the two national sides. The victorious nation would head to the 2003 Rugby World Cup, and the loser would be relegated to fight it out for a repechage position. Neither nation had ever been to a World Cup, though Georgia had come close in 1999. 50,000 spectators turned out to the national stadium. Both nations kicked penalty goals in the first half, but Russia moved ahead with a 13–9 lead through a try, but Georgia were able to score a try of their own just before half time, with Levan Tsabadze putting them in front 14–13 at the break. Georgia held on, winning 17–13, a victory which sparked celebrations throughout the capital. Three of the 75 French-based Georgian players were denied permission to play in the tournament and were suspended. Another five were sacked and arrived in Australia as free agents. In a warm-up game held in Asti the Georgians lost to Italians 31–22.

In the 2003 Rugby World Cup, Georgia were grouped into pool C alongside giants – South Africa and England. They suffered their heaviest ever defeat when beaten by England 84–6 in their opening game. In their second match, Samoa comfortably eased to a 46–9 victory. Although they performed well against the Springboks (losing 46–19) they were disappointingly defeated by Uruguay 24–12, in a match that they were expected to win. They lost all four of their matches but had impressed against South Africa. Despite the sad financial state of their union, qualification has seen the sport's profile rise throughout Georgia.

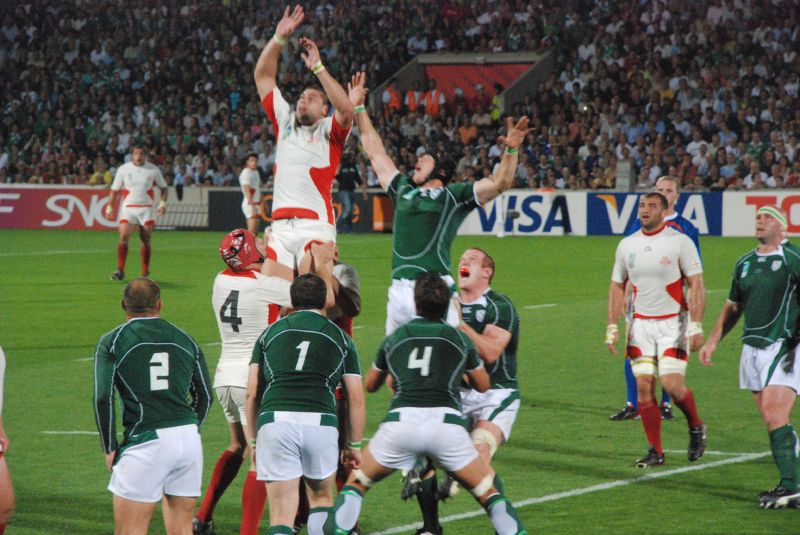
Lineout for Georgia during their loss to Ireland in the 2007 World Cup.

In the 2007 Rugby World Cup Georgia were drawn against Argentina, Ireland, Namibia and tournament hosts France in Pool D. The team recorded their first win in the rugby world cup with a 30–0 win over Namibia in their Pool D match at Stade Felix-Bollaert. The foundation for the victory was laid by Georgia's experienced forward pack who wore down their opponents at the breakdown. The 2007 world cup campaign is also well remembered for Georgians by a brilliant display against Ireland, where Georgia narrowly lost the match 10–14. The tournament was over with 7–64 defeat to hosts France on 30 September.

=== 2010–2019 ===
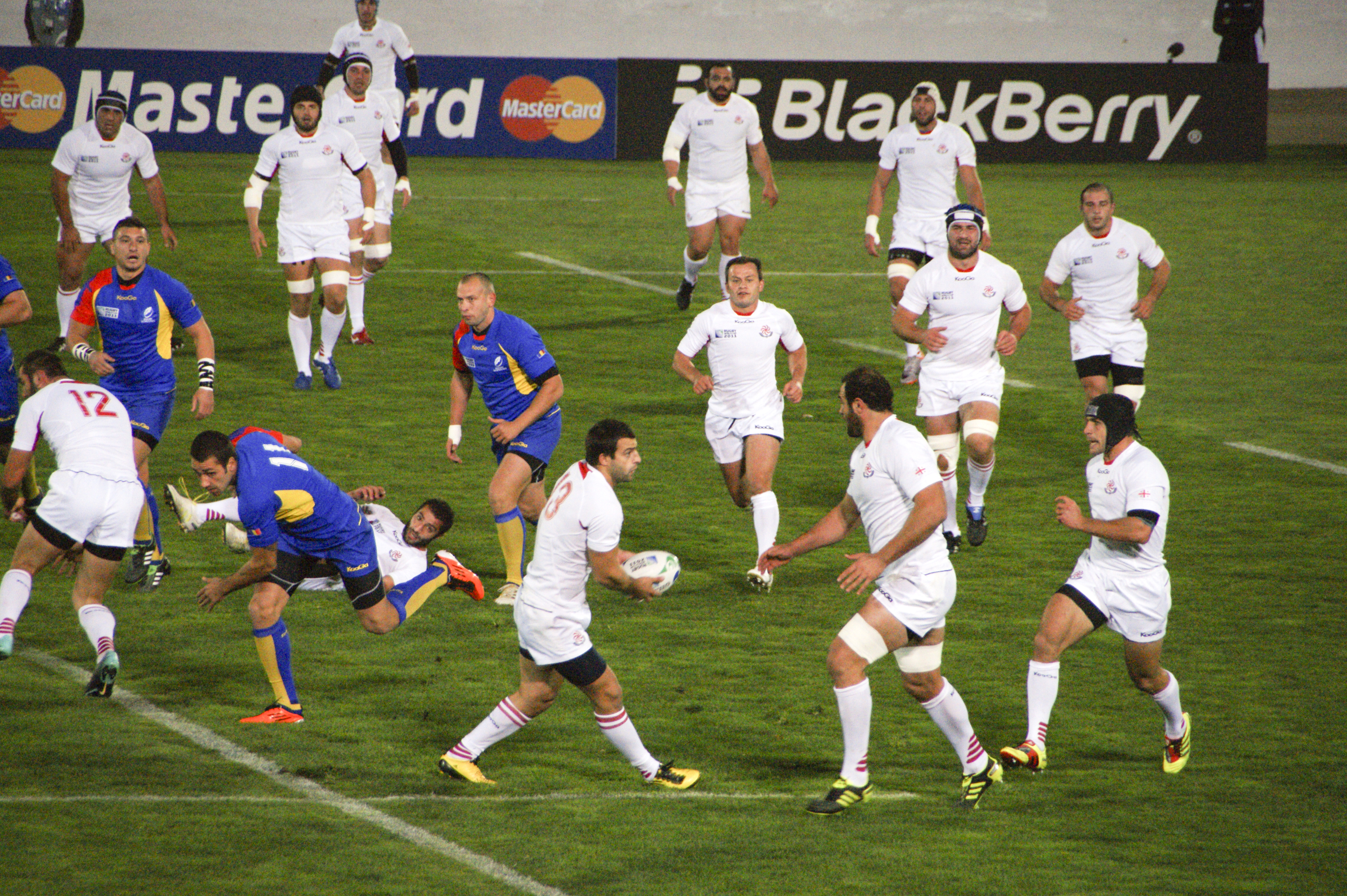
Georgia vs Romania at Arena Manawatu, Palmerston North. Georgia won 25–9.

At 2011 Rugby World Cup, Georgia's Pool B included England, Argentina and Scotland, as well as local rivals Romania. Despite the close nature of their pool, Georgia were impressive in all matches, including a tight match against Scotland which was lost 15–6, thus missing a bonus point narrowly and a 41–10 loss against England, which featured a man-of-the-match performance by flanker Mamuka Gorgodze. Georgia went on to record only their second ever Rugby World Cup win against Romania, winning 25–9 with another man-of-the-match performance by Mamuka Gorgodze. Georgia finished their campaign with a strong showing against Argentina, leading 7–5 at half time before conceding 20 unanswered points to lose 25–7. Thus Georgia finished their campaign with 1 win and 3 losses.

In the 2015 Rugby World Cup Georgia played against Tonga, Argentina, title holders New Zealand and the top African qualifier Namibia in Pool C. The group opener finished with Georgia's 17–10 victory against Tonga. their third win in a World Cup match. Georgia lost their second match against Argentina 9–54, after trailing 14–9 at half-time. In the third match Georgia were defeated by New Zealand 43–10 in Cardiff. Again in the first half The Lelos held very well against the All Blacks, trailing the world champions 22–10.

In the last match Georgia defeated Namibia 17–16 to finish third, their highest in a world cup, and securing their qualification for 2019 Rugby World Cup at the same time.

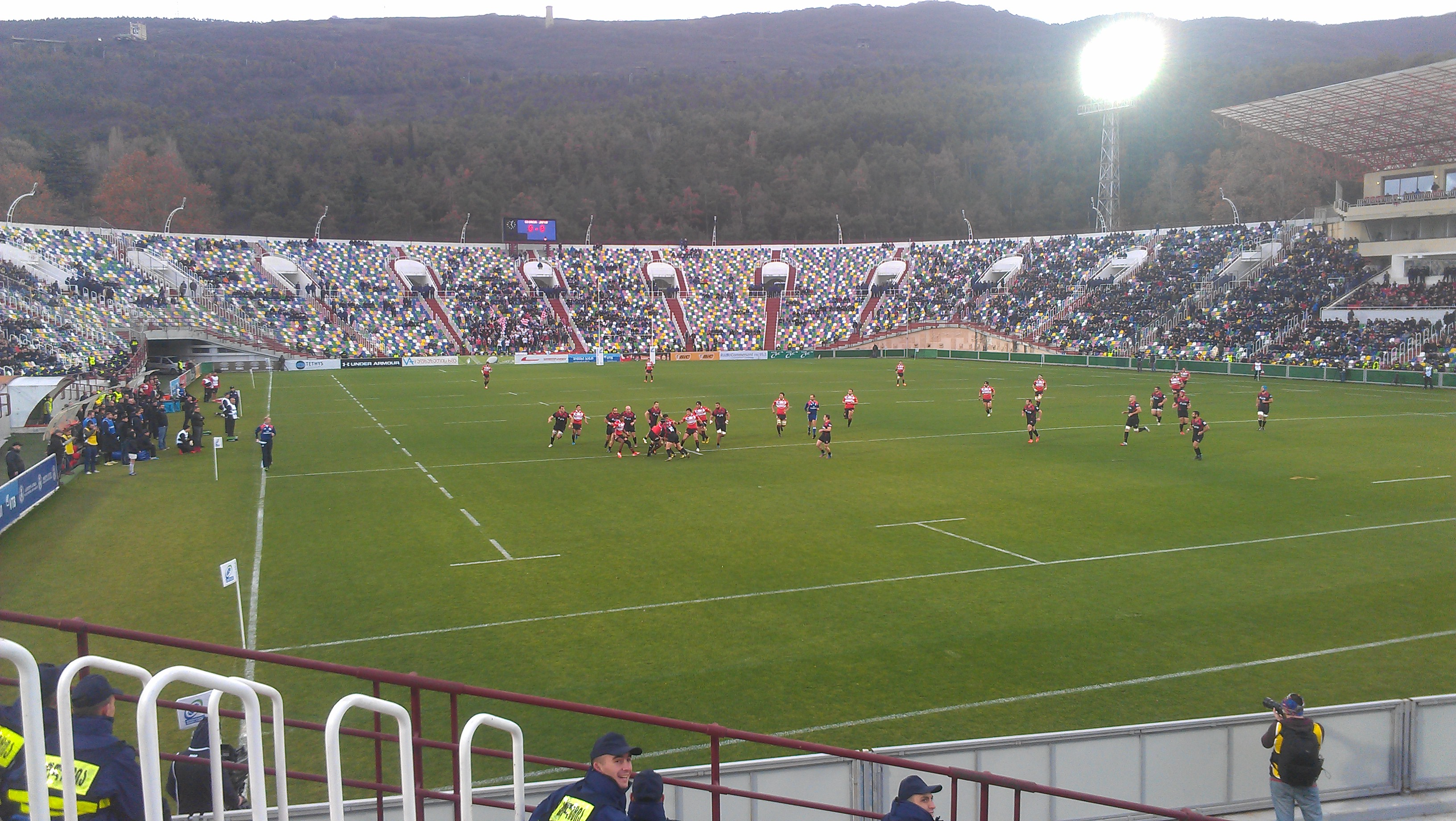
Georgia vs Japan at Mikheil Meskhi Stadium in 2014

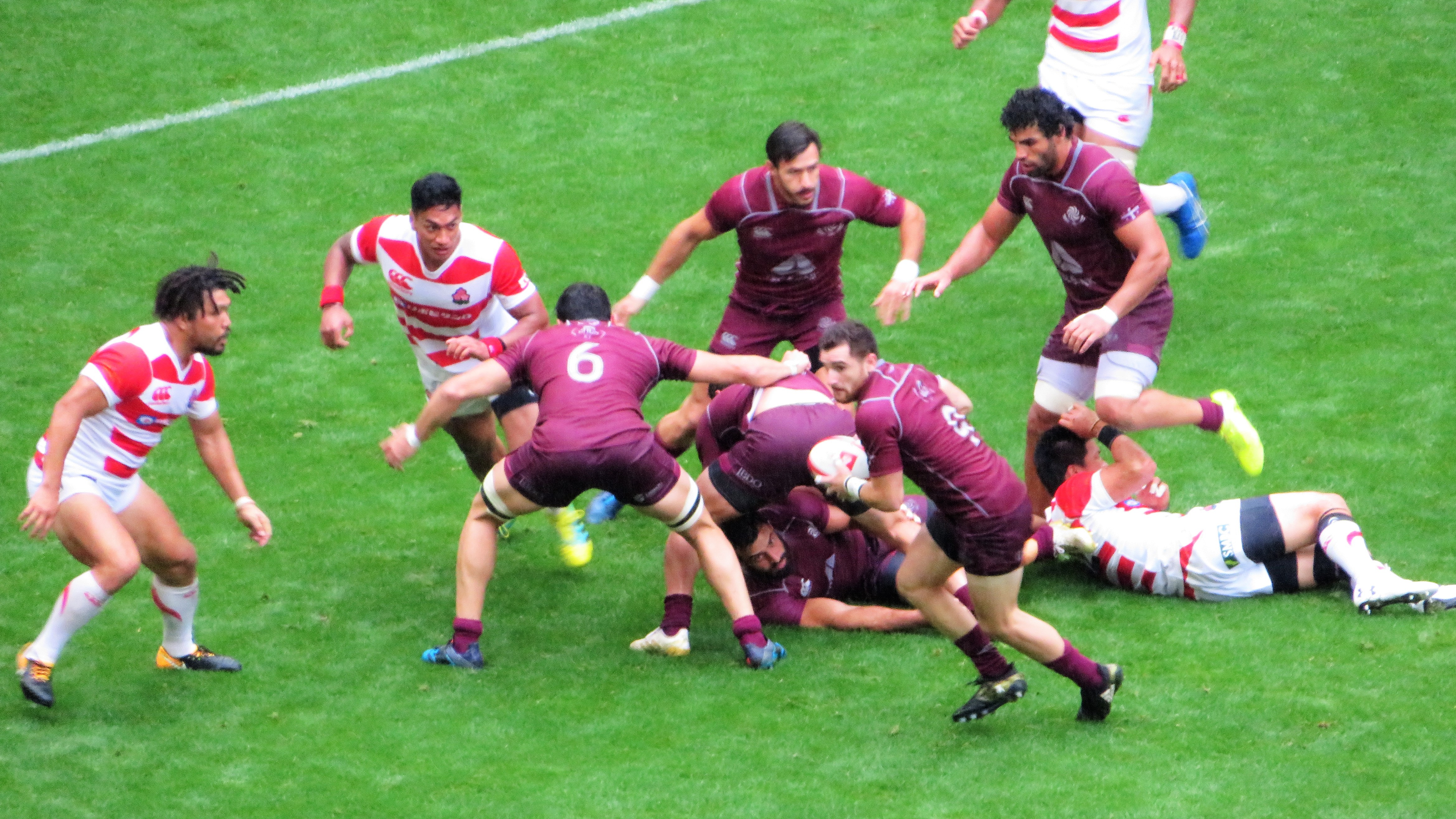
Georgia vs Japan at Toyota Stadium in 2018

In 2016, Georgia once again cemented its claim to be the seventh best national rugby team in Europe, when they won the European Nations Cup for the sixth consecutive time, with 10 wins from 10 matches. In the 2016 mid-year internationals the Lelos traveled to the Pacific islands for the first time and finished the historic tour unbeaten with 19–19 draw against Samoa, 23–20 victory against Tonga and 14–3 victory against Fiji.

=== 2019 World Cup ===
Georgia approached the 2019 World Cup with confidence and it had just won three of the four European Nations Championship, with a squad that combined youth (Abzhandadze, Kveseladze) and experience (Mamukashvili, Chilachava, Bregvadze). The Georgian federation aimed to reproduce the same performance as in 2015 by finishing third in the group. However, Georgia inherited a strong field made up of Australia, Wales, Fiji and Uruguay. On 23 September, the Lelos began the competition by facing Wales with a 43–14 for the British. Six days later, Uruguay faced the Georgians, four days after the South Americans beat the Fijians 30–27. Final score for the Lelos 33–7. Georgia then met Fiji, their rival for third place which means automatic qualification for 2023 in a 10–45 match for the islanders where we will see 3/4 Georgians. Georgia ended up with an honorable 27–8 defeat against the already qualified Australians. The results were disappointing for the Georgians. The team finished fourth behind Fiji and were forced to go through the qualification box for 2023. During this Cup, Georgia showed progress but still lacked organization from an offensive point of view, individual and collective quality for three quarters, and often breaks down during the hour of play on a physical level.

=== 2020–2023 ===
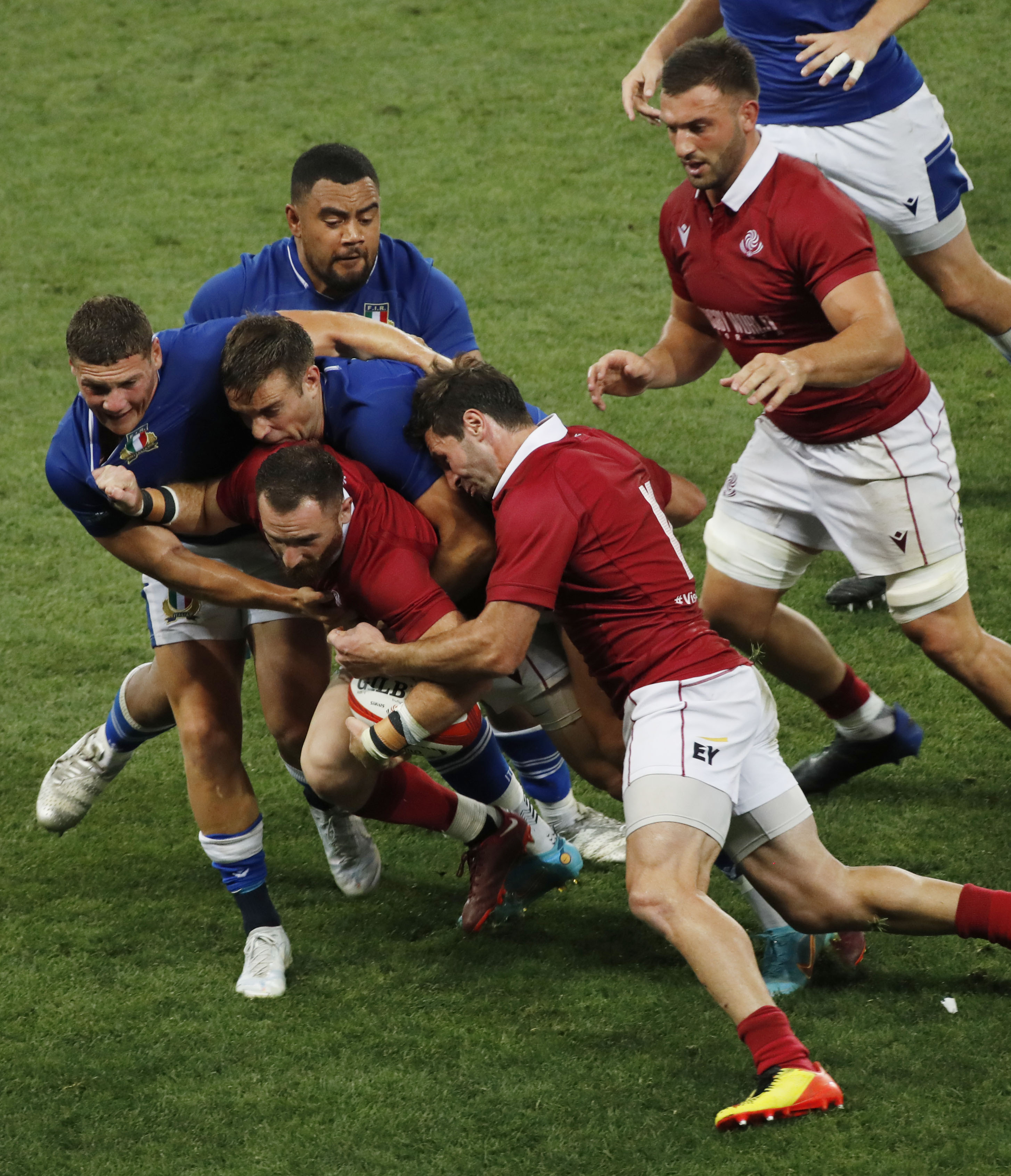
Georgia vs Italy, 2022

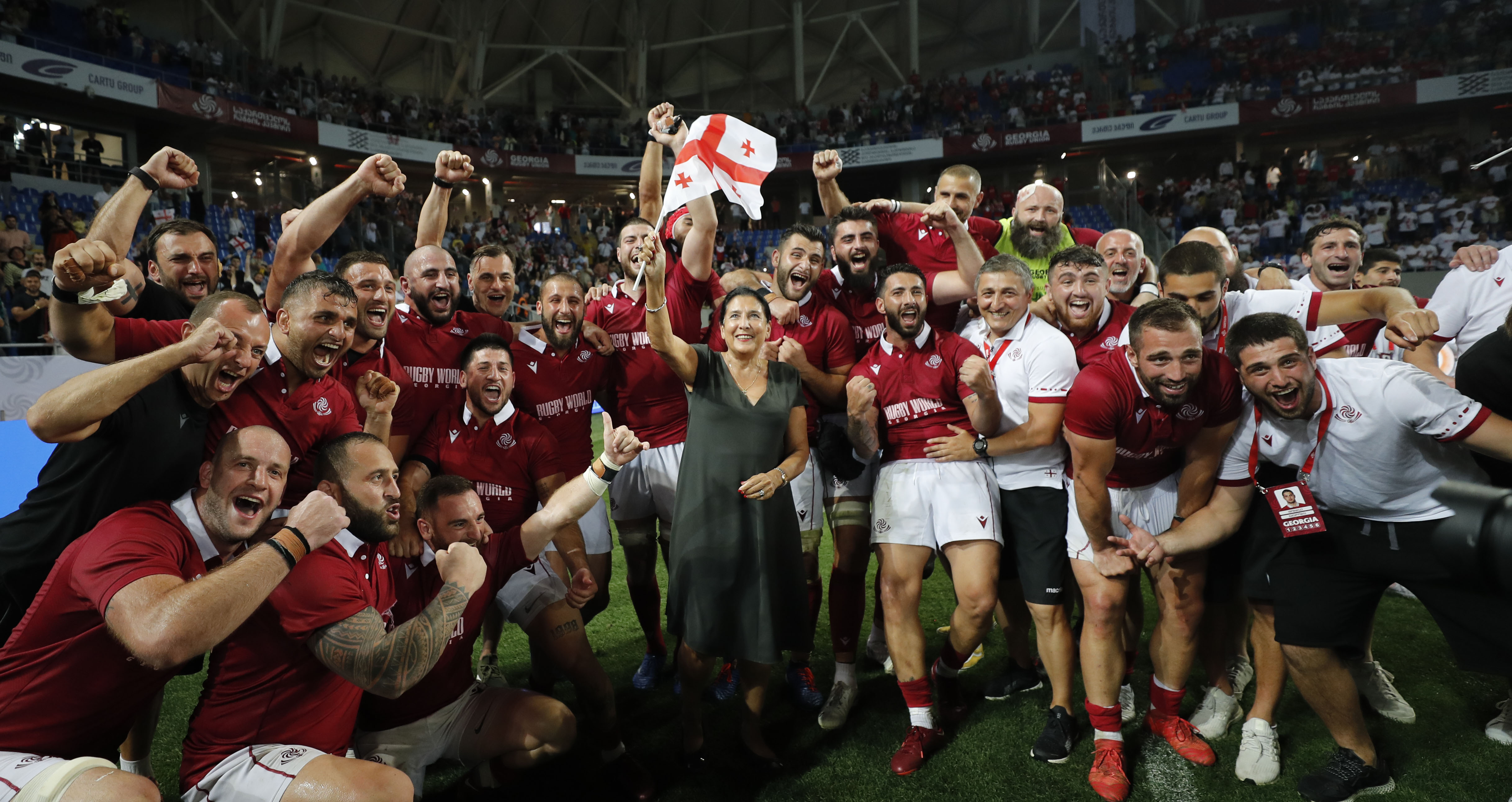
Georgian President Salome Zourabichvili with the Georgian team after their historic win against Italy in Batumi, 2022

In this post-World Cup year, Georgia faced two significant changes. Milton Haig, who left after a positive record, had been replaced by his deputy Levan Maisashvili. Additionally, the squad had to undergo a renewal process following the retirement of key players such as Mamukashvili, Begadze, and Malaguradze.

On 1 February, Georgia clashed with their Romanian rivals in the 2020 European Nations Championship, concluding with a 41–13 victory for the Lelos. Subsequent matches included a 10–23 loss to the Spaniards, a dominant 78–6 victory against the Belgians, and a close 24–39 battle against Portugal. Despite their promising performance, the Lelos' journey in the competition was abruptly halted by the COVID-19 pandemic.

In October, the Georgian federation received an invitation to participate in the Autumn Nations Cup, which brought together the six teams from the Six Nations Tournament, Fiji, and Georgia. Placed in a pool with England, Ireland, and Wales, the Georgians finished last in the competition after conceding a classification match against Fiji. In July 2022, Georgia beat a Tier 1 nation for the first time, Italy, 28–19.In November 2022, Georgia beat Wales 13–12 in Cardiff. During the European Rugby Championship 2023, Georgia again dominated its opponents and clinched the 15th title.

=== 2023 World Cup ===
During the 2023 Rugby World Cup Georgia dramatically underperformed expectations. Playing in a pool lacking one of the four tournament favourites, but notable for strength in depth, Georgia aimed to cause an upset against one of the three tier one sides and guarantee automatic qualification for 2027. They came last in their pool having not won a game, despite some relatively strong showings.

They got off to a rocky start with a 35–15 loss to Australia on 9 September; though they had not expected to win, it was thought they might put up a better fight. Next, more concerningly, on 23 September they drew with the only other Tier two team in the pool, Portugal by a score of 18–18 in a match they were expected to win; 7 days later they put up a strong fight against Fiji but were eventually defeated 17–12 before finishing on 7 October getting beaten by Wales 43–19. A shock victory for Portugal against Fiji condemned Georgia to fifth place in the pool, although the extension of the 2027 World Cup to 24 teams announced shortly afterwards relieved some of the concerns for future qualification. Georgia returned to form, however, in the following Rugby Europe International championship, once more winning the second-tier competition convincingly.

=== 2024–Present ===
Georgia started 2024 by winning the 2024 Rugby Europe Championship, their 16th title.

After beating the Netherlands in the 2025 Rugby Europe Championship, Georgia qualified for the 2027 Men's Rugby World Cup.

In March 2026, six of the team's players were suspended by WADA and World Rugby for doping, with WADA also finding collusion between the Georgian Anti-Doping Agency and members of team staff.

== Lelo ==
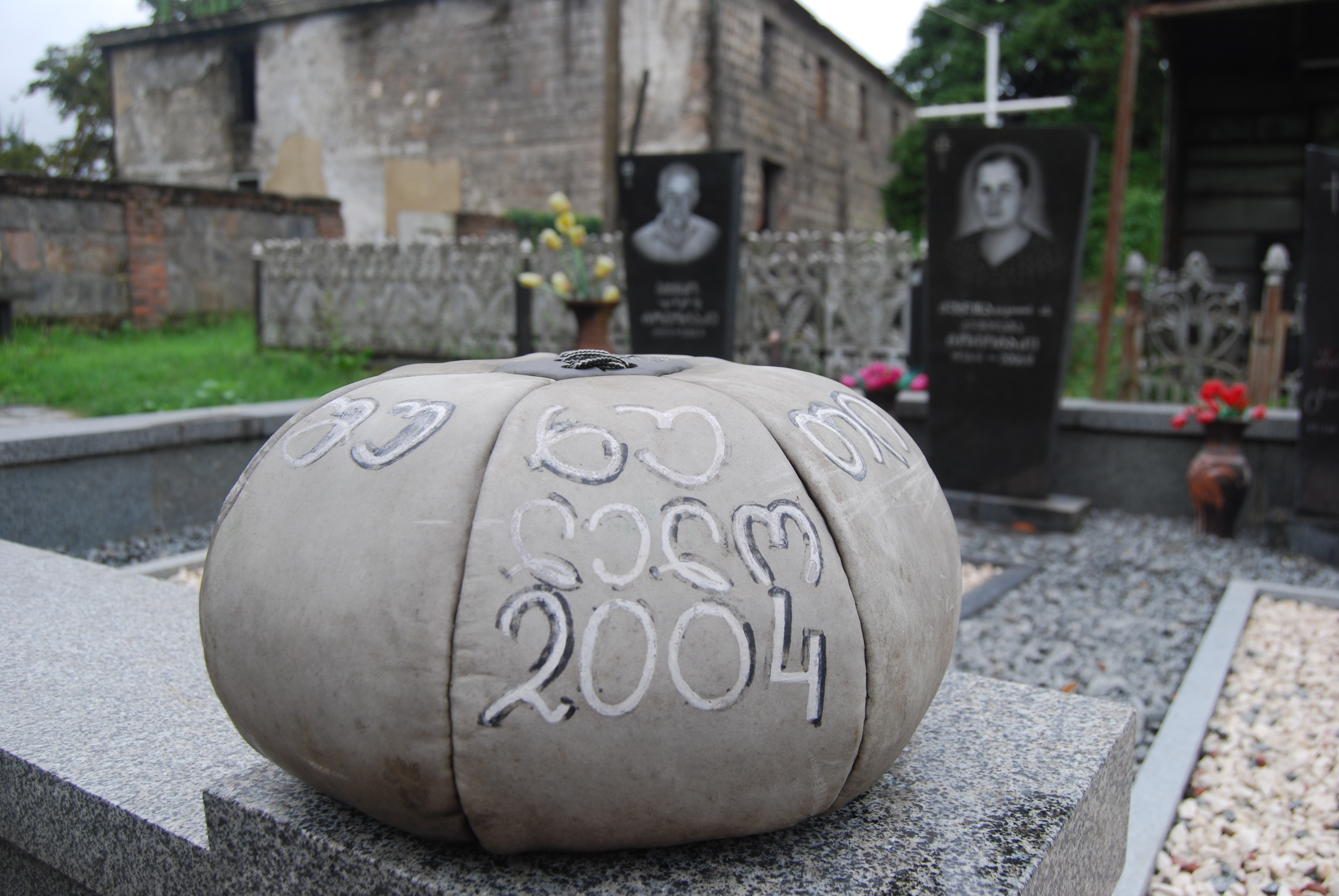
A Lelo ball at the Shukhuti cemetery.

Lelo or lelo burti (Georgian: ლელო ბურთი), literally a "field ball [playing]", is a Georgian folk sport, which is a full contact ball game, and very similar to rugby, itself a public school codification of older folk football games. Within Georgian rugby union terminology, the word lelo is used to mean a try, and the popularity of rugby union in Georgia has also been attributed to it. In 2014, lelo burti, along with khridoli, a traditional martial art, was inscribed by the government of Georgia as a "nonmaterial monument" of culture.

It appears in the 12th century Georgian epic poem The Knight in the Panther's Skin in which the characters play lelo burti.

== Kits ==
=== Kit evolution ===
RWC 2003	RWC 2007	RWC 2011	RWC 2015	2017–18	RWC 2019	2020–21	2022–23

RWC 2003	RWC 2007	RWC 2011	RWC 2015	2017–18	RWC 2019	2020–21	2022–23

== Record ==
=== Wins against tier-one nations ===
10 July 2022	Georgia	28–19	Italy	Batumi Stadium, Batumi
20:00 GET (UTC+4)	Try: Todua 11' m Abzhandadze (2) 13' c, 36' c Con: Abzhandadze (2/3) 14', 37'; Pen: Abzhandadze (2/3) 55', 78'; Aprasidze (1/1) 71'		Try: Menoncello 20' c Con: Allan (1/1) 21'; Pen: Allan (4/5) 27', 33', 51', 72'	Attendance: ~20,000; Referee: Brendon Pickerill (New Zealand)

19 November 2022	Wales	12–13	Georgia	Millennium Stadium, Cardiff
13:00 GMT (UTC+0)	Try: Morgan (2) 20' c, 24' m Con: Priestland (1/2) 21'	Report	Try: Todua 59' c Con: Abzhandadze (1/1) 60'; Pen: Abzhandadze (1/2) 2'; Matkava (1/1) 78'	Attendance: 63,585; Referee: Andrea Piardi (Italy)

13 July 2024	Japan	23–25	Georgia	Yurtec Stadium Sendai, Sendai
19:05 JST (UTC+09)	Try: Naikabula 3' c Osada 64' c Con: Lee (2/2) 4', 65'; Pen: Lee (3/3) 17', 25', 56'	Report	Try: Karkadze 20' m Alania 28' c Javakhia 74' c Con: Matkava (2/3) 29', 75'; Pen: Matkava (2/2) 9', 12'	Attendance: 15,903; Referee: Andrea Piardi (Italy)

=== Overall ===
Men's World Rugby Rankings Top 20 as of 16 November 2026
Rank	Change (Note: Change from the previous week)	Team	Points
1	Steady	South Africa	91.53
2	Steady	New Zealand	90.65
3	▲1	France	89.05
4	▼1	Ireland	88.70
5	Steady	England	86.99
6	Steady	Scotland	85.28
7	Steady	Australia	82.24
8	Steady	Argentina	82.09
9	▲1	Wales	79.37
10	▼1	Fiji	77.79
11	Steady	Italy	75.84
12	Steady	Japan	75.25
13	Steady	Georgia	74.23
14	▲1	United States	68.39
15	▼1	Portugal	68.24
16	▲3	Samoa	67.60
17	▲1	Chile	67.00
18	▼2	Spain	66.53
19	▼2	Tonga	65.58
20	Steady	Uruguay	65.17

Georgia's historical rankings

Source: World Rugby
Graph updated to 16 November 2026

Georgia has won 185 of their 297 representative matches, a winning record of 62%. Since World Rankings were introduced by World Rugby in September 2003, Georgia have occupied below number ten the majority of the time. Georgia have consistently ranked as the seventh European nation in men's rugby, immediately below the Six Nations, for two decades.

Below is a table of the representative rugby matches played by a Georgia national XV at test level up until 11 July 2026, updated after match with Samoa.

Opponent	Played	Won	Drawn	Lost	Win %	For	Aga
Argentina	5	0	0	5	0%	66	186
Argentina XV	4	2	0	2	50%	78	91
Australia	3	0	0	3	0%	52	102
Barbarians	1	0	0	1	0%	19	28
Belgium	6	6	0	0	100%	254	31
Bulgaria	1	1	0	0	100%	70	8
Canada	8	5	0	3	62.5%	183	158
Chile	2	1	0	1	50%	53	36
Croatia	1	1	0	0	100%	29	15
Czech Republic	8	8	0	0	100%	310	58
Denmark	1	1	0	0	100%	19	8
England	3	0	0	3	0%	16	165
Fiji	8	1	1	6	12.5%	121	200
France	2	0	0	2	0%	22	105
(France) French Barbarians	1	1	0	0	100%	16	15
(France) French Universities	1	1	0	0	100%	24	20
Germany	10	10	0	0	100%	521	64
Ireland	6	0	0	6	0%	46	253
Emerging Ireland	3	0	0	3	0%	32	105
Italy	5	1	0	4	20%	91	149
Italy A	7	3	0	4	75%	115	162
Japan	8	2	0	6	25%	144	198
Kazakhstan	1	1	0	0	100%	17	5
Latvia	1	1	0	0	100%	28	3
Luxembourg	1	0	1	0	0%	10	10
Moldova	1	1	0	0	100%	47	5
Morocco	1	1	0	0	100%	20	10
Namibia	5	4	0	1	80%	112	73
Netherlands	10	9	0	1	90%	456	126
New Zealand	1	0	0	1	0%	10	43
All Blacks XV	1	0	0	1	0%	13	31
Poland	2	0	0	2	0%	29	52
Portugal	28	19	4	5	67.86%	694	391
Romania	31	21	1	9	66.67%	756	487
Russia	26	24	1	1	92.31%	621	273
Samoa	7	4	1	2	57.14%	143	147
Scotland	6	0	0	6	0%	54	219
Scotland A	2	1	0	1	100%	25	90
South Africa	3	0	0	3	0%	38	141
South Africa A	6	1	0	5	16.67%	84	108
Spain	28	24	1	3	85.19%	940	430
Switzerland	3	3	0	0	100%	186	24
Tonga	8	6	0	2	75%	141	148
Ukraine	9	9	0	0	100%	281	63
United States	8	5	0	3	62.5%	182	183
Uruguay	8	6	0	2	71.43%	193	131
Wales	5	1	0	4	20%	52	129
Zimbabwe	3	2	0	1	66.67%	58	35
Total	299	187	10	102	62.54%	7,471	5,514

=== World Cup ===
Georgia has competed in six Rugby World Cup tournaments. Their first appearance was in 2003 when they were placed in Pool C with England, South Africa, Uruguay and Samoa. In 2007 Georgia recorded their first win in the Rugby World Cup with a 30–0 win over Namibia in their Pool D match at Stade Bollaert-Delelis. The Lelos best performance was in 2015, where they finished third in a group for the first time. Georgia have to date won five World Cup matches, drawn one and lost eighteen.

Rugby World Cup record									Qualification						
Year	Round	Pld	W	D	L	PF	PA	Squad	Pos	Pld	W	D	L	PF	PA
(New Zealand) (Australia) 1987	Part of the Soviet Union: Not an independent country								—						
(England) (France) (Ireland) (Scotland) (Wales) 1991	Part of the Soviet Union: Not an independent country								—						
(South Africa) 1995	Did not qualify								3rd	2	0	0	2	15	38
(Wales) 1999	Did not qualify								P/O	8	4	0	4	131	221
(Australia) 2003	Pool Stage	4	0	0	4	46	200	Squad	2nd	2	1	0	1	31	76
(France) 2007	Pool Stage	4	1	0	3	50	111	Squad	P/O	14	10	1	3	426	182
(New Zealand) 2011	Pool Stage	4	1	0	3	48	90	Squad	1st	10	8	1	1	326	132
(England) 2015	Pool Stage	4	2	0	2	53	123	Squad	1st	10	9	1	0	286	106
(Japan) 2019	Pool Stage	4	1	0	3	65	122	Squad	Automatically qualified						
(France) 2023	Pool Stage	4	0	1	3	64	113	Squad	1st	10	9	1	0	325	146
(Australia) 2027	Qualified								1st	5	5	0	0	301	72
(United States) 2031	To be determined								To be determined						
Total	—	24	5	1	18	326	759	—	—	61	46	4	11	1841	973
Champions; Runners–up; Third place; Fourth place; Home venue

=== 2026 World Rugby Nations Cup ===
Georgia will compete in the 2026 World Rugby Nations Cup, an international tournament organised by World Rugby. The 2026 edition will feature four teams in a round-robin format.

Results correct up until 2025 22 November

Season	G	W	D	L	PF	PA	Pos
2026	0	0	0	0	0	0	–
Total	0	0	0	0	0	0	–

=== Other tournaments ===
Season	G	W	D	L	PF	PA	Pts	Pos
FIRA 1992–94	3	2	1	0	60	34	8	1st
1995 Rugby World Cup qualification	2	0	0	2	15	38	2	3nd
FIRA 1995–96	4	3	0	1	40	61	10	2nd
FIRA 1996–97	4	2	0	2	87	84	6	4nd
1999 Rugby World Cup qualification	4	3	0	1	74	60	10	2nd
1999 RWC qualification playoff	2	1	0	1	34	64	—N/a	DNQ

=== Rugby European Championships ===
Georgia compete annually in the Rugby Europe Championship (previously named European Nations Cup). They have won the tournament 17 times in 2001, 2008, 2009, 2011, 2012, 2013, 2014, 2015, 2016, 2018, 2019, 2020, 2021, 2022, 2023, 2024 and 2025. Since 2017 they have won eight consecutive titles and are unbeaten, with a single draw the only mark on their record in that time.

ENC champions

Results correct up until 2 March 2025

Season	G	W	D	L	PF	PA	Pos
2000	5	3	0	2	145	105	2nd
2001	5	5	0	0	167	68	1st
2002	5	3	1	1	184	84	2nd
2003–04	10	5	1	4	193	148	3rd
2005–06	10	8	0	2	353	125	2nd
2007–08	10	9	0	1	292	114	1st
2009–2010	10	8	1	1	328	130	1st
2011–2012	10	9	0	1	316	83	1st
2013–2014	10	9	1	0	286	106	1st
2015–2016	10	10	0	0	346	75	1st
2017	5	4	0	1	136	44	2nd
2018	5	5	0	0	188	35	1st
2019	5	5	0	0	162	34	1st
2020	5	5	0	0	197	60	1st
2021	5	5	0	0	153	73	1st
2022	5	4	1	0	172	73	1st
2023	5	5	0	0	225	41	1st
2024	5	5	0	0	176	82	1st
2025	5	5	0	0	301	72	1st
2026	5	4	0	1	210	75	2nd
Total	135	116	5	14	4290	1538	–

=== Antim Cup ===
The Antim Cup is contested between Georgia and Romania each time the teams meet in a senior international match other than World Cup matches or qualifiers. The holder retains the cup unless the challenger wins the match, and there is no extra time in case of a draw. It is named after the Romanian Orthodox Metropolitan Anthim the Iberian, who came from Georgia.

== Players ==
=== Current squad ===
On 21 October, Georgia named a 34-player squad ahead of the 2026 World Rugby Nations Cup European-African-Asian Series.

Head Coach: (France) Pierre-Henry Broncan

- Caps updated: 14 November 2026 (after Georgia v Tonga)

Player	Position	Date of birth (age)	Caps	Club/province
Luka Goginava	Hooker	4 October 1996 (age 30)	8	(France) Béziers
Vakhtang Jincharadze	Hooker	8 November 1999 (age 27)	4	(Georgia (country)) Black Lion
Vano Karkadze	Hooker	25 June 2000 (age 26)	28	(France) Oyonnax
Sergo Abramishvili	Prop	23 November 2003 (age 22)	4	(France) Stade Français Paris
Nika Abuladze	Prop	29 October 1995 (age 31)	25	(England) Exeter Chiefs
Giorgi Akhaladze	Prop	13 April 1999 (age 27)	23	(France) ASM Clermont
Kakhaber Darbaidze	Prop	20 May 2000 (age 26)	0	(France) Biarritz
Beka Gigashvili	Prop	17 February 1992 (age 34)	49	(France) Toulon
Giorgi Melikidze	Prop	29 June 1996 (age 30)	26	(France) Stade Français Paris
Lasha Phkhakadze	Prop	12 July 2003 (age 23)	0	(France) Bordeaux Bègles
Bachuki Tchumbadze	Prop	29 November 2001 (age 24)	9	(England) Exeter Chiefs
Mikheil Babunashvili	Lock	31 May 1996 (age 30)	30	(Georgia (country)) Black Lion
Lado Chachanidze	Lock	14 March 2000 (age 26)	37	(Georgia (country)) Black Lion
Giorgi Javakhia	Lock	24 September 1996 (age 30)	38	(France) Soyaux-Angoulême
Gagi Margvelashvili	Lock	12 May 2005 (age 21)	2	(France) Racing 92
Kote Mikautadze	Lock	1 July 1991 (age 35)	88	(France) Brive
Luka Ivanishvili	Back row	25 November 2001 (age 24)	32	(England) Bristol Bears
Tornike Jalagonia	Back row	12 December 1998 (age 27)	52	(France) Provence
Beka Gorgadze	Back row	8 February 1998 (age 28)	53	(France) Pau
Beka Saghinadze	Back row	29 October 1998 (age 28)	53	(France) Lyon
Mikheil Shioshvili	Back row	6 February 2006 (age 20)	3	(France) Toulon
Beka Shvangiradze	Back row	12 June 2002 (age 24)	11	(France) Lyon
Ilia Spanderashvili	Back row	10 September 1997 (age 29)	21	(France) Valence Romans
Gela Aprasidze	Scrum-half	14 January 1998 (age 28)	65	(France) Soyaux-Angoulême
Temur Dzodzuashvili	Scrum-half	24 November 2006 (age 19)	0	(Georgia (country)) Black Lion
Vasil Lobzhanidze	Scrum-half	14 October 1996 (age 30)	109	(France) Oyonnax
Luka Matkava	Fly-half	5 October 2001 (age 25)	42	(France) Oyonnax
Dachi Papunashvili	Fly-half	20 October 2001 (age 25)	6	(France) Montauban
Davit Barbakadze	Centre	2 August 2006 (age 20)	0	(France) Lyon
Tornike Kakhoidze	Centre	16 August 2003 (age 23)	22	(Georgia (country)) Black Lion
Giorgi Khaindrava	Centre	22 February 2005 (age 21)	2	(France) Nice
Giorgi Shvelidze	Centre	26 October 2003 (age 23)	11	(France) Brive
Luka Tabatadze	Centre	7 May 2007 (age 19)	2	(Georgia (country)) Black Lion
Otar Metreveli	Wing	12 September 2004 (age 22)	0	(Georgia (country)) Black Lion
Luka Khorbaladze	Wing	10 March 2004 (age 22)	0	(France) Lyon
Akaki Tabutsadze	Wing	19 August 1997 (age 29)	63	(Georgia (country)) Black Lion
Davit Niniashvili	Fullback	14 July 2002 (age 24)	49	(France) La Rochelle
Luka Tsirekidze	Fullback	25 August 2004 (age 22)	4	(Georgia (country)) Black Lion

=== Notable former players ===
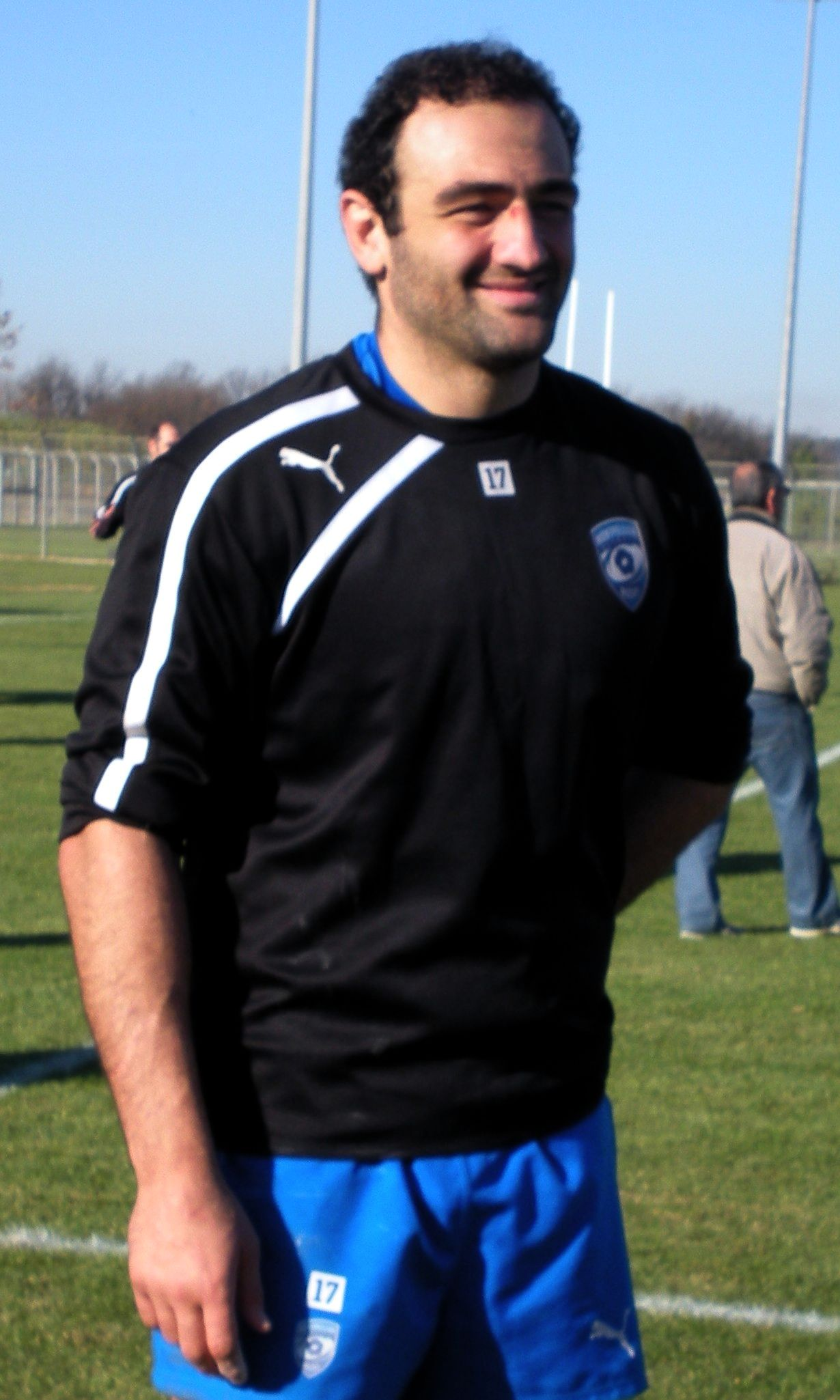
Mamuka Gorgodze

Mamuka Gorgodze – Switched to rugby from basketball aged 17. His first club was Lelo in the Georgian Top League, he was soon selected for the Georgia national team and made his debut in 2003 against Spain, at the age of just 18 and not long after he started playing rugby. However he was not selected for Georgia's first appearance at the 2003 Rugby World Cup later that year. In 2004 he became a regular fixture for the Georgia side. He was selected for the 2007 Rugby World Cup, and started three of Georgia's four matches at the World Cup, being one of Georgia's star players. Gorgodze became a success as flanker during this season, and halfway through the season French newspaper L'Équipe commented that he had improved his technique and become a mobile and unstoppable player. Gorgodze played a big role in Montpellier finishing the 2010–11 Top 14 season as runners up. At the end of the season L'Équipe named him as the best foreigner in the league. He was selected for the Georgia squad for the 2011 Rugby World Cup and played all the Georgia matches, being named man of the match in two matches, against England and Romania.

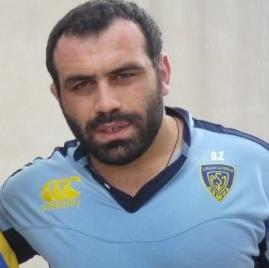
Davit Zirakashvili

Davit Zirakashvili – Originally came from a wrestling background, but switched to rugby in 2000. He moved to France in 2002 to play with Fédérale 1 side Aubenas. He moved up the leagues to the Top 14 in the 2004/05 season to play with Clermont where he joined his Georgian compatriot Goderdzi Shvelidze. He made his debut for Georgia in 2004 against Uruguay. He soon became an important member of both the Clermont and Georgia side. He played in all four of the consecutive Top 14 finals Clermont reached between 2007 and 2010, he scored a try in the 2008 Top 14 final against Toulouse and in 2010 became the first Georgian player to win the Top 14, and represented Georgia in the 2007, 2011 and 2015 World Cups. In 2010, Zirakashvili was voted Georgian sportsman of the year after some crucial performances for both club and country. He was part of a Georgian scrum which scored three penalty tries and also a pushover try in the calendar year, he also a memorable solo try from 45 metres out against Russia in Trabzon and an important try against Canada. His scrummaging was a key factor in Georgia recording wins against both Canada and USA for the first time, whilst at club level he was part of Clermont's Top 14 winning side. Zirakashvili was also mentioned as one of the best tighthead props of the year in world rugby by The Daily Telegraph.

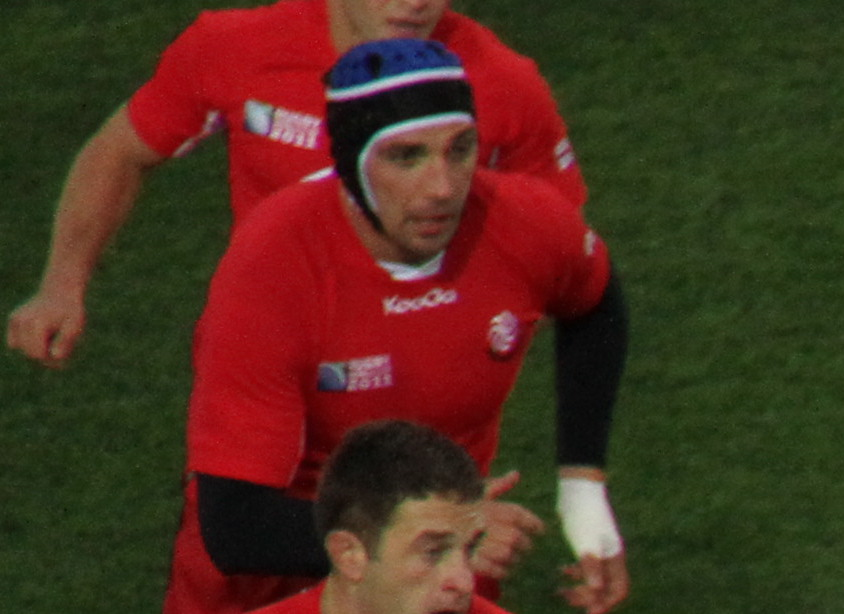
Ilia Zedginidze

Ilia Zedginidze – Played as a Number 8 and was a lineout specialist. A member of their inaugural World Cup side in 2003, he captained Georgia in the 2007 tournament, but was forced out of the squad because of an injury. This injury ultimately led to him announcing his retirement from international rugby, after gaining 48 caps. He returned to the squad in late 2008, playing against Scotland A and taking part in the 2009 European Nations Cup, where he scored a game-saving try against Portugal on 14 February 2009.

Malkhaz Urjukashvili – Moved to France, where he played for over a decade. He was one of the best players and scorers for Georgia, currently holding 65 caps for his National Team, with 18 tries and 300 points. His first match was a 29–15 win over Croatia, in Tbilisi, at 12 October 1997, aged only 17 years old. This made him one of the youngest players ever to be capped at international rugby level. He was present at the 2003 Rugby World Cup, playing three matches and scoring 9 points. In the game against England, he kicked a long range penalty that registered as Georgia's first Rugby World Cup points (England eventually won the game 84–6). He was called up once again for the 2007 Rugby World Cup, playing in all the four matches and scoring one conversion. He continued to be a valuable player in the 2011 Rugby World Cup qualification, the third Georgia gained in a row.

=== Award winners ===
The following Georgia players have been recognised at the World Rugby Awards since 2001:

World Rugby Breakthrough Player of the Year
Year	Nominees	Winners
2015	Vasil Lobzhanidze	—

== Player records ==
=== Most caps ===
#	Player	Pos	Span	Mat	Start	Sub	Won	Lost	Draw	%
1	Davit Kacharava	Centre	2006–2020	122	104	18	79	40	3	65.98
1	Alexander Todua	Wing	2008–2025	122	109	13	76	43	3	62.30
3	Merab Kvirikashvili	Fullback	2003–2018	115	94	21	72	40	3	63.91
4	Vasil Lobzhanidze	Scrum-half	2015-	110	92	18	70	37	3	63.64
5	Shalva Mamukashvili	Hooker	2011–2023	103	64	39	65	35	3	64.45
5	Merab Sharikadze	Centre	2012–2024	103	101	2	65	33	5	62.82
7	Giorgi Chkhaidze	Flanker	2002–2017	100	78	22	65	32	3	66.50
7	Lasha Malaghuradze	Fly-half	2008–2023	100	52	48	68	30	2	68.68
9	Lasha Khmaladze	Centre	2008–2023	97	73	24	63	30	3	66.66
10	Giorgi Nemsadze	Lock	2005–2019	95	71	24	62	32	1	65.78

Last updated: Georgia vs United States, 21 November 2026. Statistics include officially capped matches only.

=== Most tries ===
#	Player	Pos	Span	Mat	Start	Sub	Pts	Tries
1	Aka Tabutsadze	Wing	2020–	66	66	0	290	58
2	Mamuka Gorgodze	Lock	2003–2019	75	69	6	135	27
3	Davit Kacharava	Centre	2006–2020	122	104	18	125	25
4	Irakli Machkhaneli	Wing	2002–2014	73	68	5	115	23
4	Tedo Zibzibadze	Centre	2000–2014	77	65	12	115	23
6	Vasil Lobzhanidze	Scrum-half	2015–	110	92	18	103	20
6	Alexander Todua	Wing	2008–2025	122	109	13	100	20
8	Merab Sharikadze	Centre	2012–2024	103	101	2	95	19
9	Merab Kvirikashvili	Fullback	2003–2018	115	94	21	840	17
9	Malkhaz Urjukashvili	Wing	1997–2011	70	66	4	320	17

Last updated: Georgia vs United States, 21 November 2026. Statistics include officially capped matches only.

=== Most points ===
#	Player	Pos	Span	Mat	Pts	Tries	Conv	Pens	Drop
1	Merab Kvirikashvili	Fullback	2003–2018	115	840	17	148	150	3
2	Tedo Abzhandadze	Fly-half	2018–	66	391	6	98	55	0
3	Luka Matkava	Fly-half	2022–	42	333	8	101	29	0
4	Pavle Jimsheladze	Fly-half	1995–2007	57	320	9	61	48	3
4	Malkhaz Urjukashvili	Wing	1997–2011	70	320	17	47	46	1
6	Aka Tabutsadze	Wing	2020–	66	290	58	0	0	0
7	Lasha Malaghuradze	Fly-half	2008–2023	100	190	6	38	25	3
8	Soso Matiashvili	Full-back	2017–2021	32	159	8	25	23	0
9	Mamuka Gorgodze	Lock	2003–2019	75	135	27	0	0	0
10	Davit Kacharava	Centre	2006–2020	122	125	25	0	0	0

Last updated: Georgia vs United States, 21 November 2026. Statistics include officially capped matches only.

=== Most matches as captain ===
#	Player	Pos	Span	Mat	Won	Lost	Draw	%	Pts	Tries
1	Merab Sharikadze	Centre	2014–2024	52	32	17	3	57.14	50	10
2	Irakli Abuseridze	Scrum-half	2007–2012	36	25	10	1	70.83	15	3
3	Ilia Zedginidze	Lock	2002–2011	35	19	14	2	57.14	30	6
4	Irakli Machkhaneli	Wing	2013–2014	14	10	3	1	75.00	10	2
4	Shalva Sutiashvili	Flanker	2014–2016	14	13	0	1	96.42	5	1
6	Mamuka Gorgodze	Flanker	2013–2017	13	5	8	0	38.46	10	2
7	Zurab Mtchedlishvili	Lock	1997–2007	12	7	5	0	58.33	10	2
7	Levan Tsabadze	Prop	2001–2002	12	9	2	1	79.16	15	3
9	Giorgi Nemsadze	Lock	2018–2019	11	9	2	0	81.81	0	0
9	Dimitri Oboladze	Flanker	1993–1998	11	6	4	1	59.09	5	1

Last updated: Georgia vs Spain, 16 March 2025. Statistics include officially capped matches only.

=== Most points in a match ===
#	Player	Pos	Pts	Tries	Conv	Pens	Drop	Opposition	Venue	Date
1	Soso Matiashvili	Full Back	34	2	6	4	0	Canada	(Georgia (country)) Tbilisi	2017-10-11
2	Merab Kvirikashvili	Full Back	32	2	11	0	0	Germany	(Georgia (country)) Tbilisi	2010-02-06
3	Luka Matkava	Fly-half	26	2	8	0	0	Netherlands	(Netherlands) Amsterdam	2023-02-15
4	Luka Matkava	Fly-half	25	1	10	0	0	Germany	(Georgia (country)) Tbilisi	2023-02-05
5	Merab Kvirikashvili	Full Back	24	1	2	5	0	Portugal	(Portugal) Lisbon	2014-02-08
6	Paliko Jimsheladze	Fly-half	23	1	0	6	0	Russia	(Russia) Krasnodar	2003-03-09
6	Merab Kvirikashvili	Fly-half	23	1	9	0	0	Czech Republic	(Georgia (country)) Tbilisi	2007-04-07
8	Merab Kvirikashvili	Fly-half	22	1	1	5	0	Japan	(Georgia (country)) Tbilisi	2012-11-17
9	Luka Matkava	Fly-half	21	1	8	0	0	Switzerland	(Georgia (country)) Tbilisi	2025-02-01
10	Malkhaz Urjukashvili	Fly-half	20	0	7	2	0	Czech Republic	(Georgia (country)) Kutaisi	2005-06-12
10	Lasha Malaghuradze	Fly-half	20	1	6	1	0	Spain	(Spain) Madrid	2009-02-28
10	Aka Tabutsadze	Wing	20	4	0	0	0	Belgium	(Georgia (country)) Kutaisi	2020-02-22
10	Tedo Abzhandadze	Fly-half	20	2	2	2	0	Italy	(Georgia (country)) Batumi	2022-07-10

Last updated: Netherlands vs Georgia, 15 February 2026. Statistics include officially capped matches only.

=== Most tries in a match ===
#	Player	Pos	Pts	Tries	Conv	Pens	Drop	Opposition	Venue	Date
1	Aka Tabutsadze	Wing	20	4	0	0	0	Belgium	(Georgia (country)) Kutaisi	2020-02-22
2	Paliko Jimsheladze	Wing	15	3	0	0	0	Bulgaria	(Bulgaria) Sofia	1995-03-23
2	Archil Kavtarahvili	Wing	15	3	0	0	0	Bulgaria	(Bulgaria) Sofia	1995-03-23
2	Mamuka Gorgodze	Number 8	15	3	0	0	0	Czech Republic	(Georgia (country)) Kutaisi	2005-06-12
2	David Dadunashvili	Hooker	15	3	0	0	0	Czech Republic	(Georgia (country)) Tbilisi	2007-04-07
2	Malkhaz Urjukashvili	Centre	15	3	0	0	0	Czech Republic	(Georgia (country)) Tbilisi	2007-04-07
2	Mamuka Gorgodze	Number 8	15	3	0	0	0	Spain	(Georgia (country)) Tbilisi	2008-04-26
2	Zurab Zhvania	Hooker	15	3	0	0	0	Germany	(Germany) Heusenstamm	2015-02-07
2	Giorgi Kveseladze	Centre	15	3	0	0	0	Germany	(Germany) Offenbach	2018-02-17
2	Davit Niniashvili	Fullback	15	3	0	0	0	Netherlands	(Georgia (country)) Telavi	2021-06-26
2	Otar Giorgadze	Flanker	15	3	0	0	0	Netherlands	(Netherlands) Amsterdam	2022-02-12
2	Beka Gorgadze	Flanker	15	3	0	0	0	Uruguay	(Georgia (country)) Tbilisi	2022-11-06
2	Aka Tabutsadze	Wing	15	3	0	0	0	Germany	(Georgia (country)) Tbilisi	2023-02-05
2	Giorgi Tsutskiridze	Flanker	15	3	0	0	0	Germany	(Georgia (country)) Tbilisi	2023-02-05
2	Aka Tabutsadze	Wing	15	3	0	0	0	Romania	(Georgia (country)) Tbilisi	2024-03-02
2	Davit Niniashvili	Fullback	15	3	0	0	0	Spain	(Spain) Madrid	2025-02-16
2	Vano Karkadze	Hooker	15	3	0	0	0	Spain	(Georgia (country)) Tbilisi	2025-03-16
2	Aka Tabutsadze	Wing	15	3	0	0	0	Spain	(Georgia (country)) Tbilisi	2025-03-16
2	Shalva Aptsiauri	Wing	15	3	0	0	0	Canada	(Georgia (country)) Batumi	2025-11-15

Last updated: Georgia vs Canada, 15 November 2025. Statistics include officially capped matches only.

== Coaches ==
=== Current coaching staff ===
Correct as of 1 Nov 2026

Position	Name
Head coach	(France) Pierre-Henry Broncan
Assistant coach	(Italy) Marco Bortolami
Assistant coach	(Georgia (country)) Paliko Jimsheladze
Assistant coach	(New Zealand) Jerome Kaino
Assistant coach	(Georgia (country)) Vasil Kakovin
Skills coach	(Georgia (country)) Merab Kvirikashvili
Scrum coach	(Georgia (country)) Mikheil Nariashvili
Strength & conditioning coach	(Georgia (country)) Davit Nemsadzee
Strength & conditioning coach	(Georgia (country)) Archil Bezhiashvilii
Strength & conditioning coach	(England) Joe Worsley

=== Coaching history ===
Years	Coach
1989–1990	(Georgia (country)) David Kilasonia
1991–1993	(Georgia (country)) Temur Bendiashvili
1994–1996	(Georgia (country)) Guram Modebadze
1997	(New Zealand) Ross Meurant
1997–2003	(France) Claude Saurel
2004–2007	(Georgia (country)) Malkhaz Cheishvili
2008–2009	(Australia) Tim Lane
2010–2011	(Scotland) Richie Dixon
2012–2019	(New Zealand) Milton Haig
2020–2023	(Georgia (country)) Levan Maisashvili
2024–2025	(England) Richard Cockerill
2026	(Italy) Marco Bortolami (Interim)
2026–	(France) Pierre-Henry Broncan

== See also ==
- Rugby union in Georgia
- Georgia women's national rugby union team
- Georgia U20
- Georgia U18
- Georgia XV
- Georgia 7s
- Georgia women's 7s
- Antim Cup
- Soviet Union national rugby union team
- List of Georgia national rugby union players
