= Archil Kavtarashvili =

Georgia international rugby union player

- Born: 16 March 1973 (age 53) Tbilisi, Georgia, USSR
- Height: 6 ft 1 in (185 cm)
- Weight: 210 lb (95 kg)

Rugby union career
- Position: Wing
International career
| Years | Team | Apps | (Points) |
| 1994–2003 | Georgia | 21 | (50) |

Archil Kavtarashvili (born 16 March 1973) is a Georgian former rugby union international player.

Born in Tbilisi, Kavtarashvili was a speedy winger who could run the 100 metres in 10.8 seconds.

Kavtarashvili played rugby union in Italy for Rovigo and was the club's first recruit to come out of the former USSR, once scoring six tries in a 1997 Italian Cup match against Parma.

Capped in 21 Tests for Georgia, Kavtarashvili's international career included a hat-trick against Bulgaria and two matches at the 2003 Rugby World Cup in Australia, which were his final outings for the national side.

== See also ==
- List of Georgia national rugby union players
