= 2004–2006 European Nations Cup First Division =

2004–06 European Nations Cup First Division
- Date: 20 November 2004 – 10 June 2006
- Countries: Czech Republic; Georgia; Portugal; Romania; Russia; Ukraine

Final positions
- Champions: Romania
- Antim Cup: Georgia (2005); Romania (2006)

Tournament statistics
- Matches played: 30

The 2004–06 European Nations Cup doubled up as an element of qualification for the Rugby World Cup 2007. Ukraine replaced Spain as Champions of Division 2A. Romania and Georgia finished level on points, but Romania won the title on points difference; reigning champions Portugal finished in third place.

== Table ==
| Place | Nation | Games | | | | Points | | | Table points |
| Place | Nation | Played | Won | Drawn | Lost | For | Against | Difference | Table points |
|---|---|---|---|---|---|---|---|---|---|
| 1 | Romania | 10 | 8 | 0 | 2 | 389 | 94 | +295 | 26 |
| 2 | Georgia | 10 | 8 | 0 | 2 | 353 | 125 | +228 | 26 |
| 3 | Portugal | 10 | 6 | 1 | 3 | 193 | 183 | +10 | 23 |
| 4 | Russia | 10 | 4 | 1 | 5 | 290 | 202 | +88 | 19 |
| 5 | Czech Republic | 10 | 3 | 0 | 7 | 164 | 306 | −142 | 16 |
| 6 | Ukraine | 10 | 0 | 0 | 10 | 77 | 556 | −479 | 10 |

== Results ==
=== 2004–05 ===
20 November 2004

| Russia | 15–27 | Georgia |

Krasnodar

20 November 2004

| Ukraine | 16–36 | Portugal |

Odesa

27 November 2004

| Czech Republic | 13–38 | Romania |

Prague
Attendance: 2,500

5 February 2005

| Portugal | 18–14 | Georgia |

Lisbon

26 February 2005

| Romania | 33–10 | Russia |

Timișoara

26 February 2005

| Portugal | 19–13 | Czech Republic |

Lisbon

26 February 2005

| Georgia | 65–0 | Ukraine |

Tbilisi

12 March 2005

| Czech Republic | 42–15 | Ukraine |

Prague

12 March 2005

| Georgia | 20–13 | Romania |

Tbilisi

19 March 2005

| Czech Republic | 11–7 | Russia |

Prague

19 March 2005

| Romania | 97–0 | Ukraine |

Bucharest
Attendance: 1,000

4 June 2005

| Russia | 16–18 | Portugal |

Krasnoyarsk

11 June 2005

| Russia | 72–0 | Ukraine |

Moscow

11 June 2005

| Romania | 14–10 | Portugal |

Bucharest

12 June 2005

| Georgia | 75–10 | Czech Republic |

Kutaisi
Attendance: 7,000

=== 2005–06 ===
5 November 2005

| Ukraine | 8–47 | Czech Republic |

Odesa

12 November 2005

| Russia | 52–12 | Czech Republic |

Krasnodar

4 February 2006

| Georgia | 46–19 | Russia |

Tbilisi

25 February 2006

| Romania | 35–10 | Georgia |

Bucharest

25 February 2006

| Portugal | 19–19 | Russia |

Lisbon

11 March 2006

| Romania | 50–3 | Czech Republic |

La Teste-de-Buch

11 March 2006

| Georgia | 40–0 | Portugal |

Tbilisi

18 March 2006

| Portugal | 3–27 | Romania |

Lisbon

29 April 2006

| Ukraine | 12–32 | Georgia |

Odesa

13 May 2006

| Portugal | 52–14 | Ukraine |

Lisbon

20 May 2006

| Czech Republic | 10–18 | Portugal |

Prague

27 May 2006

| Ukraine | 12–55 | Russia |

Kharkiv

3 June 2006

| Ukraine | 0–58 | Romania |

Kyiv

10 June 2006

| Czech Republic | 3–24 | Georgia |

Prague

10 June 2006

| Russia | 25–24 | Romania |

Krasnoyarsk
