= Giorgi Javakhia =

Georgian rugby player (born 1996)

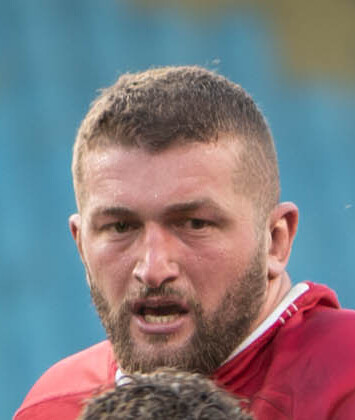
- Born: 24 September 1996 (age 30) Tbilisi, Georgia
- Height: 1.94 m (6 ft 4 in)
- Weight: 126 kg (19 st 12 lb)

Rugby union career
- Position: Lock
Senior career
Years	Team	Apps	(Points)
2016-2018	Lyon OU	4	(0)
2018-2023	Aurillac	85	(35)
2023-2025	Grenoble	24	(40)
2025-2026	RC Toulon	12	(0)
2026-	Soyaux Angoulême XV Charente		
- Correct as of 3 July 2024
International career
Years	Team	Apps	(Points)
2014-2015	Georgia U18	11	(15)
2015-2016	Georgia U20	7	(10)
2019-	Georgia	27	(20)
- Correct as of 3 July 2024

Giorgi Javakhia (born September 24, 1996) is a Georgian rugby union player. His position is flanker, and he currently plays for Grenoble in the Pro D2 and the Georgia national rugby union team.

== Biography ==
Biography Giorgi Javakhia joined the Lyon OU youth academy in 2015.

In April 2016, at just 19 years old, he played his first professional match in the Pro D2 with his former club. In 2018, he joined Stade Aurillacois. In February 2019, at 22, he played his first international match in the European Championship with Georgia. Giorgi Javakhia then signed with FC Grenoble starting the 2023–2024 season, where FCG was once again a Pro D2 finalist and faced RC Vannes. He started in this final. Like the previous year, Grenoble were beaten at the gates of the Top 14, by a score of 16 to 9. In the play-off for promotion to the first division, he was a substitute and FCG faced Montpellier HR, but for the second consecutive year, his club missed out on promotion in the play-off, losing 18–20 with three minutes remaining.

In 2024–2025, having finished first in the regular season, his club won the semi-final at home against Provence Rugby (38–17), then lost in the final to US Montauban (19–24)[9]. Giorgi Javakhia and FCG then narrowly lost again (11–13) with three minutes remaining in the promotion play-off on June 14, 2025, against Perpignan. He was selected for the Pro D2 XV of the season.
