= 1999 Rugby World Cup – repechage qualification =

In the 1999 Rugby World Cup qualifiers, there were two repechage positions available to qualify for the final tournament. Seven teams qualified for the repechage, three representing Europe and one each from Africa, Asia, Americas, and Oceania.

The teams were split into two groups and played a knockout format in each group with the African team given a bye into the second round. The two group winners were Uruguay and Tonga who secured the final two berths at RWC 1999.

== Repechage 1 ==
=== Bracket ===
Semifinal
Tonga	37	27	64
Georgia	6	28	34
Netherlands	31	14	45
South Korea	30	78	108

Final
Tonga	58	82	140
South Korea	26	15	41

=== Semi-finals ===
Team 1	Agg.	Team 2	1st leg	2nd leg
Tonga	64–34	Georgia	37–6	27–28
Netherlands	45–108	South Korea	31–30	14–78

6 March 1999

Tonga	37–6	Georgia

Nukuʻalofa, Tonga

14 March 1999

Netherlands	31–30	South Korea

Amsterdam, Netherlands

28 March 1999

Georgia	28–27	Tonga

Tbilisi, Georgia

4 April 1999

South Korea	78–14	Netherlands

Seoul, South Korea

=== Final ===
Team 1	Agg.	Team 2	1st leg	2nd leg 37–6
Tonga	140–41	South Korea	58–26	82–15

16 April 1999

Tonga	58–26	South Korea

Nukuʻalofa, Tonga

4 May 1999

South Korea	15–82	Tonga

Seoul, South Korea

- Tonga qualified for the 1999 Rugby World Cup.

== Repechage 2 ==
=== Bracket ===
Semifinal
Uruguay	46	33	79
Portugal	9	24	33
Morocco
bye

Final
Uruguay	18	18	36
Morocco	3	21	24

=== Semi-final ===
Team 1	Agg.	Team 2	1st leg	2nd leg
Uruguay	79–33	Portugal	46–9	33–24
Morocco	Bye	–	–	–

13 March 1999

Uruguay	46–9	Portugal

Montevideo, Uruguay

3 April 1999

Portugal	24–33	Uruguay

Lisbon, Portugal

=== Final ===
Team 1	Agg.	Team 2	1st leg	2nd leg
Uruguay	36–24	Morocco	18–3	18–21

18 April 1999

Uruguay	18–3	Morocco

Montevideo, Uruguay

1 May 1999

Morocco	21–18	Uruguay

Casablanca, Morocco

- Uruguay qualified for the 1999 Rugby World Cup.
