= Ilia Zedginidze =

Georgia international rugby union player

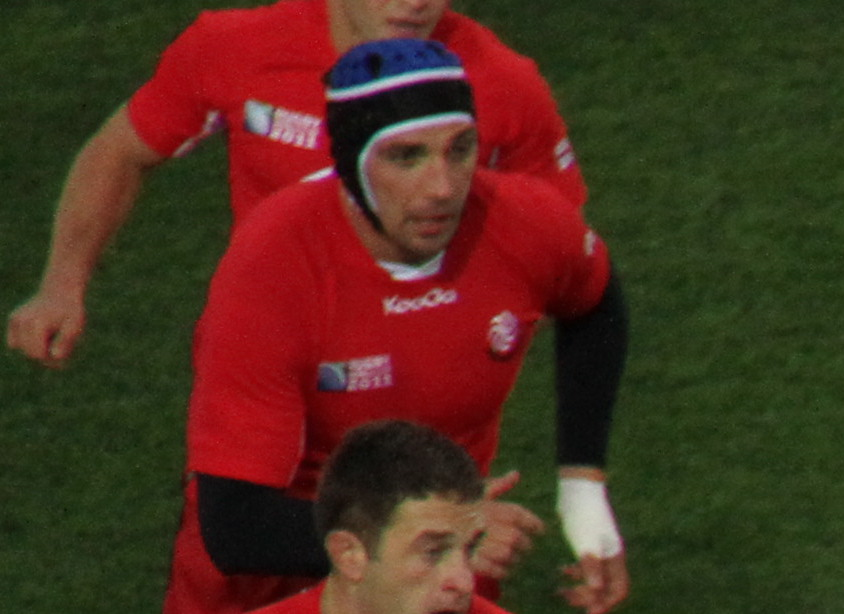
- Zedginidze vs England at the 2011 Rugby World Cup
- Born: 20 January 1977 (age 49) Tbilisi, Georgian SSR, Soviet Union
- Height: 1.95 m (6 ft 5 in)
- Weight: 109 kg (17 st 2 lb)

Rugby union career
- Position(s): Lock, Number 8, Flanker
Senior career
Years	Team	Apps	(Points)
- SO Chambéry
2000-2001	Béziers		
2001-2003	Toulon		
2003-2004	Rovigo		
2004-2005	Orléans		
2005-2006	Aix-en-Provence	19	(15)
2006-2007	Auch	9	(0)
2008-2009	Aix-en-Provence	9	(0)
2009-2011	Carqueiranne Hyères		
- Correct as of 30/10/2012
International career
Years	Team	Apps	(Points)
1998-2011	Georgia	64	(65)
- Correct as of 30/10/2012

Ilia Zedginidze (Georgian: ილია ზედგინიძე; born 20 January 1977) is a Georgian former rugby union player. He played as a lock (rugby union), number 8, and flanker (rugby union) and was a lineout specialist. A member of their inaugural World Cup side in 2003, he captained the Georgia national rugby union team in the 2007 tournament, but was forced out of the squad because of an injury. This injury ultimately led to his announcement of his retirement from international rugby, after gaining 48 caps. He returned to the squad in late 2008, playing against Scotland A and taking part in the 2009 European Nations Cup, where he scored a game-saving try against Portugal on 14 February 2009.

He played for Rugby Rovigo in Italy and for FC Auch Gers in France, who played in and won the 2006-07 Rugby Pro D2 season. He now represents Aix-en-Provence.
