= Sergo Abramishvili =

Georgian rugby union player

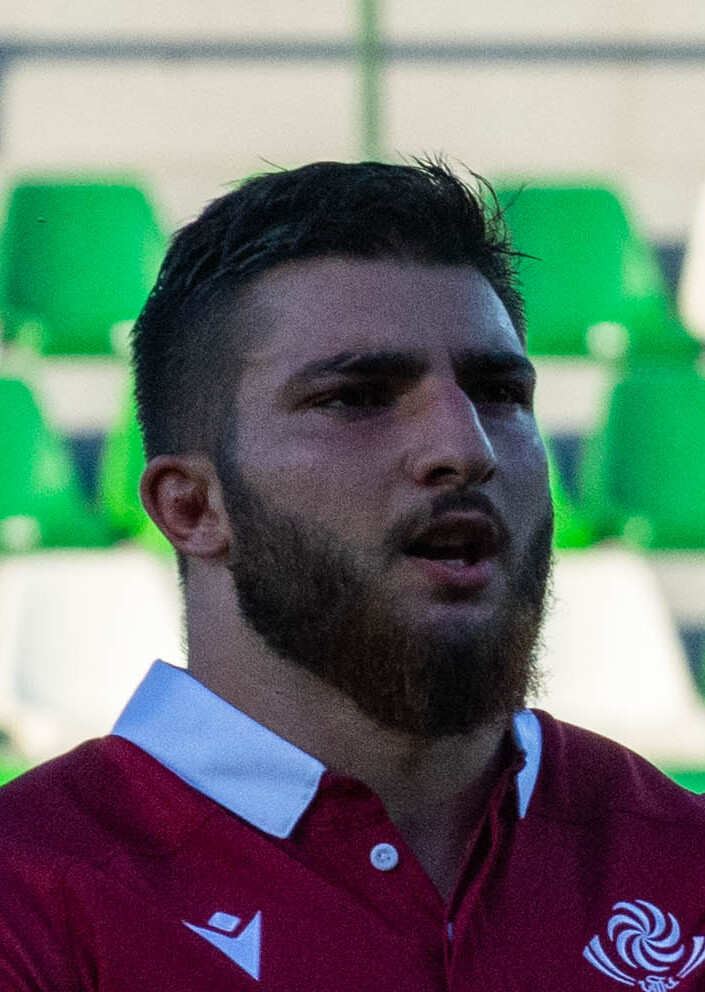
- Born: Sergo Abramishvili; 23 November 2003 (age 22) Georgia
- Height: 1.84 m (6 ft 1/2 in)
- Weight: 112 kg (17 st 9 lb)

Rugby union career
- Position: Prop
- Current team: Stade Français
Senior career
Years	Team	Apps	(Points)
2020–2021	Khvamli Tbilisi	10	(0)
2021–	Stade Français	35	(20)
- Correct as of 2 January 2024
International career
Years	Team	Apps	(Points)
2023	Georgia under-20	5	(0)
2023–	Georgia	3	(0)
- Correct as of 17 December 2023

Sergo Abramishvili (born 23 November 2003) is a Georgian rugby union player who plays as a prop both for Stade Français and internationally for Georgia.

== Career ==
=== Stade Français ===
He joined Stade Français Paris in 2021, playing for the Espoirs side. His debut came in June 2022 when he came off the bench in a 17–33 loss at Stade Jean Bouin against CA Brive. The following season he made his first start in the first round of the 2022–23 EPCR Challenge Cup, he played 60 minutes in a victory over Benetton. In January 2024 after a draw over Clermont Abramishvili was named in the Top14 team of the month.

After establishing himself as an important player in the Stade Français squad during the 2023–2024 season, which saw his club reach the semi-finals of the Top 14, Sergo Abramishvili is extending his contract with the Parisian club during the 2024–2025 season, until 2028.
