= 1995 Rugby World Cup – Oceania qualification =

For the 1995 Rugby World Cup in South Africa, the Oceania teams from Australia, New Zealand and Western Samoa were granted automatic entry due to reaching the quarter-final stages of the 1991 tournament.

Oceania was granted one further qualifying place, which was decided by a simple home and away play-off between Fiji and Tonga in 1993. Each team lost their home match, but Tonga won the play-off on aggregate score.

== Match results ==
Tonga qualified as Oceania 1 for the 1995 Rugby World Cup, winning 34–26 on aggregate.

12 June 1993

Fiji	11–24	Tonga

Suva Fiji

17 July 1993

Tonga	10–15	Fiji

Nuku'alofa, Tonga
