= Vano Karkadze =

Georgian rugby union player

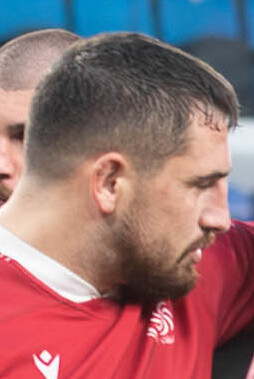
- Born: 25 June 2000 (age 26) Tbilisi, Georgia
- Height: 1.79 m (5 ft 10 in)
- Weight: 114 kg (251 lb; 17 st 13 lb)

Rugby union career
- Position: Hooker
- Current team: Montpellier
Senior career
| Years | Team | Apps | (Points) |
| 2018–2019 | Aurillac | 3 | (0) |
| 2019–2023 | Brive | 36 | (10) |
| 2023–2025 | Montpellier | 33 | (30) |
| 2025– | Oyonnax Rugby | 20 | (40) |
- Correct as of 2 March 2024
International career
| Years | Team | Apps | (Points) |
| 2018 | Georgia U18 | 5 | (5) |
| 2018–2019 | Georgia U20 | 5 | (5) |
| 2019– | Georgia | 11 | (10) |
- Correct as of 2 March 2024

Vano Karkadze (Georgian: ვანო კარკაძე; born 25 June 2000) is a Georgian professional rugby union player who plays as a hooker for Top 14 club Montpellier and the Georgia national team.

== Club career ==
A member of RC Aia, Vano Karkadze participates in the 2018 European Under-18 Rugby Union Championships with the Georgian selection. He notably scored a try in the victorious final against France. He was then spotted by the Stade Aurillacois, which integrated him into its academy, playing in Hopes. He signs a 3-year contract in favor of Aurillac.

During his season at Aurillac, he will make three appearances in Pro D2. At the end of the season, he was finally debauched by CA Brive, who signed him for two seasons with his academy, coached by his compatriot Goderdzi Shvelidze.

During the 2019–2020 season, he obtained playing time with the professionals in the Challenge Cup, and achieved his first scoresheet in the Top 14 against Aviron bayonnais. Before the 2020–2021 season, he injured himself (ruptured cruciate ligaments), and will be unavailable for several months.

== International career ==
During this season, he had his first selection for Georgia against Romania. He participated in the wake of the 2019 World Junior Rugby Union Championship. In September 2019, he joined the Georgian squad for the 2019 Rugby World Cup, where he will come into play against Uruguay.
