= 1995 Rugby World Cup – European qualification =

Tournament details
- Dates: 1 October 1992 – 12 October 1994
- No. of nations: 22

For the 1995 Rugby World Cup qualifiers, the European Federation was allocated three places in the final tournament. This was in addition to the four places granted to England, France, Ireland and Scotland based on their results from 1991.

Twenty two teams played in the European qualifiers that were held over three stages in 1993 and 1994. Wales, Italy and Romania were the top three sides and secured their places as Europe 1, Europe 2 and Europe 3, respectively, for RWC 95.

== Preliminary round ==
=== West Group ===
Switzerland qualify for Round 1.

Team	Played	Won	Drawn	Lost	For	Against	Difference	Points
Switzerland	2	1	0	1	17	8	+9	4
Denmark	2	1	0	1	8	6	+2	4
Andorra	2	1	0	1	3	14	−11	4
Luxembourg	0	0	0	0	0	0	0	0

Luxembourg withdrew from the group.

1 October 1992

Andorra	3–0	Denmark

Andorra La Vella, Andorra

29 October 1992

Denmark	8–3	Switzerland

Andorra La Vella, Andorra

31 October 1992

Andorra	0–14	Switzerland

Andorra La Vella, Andorra

=== Central Group ===
Israel qualify for Round 1.

Team	Played	Won	Drawn	Lost	For	Against	Difference	Points
Israel	1	1	0	0	67	8	+59	3
Hungary	1	0	0	1	8	67	−59	1
Yugoslavia	0	0	0	0	0	0	0	0

Yugoslavia was banned from the qualification process due to the political situation in the country at the time.

30 May 1993

Hungary	8–67	Israel

Budapest, Hungary

== Round 1 ==
Spain and Portugal qualify for Round 2.

=== West Group ===
Team	Played	Won	Drawn	Lost	For	Against	Difference	Points
Spain	3	3	0	0	144	21	+123	9
Portugal	3	2	0	1	55	40	+15	7
Belgium	3	1	0	2	51	78	−27	5
Switzerland	3	0	0	3	3	114	−111	3

11 May 1993

Spain	40–0	Switzerland

Lisbon, Portugal

11 May 1993

Portugal	8–3	Belgium

Lisbon, Portugal

13 May 1993

Spain	67–6	Belgium

Lisbon, Portugal

13 May 1993

Portugal	32–0	Switzerland

Lisbon, Portugal

15 May 1993

Belgium	42–3	Switzerland

Lisbon, Portugal

16 May 1993

Portugal	15–37	Spain

Lisbon, Portugal

=== Central Group ===
Netherlands and Czech Republic qualify for Round 2.

Team	Played	Won	Drawn	Lost	For	Against	Difference	Points
Netherlands	3	3	0	0	129	12	+117	9
Czech Republic	3	2	0	1	68	49	+19	7
Sweden	3	1	0	2	39	75	−36	5
Israel	3	0	0	3	10	110	−100	3

31 October 1993

Sweden	26–10	Israel

31 October 1993

Netherlands	42–6	Czech Republic

3 November 1993

Netherlands	56–0	Israel

3 November 1993

Czech Republic	34–7	Sweden

6 November 1993

Netherlands	31–6	Sweden

6 November 1993

Czech Republic	28–0	Israel

=== East Group A ===
Russia qualify for Round 2.

Team	Played	Won	Drawn	Lost	For	Against	Difference	Points
Russia	2	2	0	0	56	14	+42	6
Poland	2	1	0	1	28	47	−19	4
Georgia	2	0	0	2	15	38	−23	2

25 May 1993

Russia	15–9	Georgia

Sopot, Poland

27 May 1993

Poland	23–6	Georgia

Sopot, Poland

29 May 1993

Poland	5–41	Russia

Gdańsk, Poland

=== East Group B ===
Germany qualify for Round 2.

Team	Played	Won	Drawn	Lost	For	Against	Difference	Points
Germany	2	2	0	0	58	10	+48	6
Latvia	2	1	0	1	12	33	−21	4
Lithuania	2	0	0	2	11	38	−27	2

1 May 1993

Germany	31–5	Lithuania

Berlin, Germany

8 May 1993

Latvia	5–27	Germany

Riga, Latvia

29 May 1993

Lithuania	6–7	Latvia

Šiauliai, Lithuania

== Round 2 ==
Wales qualify for Round 3.

=== West Group ===
Team	Played	Won	Drawn	Lost	For	Against	Difference	Points
Wales	2	2	0	0	156	11	+145	6
Spain	2	1	0	1	35	73	−38	4
Portugal	2	0	0	2	30	137	−107	2

18 May 1994

Portugal	11–102	Wales
Try: Murinello; Pen: Vilar Gomes		Try: Walker (4); I. Evans (3); Hall (3); Jones (2); Taylor; Quinnell; Llewellyn; Penalty try Con: N. Jenkins (11)

Lisbon, Portugal
Referee: David Bishop (New Zealand)

21 May 1994

Spain	0–54	Wales
		Try: I. Evans (3); Quinnell; Walker; G. Jenkins; Penalty try Con: N. Jenkins (5); Pen: N. Jenkins (3)

Madrid, Spain
Referee: David Bishop (New Zealand)

28 May 1994

Spain	35–19	Portugal

Madrid, Spain

=== Central Group ===
Italy qualify for Round 3.

Team	Played	Won	Drawn	Lost	For	Against	Difference	Points
Italy	2	2	0	0	167	17	+150	6
Netherlands	2	1	0	1	44	72	−28	4
Czech Republic	2	0	0	2	17	139	−122	2

14 May 1994

Netherlands	38–9	Czech Republic

18 May 1994

Italy	104–8	Czech Republic

Viadana, Italy

21 May 1994

Italy	63–9	Netherlands

Calvisano, Italy

=== East Group ===
Romania qualify for Round 3.

Team	Played	Won	Drawn	Lost	For	Against	Difference	Points
Romania	2	2	0	0	90	6	+84	6
Russia	2	1	0	1	69	35	+34	4
Germany	2	0	0	2	11	129	−118	2

2 May 1994

Romania	60–6	Germany

Bucharest, Romania

4 May 1994

Russia	69–5	Germany

Bucharest, Romania

7 May 1994

Romania	30–0	Russia

Bucharest, Romania

== Round 3 ==
Wales, Italy and Romania qualify for RWC 1995 as Europe 1, Europe 2 and Europe 3, respectively.

Team	Played	Won	Drawn	Lost	For	Against	Difference	Points
Wales	2	2	0	0	45	28	+17	6
Italy	2	1	0	1	43	35	+8	4
Romania	2	0	0	2	15	40	−25	2

17 September 1994

Romania	9–16	Wales
Pen: Nichitean (3)		Try: I. Evans; Con: N. Jenkins; Pen: N. Jenkins (3)

Dinamo Stadium
Referee: David McHugh (Ireland)

1 October 1994

Italy	24–6	Romania

Catania, Italy

12 October 1994

Wales	29–19	Italy
Try: N. Davies; Pen: N. Jenkins (7); Drop: N. Jenkins		Try: Francescato; Con: Dominguez; Pen: Dominguez (4)

Cardiff, Wales
Referee: Ken McCartney (Scotland)
