= 2006–2008 European Nations Cup First Division =

2006–08 European Nations Cup First Division
- Date: 3 February 2007 – 10 May 2008
- Countries: Czech Republic; Georgia; Portugal; Romania; Russia; Spain

Final positions
- Champions: Georgia (2007, 2008)
- Antim Cup: Georgia (2007, 2008)

Tournament statistics
- Matches played: 30

The European Nations Cup (ENC) First Division is the sixth edition of the so-called Six Nations B, since its launch in 2000.

The ENC is played over two years during which all teams meet each other home and away. The games are usually played in February and March during the Six Nations Championship, and in May to avoid very cold conditions in Eastern Europe. However the winner of this does not get promoted to the Six Nations.

== Table ==
Pos	Team	Games				Points			Table Points
Pos	Team	Play	Won	Draw	Lost	For	Ag.	Diff.	Table Points
1	Georgia	10	9	0	1	292	114	+178	28
2	Russia	10	8	0	2	312	147	+165	26
3	Romania	10	6	0	4	277	144	+133	22
4	Spain	10	4	0	6	233	240	−7	18
5	Portugal	10	3	0	7	174	196	−22	16
6	Czech Republic	10	0	0	10	59	506	−447	10

== Season 2007 ==
3 February 2007

Romania	17–20	Georgia

Steaua, Bucharest

3 February 2007

Portugal	21–18	Spain

University, Lisbon

10 February 2007

Spain	14–39	Russia

Madrid

10 March 2007

Romania	50–14	Spain

Bucharest

17 March 2007

Czech Republic	13–46	Romania

Prague

17 March 2007

Spain	31–17	Georgia

Madrid

24 March 2007

Georgia	31–12	Russia

Tbilisi

7 April 2007

Georgia	98–3	Czech Republic

Tbilisi

21 April 2007

Russia	62–6	Czech Republic

Krasnodar

5 May 2007

Czech Republic	15–42	Spain

Prague

12 May 2007

Portugal	3–21	Russia

University, Lisbon

19 May 2007

Czech Republic	3–23	Portugal

Prague

3 November 2007

Spain	46–0	Czech Republic

Madrid

4 November 2007

Romania	12–22	Russia

Bucharest

17 November 2007

Portugal	8–23	Romania

Lisbon

== Season 2008 ==
2 February 2008

Georgia	31–3	Portugal

Tbilisi

9 February 2008

Georgia	22–7	Romania

Tbilisi

16 February 2008

Portugal	42–6	Czech Republic

Lisbon

23 February 2008

Spain	11–17	Romania

Madrid

23 February 2008

Portugal	6–11	Georgia

Lisbon

1 March 2008

Russia	41–26	Portugal

Krasnodar

8 March 2008

Romania	21–15	Portugal

Bucharest

8 March 2008

Russia	42–16	Spain

Krasnodar

15 March 2008

Russia	12–8	Romania

Krasnodar

22 March 2008

Romania	76–7	Czech Republic

Bucharest

29 March 2008

Czech Republic	3–22	Georgia

Praga

12 April 2008

Russia	12–18	Georgia

Krasnoyarsk

19 April 2008

Czech Republic	3–49	Russia

Praga

26 April 2008

Georgia	22–20	Spain

Tbilisi

10 May 2008

Spain	21–17	Portugal

Madrid

== See also ==
- 2006-2008 European Nations Cup Second Division
- 2006-2008 European Nations Cup Third Division
- Antim Cup
- FIRA – Association of European Rugby
- Six Nations Championship
