= 2009 in rugby union =

Here is the complete list of fixtures and results of test match rugby in 2009. All major international competitions, such as the Tri Nations and the Six Nations Championship, continue, as does the qualification process for the 2011 Rugby World Cup.

== International competitions ==
=== Worldwide ===
- 2008-09 IRB Sevens World Series — Winners: South Africa
- 2009 Rugby World Cup Sevens — Winners: Wales (men), Australia (women)
- 2009 IRB Junior World Championship — Winners: New Zealand
- 2009 IRB Junior World Rugby Trophy — Winner: Romania
- Nations Cup — Winners: Scotland A

=== Africa ===
- 2009 Tri Nations Series — Winners: South Africa
- 2009 Africa Cup
- 2009 Castel Beer Trophy
- 2011 Rugby World Cup - Africa qualification

=== Asia ===
- 2009 Asian Five Nations – Winner: Japan
- 2009 Asian Five Nations - Division One – Winner: Arabian Gulf
- 2009 Asian Five Nations - Division Two – Winner: Malaysia
- 2009 Asian Five Nations - Division Three – Winner: Philippines
- 2009 Asian Five Nations - Regional Divisions
  - Division 1: Laos
  - Division 2: Uzbekistan
- 2011 Rugby World Cup - Asia qualification

=== Europe ===
- 2009 Six Nations Championship — Winner: Ireland
- 2008-2010 European Nations Cup First Division- Winner: Georgia
- 2008-2010 European Nations Cup Division 2A - Winner: Ukraine
- 2008-2010 European Nations Cup Division 2B - Winner: Netherlands
- 2008-2010 European Nations Cup Division 3A - Winner: Lithuania
- 2008-2010 European Nations Cup Division 3B - Winner: Slovenia
- 2008-2010 European Nations Cup Division 3C - Winner: Israel
- 2008-2010 European Nations Cup Division 3D -Winner: Cyprus
- 2011 Rugby World Cup - Europe qualification

=== North America ===
- 2009 Churchill Cup - Ireland A
- 2011 Rugby World Cup - Americas qualification

=== Oceania ===
- 2009 Tri Nations Series — Winners: South Africa
- 2009 Pacific Nations Cup – Junior All Blacks
- 2011 Rugby World Cup - Oceania qualification

=== South America ===
- 2009 South American Rugby Championship "A"
- 2009 South American Rugby Championship "B"
- 2011 Rugby World Cup - Americas qualification

== Major club competitions ==
=== Europe ===
- Heineken Cup – Leinster (Ireland)
- European Challenge Cup – Northampton Saints (England)
- (England) Guinness Premiership – Leicester Tigers
  - National Division One – Leeds Carnegie, relegated from the Premiership the previous season, win the title and an immediate return to the Premiership. Leeds' place in what will become the RFU Championship in 2009–10 will be taken by Bristol, bottom finishers in the Premiership.
- (France) Top 14 – Perpignan
  - Rugby Pro D2 – Racing Métro win the championship and automatic promotion to the Top 14. Albi win the playoffs to determine the second promotion place. Their places in Pro D2 will be taken by the bottom two teams from Top 14, Dax and Mont-de-Marsan.
- (Ireland) (Scotland) (Wales) Celtic League – Munster (Ireland)
- (Italy) Super 10 – Benetton Treviso

=== Southern Hemisphere ===
- Super 14 – Bulls (South Africa)

==== Australia ====
- Shute Shield - Sydney University

==== New Zealand ====
- Air New Zealand Cup – Canterbury
- Heartland Championship – Lochore Cup - North Otago; Meads Cup - Whanganui
- Ranfurly Shield - Southland

==== South Africa ====
- Currie Cup – Blue Bulls

== International results ==
- Complete list of fixtures involving national teams during 2009.
- • - International Friendly (a fixture not affiliated to any international tournament.)
- ♦ - World Cup Qualifying matches.

=== January ===
Date
31-Jan-2009
Match
Monaco - Azerbaijan

Report

Venue
Menton (France)
Result
38-12

=== February ===
Date
Match

Venue
Result
7-Feb-2009
Germany - Georgia ♦

Report

Fritz-Grunebaum-Sportpark, Heidelberg (Germany)
5-38
7-Feb-2009
Spain - Romania ♦

Report

Estadio Universidad Complutense, Madrid (Spain)
10-19
7-Feb-2009
Portugal - Russia ♦

Report

Estádio Universitário, Lisbon (Portugal)
14-18
7-Feb-2009
England - Italy

Report

Twickenham, London (England)
36-11
7-Feb-2009
Ireland - France
Report
Croke Park, Dublin (Ireland)
30-21
8-Feb-2009
Scotland - Wales
Report
Murrayfield, Edinburgh (Scotland)
13-26
14-Feb-2009
Georgia - Portugal ♦

Report

Boris Paichadze Stadium, Tbilisi (Georgia)
20-20
14-Feb-2009
Germany - Romania ♦

Report

Fritz-Grunebaum-Sportpark, Heidelberg (Germany)
0-22
14-Feb-2009
France - Scotland
Report
Stade de France, Saint-Denis (France)
22-13
14-Feb-2009
Wales - England
Report
Millennium Stadium, Cardiff (Wales)
23-15
15-Feb-2009
Italy - Ireland

Report

Stadio Flaminio, Rome (Italy)
9-38
21-Feb-2009
Portugal - Germany ♦

Report

Estádio Universitário, Lisbon (Portugal)
44-6
27-Feb-2009
France - Wales

Report

Stade de France, Saint-Denis (France)
21-16
28-Feb-2009
Spain - Georgia ♦

Report

Estadio Universidad Complutense, Madrid (Spain)
11-55
28-Feb-2009
Romania - Russia ♦

Report

Stadionul Naţional de Rugby, Bucharest (Romania)
19-28
28-Feb-2009
Scotland - Italy

Report

Murrayfield, Edinburgh (Scotland)
26-6
28-Feb-2009
Ireland - England

Report

Croke Park, Dublin (Ireland)
14-13

=== March ===
Date
Match

Venue
Result
14-Mar-2009
Italy - Wales

Report

Stadio Flaminio, Rome (Italy)
15–20
14-Mar-2009
Scotland - Ireland

Report

Murrayfield, Edinburgh (Scotland)
15–22
14-Mar-2009
Georgia - Romania ♦

Report

Boris Paichadze Stadium, Tbilisi (Georgia)
28–23
14-Mar-2009
Switzerland - Andorra ♦

Report

Bern (Switzerland)
32–9
14-Mar-2009
Cyprus - Slovakia

Report

Limassol (Cyprus)
33–7
14-Mar-2009
Belgium - Czech Republic ♦

Report

Brussels (Belgium)
15–15
15-Mar-2009
England - France

Report

Twickenham, London (England)
34-10
15-Mar-2009
Portugal - Spain ♦

Report

Estádio Universitário, Lisbon (Portugal)
24-19
21-Mar-2009
Italy - France

Report

Stadio Flaminio, Rome (Italy)
8–50
21-Mar-2009
England - Scotland

Report

Twickenham, London (England)
26–12
21-Mar-2009
Wales - Ireland

Report

Millennium Stadium, Cardiff (Wales)
15–17
21-Mar-2009
Romania - Portugal ♦

Report

Stadionul Naţional de Rugby, Bucharest (Romania)
21–22
21-Mar-2009
Andorra - Armenia ♦

Report

Andorra la Vella (Andorra)
36–10
21-Mar-2009
Israel - Luxembourg ♦

Report

Wingate Institute, Netanya (Israel)
30–0
21-Mar-2009
Slovakia - Monaco

Report

Bratislava (Slovakia)
11–10
21-Mar-2009
Bosnia and Herzegovina - Cyprus

Report

Zenica (Bosnia and Herzegovina)
6–8
21-Mar-2009
Ukraine - Czech Republic ♦

Report

Odesa (Ukraine)
20–10
22-Mar-2009
Russia - Georgia ♦

Report

Illichivets Stadium, Mariupol (Ukraine)
21–29
22-Mar-2009
Laos - Brunei

Report

Savannakhet National Stadium, Vientiane (Laos)
28–8
25-Mar-2009
Cambodia - Brunei

Report

Savannakhet National Stadium, Vientiane (Laos)
10–21
28-Mar-2009
Laos - Cambodia

Report

Savannakhet National Stadium, Vientiane (Laos)
8–3

=== April ===
Date
Match

Venue
Result
4-Apr-2009
Latvia - Lithuania •

Report

Carnikava (Latvia)
12-55
4-Apr-2009
Switzerland - Serbia ♦

Report

Nyon (Switzerland)
6-12
8-Apr-2009
Chinese Taipei - Sri Lanka ♦

Report

The Sevens, Dubai (United Arab Emirates)
36–24
8-Apr-2009
Arabian Gulf - Thailand ♦

Report

The Sevens, Dubai (United Arab Emirates)
36–17
11-Apr-2009
Denmark - Norway ♦

Report

Odense (Denmark)
20-18
11-Apr-2009
Greece - Bulgaria ♦

Report

Alexandroupoli (Greece)
41-18
11-Apr-2009
Thailand - Sri Lanka

Report

The Sevens, Dubai (United Arab Emirates)
17–51
11-Apr-2009
Arabian Gulf - Chinese Taipei ♦

Report

The Sevens, Dubai (United Arab Emirates)
44–24
18-Apr-2009
Netherlands - Sweden ♦

Report

Amsterdam (Netherlands)
36-24
18-Apr-2009
Latvia - Malta ♦

Report

Riga (Latvia)
19-32
18-Apr-2009
Hungary - Austria ♦

Report

Esztergom (Hungary)
25-13
25-Apr-2009
Japan - Kazakhstan ♦

Report

Kintetsu Hanazono Rugby Stadium, Osaka (Japan)
87–10
25-Apr-2009
South Korea - Singapore ♦

Report

Tancheon Sports Complex, Seongnam (South Korea)
65–0
25-Apr-2009
Malta - Netherlands ♦

Report

Paola (Malta)
7-29
25-Apr-2009
Croatia - Latvia ♦

Report

Makarska (Croatia)
21-13
25-Apr-2009
Austria - Denmark ♦

Report

Linz (Austria)
6-27
25-Apr-2009
Slovenia - Norway ♦

Report

Ljubljana (Slovenia)
14-10
25-Apr-2009
Bulgaria - Finland ♦

Report

Pernik (Bulgaria)
29-10
25-Apr-2009
Luxembourg - Greece ♦

Report

Luxembourg (city) (Luxembourg)
14-17
25-Apr-2009
Chile - Brazil ♦

Report

TBA, Santiago (Chile)
79–3
25-Apr-2009
Uruguay - Paraguay

Report

Estadio Charrúa, Montevideo (Uruguay)
85–7
29-Apr-2009
Uruguay - Brazil ♦

Report

Estadio Charrúa, Montevideo (Uruguay)
71–3
29-Apr-2009
Chile - Paraguay

Report

Estadio Charrúa, Montevideo (Uruguay)
34–13

=== May ===
Date
Match

Venue
Result
2-May-2009
Hong Kong - Japan ♦

Report

Hong Kong Football Club Stadium (Hong Kong)
6–59
2-May-2009
Kazakhstan - South Korea ♦

Report

Central Stadium, Almaty (Kazakhstan)
30–27
2-May-2009
Brazil - Paraguay

Report

Estadio Charrúa, Montevideo (Uruguay)
36–21
2-May-2009
Uruguay - Chile ♦

Report

Estadio Charrúa, Montevideo (Uruguay)
46–9
2-May-2009
Croatia - Sweden ♦

Report

TBC (Croatia)
23–13
2-May-2009
Germany - Russia ♦

Report

TBC, Hanover (Germany)
0–53
2-May-2009
Lithuania - Serbia ♦

Report

TBC (Lithuania)
50–9
9-May-2009
Singapore - Kazakhstan ♦

Report

Yio Chu Kang Stadium (Singapore)
19–22
9-May-2009
South Korea - Hong Kong ♦

Report

Tancheon Sports Complex, Seongnam (South Korea)
36–34
9-May-2009
Armenia - Lithuania ♦

Report

TBC (Armenia)
19–24
9-May-2009
Ukraine - Moldova ♦

Report

Odesa (Ukraine)
32-0
9-May-2009
Israel - Slovenia ♦

Report

Israel
26-19
16-May-2009
Japan - South Korea ♦

Report

Kintetsu Hanazono Rugby Stadium, Osaka (Japan)
80–9
16-May-2009
Moldova - Poland ♦

Report

Chişinău (Moldova)
28–30
16-May-2009
Hong Kong - Singapore ♦

Report

Hong Kong Football Club Stadium (Hong Kong)
64–6
23-May-2009
Singapore - Japan ♦

Report

Yio Chu Kang Stadium (Singapore)
15–45
23-May-2009
Cambodia - Laos

Report

Phnom Penh (Cambodia)
24-8
23-May-2009
Israel - Lithuania ♦

Report

Israel
3–19
23-May-2009
Canada - Ireland •

Report

Thunderbird Stadium, Vancouver (Canada)
6–25
24-May-2009
Kazakhstan - Hong Kong ♦

Report

Central Stadium, Almaty (Kazakhstan)
25–6
30-May-2009
Poland - Belgium ♦

Report

Polonia Stadium, Warsaw (Poland)
14–3
30-May-2009
Canada - Wales •

Report

York Stadium, Toronto (Canada)
23–32
31-May-2009
United States - Ireland •

Report

Buck Shaw Stadium, Santa Clara (United States)
10–27

=== June ===
Date
Match

Venue
Result
3-June-2009
China - Pakistan

Report

UITM Mini Stadium, Shah Alam (Malaysia)
25–19
3-June-2009
Malaysia - India

Report

UITM Mini Stadium, Shah Alam (Malaysia)
43–29
6-June-2009
Pakistan - India

Report

UITM Mini Stadium, Shah Alam (Malaysia)
3–44
6-June-2009
Malaysia - China

Report

UITM Mini Stadium, Shah Alam (Malaysia)
43–15
6-June-2009
Lithuania - Netherlands ♦

Report

Vilnius (Lithuania)
6–3
6-June-2009
Canada - Georgia

Report

Infinity Park, Glendale (United States)
42–10
6-June-2009
England - Argentina •

Report

Old Trafford, Manchester (England)
37–15
6-June-2009
United States - Wales •

Report

Toyota Park, Bridgeview (United States)
15–48
9-June-2009
Mongolia - Kyrgyzstan

Report

Yoshlik Stadium, Tashkent (Uzbekistan)
21–38
12-June-2009
Romania - Uruguay •

Report

Stadionul Naţional de Rugby, Bucharest (Romania)
17–11
13-June-2009
Tonga - Fiji

Report

Nuku'alofa (Tonga)
22-36
13-June-2009
New Zealand - France •

Report

Carisbrook, Dunedin (New Zealand)
22–27
13-June-2009
Australia - Italy •

Report

Canberra Stadium, Canberra (Australia)
31–8
13-June-2009
Uzbekistan - Kyrgyzstan

Report

Yoshlik Stadium, Tashkent (Uzbekistan)
31–12
13-June-2009
Uganda - Tunisia ♦

Report

Kampala (Uganda)
17–41
13-June-2009
Argentina - England •

Report

Padre Ernesto Martearena, Salta (Argentina)
24–22
14-June-2009
Ivory Coast - Namibia ♦

Report

Stade Ohamproux, Abidjan (Côte d'Ivoire)
13–13
18-June-2009
Samoa - Japan

Report

Lawaqa Park, Sigatoka (Fiji)
34–15
20-June-2009
Australia - Italy •

Report

Etihad Stadium, Melbourne (Australia)
34–12
20-June-2009
New Zealand - France •

Report

Westpac Stadium, Wellington (New Zealand)
14–10
21-June-2009
Russia - Uruguay •

Report

Stadionul Naţional de Rugby, Bucharest (Romania)
29–26
21-June-2009
United States - Georgia

Report

Dick's Sporting Goods Park, Commerce City (United States)
31–13
23-June-2009
Tonga - Samoa

Report

Churchill Park, Lautoka (Fiji)
13–27
27-June-2009
Tonga - Japan

Report

Churchill Park, Lautoka (Fiji)
19–21
27-June-2009
Fiji - Samoa

Report

Churchill Park, Lautoka (Fiji)
19-14
27-June-2009
Australia - France •

Report

ANZ Stadium, Sydney (Australia)
22–6
27-June-2009
New Zealand - Italy •

Report

AMI Stadium, Christchurch (New Zealand)
27–6
27-June-2009
Cook Islands - Niue ♦

Report

Growers Stadium, Pukekohe (New Zealand)
29-7
27-June-2009
Papua New Guinea - Vanuatu ♦

Report

Lloyd Robson Oval, Port Moresby (Papua New Guinea)
86–12
27-June-2009
Namibia - Ivory Coast ♦

Report

Hage Geingob Rugby Stadium, Windhoek (Namibia)
54–14
27-June-2009
Tunisia - Uganda ♦

Report

Stade El Menzah, Tunis (Tunisia)
38–13

=== July ===
Date
Match

Venue
Result
1-July-2009
Guam - Indonesia

Report

TBA Manila (Philippines)
23–3
1-July-2009
Philippines - Iran

Report

TBA Manila (Philippines)
15–0
3-July-2009
Fiji - Japan

Report

Suva (Fiji)
40–39
4-July-2009
Papua New Guinea - Cook Islands ♦

Report

Lloyd Robson Oval, Port Moresby (Papua New Guinea)
29–21
4-July-2009
Indonesia - Iran

Report

Nomads Sporting Club, Manila (Philippines)
13–48
4-July-2009
Philippines - Guam

Report

Nomads Sporting Club, Manila (Philippines)
25–0
4-July-2009
United States - Canada ♦

Report

Blackbaud Stadium, Charleston (United States)
12–6
8-July-2009
Kenya - Senegal

Casablanca (Morocco)
22–7
8-July-2009
Morocco - Cameroon

Casablanca (Morocco)
12–0
10-July-2009
Niger - Benin

Tsévié (Togo)
–
10-July-2009
Togo - Mali

Tsévié (Togo)
6–5
11-July-2009
Samoa - Papua New Guinea ♦

Apia Park, Apia (Samoa)
115–7
11-July-2009
Morocco - Kenya

Safi (Morocco)
29-11
11-July-2009
Cameroon - Senegal

Safi (Morocco)
3-11
11-July-2009
Nigeria - Burkina Faso

Tsévié (Togo)
–
11-July-2009
Ghana - Chad

Tsévié (Togo)
–
11-July-2009
Canada - United States ♦

Ellerslie Rugby Park, Edmonton (Canada)
41–18
12-July-2009
Niger - Mali

Tsévié (Togo)
–
12-July-2009
Togo - Benin

Tsévié (Togo)
–
13-July-2009
Nigeria - Ghana

Tsévié (Togo)
–
13-July-2009
Burkina Faso - Chad

Tsévié (Togo)
–
14-July-2009
Niger - Togo

Tsévié (Togo)
–
14-July-2009
Mali - Benin

Tsévié (Togo)
–
15-July-2009
Burkina Faso - Ghana

Tsévié (Togo)
–
15-July-2009
Nigeria - Chad

Tsévié (Togo)
–
18-July-2009
Papua New Guinea - Samoa ♦

Lloyd Robson Oval, Port Moresby (Papua New Guinea)
–
18-July-2009
New Zealand - Australia

Eden Park, Auckland (New Zealand)
22–16
20-July-2009
Madagascar - Mauritius

Gaborone (Botswana)
–
20-July-2009
Botswana - Tanzania

Gaborone (Botswana)
–
20-July-2009
Zambia - Réunion

Gaborone (Botswana)
–
25-July-2009
South Africa - New Zealand

Vodacom Park, Bloemfontein (South Africa)
28–19

=== August ===
Date	Match	Venue	Result
1-August-2009	South Africa - New Zealand	ABSA Stadium, Durban (South Africa)	31–19
8-August-2009	South Africa - Australia	Newlands, Cape Town (South Africa)	29–17
22-August-2009	Australia - New Zealand	ANZ Stadium, Sydney (Australia)	18–19
29-August-2009	Australia - South Africa	Subiaco Oval, Perth (Australia)	25–32

=== September ===
Date	Match	Venue	Result
5-September-2009	Australia - South Africa	Suncorp Stadium, Brisbane (Australia)	21–6
12-September-2009	New Zealand - South Africa	Waikato Stadium, Hamilton (New Zealand)	29–32
19-September-2009	New Zealand - Australia	Westpac Stadium, Wellington (New Zealand)	33–6
22-September-2009	Barbados - Bermuda •	Gamson Savannah (Barbados)	5–47
26-September-2009	Trinidad and Tobago - Bermuda •	University of the West Indies Ground, Saint Augustine (Trinidad and Tobago)	32–19

== Other Test Match results ==
Date	Match	Venue	Result
30-May-2009	England - Barbarians	Twickenham, London (England)	26–33
6-June-2009	Australia - Barbarians	Sydney Football Stadium, Sydney (Australia)	55–7
20-June-2009	Argentina - French Barbarians	José Amalfitani Stadium, Buenos Aires (Argentina)	32–18
20-June-2009	South Africa - British and Irish Lions	ABSA Stadium, Durban (South Africa)	26–21
27-June-2009	South Africa - British and Irish Lions	Loftus Versfeld, Pretoria (South Africa)	28–25
4-July-2009	South Africa - British and Irish Lions	Coca-Cola Park, Johannesburg (South Africa)	9–28

== See also ==
- Rugby union in 2008
- 2009 in sports
