= List of Malta national rugby union team test matches =

A list of all international Tests played by the Malta national rugby union team. All data taken from maltarugby.com.

Date	Tournament	Location	Venue	Home team	Score	Away team
November 18, 2000	RWC Qualifying	Chișinău		Moldova	58-8	Malta
November 25, 2000	RWC Qualifying	Marsa		Malta	0-26	Belgium
January 20, 2001	RWC Qualifying	Marsa		Malta	3-9	Monaco
April 21, 2001	RWC Qualifying	Marsa		Malta	11-39	Lithuania
May 12, 2001	RWC Qualifying	Ljubljana		Slovenia	45-5	Malta
November 24, 2001	FIRA Championship D3	Marsa		Malta	8-0	Monaco
March 9, 2002	FIRA Championship D3	Marsa		Malta	27-14	Bulgaria
May 25, 2002	FIRA Championship D3	Ekeberg		Norway	10-10	Malta
November 23, 2002	FIRA Championship D3	Marsa		Malta	22-18	Lithuania
November 30, 2002	FIRA Championship D3	Vienna		Austria	16-25	Malta
March 29, 2003	FIRA Championship D3	Marsa		Malta	34-6	Luxembourg
April 5, 2003	FIRA Championship D3	Sarajevo		Bosnia and Herzegovina	14-20	Malta
April 17, 2004	FIRA Championship D3	Marsa		Malta	20-18	Serbia and Montenegro
April 25, 2004	FIRA Championship D3	Riga		Latvia	8-10	Malta
May 22, 2004	FIRA Championship D3	Marsa		Malta	35-27	Hungary
May 29, 2004	FIRA Championship D3	Chișinău		Moldova	22-8	Malta
October 16, 2004	RWC Qualifying	Avusy		Switzerland	8-17	Malta
November 6, 2004	RWC Qualifying	Marsa		Malta	13-38	Poland
April 9, 2005	RWC Qualifying	Marsa		Malta	17-24	Serbia and Montenegro
April 16, 2005	RWC Qualifying	Sofia		Bulgaria	15-23	Malta
May 21, 2005	RWC Qualifying	Odense		Denmark	12-3	Malta
May 28, 2005	RWC Qualifying	Marsa		Malta	28-18	Denmark
October 29, 2005	RWC Qualifying	Corradino		Malta	0-43	Germany
November 5, 2005	RWC Qualifying	Pančevo		Serbia and Montenegro	3-16	Malta
April 15, 2006	RWC Qualifying	Corradino		Malta	26-15	Croatia
April 22, 2006	RWC Qualifying	Brussels		Belgium	24-0	Malta
October 28, 2006	FIRA Championship D2	Riga		Latvia	27-16	Malta
November 4, 2006	FIRA Championship D2	Paola		Malta	18-40	Croatia
May 12, 2007	FIRA Championship D2	Paola		Malta	31-24	Andorra
May 19, 2007	FIRA Championship D2	Siedlce		Poland	36-3	Malta
November 10, 2007	FIRA Championship D2	Makarska		Croatia	24-9	Malta
November 17, 2007	FIRA Championship D2	Paola		Malta	16-13	Latvia
May 10, 2008	FIRA Championship D2	Paola		Malta	9-24	Poland
May 17, 2008	FIRA Championship D2	Andorra la Vella		Andorra	17-16	Malta
October 25, 2008	RWC Qualifying	Marsa		Malta	16-18	Croatia
November 1, 2008	RWC Qualifying	Vänersborg		Sweden	6-9	Malta
April 18, 2009	RWC Qualifying	Riga		Malta	32-19	Latvia
April 25, 2009	RWC Qualifying	Paola		Malta	9-27	Netherlands
October 31, 2009	FIRA Championship D2	Split		Croatia	34-14	Malta
November 7, 2009	FIRA Championship D2	Paola		Malta	25-23	Sweden
April 17, 2010	FIRA Championship D2	Amsterdam		Netherlands	19-0	Malta
April 24, 2010	FIRA Championship D2	Paola		Malta	27-10	Latvia
October 30, 2010	FIRA Championship D2	Šiauliai		Lithuania	9-6	Malta
November 6, 2010	FIRA Championship D2	Paola		Malta	26-33	Latvia
April 30, 2011	FIRA Championship D2	Paola		Malta	21-14	Croatia
May 7, 2011	FIRA Championship D2	Enköping		Sweden	24-13	Malta
October 29, 2011	FIRA Championship D2	Riga		Latvia	0-28	Malta
November 5, 2011	FIRA Championship D2	Paola		Malta	14-10	Lithuania
April 21, 2012	FIRA Championship D2	Paola		Malta	22-14	Sweden
April 28, 2012	FIRA Championship D2	Zagreb		Croatia	31-16	Malta
October 27, 2012	RWC Qualifying	Makarska		Croatia	20-19	Malta
November 3, 2012	RWC Qualifying	Paola		Malta	34-17	Lithuania
April 6, 2013	RWC Qualifying	Paola		Malta	10-19	Switzerland
April 13, 2013	RWC Qualifying	Amsterdam		Netherlands	48-10	Malta
November 2, 2013	FIRA Championship D2	Vilnius		Lithuania	10-13	Malta
November 9, 2013	FIRA Championship D2	Paola		Malta	37-18	Croatia
April 5, 2014	FIRA Championship D2	Paola		Malta	10-33	Netherlands
April 12, 2014	FIRA Championship D2	Winterthur		Switzerland	14-29	Malta
November 1, 2014	FIRA Championship D2	Paola		Malta	31-26	Croatia
November 8, 2014	FIRA Championship D2	Prague		Czech Republic	27-13	Malta
