= 2011 Rugby World Cup – Europe qualification =

European Regional World Cup 2012 Qualification

Tournament details
- Dates: 8 November 2008 – 5 June 2010
- No. of nations: 31

In the European Regional Rugby World Cup Qualifying, two teams, Georgia and Russia, qualified directly to the World Cup, and Romania, the third place team, entered a playoff against the second place African team, Tunisia.

The Qualification process primarily based around the 2008–2010 European Nations Cup. The top two teams in the 2008-2010 European Nations Cup First Division qualified directly to New Zealand.

The third placed team entered a playoff series against the champions of Division 2A, and the leaders of the remaining divisions (excluding 3D) as of the end of the 2008–2009 season. The winner of this playoff, Romania, entered a playoff to decide the 20th place at Rugby World Cup 2011.

== Round 1: European Nations Cup 2008–2010 ==
=== Division 1 ===
Georgia, the winner of Division 1 qualified for Pool B of Rugby World Cup 2011 as Europe 1, and Russia the runner-up, for Pool C as Europe 2. Romania, the third placed team, entered at Round 5 of Round 2's Playoff Series. Numbers in parentheses indicate world ranking at the start of the tournament.

ENC Champions and Qualified for Rugby World Cup as Europe 1
Qualified for Rugby World Cup as Europe 2
Qualified for Round 2 Europe Playoff Series

Place	Nation	Games				Points			Table points
Place	Nation	played	won	drawn	lost	for	against	difference	Table points
1	Georgia (16)	10	8	1	1	326	132	+194	27
2	Russia (17)	10	7	1	2	291	175	+116	25
3	Romania (19)	10	6	1	3	282	136	+146	23
4	Portugal (21)	10	5	1	4	255	149	+106	21
5	Spain (23)	10	2	0	8	145	304	−159	14
6	Germany (26)	10	0	0	10	58	461	−403	10

Match Results
Date	Home	Score	Away	Venue
November 8, 2008	Russia	42–15	Spain	Moscow, Russia
November 15, 2008	Spain	22–11	Germany	Estadio Universidad Complutense, Madrid, Spain
February 7, 2009	Germany	5–38	Georgia	Fritz-Grunebaum-Sportpark, Heidelberg, Germany
February 7, 2009	Portugal	14–18	Russia	Estádio Universitário, Lisbon, Portugal
February 7, 2009	Spain	10–19	Romania	Estadio Universidad Complutense, Madrid, Spain
February 14, 2009	Georgia	20–20	Portugal	Boris Paichadze National Stadium, Tbilisi, Georgia
February 14, 2009	Germany	0–22	Romania	Fritz-Grunebaum-Sportpark, Heidelberg, Germany
February 21, 2009	Portugal	44–6	Germany	Estádio Universitário, Lisbon, Portugal
February 28, 2009	Romania	19–28	Russia	Stadionul Naţional de Rugby, Bucharest, Romania
February 28, 2009	Spain	11–55	Georgia	Estadio Universidad Complutense, Madrid, Spain
March 14, 2009	Georgia	28–23	Romania	Boris Paichadze National Stadium, Tbilisi, Georgia
March 15, 2009	Portugal	24–19	Spain	Estádio Universitário, Lisbon, Portugal
March 21, 2009	Romania	21–22	Portugal	Stadionul Naţional de Rugby, Bucharest, Romania
March 22, 2009	Russia	21–29	Georgia	Illichivets Stadium, Mariupol, Ukraine
May 2, 2009	Germany	0–53	Russia	Rudolf-Kalweit-Stadion, Hanover, Germany
February 6, 2010	Russia	14–10	Portugal	Central Stadium, Sochi, Russia
February 6, 2010	Romania	45-27	Spain	Stadionul Naţional de Rugby, Bucharest, Romania
February 6, 2010	Georgia	77–3	Germany	Boris Paichadze National Stadium, Tbilisi, Georgia
February 13, 2010	Portugal	10–16	Georgia	Estádio Universitário, Lisbon, Portugal
February 13, 2010	Spain	20–38	Russia	Estadio Universidad Complutense, Madrid, Spain
February 13, 2010	Romania	67–5	Germany	Stadionul Constructorul Cleopatra, Constanţa, Romania
February 27, 2010	Germany	0–69	Portugal	Kultur- und Sportzentrum Martinsee, Heusenstamm, Germany
February 27, 2010	Georgia	17–9	Spain	Boris Paichadze National Stadium, Tbilisi, Georgia
February 27, 2010	Russia	21–21	Romania	Central Stadium, Sochi, Russia
March 13, 2010	Spain	15–33	Portugal	Estadio Universidad Complutense, Madrid, Spain
March 13, 2010	Romania	22–10	Georgia	Stadionul Naţional de Rugby, Bucharest, Romania
March 13, 2010	Russia	48–11	Germany	Central Stadium, Sochi, Russia
March 20, 2010	Portugal	9–20	Romania	Estádio Universitário, Lisbon, Portugal
March 20, 2010	Georgia	36–8	Russia	Akçaabat Fatih Stadium, Trabzon, Turkey
March 20, 2010	Germany	17–21	Spain	Fritz-Grunebaum-Sportpark, Heidelberg, Germany
March 27, 2010	Romania	48–3	Spain	Stadionul Naţional de Rugby, Bucharest, Romania

=== Division 2A ===
The winner of the division, Ukraine, qualified for Round 4 of Round 2's Playoff.

Promoted to Division 1 for 2010–2012 and qualified for 2011 RWC Qualifying

Place	Nation	Games				Points			Table points
Place	Nation	played	won	drawn	lost	for	against	difference	Table points
1	Ukraine (27)	8	5	0	3	140	109	+31	18
2	Belgium (31)	8	4	1	3	108	97	+11	17
3	Czech Republic (33)	8	3	1	4	135	142	−7	15
4	Poland (35)	7	3	0	4	94	118	−24	13
5	Moldova (38)	7	3	0	4	133	144	−11	13

- Poland ranked ahead of Moldova due to 30-28 victory in head to head match.

Match Results
Date	Home	Score	Away	Venue	Attendance
October 4, 2008	Poland	12–13	Ukraine	Stadion Widzewa, Łódź	4,000
November 1, 2008	Belgium	9–8	Ukraine	King Baudouin Stadium, Brussels	5,000
November 15, 2008	Czech Republic	7–13	Poland	Městský Stadion	1,200
November 15, 2008	Moldova	20–8	Belgium	Stadionul Dinamo	1,500
November 22, 2008	Czech Republic	11–9	Moldova	Tatře Smíchov Stadion	800
March 15, 2009	Belgium	15–15	Czech Republic	King Baudouin Stadium, Brussels	5,000
March 21, 2009	Ukraine	20–10	Czech Republic	Spartak Stadium, Kyiv	5,000
May 9, 2009	Ukraine	32–0	Moldova	Spartak Stadium, Kyiv	5,000
May 16, 2009	Moldova	28–30	Poland	Stadionul Dinamo	800
May 30, 2009	Poland	14–3	Belgium	Stadion Polonii Warszawa, Warsaw	6,000
September 12, 2009	Ukraine	19–12	Poland	Spartak Stadium, Kyiv	4,000
October 10, 2009	Ukraine	13–11	Belgium	Spartak Stadium, Kyiv	4,000
October 25, 2009	Poland	5–19	Czech Republic	Městský Stadion	6,000
October 31, 2009	Belgium	14–3	Moldova	King Baudouin Stadium, Brussels	3,000
November 14, 2009	Moldova	45–30	Czech Republic	Stadionul Dinamo	1,000
April 3, 2010	Czech Republic	16–19	Belgium	Prague	
April 10, 2010	Czech Republic	27–16	Ukraine	Říčany	
April 24, 2010	Belgium	29–8	Poland	King Baudouin Stadium, Brussels	
April 24, 2010	Moldova	28–19	Ukraine	Stadionul Dinamo	
^{1}	Poland	Postponed	Moldova	Městský Stadion	

^{1} The match between Poland and Moldova was originally scheduled for April 10, 2010, but was postponed after the death of Poland's president, Lech Kaczyński, earlier that day. The match was moved to January 1, 2011.

=== Division 2B ===
The leader of the division at the end of the 2008–2009 season, Netherlands, qualified for Round 3 of Round 2's Playoff.

Qualified for Round 2

Place	Nation	Games				Points			Table points
Place	Nation	played	won	drawn	lost	for	against	difference	Table points
1	Netherlands (41)	4	4	0	0	110	55	+55	12
2	Croatia (45)	4	3	0	1	74	60	+14	10
3	Malta (54)	4	2	0	2	66	70	−4	8
4	Sweden (43)	4	1	0	3	64	73	−9	6
5	Latvia (55)	4	0	0	4	47	103	−56	4

Match Results
Date	Home	Score	Away	Venue	Attendance
October 25, 2008	Sweden	21–5	Latvia	Vänersborg	300
October 25, 2008	Malta	16–18	Croatia	Paola	2,500
November 1, 2008	Netherlands	18–12	Croatia	Amsterdam	1,600
November 1, 2008	Sweden	6–9	Malta	Vänersborg	450
November 8, 2008	Latvia	10–29	Netherlands	Jelgava	350
April 18, 2009	Netherlands	36–24	Sweden	Amsterdam	
April 18, 2009	Latvia	19–32	Malta	Riga	
April 25, 2009	Malta	9–27	Netherlands	Paola	2,500
April 25, 2009	Croatia	21–13	Latvia	Makarska	500
May 2, 2009	Croatia	23–13	Sweden	Split	1,500

=== Division 3A ===
The leader of the division at the end of the 2008–2009 season, Lithuania, qualified for Round 2 of Round 2's Playoff.

Qualified for Round 2

Place	Nation	Games				Points			Table points
Place	Nation	played	won	drawn	lost	for	against	difference	Table points
1	Lithuania (37)	7	7	0	0	198	50	+148	21
2	Armenia (UR)	8	4	0	4	151	154	−3	16
3	Serbia (59)	8	3	0	5	92	153	−61	14
4	Andorra (66)	7	2	0	5	112	173	−61	11
5	Switzerland (58)	6	2	0	4	79	102	−23	10

Armenia were ranked ahead of Serbia and Andorra were ranked ahead of Switzerland based on head-to-head results.

Match Results
Date	Home	Score	Away	Venue	Attendance
September 13, 2008	Serbia	0–41	Armenia	Smederevo	100
October 18, 2008	Armenia	35–15	Switzerland	Abovyan	300
November 8, 2008	Andorra	10–26	Lithuania	Andorra la Vella	1,000
November 15, 2008	Lithuania	33–0	Switzerland	Vilnius	350
December 6, 2008	Serbia	32–7	Andorra	Smederevo	
March 14, 2009	Switzerland	32–9	Andorra	Avusy	500
March 21, 2009	Andorra	36–10	Armenia	Andorra la Vella	150
April 4, 2009	Switzerland	6–12	Serbia	Nyon	
May 2, 2009	Lithuania	50–9	Serbia	Vilnius	400
May 9, 2009	Armenia	19–24	Lithuania	Abovyan	
October 10, 2009	Lithuania	40–12	Andorra	Šiauliai	

All four remaining matches were scratched as Lithuania had already won the group.

=== Division 3B ===
The leader of the division at the end of the 2008–2009 season, Slovenia, qualified for Round 1 of Round 2's Playoff.

Qualified for Round 2

Place	Nation	Games				Points			Table points
Place	Nation	played	won	drawn	lost	for	against	difference	Table points
1	Slovenia (59)	4	4	0	0	89	64	+25	12
2	Hungary (65)	4	3	0	1	116	72	+44	10
3	Denmark (73)	4	2	0	2	78	88	−10	8
4	Norway (81)	4	1	0	3	54	63	−9	6
5	Austria (90)	4	0	0	4	31	81	−50	4

Match Results
Date	Home	Score	Away	Venue	Attendance
September 13, 2008	Slovenia	32–26	Hungary	Ljubljana	
September 27, 2008	Norway	15–26	Hungary	Oslo	300
October 11, 2008	Norway	11–3	Austria	Oslo	300
October 18, 2008	Hungary	39–12	Denmark	Kecskemét	500
November 1, 2008	Denmark	19–25	Slovenia	Odense	915
November 8, 2008	Austria	9–18	Slovenia	Vienna	500
April 11, 2009	Denmark	20–18	Norway	Odense	600
April 18, 2009	Hungary	25–13	Austria	Esztergom	
April 25, 2009	Austria	6–27	Denmark	Linz	
April 25, 2009	Slovenia	14–10	Norway	Slovenia	1,000

=== Division 3C ===
The leader of the division at the end of the 2008–2009 season, Israel, qualified for Round 1 of Round 2's Playoff.

Qualified for Round 2

Place	Nation	Games				Points			Table points
Place	Nation	played	won	drawn	lost	for	against	difference	Table points
1	Israel (86)	4	4	0	0	136	26	+110	12
2	Greece (UR)	4	3	0	1	80	67	+13	10
3	Bulgaria (89)	4	2	0	2	73	72	+1	8
4	Luxembourg (94)	4	1	0	3	51	84	−33	6
5	Finland (95)	4	0	0	4	47	138	−91	4

Match Results
Date	Home	Score	Away	Venue	Attendance
October 4, 2008	Finland	19–27	Luxembourg	Helsinki	300
October 11, 2008	Finland	10–12	Greece	Helsinki	250
November 15, 2008	Bulgaria	8 -11	Israel	Pernik	850
November 22, 2008	Greece	10–25	Israel	Kifissia	600
November 29, 2008	Luxembourg	10–18	Bulgaria	Luxembourg	400
March 21, 2009	Israel	30–0	Luxembourg	Netanya	400
April 11, 2009	Greece	41–18	Bulgaria	Greece	3,000
April 25, 2009	Bulgaria	29–10	Finland	Pernik	500
April 25, 2009	Luxembourg	14–17	Greece	Luxembourg	600
May 2, 2009	Israel	70–8	Finland	Netanya	500

== Round 2: European Nations Cup Champions Playoff Series ==
Match Results					
Date	Home	Score	Away	Venue	Attendance
Round 1
9-May-2009	Israel	26–19	Slovenia	Wingate Institute, Netanya, Israel	1,000
Round 2
23-May-2009	Israel	3–19	Lithuania	Wingate Institute, Netanya, Israel	1,000
Round 3
6-June-2009	Lithuania	6–3	Netherlands	Vingis Park, Vilnius, Lithuania	1,000
Round 4
8-May-2010	Lithuania	16–27	Ukraine	Savivaldybė Stadium, Šiauliai, Lithuania	3,500
Round 5
22-May-2010	Ukraine	3–33	Romania	Spartak Stadium, Kyiv, Ukraine	
5-June-2010	Romania	61–7	Ukraine	Stadionul Municipal, Botoşani, Romania	

== Sources ==
- https://www.irb.com
- https://web.archive.org/web/20110825205045/http://www.fira-aer-rugby.com/
- http://www.fira-aer-rugby.com/medias/matches/2008_BG_IL.pdf
- https://web.archive.org/web/20090521154538/http://fpr.pt/noticias/noticia.asp?opm=25&id=7542&id2=25
