= Yugoslavia national under-19 rugby union team =

SFR Yugoslavia
- Union: Ragbi Savez Jugoslavije
- Nickname: Plavi
Team kit

First international
- Romania 35 – 3 Yugoslavia (11 April 1974)

Largest win
- Yugoslavia 32 – 3 Andorra (1 April 1988)

Largest defeat
- Yugoslavia 3 – 86 Italy (30 November 1985)

The Yugoslavia national rugby union U19 team used to represent Yugoslavia at Rugby union in under-age competitions until the 1990s.

== History ==
Yugoslavia U19 made their debut in FIRA Championship 1974 in Heidelberg (Germany)against a Romanian, losing 6 points to 35.

Yugoslavia U19 regularly played in FIRA Championships till 1990 and event in Treviso. In 1988 Yugoslavia hosted FIRA Championship in Makarska, Tucepi and Baska Voda.

Yugoslavia U19 since 1977 played annual games against ItalyU17 side.

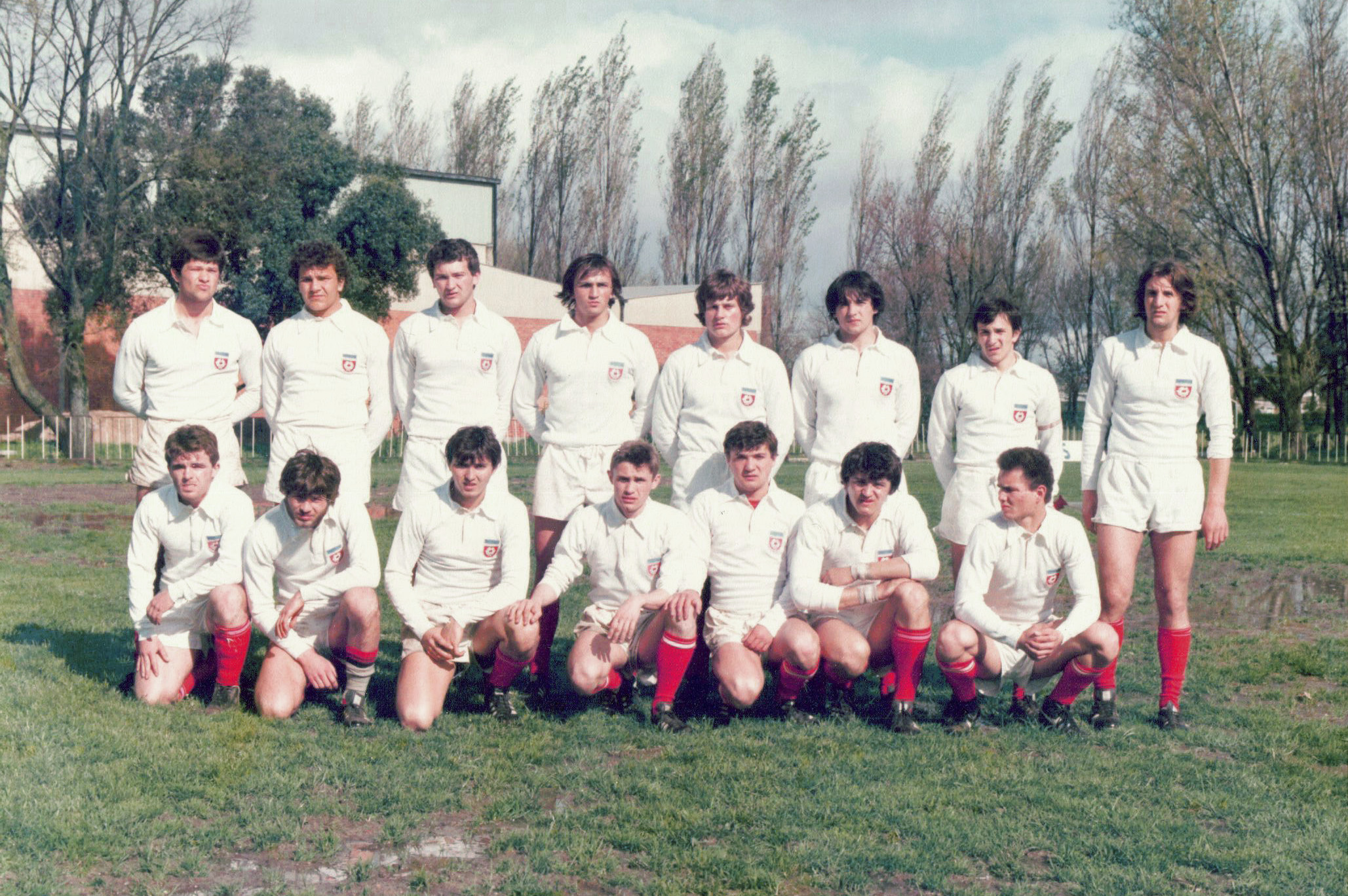
Yugoslavia U19 in Lisboa,1979

== Results ==
| Date | Venue | Opposition | Result | Tournament |
|---|---|---|---|---|
| 11.04.1974. | Heidelberg | Romania | 6–35 | FIRA Championship |
| 13.04.1974. | Heidelberg | Morocco | 6–19 | FIRA Championship |
| 15.04.1974. | Heidelberg | Czechoslovakia | 6–39 | FIRA Championship |
| 29.10.1975. | SPLIT | Felbridge Juniors (ENG) | 6–87 | |
| 14.04.1976. | Albi | Selection Tarn (FRA) | 3–72 | FIRA Championship |
| 16.04.1976. | Albi | Poland | 7–34 | FIRA Championship |
| 18.04.1976. | Albi | Portugal | 6–50 | FIRA Championship |
| 16.01.1977. | East Grinstead | Felbridge Juniors (ENG) | 0–40 | England Tour |
| 18.01.1977. | Purley | Purley Colts (ENG) | 3–44 | England Tour |
| 27.11.1977. | LJUBLJANA | Italy U17 | 6–52 | |
| 22.03.1978. | Parma | Selection Emiliana (ITA) | 60–16 | FIRA Championship |
| 24.03.1978. | Parma | Italy B | 16–48 | FIRA Championship |
| 26.03.1978. | Parma | Tunisia | 28–6 | FIRA Championship |
| 11.04.1979. | Lisboa | Soviet Union | 7–68 | FIRA Championship |
| 13.04.1979. | Lisboa | Tunisia | 0–14 | FIRA Championship |
| 15.04.1979. | Lisboa | Tunisia | 17–4 | FIRA Championship |
| 10.02.1980. | San Dona di Piave | Italy U17 | 3–44 | |
| 30.03.1980. | Tunis | Universitaire Tunis | 24–0 | |
| 02.04.1980. | Tunis | Ivory Coast | 11–16 | FIRA Championship |
| 04.04.1980. | Tunis | Tunisia | 15–3 | FIRA Championship |
| 06.04.1980. | Tunis | Tunisia | 3–19 | FIRA Championship |
| 29.03.1981. | SPLIT | Italy U17 | 6–35 | |
| 28.11.1982. | Udine | Italy U17 | 4–10 | |
| 26.11.1983. | SPLIT | Italy U17 | 10–20 | |
| 14.04.1984. | Havirov | Slavia Praha seniors (CZE) | 18–16 | |
| 17.04.1984. | Warszawa | Poland | 18–15 | FIRA Championship |
| 19.04.1984. | Warszawa | Romania | 0–17 | FIRA Championship |
| 21.04.1984. | Warszawa | Czechoslovakia | 9–9 | FIRA Championship |
| 09.09.1984. | SPLIT | Caterham School (ENG) | 32–0 | |
| 01.12.1984. | Quatro D'Alpinone | Italy U17 | 9–20 | |
| 04.04.1985. | Brussels | Italy | 0–53 | FIRA Championship |
| 06.04.1985. | Brussels | West Germany | 6–21 | FIRA Championship |
| 08.04.1985. | Brussels | Belgium | 9–13 | FIRA Championship |
| 30.11.1985. | SPLIT | Italy U17 | 3–86 | |
| 24.03.1986. | Buchurest | Portugal | 6–39 | FIRA Championship |
| 26.03.1986. | Buchurest | Tunisia | 6–11 | FIRA Championship |
| 28.03.1986. | Buchurest | Switzerland | 10–31 | FIRA Championship |
| 30.11.1986. | Paese | Italy U17 | 3–27 | |
| 13.04.1987. | Berlin | Portugal | 8–25 | FIRA Championship |
| 16.04.1987. | Berlin | Denmark | 14–0 | FIRA Championship |
| 18.04.1987. | Berlin | Netherlands | 18–21 | FIRA Championship |
| 28.11.1987. | SPLIT | Italy U17 | 0–32 | |
| 29.03.1988. | MAKARSKA | Netherlands | 6–24 | FIRA Championship |
| 01.04.1988. | MAKARSKA | Andorra | 32–3 | FIRA Championship |
| 03.04.1988. | MAKARSKA | Switzerland | 10–3 | FIRA Championship |
| 27.11.1988. | Udine | Italy U17 | 15–21 | |
| 02.12.1989. | ZAGREB | Italy U17 | 0–40 | |
| 10.04.1990. | Treviso | West Germany | 9–54 | FIRA Championship |
| 12.04.1990. | Treviso | Italy U18 | 6–78 | FIRA Championship |
| 14.04.1990. | Treviso | Switzerland | 7–7 (3:1) | FIRA Championship |
| 01.12.1990. | San Dona di Piave | Italy U17 | 3–64 | |

== The Most Capped Players ==
| Name | Club | Games | Points |
|---|---|---|---|
| Dejan STIGLIC | BRK | 14 | 4 |
| Goran OSLJANAC | RK Dinamo (Pancevo) | 13 | 16 |
| DJoni MANDIC | RK Rudar (Zenica) | 12 | |
| Damir PECANAC | RK Metalac (Sisak) | 11 | 8 |
| Zdravko MIJIC | RK Student (Sisak) | 11 | 8 |
| Igor PECNJAK | RK Nada (Split) | 11 | 4 |
| Tihomir VRANESEVIC | RK Student (Sisak) | 10 | 4 |
| Damir UZUNOVIC | RK Celik (Zenica) | 10 | 16 |
| Marjan PETRUSIC | RK Nada (Split) | 10 | 17 |
| Aleksandar KOSTIC | BRK | 10 | 27 |

== Bibliography ==
- Proslo je 30 godina, anniversary book, 1985, published by SFR Yugoslavia Rugby Union
- 20 godina Ragbi kluba Zagreb, 1984, published by RK Zagreb
- 10 godina ragbija na Makarskoj rivijeri 1968–1978, published by RK Energoinvest Makarska
- 50 godina Ragbi kluba Nada 1959–2009, published by RK Nada Split
