= Rugby union in Libya =

Rugby union in Libya is a minor but growing sport.

== Governing body ==
Libyan rugby is not yet affiliated to the IRB.

== History ==
Libyan rugby is of relatively recent origin, although it has been played in neighbouring countries such as Italy and Malta, and to a lesser extent Tunisia. It is believed that the first rugby in Libya was played by British troops or possibly Italians. Like many other Maghrebi nations, Libyan rugby tended to look to Europe for inspiration, rather than to the rest of Africa.

The first Libyan team, the Benghazi Wasps, was set up in the 1970s and played against teams from expatriate oil workers. In 1998, Jamal abed founded team called the Tripoli Barbarians, but it was not until 2008 that official club teams recognised by Libya's governing body for sports were set up in Benghazi.

The first official tournament took place in 2008 in Benghazi, organised by Thair El Heri. The first officially recognised body for rugby was the Benghazi Rugby Committee.

== See also ==
- Confederation of African Rugby
- Africa Cup
