= 2007 Rugby World Cup – Europe qualification =

Tournament details
- Dates: 4 September 2004 – 25 November 2006
- No. of nations: 36

2007 Rugby World Cup – European qualification was a European Nations Cup competition that decided which European teams participated in the 2007 Rugby World Cup in France. The group stages counted towards both qualification and the European Nations Cup. Hosts France and other 2003 World Cup quarter finalists England, Ireland, Scotland and Wales qualified automatically.

== Qualification process ==
There were three places available for European teams, and one place in the repechage. The teams were ranked according to their division in the European Nations Cup, taking into account the relegations and promotions at the end of the previous competition. Note that for the 2004/05 season Division 1 did not count towards World Cup qualification. The 2005/06 season decided which round (either 4 or 5) the teams entered. In the group rounds, there were three points awarded for a win, two for a draw, and one for a loss. There were no bonus points awarded.

=== Round 1 ===
The eight teams from divisions 3B (apart from those newly relegated from 3A Hungary) and 3C (apart from Azerbaijan and Armenia) played each other in four two-legged playoffs. The winners entered the next round.

=== Round 2 ===
The four Round 1 winners, Hungary, and the fifteen teams from divisions 2A, 2B and 3A were drawn into four groups of five. They played each other once, with the best two teams qualifying for the next round. The third placed teams played in two two-legged playoffs to qualify for the next round.

=== Round 3 ===
The four winners, four runners-up, and two play-off winners from Round 2 were drawn into two groups of five. The best team from each group played each other in a two legged playoff for a place in the next round.

=== Round 4 ===
The bottom three teams from Division 1 2005/06 and the winner of the previous round played two two-legged playoffs to enter the next round.

=== Round 5 ===
The winner of Round 4 Playoff 1, the third placed team from Division 1 2005/06 and Six Nations competitor Italy form Pool A. The winner of Round 4 Playoff 2 and the first and second placed teams from Division 1 2005/06 form Pool B. The top team from each pool qualified for the World Cup as Europe 1 and Europe 2. The second placed teams entered the next round.

=== Round 6 ===
The two second placed teams from Round 5 played a two-legged playoff, with the winner qualifying for the World Cup as Europe 3. The loser entered the repechage as Europe 4.

== Round 1 ==
Andorra, Austria, Bulgaria and Lithuania qualified for round 2.

4 September 2004

Andorra	76–3	Norway

Andorra La Vella
Referee: André Watson (South Africa)

18 September 2004

Norway	9–23	Andorra

Bergen

Andorra won 99–12 on aggregate

The first match was refereed by André Watson. He was called by the International Board, because in this way the first match of qualification the new edition of Rugby World Cup could be refereed by the same judge as the last match (the final) of the Rugby World Cup 2003. Watson had announced his retirement from international rugby only three months before after a match between Australia and Pacific Islands.

25 September 2004

Bosnia and Herzegovina	10–29	Austria

Zenica

16 October 2004

Austria	12–7	Bosnia and Herzegovina

Vienna

Austria won 41–17 on aggregate

18 September 2004

Finland	3–42	Bulgaria

Helsinki

30 October 2004

Bulgaria	50–3	Finland

Sofia

Bulgaria won 92–6 on aggregate

16 October 2004

Israel	0–53	Lithuania

Raanana

23 October 2004

Lithuania	60–7	Israel

Vilnius

Lithuania won 113–7 on aggregate

== Round 2 ==
=== Pool A ===
Spain and Croatia qualified for Round 3. Andorra entered the playoffs.

Place	Nation	Games				Points			Table points
Place	Nation	played	won	drawn	lost	for	against	difference	Table points
1	Spain	4	3	1	0	201	55	+146	11
2	Croatia	4	3	1	0	115	54	+61	11
3	Andorra	4	2	0	2	88	75	+13	8
4	Slovenia	4	1	0	3	58	141	−83	6
5	Hungary	4	0	0	4	40	177	−137	4

Match Schedule

23 October 2004

Hungary	16–29	Andorra

Stardom

23 October 2004

Croatia	27–6	Slovenia

Split

6 November 2004

Slovenia	41–0	Hungary

Ljubljana

21 November 2004

Croatia	18–7	Andorra

Sisak

21 November 2004

Spain	63–9	Hungary

Madrid

13 February 2005

Andorra	14–36	Spain

Andorra La Vella

27 March 2005

Slovenia	6–76	Spain

Ljubljana

10 April 2005

Spain	26–26	Croatia

Sevilla

23 April 2005

Hungary	15–44	Croatia

Budapest

30 April 2005

Andorra	38–5	Slovenia

Andorra La Vella

=== Pool B ===
Germany and Moldova qualified for Round 3. Denmark entered the playoffs.

Place	Nation	Games				Points			Table points
Place	Nation	played	won	drawn	lost	for	against	difference	Table points
1	Germany	4	4	0	0	248	27	+221	12
2	Moldova	4	2	0	2	100	63	+37	8
3	Denmark	4	2	0	2	33	84	−51	8
4	Austria	4	2	0	2	42	101	−56	8
5	Luxembourg	4	0	0	4	20	168	−148	4

Match Schedule

30 October 2004

Denmark	11–20	Moldova

Odense

13 November 2004

Moldova	18–27	Germany

Chișinău

13 November 2004

Luxembourg	5–6	Denmark

Cessange

27 November 2004

Germany	96–0	Luxembourg

Heidelberg

2 April 2005

Germany	56–0	Denmark

Heidelberg

9 April 2005

Denmark	16–3	Austria

Fredericia

16 April 2005

Moldova	55–6	Luxembourg

Chișinău

23 April 2005

Austria	9–69	Germany

Vienna

30 April 2005

Austria	19–7	Moldova

Vienna

7 May 2005

Luxembourg	9–11	Austria

Cessange

=== Pool C ===
Belgium and the Netherlands qualified for Round 3. Sweden entered the playoffs.

Place	Nation	Games				Points			Table points
Place	Nation	played	won	drawn	lost	for	against	difference	Table points
1	Belgium	4	4	0	0	95	46	+49	12
2	Netherlands	4	3	0	1	133	53	+80	10
3	Sweden	4	2	0	2	76	98	−22	8
4	Latvia	4	1	0	3	63	103	−40	6
5	Lithuania	4	0	0	4	56	123	−67	4

Match Schedule

23 October 2004

Latvia	18–20	Sweden

Valmiera

30 October 2004

Belgium	23–16	Latvia

Boitsfort

31 October 2004

Sweden	32–20	Lithuania

Helsingborg

9 April 2005

Lithuania	13–21	Belgium

Jurbarkas

16 April 2005

Belgium	15–10	Netherlands

Vise

23 April 2005

Netherlands	24–17	Sweden

Amsterdam

30 April 2005

Sweden	7–36	Belgium

Stockholm

30 April 2005

Latvia	19–12	Lithuania

Riga

7 May 2005

Netherlands	48–10	Latvia

Amsterdam

14 May 2005

Lithuania	11–51	Netherlands

Klaipėda

=== Pool D ===
Poland and Serbia and Montenegro qualified for round 3. Malta entered the playoffs.

Place	Nation	Games				Points			Table points
Place	Nation	played	won	drawn	lost	for	against	difference	Table points
1	Poland	4	4	0	0	125	49	+76	12
2	Serbia and Montenegro	4	2	1	1	79	52	+27	9
3	Malta	4	2	0	2	66	85	−19	8
4	Switzerland	4	1	1	2	77	51	+26	7
5	Bulgaria	4	0	0	4	38	148	−110	4

Match Schedule

2 October 2004

Poland	20–15	Switzerland

Gdynia

16 October 2004

Switzerland	8–17	Malta

Avusy

6 November 2004

Malta	13–38	Poland

Marsa

13 November 2004

Serbia and Montenegro	33–10	Bulgaria

Belgrade

12 March 2005

Switzerland	43–3	Bulgaria

Geneva

19 March 2005

Serbia and Montenegro	11–11	Switzerland

Belgrade

9 April 2005

Malta	13–24	Serbia and Montenegro

Marsa

16 April 2005

Bulgaria	15–23	Malta

Sofia

23 April 2005

Bulgaria	10–49	Poland

Sofia

7 May 2005

Poland	18–11	Serbia and Montenegro

Łódź

=== Playoffs ===
Andorra and Malta qualified for Round 3.

21 May 2005

Denmark	12–3	Malta

Copenhagen

29 May 2005

Malta	28–18	Denmark

Marsa

Malta win 31–30 on aggregate

28 May 2005

Andorra	30–20	Sweden

Foix (France)

4 June 2005

Sweden	14–10	Andorra

Vanersborg

Andorra won 40–34 on aggregate

== Round 3 ==
=== Pool A ===
Spain entered playoff.

Place	Nation	Games				Points			Table points
Place	Nation	played	won	drawn	lost	for	against	difference	Table points
1	Spain	4	4	0	0	163	32	+131	12
2	Moldova	4	3	0	1	87	96	−9	10
3	Netherlands	4	2	0	2	113	74	+39	8
4	Poland	4	1	0	3	63	131	−68	6
5	Andorra	4	0	0	4	30	123	−93	4

Match Schedule

29 October 2005

Poland	18–14	Andorra

Sopot

12 November 2005

Spain	68–12	Poland

Madrid

12 November 2005

Moldova	30–27	Netherlands

Chișinău

19 November 2005

Moldova	7–40	Spain

Chișinău

26 November 2005

Netherlands	51–0	Andorra

Amsterdam

11 March 2006

Andorra	0–31	Spain

Andorra La Vella

8 April 2006

Poland	13–27	Moldova

Sochaczew

22 April 2006

Netherlands	22–20	Poland

Amsterdam

29 April 2006

Spain	24–13	Netherlands

Madrid

6 May 2006

Andorra	16–23	Moldova

Andorra La Vella

=== Pool B ===
Germany entered playoff.

Place	Nation	Games				Points			Table points
Place	Nation	played	won	drawn	lost	for	against	difference	Table points
1	Germany	4	4	0	0	209	30	+179	12
2	Belgium	4	3	0	1	101	68	+33	10
3	Malta	4	2	0	2	42	85	−43	8
4	Croatia	4	1	0	3	76	86	−10	6
5	Serbia and Montenegro	4	0	0	4	27	186	−159	4

Match Schedule

8 October 2005

Croatia	26–9	Serbia and Montenegro

Split

29 October 2005

Belgium	26–20	Croatia

Brussels

29 October 2005

Malta	0–43	Germany

Marsa

5 November 2005

Serbia and Montenegro	3–16	Malta

Pancevo

11 November 2005

Germany	108–0	Serbia and Montenegro

Heidelberg

8 April 2006

Serbia and Montenegro	15–36	Belgium

Belgrade

15 April 2006

Malta	26–15	Croatia

Marsa

22 April 2006

Croatia	15–25	Germany

Zagreb

22 April 2006

Belgium	24–0	Malta

Brussels

29 April 2006

Germany	33–15	Belgium

Hanover

=== Playoff ===
Spain qualified for Round 4.

14 May 2006

Germany	18–6	Spain

Heidelberg

28 May 2006

Spain	36–10	Germany

Madrid

Spain win 42–28 on aggregate

== European Nations Cup Division 1 2004/06 ==
See 2004–2006_European_Nations_Cup_First_Division

Romania, Georgia, and Portugal qualified for Round 5. Russia, Czech Republic, and Ukraine qualified for Round 4.

Place	Nation	Games				Points			Table points
Place	Nation	played	won	drawn	lost	for	against	difference	Table points
1	Romania	10	8	0	2	389	94	+295	26
2	Georgia	10	8	0	2	353	125	+228	26
3	Portugal	10	6	1	3	193	183	+10	23
4	Russia	10	4	1	5	290	202	+88	19
5	Czech Republic	10	3	0	7	164	306	−142	16
6	Ukraine	10	0	0	10	77	556	−479	10

== Round 4 – September 2006 ==
Spain and Russia qualified for Round 5.

16 September 2006

Czech Republic	12–33	Spain

Říčany

30 September 2006

Spain	46–17	Czech Republic

Madrid

Spain won 79–29 on aggregate

23 September 2006

Ukraine	11–25	Russia

Odesa

30 September 2006

Russia	37–17	Ukraine

Moscow

Russia won 62–28 on aggregate

== Round 5 – October 2006 ==
=== Pool A ===
Italy qualified for World Cup as Europe 1. Portugal entered Round 6.

Place	Nation	Games				Points			Table points
Place	Nation	played	won	drawn	lost	for	against	difference	Table points
1	Italy	2	2	0	0	150	7	+143	6
2	Portugal	2	1	0	1	26	106	−80	4
3	Russia	2	0	0	2	30	93	−63	2

Match Schedule

7 October 2006

Italy	83–0	Portugal
Try: M Bergamasco; Bortolami; Canavosio; Dellape; Festuccia; Masi (2); Robertson (3); Stanojevic (3); Con: Bortolussi (8); Peens

Stadio T.Fattori, L'Aquila
Referee: Donal Courtney (Ireland)

14 October 2006

Russia	7–67	Italy

Moscow

28 October 2006

Portugal	26–23	Russia

Lisbon

=== Pool B ===
Romania qualified for World Cup as Europe 2. Georgia entered Round 6.

Place	Nation	Games				Points			Table points
Place	Nation	played	won	drawn	lost	for	against	difference	Table points
1	Romania	2	2	0	0	63	28	+35	6
2	Georgia	2	1	0	1	45	43	+2	4
3	Spain	2	0	0	2	43	80	−37	2

Match Schedule

7 October 2006

Romania	20–8	Georgia

Bucharest

14 October 2006

Spain	20–43	Romania

Madrid

28 October 2006

Georgia	37–23	Spain

Tbilisi

== Round 6 – November 2006 ==
Georgia qualified for World Cup as Europe 3. Portugal entered repechage as Europe 4.

11 November 2006

Georgia	17–3	Portugal

Tbilisi

25 November 2006

Portugal	11–11	Georgia

Lisbon

Georgia won 28–14 on aggregate
