= Rugby union in Malta =

- Country: Malta
- Governing body: Malta Rugby Football Union
- National team: Malta
- First played: Late 19th century
- Registered players: 4575
- Clubs: 12 (2022 5 clubs now)

National competitions
- Rugby World Cup; Rugby World Cup Sevens; IRB Sevens World Series; European Nations Cup

Rugby union in Malta is a small but growing sport. The national senior men's team are ranked 46th by the World Rugby.

== Governing body ==
The governing body is the Malta Rugby Football Union. Since 2000, the MRFU has been a full member of World Rugby.

== History ==
Rugby was first brought into Malta by the British, who ruled the island for nearly 200 years. The first matches appear to have been played by British sailors during the late 19th century.

In 1946, the Overseas Rugby Club was established, becoming the first proper rugby club on the island, which consisted mainly of British servicemen.

However, the game only started becoming properly organised at the end of the 20th century. During the 1970s, St. Edwards College and Tal-Handaq College started teaching the game, but it also received a blow, in 1979, with the withdrawal of Malta from NATO, which deprived it of the military teams which had formerly played there. In 1983 a set of enthusiasts met at the Marsa sports ground, mainly ex-students of St Edwards College (who had previously played against the British forces based in Malta) and a few others, attracted by an advertisement in the "Times of Malta" and held an informal 10 a-side match which was the beginning of the re-introduction of Rugby to Malta. Saturday games continued in a sort of mix & match style, dividing the numbers into two teams. As the numbers grew the Phoenician's Rugby Club was formed and that team played against teams visiting the island and the Navy ships which sporadically visited the island. Phoenicians also traveled several times to play clubs in Sicily. A decision was made to create another club for competition's sake and the Overseas Rugby Club was re-formed. At this time around 1986 a group of students who had studied at various schools in the UK returned to Malta to attend university and so the University Rugby Club was formed. By 1990 a mini-league had been established of Overseas RC, Phoenicians and the University of Malta, which also saw a Cup and 7s competition, both initially won by Overseas RC. Matches were also played against visiting navy vessels and touring sides from the UK and Italy The Kavallieri Rugby Club was formed in 1991 with many players coming from Water Polo and even some players from wrestling. Kavallieri entered Rugby as the Overseas "B" team, so they could learn the game under their tutelage. For a period of two years the International Tourism School (ITS) formed under the guidance of a South African teacher, but due to the students having to engage in international work experience, they struggled for players and eventually disbanded. In 1996 the Stompers Rugby Club was formed.

In 2006, women's rugby began in Malta, now boasting five active clubs and a strong national 7s program.

During the 2008 national election, the Nationalist Party, or PN, included the construction of a national rugby stadium as an element in its platform. The PN was victorious in the 2008 election, and formed government. In 2010, it announced the beginning of the fulfillment of this promise through a plan for the construction of such a stadium, connected to a larger sporting, recreational and residential complex with at least one rugby pitch beyond that of the stadium.

Due to its mild Mediterranean climate, Malta is a popular destination for rugby tours.

== Domestic Competitions ==
As of the 2009–2010 season (the Maltese domestic rugby season traditionally runs through the Northern Hemisphere winter), there were four primary domestic competitions for senior men, two for senior women, and three age-grade competitions for junior boys.

Senior Men:

- Cisk Lager Men's Championship (8 matches per team, 15-aside)
- MRFU Cup (4 matches per team, 15-aside)
- MRFU 10s League (8 matches per team, 10-aside)
- MRFU 10s Cup (3 matches per team, 10-aside)

The 10-aside competitions function as "second division" competitions, consisting largely of clubs' second teams and teams from smaller clubs.

Senior Women:

- MRFU 10s Cup (3 matches per team, 10-aside)
- Ben Bennett 7s Cup (9 matches per team, 7-aside)

Junior Boys:

- U17s GasanMamo Youth League
- U15s GasanMamo Youth League
- U13s GasanMamo Youth League

== Clubs ==
There are seven active (entered at least one of the national competitions in 2009–10) clubs in Malta, as follows:

- Birkirkara Alligators (No longer exists)
- Falcons (All Senior men's & Women's & Junior Boys' competitions)
- Kavallieri (All competitions Including U10's and above)
- Overseas (Senior Men's 15-aside & Women's competitions)
- Qormi Wasps (No longer exists)
- Stompers RFC (All Senior Men's and Women's competitions)
- Valletta Lions (No longer exists but still trying to recruit)
- UM Wolves RFC (All Senior Men's & Women's Competitions. Youth Academy)

== National teams ==
The Malta national rugby union team (men's) competes in the European Nations Cup (ENC). They have done well, when compared to the size and playing population of the country. They completed the 2008-2010 competition in Division 2B of the ENC. They finished 3rd in the two-year competition, meaning that they are playing in the same division (renamed "2A") for the 2010-2012 competition. A number of players come from the Maltese diaspora in the UK and Australia. However, the number of locally based players is increasing.

The Maltese national women's rugby 7s team have been very successful in European competitions, earning promotion in 2009 to the "A" division of these tournaments (the middle of three European divisions).

== Women's rugby ==
Although Malta's women have not yet played test match rugby, they have been playing international sevens rugby since 2004. (Current playing record).
