= Malta Rugby Football Union =

Governing body for rugby union in malta

- Sport: Rugby union
- Founded: 1991; 35 years ago
- World Rugby affiliation: 2000
- Rugby Europe affiliation: 2000
- President: Gerald Strickland
- Men's coach: Phil Pretorius
- Women's coach: Carmelo Longo
- Website: rugbymalta.com

The Malta Rugby Football Union (MRFU) is the governing body for rugby union in Malta. The MRFU is a full member of Rugby Europe and World Rugby. The MRFU is a member of SportMalta, the Maltese islands' national sports body.

== History ==
Originally, rugby union in Malta was largely played by members of the British military forces stationed there. In the 1970s. St Edward's College RFC and Overseas RUFC had been established for the local Maltese civilians, also predominantly playing against British military teams. De La Salle College also briefly established a team before the headmaster banned it due to a number of injuries that occurred. Rugby in Malta later suffered a downturn in the late 1970s following the withdrawal of the British forces from their Malta Command postings. In the 1980s, a number of British expatriates advertised in the Times of Malta to try to re-establish the sport. They lacked qualified referees in this time until the Australian Assistant High Commissioner to Malta John Morrison offered to referee. In 1991, the Malta Rugby Football Union was formally established to administer rugby in Malta. The Malta RFU joined the International Rugby Board in 2000, with the IRB visiting in 2003 to inspect the status of rugby in Malta.

Despite this, the Malta RFU had no national rugby stadium and often rented out association football pitches. In 2005, the IRB made a grant of £50,000 available to assist but due to delays in the Maltese government deciding on it, the grant offer was withdrawn after three years. In 2012, the Malta RFU signed a deal for a new stadium. Construction started in 2013 following the title to the land being transferred to the Malta RFU. In 2022, two further rugby pitches in Marsa were transferred to the Malta RFU by the Government of Malta. On 14 September 2016, Steve Busuttil was elected as President of the Union.

== See also ==
- Rugby union in Malta
- Malta national rugby union team
