= 2008–2010 European Nations Cup Second Division =

International rugby union competition

The European Nations Cup Second division 2008–2010 was the second tier of the European Championship for developing Rugby Union nations.

It was made up of two divisions with 5 teams in each division. Due to changes in the structure of the European Nations Cup for the 2010–2012 competition, no team was relegated from Division 2A or 2B. The winner of Division 2A was promoted to Division One and the winner of Division 2B earned promotion to Division 2A.

The leader of Division 2B at the end of the 2008–2009 season, and the champion of Division 2A at the end of the competition, received the opportunity to participate in qualification for the 2011 Rugby World Cup.

The former champions of Division 2A were Germany who were replaced by the relegated Czech Republic. Poland won Division 2B and were promoted to Division 2A in place of the Netherlands. Sweden was promoted from Division 3A to replace the relegated Andorra.

== Division 2A ==
The tournament was won by Ukraine, which obtained promotion to the highest lever of ENC (Division 1A), as well as qualification to Rugby World Cup Qualification.

Promoted to Division 1 for 2010–2012 and qualified for 2011 RWC Qualifying

Place	Nation	Games				Points			Table points
Place	Nation	played	won	drawn	lost	for	against	difference	Table points
1	Ukraine (27)	8	5	0	3	140	109	+31	18
2	Belgium (31)	8	4	1	3	108	97	+11	17
3	Czech Republic (33)	8	3	1	4	135	142	−7	15
4	Poland (35)	7	3	0	4	94	118	−24	13
5	Moldova (38)	7	3	0	4	133	144	−11	13

- Poland ranked ahead of Moldova due to 30-28 victory in head to head match.

4 October 2008

Poland	12–13	Ukraine

Stadion Widzewa, Łódź
Attendance: 4.000
Referee: Bargaunas (Romania)

1 November 2008

Belgium	9–8	Ukraine

King Baudouin Stadium, Brussels
Attendance: 5.000
Referee: Reinecke (Germany)

15 November 2008

Czech Republic	7–13	Poland

Městský Stadion, Ostrava
Attendance: 1,200
Referee: Villegas (Spain)

15 November 2008

Moldova	20–8	Belgium

Dinamo Stadium, Chisinau
Attendance: 1.500
Referee: Radu Petrescu (Romania)

22 November 2008

Czech Republic	11–9	Moldova

Tatra Smíchov Stadion, Prague
Attendance: 800
Referee: Mourinha (Portugal)

14 March 2009

Belgium	15–15	Czech Republic

King Baudouin Stadium, Brussels
Attendance: 5,000
Referee: Gallastegi (Spain)

21 March 2009

Ukraine	20–10	Czech Republic

Spartak Stadion, Odesa
Attendance: 5.000
Referee: Vlad Iordăchescu (Romania)

9 May 2009

Ukraine	32–0	Moldova

Spartak Stadium, Kyiv
Attendance: 5.000
Referee: M. Hadj Bachir (France)

16 May 2009

Moldova	28–30	Poland

Dinamo Stadium, Chisinau
Attendance: 800
Referee: Soulan (France)

30 May 2009

Poland	14–3	Belgium

Stadion Polonii, Warsaw
Referee: Frasineanu (Romania)

12 September 2009

Ukraine	19–12	Poland

Spartak Stadium, Kyiv
Attendance: 4.000
Referee: De Santis (Italy)

10 October 2009

Ukraine	13–11	Belgium

Spartak Stadium, Kyiv, Ukraine
Attendance: 4.000
Referee: Valin (France)

25 October 2009

Poland	5–19	Czech Republic

Warsaw
Referee: Radu Petrescu (Romania)

31 October 2009

Belgium	14–3	Moldova

King Baudouin Stadium, Brussels
Referee: Mourinha (Portugal)

14 November 2009

Moldova	45–30	Czech Republic

Dinamo Stadium, Chisinau
Referee: Bargaunas (Romania)

3 April 2010

Czech Republic	16–19	Belgium

Prague
Referee: Reineke (Germany)

10 April 2010

Czech Republic	27–16	Ukraine

Prague
Referee: Raduta (Romania)

24 April 2010

Moldova	28–19	Ukraine

Anenii-Noi
Referee: M. Carp (France)

24 April 2010

Belgium	29–8	Poland

Brussels
Referee: M. Villegas (Spain)

- The match between Poland and Moldova was originally scheduled for April 10, 2010, but was postponed after the death of Poland's president, Lech Kaczyński, earlier that day., Then was definitely cancelled.

== Division 2B ==
Promoted to 1B (ex 2A) for 2010–2012. Qualified for 2011 RWC Qualifying

Place	Nation	Games				Points			Table points
Place	Nation	played	won	drawn	lost	for	against	difference	Table points
1	Netherlands (34)	8	7	0	1	219	90	+129	22
2	Croatia (41)	8	6	0	2	161	114	+47	20
3	Malta (54)	8	4	0	4	132	156	−24	16
4	Sweden (51)	8	2	0	6	147	162	−15	12
5	Latvia (61)	8	1	0	7	100	234	−134	10

25 October 2008

Sweden	21–5	Latvia

Vanersborg
Referee: Michalik (Poland)

25 October 2008

Malta	16–18	Croatia

Hibernians Ground, Paola
Referee: Damasco (Italy)

1 November 2008

Netherlands	18–12	Croatia

Amsterdam
Referee: Tuma (Czech Republic)

1 November 2008

Sweden	6–9	Malta

Vanersborg
Referee: Donovan (Denmark)

8 November 2008

Latvia	10–29	Netherlands

Jelgava
Referee: Raduta (Romania)

18 April 2009

Netherlands	36–24	Sweden

Amsterdam
Referee: Marrama (Italy)

18 April 2009

Latvia	19–32	Malta

Riga
Referee: Breburda (Czech Republic)

25 April 2009

Malta	9–27	Netherlands

Hibernians Ground, Paola
Referee: Raynal (France)

25 April 2009

Croatia	21–13	Latvia

Makarska
Referee: De Santis (Italy)

2 May 2009

Croatia	23–13	Sweden

Split
Referee: Hoffman (Portugal)

24 October 2009

Latvia	9–23	Croatia

Riga
Referee: Zeszustek (Poland)

31 October 2009

Croatia	34–14	Malta

Split
Referee: Breburda (Czech Republic)

31 October 2009

Sweden	16–19	Netherlands

Trelleborg
Referee: Narmainidze (Georgia (country))

7 November 2009

Malta	25–23	Sweden

Hibernians Ground, Paola
Referee: Hoffman (Portugal)

7 November 2009

Netherlands	57–3	Latvia

Amsterdam
Referee: Reinecke (Germany)

17 April 2010

Latvia	31–27	Sweden

Riga
Referee: Radu Petrescu (Romania)

17 April 2010

Netherlands	19–0	Malta

Amsterdam
Referee: M. Jassens (Belgium)

24 April 2010

Croatia	16–14	Netherlands

Split
Referee: Frasineau (Romania)

24 April 2010

Malta	27–10	Latvia

Hibernians Ground, Paola
Referee: Mauro Dordolo (Italy)

1 May 2010

Sweden	17–14	Croatia

Enkoping
Referee: Morton (Norway)

== See also ==
- European Nations Cup
- 2008-2010 European Nations Cup First Division
- 2008-2010 European Nations Cup Third Division
