= 2008–2010 European Nations Cup Third Division =

International rugby union competition

The 2008–2010 European Nations Cup (ENC) Third Division (a European rugby union competition for national teams) was contested over two years during which all teams met each other home and away. The Third Division consisted of four levels, which effectively constituted the 5th through 8th levels of European international rugby. The winner of each division was promoted to the next highest division. Due to changes in the competition, the last placed team was not relegated to the next division lower.

The leader of each division (excluding 3D) at the end of the 2008–2009 season received the opportunity to participate in the qualification for the 2011 Rugby World Cup.

The previous champion of Division 3A, Sweden, was promoted to the Second Division and replaced with relegated side Andorra.

== Table – Division 3A ==
Promoted to Division 2B for 2010–2012 and qualified for 2011 RWC Qualifying

Place	Nation	Games				Points			Table points
Place	Nation	played	won	drawn	lost	for	against	difference	Table points
1	Lithuania (37)	7	7	0	0	198	50	+220	21
2	Armenia (UR)	8	4	0	4	151	154	−3	16
3	Serbia (59)	8	3	0	5	92	153	−133	14
4	Andorra (66)	8	3	0	5	122	173	−51	14
5	Switzerland (58)	7	2	0	5	79	112	−33	11

Serbia were ranked ahead of Andorra based on 39–28 aggregate score in their two matches as the series was tied 1–1.

== Matches ==
Date	Match	Result	Venue
2008-09-13	Serbia – Armenia	0–41	Smederevo, Serbia
2008-10-18	Armenia – Switzerland	35–15	Abovyan, Armenia
2008-11-08	Andorra – Lithuania	10–26	Andorra la Vella, Andorra
2008-11-15	Lithuania – Switzerland	33–0	Vilnius, Lithuania
2008-12-06	Serbia – Andorra	32–7	Smederevo, Serbia
2009-03-14	Switzerland – Andorra	32–9	Bern, Switzerland
2009-03-21	Andorra – Armenia	36–10	Andorra la Vella, Andorra
2009-04-04	Switzerland – Serbia	6–12	Nyon, Switzerland
2009-05-02	Lithuania – Serbia	50–9	Vilnius, Lithuania
2009-05-09	Armenia – Lithuania	19–24	Abovyan, Armenia
2009-10-10	Lithuania – Andorra	40–12	Šiauliai, Lithuania
2009-10-24	Serbia – Switzerland	13–8	Belgrade, Serbia
2009-10-31	Lithuania – Armenia	25–0^{1}	Klaipėda, Lithuania
2009-11-22	Switzerland – Armenia	18–0	Switzerland
2009-11-29	Andorra – Serbia	21–7	Andorra la Vella, Andorra
2010-04-03	Armenia – Andorra	26–17	Abovyan, Armenia
2010-04-10	Armenia – Serbia	20–19	Abovyan, Armenia
2010-04-17	Switzerland – Lithuania	Postponed^{2}	Switzerland
2010-04-24	Serbia – Lithuania	5–77^{3}	Serbia
2010-05-08	Andorra – Switzerland	10–0	Andorra la Vella, Andorra

^{1} Armenia were unable to show up for the match due to a pilot's strike in Armenia; Lithuania were awarded a 25–0 victory and Armenia received a point for the loss.
^{2} The match was originally scheduled for 17 April 2010, but was postponed due to the Eyjafjallajökull eruption.
^{3} Lithuania's win in this match set a new world record in men's International Rugby for the most consecutive wins with 18 wins.

== Table – Division 3B ==
Promoted to 3A for 2010–2012 and Qualified for 2011 RWC Qualifying

Place	Nation	Games				Points			Table points
Place	Nation	played	won	drawn	lost	for	against	difference	Table points
1	Slovenia (71)	8	6	0	2	143	121	+22	20
2	Hungary (64)	8	5	0	3	202	146	+56	18
3	Denmark (67)	8	4	0	4	149	148	+1	16
4	Norway (78)	8	3	0	5	111	130	−19	14
5	Austria (92)	8	2	0	6	87	147	−60	12

== Matches ==
Date	Match	Result	Venue
2008-09-13	Slovenia – Hungary	32–26	Ljubljana, Slovenia
2008-09-27	Norway – Hungary	15–26	Ekebergsletta, Oslo, Norway
2008-10-11	Norway – Austria	11–3	Ekebergsletta, Oslo, Norway
2008-10-18	Hungary – Denmark	39–12	Kecskemét, Hungary
2008-11-01	Denmark – Slovenia	19–25	Odense Atletikstadion, Odense, Denmark
2008-11-08	Austria – Slovenia	9–18	Hohe Warte Stadium, Vienna, Austria
2009-04-11	Denmark – Norway	20–18	Odense Atletikstadion, Odense, Denmark
2009-04-18	Hungary – Austria	25–13	Esztergom, Hungary
2009-04-25	Austria – Denmark	6–27	Trauner Stadion, Traun, Austria
2009-04-25	Slovenia – Norway	14–10	Ljubljana, Slovenia
2009-10-10	Hungary – Slovenia	17–11	Pecs, Hungary
2009-10-17	Slovenia – Austria	13–15	Ljubljana, Slovenia
2009-10-17	Norway – Denmark	15–8	Fana stadion, Bergen, Norway
2009-10-31	Denmark – Hungary	27–18	Odense, Denmark
2009-11-14	Austria – Norway	9–12	Vienna, Austria
2010-04-24	Denmark – Austria	24–13	Denmark
2010-05-01	Hungary – Norway	34–17	Esztergom, Hungary
2010-05-15	Slovenia – Denmark	14–12	Ljubljana, Slovenia
2010-05-15	Austria – Hungary	19–17	Vienna, Austria
2010-05-22	Norway – Slovenia	13–16	Aksla Stadion, Ålesund, Norway

== Table – Division 3C ==
Promoted to 3B for 2010–2012 and Qualified for 2011 RWC Qualifying

Place	Nation	Games				Points			Table points
Place	Nation	played	won	drawn	lost	for	against	difference	Table points
1	Israel (81)	8	8	0	0	257	59	+198	24
2	Greece (UR)	8	5	0	3	145	141	+4	18
3	Bulgaria (82)	8	5	0	3	162	162	+0	18
4	Luxembourg (94)	8	2	0	6	96	150	−54	12
5	Finland (95)	8	0	0	8	79	227	−148	8

Greece were ranked ahead of Bulgaria based on 56–36 aggregate score in two head to head matches as the series was drawn 1–1.

== Matches ==
Date	Match	Result	Venue
2008-10-04	Finland – Luxembourg	19–27	Helsinki, Finland
2008-10-11	Finland – Greece	10–12	Helsinki, Finland
2008-11-15	Bulgaria – Israel	8–11	Pernik, Bulgaria
2008-11-22	Greece – Israel	10–25	Zirineio Municipal Stadium, Kifissia, Greece
2008-11-29	Luxembourg – Bulgaria	10–18	Stade Josy Barthel, Luxembourg, Luxembourg
2009-03-21	Israel – Luxembourg	30–0	Wingate Institute, Netanya, Israel
2009-04-11	Greece – Bulgaria	41–18	Alexandroupoli, Greece
2009-04-25	Bulgaria – Finland	29–10	Pernik, Bulgaria
2009-04-25	Luxembourg – Greece	14–17	Stade Josy Barthel, Luxembourg, Luxembourg
2009-05-02	Israel – Finland	70–8	Wingate Institute, Netanya, Israel
2009-10-03	Finland – Bulgaria	13–36	Myllypuro, Helsinki, Finland
2009-10-24	Bulgaria – Luxembourg	25–12	Pernik, Bulgaria
2009-11-07	Luxembourg – Finland	9–3	Stade Josy Barthel, Luxembourg, Luxembourg
2010-02-27	Greece – Finland	31–10	Greece
2010-03-13	Greece – Luxembourg	17–9	Greece
2010-04-10	Israel – Bulgaria	50–10	Wingate Institute, Netanya, Israel
2010-04-17	Israel – Greece	39–0	Wingate Institute, Netanya, Israel
2010-04-24	Bulgaria – Greece	18–15	Pernik, Bulgaria
2010-05-01	Luxembourg – Israel	17–19	Stade Josy Barthel, Luxembourg, Luxembourg
2010-06-12	Finland – Israel	6–13	Myllypuro, Helsinki, Finland

== Table – Division 3D ==
Promoted to 3C for 2010–2012

Place	Nation	Games				Points			Table points
Place	Nation	played	won	drawn	lost	for	against	difference	Table points
1	Cyprus (UR)	6	6	0	0	187	17	+170	18
2	Bosnia and Herzegovina (89)	6	4	0	2	113	48	+65	14
3	Monaco (92)	6	1	0	5	59	153	−94	7
4	Azerbaijan (UR)	6	1	0	5	27	168	−141	5

On 23 September 2009, Slovakia withdrew from the remainder of the competition, and their record was expunged.

== Matches ==
Date	Match	Result	Venue
2008-10-11	Monaco – Bosnia	5–50	Stade Val d'Anaud, Menton, France
2008-11-15	Slovakia – Bosnia	32–46	Slovakia
2008-11-22	Bosnia – Azerbaijan	18–7	Bilino Polje, Zenica, Bosnia
2008-11-29	Azerbaijan – Cyprus	3–37	Sports Academy Stadium, Baku, Azerbaijan
2008-12-06	Cyprus – Monaco	24–3	Episkopi, Cyprus
2009-01-31	Monaco – Azerbaijan	38–12	Saint-Laurent-du-Var, France
2009-03-14	Cyprus – Slovakia	33–7	Cyprus
2009-03-21	Slovakia – Monaco	11–10	Slovakia
2009-03-21	Bosnia – Cyprus	6–8	Zenica, Bosnia
2009-05-09	Azerbaijan – Slovakia	6–0	Baku, Azerbaijan
2009-10-10	Bosnia – Monaco	23–8	Kamberovica polje, Zenica, Bosnia
2009-11-07	Azerbaijan – Bosnia	5–16	Olympic Stadium, Baku, Azerbaijan
2009-11-14	Monaco – Cyprus	5–44	Menton, France
2010-01-30	Azerbaijan – Monaco	6–0 ^{1}	Olympic Stadium, Baku, Azerbaijan
2010-03-06	Cyprus – Azerbaijan	50–0	Paphos, Cyprus
2010-03-27	Cyprus – Bosnia	15–0	Paphos, Cyprus

^{1} Monaco forfeited the match due to player illness; Azerbaijan received a 6–0 win, and Monaco were given a point for the loss.

== See also ==
- European Nations Cup
- 2008-2010 European Nations Cup First Division
- 2008-2010 European Nations Cup Second Division
