= 2008–2010 European Nations Cup First Division =

2008–10 European Nations Cup First Division
- Date: 8 November 2008 – 27 March 2010
- Countries: Georgia; Germany; Portugal; Romania; Russia; Spain

Final positions
- Champions: Georgia (2009); Romania (2010)
- Antim Cup: Georgia (2009); Romania (2010)

Tournament statistics
- Matches played: 30

The 2008–10 European Nations Cup First Division was the 7th edition of the championship since it was reformed in 2000. The championship not only determined the champions of the ENC but it also acted as an element of European qualification for the 2011 Rugby World Cup in New Zealand.

At present, there is no promotion or relegation between the European Nations Cup and the Six Nations. The current champions are Georgia, who won the 2011 First Division.

The top two teams, Georgia and Russia, qualified directly to the 2011 Rugby World Cup, and the third placed team, Romania, entered the European qualification playoffs. These playoffs included the champion of Division 2A and the leaders of the lower ENC divisions (excluding 3D) at the end of the 2008–09 season. Romania emerged as the winner of the playoff series and will go on to play Tunisia, the second place African qualifier, in the semifinals of the Rugby World Cup 2011 20th Place Playoff for the last spot in the 2011 Rugby World Cup finals.

This season saw Germany in the First Division for the first time since the divisional system was created, replacing Czech Republic who were relegated to Division 2A.

The divisions play on a two-year cycle with the teams playing each other both home and away. From 2009 onward, the title is assigned according to a one-year ranking. So Georgia won the 2009 title and Romania the title for 2010. The same for the 2011–12 period.

== Season 2009 ==
Place	Nation	Games				Points			Table points
Place	Nation	played	won	drawn	lost	for	against	difference	Table points
1	Georgia	5	4	1	0	170	80	+90	14
2	Russia	5	4	0	1	162	77	+85	13
3	Portugal	5	3	1	1	124	84	+40	12
4	Romania	5	2	0	3	104	88	+16	9
5	Spain	5	1	0	4	77	151	−74	7
6	Germany	5	0	0	5	22	179	−157	5

Table points are determined as follows:

- 3 points for a win
- 2 points for a draw
- 1 point for a loss
- 0 points for a forfeit

8 November 2008

Russia	42–15	Spain
	Report

Spèarta Stadium., Moscow

15 November 2008

Spain	22–11	Germany
	Report

Univ.Complutense Madrid

7 February 2009

Germany	5–38	Georgia
	Report

Fritz Grunebaum, Heidelberg

7 February 2009

Spain	10–19	Romania
	Report

Univ.Complutense Madrid

7 February 2009

Portugal	14–18	Russia
	Report

Estádio Universitário, Lisbon

14 February 2009

Georgia	20–20	Portugal
	Report

Boris Paichadze Stadium, Tbilisi

14 February 2009

Germany	0–22	Romania
	Report

Fritz Grunebaum, Heidelberg

21 February 2009

Portugal	44–6	Germany
	Report

Estádio Universitário, Lisbon

28 February 2009

Spain	11–55	Georgia
	Report

Univ.Complutense Madrid

28 February 2009

Romania	19–28	Russia
	Report

Stadionul Arcul de Triumf, Bucharest

14 March 2009

Georgia	28–23	Romania
	Report

Boris Paichadze Stadium, Tbilisi, Georgia

15 March 2009

Portugal	24–19	Spain
	Report

Estádio Universitário, Lisbon

21 March 2009

Russia	21–29	Georgia
	Report

Illichivets Stadium, Mariupol, Ukraine

21 March 2009

Romania	21–22	Portugal
	Report

Stadionul Arcul de Triumf, Bucharest

2 May 2009

Germany	0–53	Russia
	Report

Rudolf-Kalweit-Stadion, Hanover

== Season 2010 ==
Place	Nation	Games				Points			Table points
Place	Nation	played	won	drawn	lost	for	against	difference	Table points
1	Romania	5	4	1	0	178	48	+130	14
2	Georgia	5	4	0	1	156	52	+108	13
3	Russia	5	3	1	1	129	98	+27	12
4	Portugal	5	2	0	3	131	65	+66	9
5	Spain	5	1	0	4	68	153	−79	7
6	Germany	5	0	0	5	36	282	−251	5

6 February 2010

Russia	14–10	Portugal
	Report

Slava Metreveli Central Stadium, Sochi

6 February 2010

Georgia	77–3	Germany
	Report

Boris Paichadze Stadium, Tbilisi

13 February 2010

Spain	20–38	Russia
	Report

Univ.Complutense Madrid

13 February 2010

Portugal	10–16	Georgia
	Report

Estádio Universitário, Lisbon

13 February 2010

Romania	67–5	Germany
	Report

Constructorul Cleopatra, Constanţa

27 February 2010

Russia	21–21	Romania
	Report

Slava Metreveli Central Stadium, Sochi

27 February 2010

Germany	0–69	Portugal
	Report

K-u-S Martinsee, Heusenstamm

27 February 2010

Georgia	17–9	Spain
	Report

Boris Paichadze Stadium, Tbilisi, Georgia

13 March 2010

Romania	22–10	Georgia
	Report

Stadionul Arcul de Triumf, Bucharest

13 March 2010

Spain	15–33	Portugal
	Report

Univ.Complutense Madrid

13 March 2010

Russia	48–11	Germany
	Report

Slava Metreveli Central Stadium, Sochi

20 March 2010

Germany	17–21	Spain
	Report

Fritz Grunebaum, Heidelberg

20 March 2010

Georgia	36–8	Russia
	Report

Akçaabat Fatih, Trabzon, Turkey

20 March 2010

Portugal	9–20	Romania
	Report

Estádio Universitário, Lisbon

27 March 2010

Romania	48–3	Spain
	Report

Stadionul Arcul de Triumf, Bucharest
Referee: John Lacey (Ireland)

- The scheduled match between Romania and Spain on February 6, 2010 was postponed due to snow and freezing weather in Bucharest on the planned matchday, and was rescheduled to March 27.

== Table 2008–10 ==
The cumulated table from both years, 2009–2010, decided which teams qualify directly to 2011 Rugby World Cup, which team goes through Play-off qualification rounds and which team is relegated to Division 1B for the 2010–12 season.

Qualified for 2011 Rugby World Cup
Qualified for Round 2
Relegated to 1B for 2010–2012

Place	Nation	Games				Points			Table points
Place	Nation	played	won	drawn	lost	for	against	difference	Table points
1	Georgia	10	8	1	1	328	130	+198	27
2	Russia	10	7	1	2	289	177	+112	25
3	Romania	10	6	1	3	282	136	+146	23
4	Portugal	10	5	1	4	255	149	+106	21
5	Spain	10	2	0	8	151	304	−153	14
6	Germany	10	0	0	10	58	467	−409	10

== See also ==
- European Nations Cup
- 2008–2010 European Nations Cup Second Division
- 2008–2010 European Nations Cup Third Division
- Germany at the 2008–10 European Nations Cup
