= Stompers RFC =

Rugby union club, based in Birkirkara, Malta

- Full name: Stompers Rugby Football Club
- Founded: 1996; 30 years ago
- Location: Birkirkara, Malta
- Ground: Marsa
- President: Ryan Sullivan
- Coach: Dan Moore
- Captain: Jon Jon Micallef
- League: Malta Rugby Union National Championship
Team kit

Stompers RFC is a Maltese rugby club based in Birkirkara. They currently compete in the Malta Rugby Union Championship.

== History ==
The club was founded in 1996.

In season 2015/16, the club signed an agreement with the Kunsill Studenti Universitarji and the Malta University Sports Club to create a reserve team with players drafted from students of the University of Malta. This saw an influx of players, some of whom were eventually called up to the senior team, such as Thomas Bugeja and Andre Farrugia, and for Isaac Bezzina, a former Maltese judo champion, even came a call up to the Malta national rugby union team. Another reserve, Gayle Lynn Callus, entered club management the year after, being elected into committee for a 2016–2018 term.
