= Overseas RUFC =

- Full name: Overseas Rugby Union Football Club
- Founded: 1946
- Location: Marsa, Malta
- League(s): Malta Rugby Union Championship
Team kit

Overseas RUFC is a Maltese rugby club. They currently compete in the Malta Rugby Union Championship.

== History ==
The club was founded in 1946, before disbanding in the 1970s. Then in 1989 the club was re-formed.
