= 2009 South American Rugby Championship "A" =

30° Campeonato Sudamericano de Rugby
Tournament details
- Host: Uruguay
- Date: 15 April– 23 May 2009
- Countries: Argentina; Brazil; Chile; Paraguay; Uruguay

Final positions
- Champions: Argentina
- Runner-up: Uruguay

Tournament statistics
- Matches played: 8

The 2009 South American Rugby Championship was the 31st edition of the two tiered competition of the leading national rugby union teams in South America.

The first phase of division A doubled as round 3A of 2011 Rugby World Cup - Americas qualification for everyone but Paraguay. For this reason, matches against Paraguay did not count in the World Cup standings. The first two of the first phase was admitted to the second phase, keeping the results of their match, with Argentina (holder).

== First phase ==
Team	Played	Won	Drawn	Lost	For	Against	Difference	Points
Uruguay	3	3	0	0	202	19	+183	9
Chile	3	2	0	1	122	63	+59	7
Brazil	3	1	0	2	42	171	−129	5
Paraguay	3	0	0	3	42	155	−113	3

25 April 2009

Chile	79–3	Brazil

Estadio Sausalito, Santiago

25 April 2009

Uruguay	85–7	Paraguay

Estadio Charrúa, Montevideo

29 April 2009

Uruguay	71–3	Brazil

Estadio Charrúa, Montevideo

29 April 2009

Chile	34–13	Paraguay

Estadio Charrúa, Montevideo

2 May 2009

Uruguay	46–9	Chile

Estadio Charrúa, Montevideo

2 May 2009

Brazil	36–21	Paraguay

Estadio Charrúa, Montevideo

== Second phase ==
Team	Played	Won	Drawn	Lost	For	Against	Difference	Points
Argentina XV	3	3	0	0	122	15	+107	6
Uruguay	3	2	0	1	55	42	+13	4
Chile	3	1	0	2	15	135	−130	2

20 May 2009

Argentina XV	89–6	Chile

Montevideo

23 May 2009

Argentina XV	33–9	Uruguay

Montevideo

== Sources ==
- https://web.archive.org/web/20120224072054/http://www.rugbyworldcup.com/qualifying/news/newsid%3D2030944.html#chile+make+winning+start+against+brazil = 25/4/2009 Results
- https://web.archive.org/web/20120224072215/http://www.rugbyworldcup.com/qualifying/news/newsid%3D2031058.html#uruguay+prove+strong+brazil = 29/4/2009 Results
- http://www.rugbydata.com/
- Union Argentina de Rugby (December 2009). "MEMORIA Temporada año 2009" (.pdf) (in Spanish).
- IRB – South American Championship 2009
