= Malta national rugby union team =

Maltese national rugby union team

Malta
- Nickname: L-imtaten (The Rams)
- Emblem: The Ram
- Union: Malta Rugby Football Union
- Head coach: Phil Pretorius
- Captain: Joseph Greaves
First colours

World Rugby ranking
- Current: 38 (as of 20 November 2026)
- Highest: 38 (7 April 2022)
- Lowest: 51 (2025)

First international
- Moldova 58–8 Malta (Chisinau, Moldova; 18 November 2000)

Biggest win
- Malta 89–3 Andorra (Paola, Malta; 24 March 2018)

Biggest defeat
- Lithuania 81–10 Malta (Siauliai, Lithuania; 19 May 2018)

World Cup
- Appearances: 0

The Malta national rugby union team are governed by the Malta Rugby Football Union (MRFU). Although Malta has yet to qualify for the Rugby World Cup, the island state has made remarkable progression since its first international in 2000.

It is currently competing in the Rugby Europe Conference, after topping the Conference 1 South for the past two seasons—2017 and 2018—yet failing to win the play-off to rise to the higher level. The national side is ranked 45th in the world (as of 13 April 2026).

== History ==
Malta's national team played their first match on 18 November 2000, against Moldova in Chişinău, which Moldova won 58–8. They played a subsequent match against Belgium that same year in Marsa, which Belgium won 26–0. Malta played four matches in 2001, and they recorded their first win in the fourth of them, against Monaco in Marsa. This was followed by a draw 10–10 with Norway, defeating Lithuania, Austria, Luxembourg, Bosnia-Herzegovina, Serbia-Montenegro, Latvia and Hungary. They then played Moldova in 2004.

Malta then proceeded to enter the 2007 Rugby World Cup European qualification tournament where they were grouped in Pool D of the second round. After finishing third in their pool with two wins from four pool games, Malta entered a play-off along with Denmark, Andorra and Sweden to enter round three. Malta were successful and entered Pool B of round three.

The team is currently ranked 43rd in the World Rugby world rankings. They are coached by South African Dr Phil Pretorius. Pretorius has led international and domestic teams including Tonga, Czech Republic and Blue Bulls.

Formerly they were coached by welshman Damian Neill, a former Number 8 in the Welsh Premiership with Aberavon RFC and Maesteg RFC.

== Record ==
=== World Cup ===
World Cup record								World Cup Qualification record					
Year	Round	P	W	D	L	F	A	P	W	D	L	F	A
(Australia) (New Zealand) 1987	Not Invited							Not Invited					
(United Kingdom) (Ireland) (France) 1991	did not enter							did not enter					
(South Africa) 1995	did not enter							did not enter					
(Wales) 1999	did not enter							did not enter					
(Australia) 2003	did not qualify							5	0	0	5	27	177
(France) 2007	did not qualify							10	5	0	5	139	200
(New Zealand) 2011	did not qualify							4	2	0	2	66	70
(England) 2015	did not qualify							4	1	0	3	73	104
(Japan) 2019	did not qualify							5	3	1	1	161	97
(France) 2023	did not qualify							Automatically eliminated					
Total	0/9	0	0	0	0	0	0	28	11	1	16	466	648

=== European Competitions ===
Season	Division	G	W	D	L	PF	PA	+/−	Pts	Pos
2001-02	European Nations Cup Third Division Pool 3	3	2	1	0	45	24	+21	8	1st
2002-03	European Nations Cup Third Division Pool B	4	4	0	0	101	54	+47	12	1st
2003-04	European Nations Cup Third Division Pool A	4	3	0	1	73	75	-2	10	2nd
2006-08	European Nations Cup Second Division 2B	8	2	0	6	125	210	-85	12	4th
2008-10	European Nations Cup Second Division 2B	8	4	0	4	132	156	-24	16	3rd
2010-12	European Nations Cup Second Division 2A	8	4	0	4	146	135	+11	20	3rd
2012-14	European Nations Cup Second Division 2A	8	4	0	4	162	179	-17	18	3rd
2014-16	European Nations Cup Second Division 2A	8	3	0	5	153	181	-28	16	4th
2016-17	Rugby Europe Conference 1 South	4	3	1	0	147	49	+98	17	1st
2017-18	Rugby Europe Conference 1 South	4	4	0	0	221	48	+173	20	1st
2018-19	Rugby Europe Conference 1 South	4	3	1	0	117	49	+68	16	1st
2019-20	Rugby Europe Conference 1 South	2	1	0	1	58	32	+26	6	2nd
2021-22	Rugby Europe Conference 1 South	4	3	0	1	69	40	+29	14	2nd
2025-2026	Rugby Europe Conference		3	0	0	121	57	3	19	1st (Promoted to Rugby Europe Trophy)

=== Overall ===
Below is a table of the representative rugby matches played by a Malta national XV at test level up until 14 November 2026, updated after match with Sweden.

Opponent	Played	Won	Lost	Drawn	% Won
Andorra	6	5	1	0	83.33%
Austria	2	2	0	0	100%
Belgium	2	0	2	0	0%
Bosnia and Herzegovina	3	3	0	0	100%
Bulgaria	3	2	1	0	66.67%
Croatia	15	5	8	2	33.33%
Cyprus	9	8	1	0	88.89%
Czech Republic	3	0	3	0	0%
Denmark	3	2	1	0	66.67%
Germany	2	1	1	0	50%
Gibraltar	3	2	1	0	66.67%
Hungary	1	1	0	0	100%
Israel	8	7	1	0	87.5%
Latvia	7	5	2	0	71.43%
Lithuania	7	4	3	0	57.14%
Luxembourg	1	1	0	0	100%
Moldova	2	0	2	0	0%
Monaco	2	1	1	0	50%
Netherlands	4	0	4	0	0%
Norway	1	0	0	1	0%
Poland	3	0	3	0	0%
Serbia and Montenegro	3	2	1	0	66.67%
Slovenia	4	3	1	0	75%
Sweden	5	4	1	0	80%
Switzerland	5	2	3	0	40%
Total	102	59	40	3	57.84%

== Recent Matches ==
Matches

30 October 2021
14:00 CEST (UTC+02)

Slovenia	10–24	Malta
	Report

Oval Ljubljana, Ljubljana
Attendance: 0
Referee: Norbert Matrai (Hungary)

13 November 2021
13:00 CET (UTC+01)

Malta	15–13	Israel (1 LBP)
	Report

Tony Bezzina stadium, Paola
Attendance: 0
Referee: Pedro Mendes-Silva (Portugal)

== Current squad ==
The following players were included in the squad for the 2021–22 Rugby Europe Conference South 1 match against Israel on 13 November 2021.

Note: Flags indicate national union for the club/province as defined by World Rugby.

Player	Position	Date of birth (age)	Caps	Club/province
Rhodri Apsee	Prop			(Wales) Bridgend Ravens
Patrick Martin	Hooker			(Malta) Stompers RFC
Dragan Cerketa	Prop			(Malta) Stompers RFC
Martin Barbara	Lock			(Malta) Falcons RFC
Liam Scicluna	Lock			(Malta) Falcons RFC
Cameron Sultana	Lock			(Wales) Penarth RFC
Benjamin Borg	Flanker			(Malta) Falcons RFC
Daniel Apsee	Flanker			(Wales) Cowbridge RFC
Mark Davey	Number 8			(England) Tonbridge Juddian RFC
Thomas Holloway	Scrum-half			(England) Chester RUFC
Robert Holloway	Fly-half			(England) Sedgley Park RUFC
Brendan Dalton	Wing			(Malta) Falcons RFC
Dominic Busuttil (c)	Centre			
Christopher Dudman	Centre			(England) Rochford Hundred
Jeremy Debattista	Wing			(Malta) Stompers RFC
Richard Gum	Fullback			(Malta) Stompers RFC
Matthew Spiteri	Hooker			(Malta) Stompers RFC
Thomas Davey	Number 8			
Jethro Zammit Randich	Fullback			(Malta) Kavallieri RFC
Jon Jerome Micallef	Lock			(Malta) Stompers RFC
Matthew Camilleri	Centre			(Malta) Stompers RFC
Luke Matthew	Fullback			
Philippe Ioffe	Wing			(Malta) UM Wolves RFC
Terence Galdes	Prop			(Malta) Kavallieri RFC

== Coaches ==
Name	Years	Tests	Won	Lost	Drew
Phil Pretorius	2025 - Present	4	4	0	0
Dominic Busuttil	2025	1	0	1	0
Keith Hopkins	2023–2024	3	3	0	0
Damian Neill	2004–2023	73	38	33	2
Graham Richards	2002–2004	9	7	2	1
Nigal Ben Bennett	2001–2002	4	2	2	0
Len Ethel	2000–2001	3	0	3	0

== See also ==
- List of Malta national rugby union team test matches
- Rugby union in Malta
