= 2011 Rugby World Cup qualifying =

Rugby competition

Tournament details
- Dates: 2007 – 2010
- No. of nations: 79

2011 Rugby World Cup qualifying began at the 2007 tournament in France, where twelve teams (the first three in each of the four pools) earned a place in the finals of the tournament, this automatically qualified them for the 2011 Rugby World Cup in New Zealand.

After much speculation, it was confirmed on 30 November 2007 that 20 teams would contest the next edition of the tournament. The qualification system for the remaining eight places was region-based, with Europe and the Americas allocated two qualifying places, Africa, Asia and Oceania one place each, and the last place determined by a playoff.

With 79 teams participating in regional qualifying competitions, and 12 teams qualifying automatically, 91 nations were involved in the process.

== Qualified teams ==
- Africa
  - Namibia (Africa 1)
  - South Africa (automatic qualifier/champion)
- Americas
  - Argentina (automatic qualifier)
  - Canada (Americas 1)
  - United States (Americas 2)
- Asia
  - Japan (Asia 1)
- Europe
  - England (automatic qualifier)
  - France (automatic qualifier)
  - Georgia (Europe 1)
  - Ireland (automatic qualifier)
  - Italy (automatic qualifier)
  - Russia (Europe 2)
  - Romania (repechage)
  - Scotland (automatic qualifier)
  - Wales (automatic qualifier)
- Oceania
  - Australia (automatic qualifier)
  - New Zealand (automatic qualifier/host)
  - Fiji (automatic qualifier)
  - Tonga (automatic qualifier)
  - Samoa (Oceania 1)

== Regional qualifiers ==
Eight nations qualified from regional competitions: seven qualified directly through their region, and the eighth from a four-nation repechage play-off for the final spot.

Region	Automatic qualifiers	Teams in qualifying process	Qualifying places	Qualifying teams	World Cup pools	Repechage places	Repechage teams
Africa	1	14	1	Namibia	D	1	Tunisia
Americas	1	18	2	Canada; United States	A C	1	Uruguay
Asia	0	11	1	Japan	A	1	Kazakhstan
Europe	6	31	2	Georgia; Russia	B C	1	Romania
Oceania	4	5	1	Samoa	D	0	none
TOTALS	12	79	7			4	(1 WC Place)

=== Final place play-off ===
The twentieth place at the 2011 tournament was determined by a repechage play-off which involved the third-place teams from the American and European qualifying tournaments (Uruguay and Romania). On a home and away basis, Romania prevailed by winning 32–12 in Bucharest, preceded by a 21–21 draw in Montevideo. It competed in Pool B.

Both nations had won the repechage semi-finals. Those were conducted as single matches, with the European and African qualifiers drawn into one semi-final and the Asian and Americas qualifiers drawn into the other. Romania beat Tunisia 56–13 and Uruguay had the upper hand over Kazakhstan winning 44–7. Both matches were hosted by the team with the higher IRB World Ranking when the two teams to play became known.
