= Switzerland national rugby union team =

National rugby union team

Switzerland
- Nickname: Edelweiss (The White Flowers)
- Emblem: Edelweiss
- Union: Fédération Suisse de Rugby
- Head coach: Olivier Nier
- Captain: Cyril Lin
- Home stadium: TBC
First colours	Second colours

World Rugby ranking
- Current: 29 (as of 16 July 2025)
- Highest: 26 (2023)
- Lowest: 67 (2010)

First international
- Switzerland 4–23 Portugal (Neuchâtel, Switzerland; 11 April 1973)

Biggest win
- Bulgaria 9–90 Switzerland (Pernik, Bulgaria; 14 October 2000)

Biggest defeat
- Georgia 110–0 Switzerland (Tbilisi, Georgia; 1 February 2025)
- Website: www.suisserugby.com

The Switzerland national rugby union team, nicknamed The White Flowers (Edelweiss), currently competes in the second division of the Rugby Europe International Championships in the Rugby Europe Trophy, a competition which is just below the Rugby Europe Championship where the top six countries in Europe (apart from the teams in the Six Nations) compete. They are yet to participate in any Rugby World Cup. They often play in all red, while their alternative kit is all white.

== History ==
Switzerland played their first ever international rugby match on April 11, 1973, in Neuchâtel against Portugal, losing 23–4. The following year they lost 10–18 to Belgium, and were then defeated by them 33–3 in 1975. After the second lost to Belgium, Switzerland won their first international rugby match; defeating Serbia-Montenegro 12–3 in Geneva. The only other win for Switzerland during the 1970s was a 7–4 victory over Luxembourg in 1977. In 1979 they were defeated 43–0 by Morocco and 31–0 by Portugal.

They however bounced back in 1980, defeating Luxembourg 10–7 in Berne, though they then lost close matches against Sweden and Belgium, and were again held to nil by Portugal in 1981, but got a victory over Denmark later that year. After losing to Belgium and Sweden in 1982, they then scored 60 unanswered points against Finland. They then lost nine games in a row from 1982 to 1986, then defeating Serbia-Montenegro 5–0 in May 1986.

In 1989, Switzerland attempted to qualify for the 1991 Rugby World Cup in England, playing in the European tournament – Round 2A. They finished third in the final standings of the round, winning one of their three fixtures. Switzerland also participated in the qualifying tournaments for the 1995 Rugby World Cup in South Africa, making it past the preliminary round from the west group, but not advancing past Round 1.

Switzerland finished third (out of six nations) in Pool 1 of Round 1 of the European qualification tournaments for the 1999 Rugby World Cup in Wales, winning and drawing one game out of four fixtures. Switzerland had more success in the qualifying tournaments for the 2003 Rugby World Cup in Australia, finishing at the top of Pool B in Round 1 and advancing to Round 2, but were unable to advance to Round 3. In attempting to qualify for the 2007 Rugby World Cup in France, Switzerland finished fourth in Pool D of Round 2 of the European qualification process.

Switzerland also failed to qualify for the 2011 or 2015 Rugby World Cups.

In 2016 Switzerland reached the second division (Rugby Europe Trophy, formerly Division 1B) of the ENC for the first time since the divisional structure was implemented in 2000, after winning Division 2A over the 2014-16 two-year cycle.

== Record ==
=== World Cup ===
World Cup record								width=1% rowspan=25)	World Cup Qualification record				
Year	Round	P	W	D	L	F	A	P	W	D	L	F	A
(Australia) (New Zealand) 1987	Not Invited							Not Invited					
(United Kingdom) (Ireland) (France) 1991	did not qualify							3	1	0	2	49	74
(South Africa) 1995	did not qualify							5	1	0	4	20	122
(Wales) 1999	did not qualify							4	1	1	2	40	50
(Australia) 2003	did not qualify							9	5	0	4	297	171
(France) 2007	did not qualify							4	1	1	2	77	51
(New Zealand) 2011	did not qualify							6	2	0	4	79	102
(England) 2015	did not qualify							4	3	0	1	92	75
(Japan) 2019	did not qualify							5	3	0	2	140	122
(France) 2023	did not qualify							Automatically eliminated					
(Australia) 2027	did not qualify							2	1	0	4	38	281
Total	0/9	0	0	0	0	0	0	42	18	2	25	832	1048

=== European Competitions Since 2000 ===
Season	Division	G	W	D	L	PF	PA	+/−	Pts	Pos
2000	European Nations Cup Third Division	4	1	0	3	47	60	-13	6	3rd
2002-04	European Nations Cup Second Division Pool B	8	5	3	0	145	95	+50	21	1st
2004-06	European Nations Cup Third Division Pool A	4	1	0	3	34	87	-53	8	3rd
2006-08	European Nations Cup Third Division 3A	8	4	0	4	150	129	+24	16	3rd
2008-10	European Nations Cup Third Division 3A	7	2	0	5	79	112	-33	11	5th
2010-12	European Nations Cup Second Division 2B	8	7	0	1	253	77	+176	34	1st
2012-14	European Nations Cup Second Division 2A	8	4	1	3	170	159	+11	21	2nd
2014-16	European Nations Cup Second Division 2A	8	7	0	1	223	120	+103	33	1st
2016-17	Rugby Europe Trophy	5	3	0	2	140	122	+18	13	3rd
2017-18	Rugby Europe Trophy	5	2	0	3	109	122	-13	11	4th
2018-19	Rugby Europe Trophy	5	3	0	2	108	138	-20	12	3rd
2019-20	Rugby Europe Trophy	5	2	2	1	93	52	+41	14	2nd
2021-22*	Rugby Europe Trophy	5	2	0	3	120	117	+3	9	4th
2022-23*	Rugby Europe Trophy	4	4	0	0	205	72	+133	20	1st
2023-24*	Rugby Europe Trophy	5	5	0	0	198	64	+134	22	1st
2025*	2025 Rugby Europe Championship	4	1	0	4	38	281	-243	0	7th

Men's World Rugby Rankings Top 30 as of 16 November 2026
Rank	Change (Note: Change from the previous week)	Team	Points
1	Steady	South Africa	91.53
2	Steady	New Zealand	90.65
3	▲1	France	89.05
4	▼1	Ireland	88.70
5	Steady	England	86.99
6	Steady	Scotland	85.28
7	Steady	Australia	82.24
8	Steady	Argentina	82.09
9	▲1	Wales	79.37
10	▼1	Fiji	77.79
11	Steady	Italy	75.84
12	Steady	Japan	75.25
13	Steady	Georgia	74.23
14	▲1	United States	68.39
15	▼1	Portugal	68.24
16	▲3	Samoa	67.60
17	▲1	Chile	67.00
18	▼2	Spain	66.53
19	▼2	Tonga	65.58
20	Steady	Uruguay	65.17
21	Steady	Canada	63.38
22	Steady	Belgium	62.00
23	Steady	Romania	61.13
24	Steady	Hong Kong	58.46
25	Steady	Zimbabwe	57.71
26	Steady	Netherlands	56.44
27	Steady	Namibia	56.03
28	Steady	Switzerland	55.47
29	Steady	Czech Republic	55.42
30	Steady	Poland	54.54

Switzerland's historical rankings

Source: World Rugby
Graph updated to 16 November 2026

=== Overall ===
Below is a table of the representative rugby matches played by a Switzerland national XV at test level up until 21 November 2026, updated after match with Tunisia.

Opponent	Played	Won	Drawn	Lost	Win %	For	Aga	Diff
Andorra	7	6	0	1	85.71%	142	88	+54
Armenia	5	3	0	2	60%	107	106	+1
Austria	3	3	0	0	100%	79	32	+47
Basque Country	1	0	0	1	0%	17	56	-39
Belgium	15	4	0	11	28.57%	171	321	–150
Bosnia and Herzegovina	1	1	0	0	100%	43	6	+37
Bulgaria	5	5	0	0	100%	230	36	+194
Croatia	11	8	0	3	72.73%	270	174	+96
Czech Republic	8	3	0	5	37.5%	127	152	–25
Denmark	10	3	2	5	30%	152	180	–28
Finland	1	1	0	0	100%	60	0	+60
Georgia	3	0	0	3	0%	24	186	–162
Germany	9	3	0	6	33.33%	145	239	–94
Hungary	1	1	0	0	100%	61	23	+38
Israel	7	5	2	0	71.43%	171	64	+107
Ivory Coast	2	1	1	0	50%	36	33	+3
Latvia	4	1	0	3	25%	34	82	–48
Lithuania	9	5	0	4	55.56%	246	185	+61
Luxembourg	5	5	0	0	100%	95	29	+66
Malta	5	3	0	2	60%	93	79	+14
Moldova	2	2	0	0	100%	51	46	+5
Monaco	1	1	0	0	50%	20	16	+4
Morocco	1	0	0	1	0%	0	43	–43
Netherlands	10	1	1	8	10%	157	331	–174
Norway	1	1	0	0	100%	30	12	+18
Poland	7	3	0	4	42.86%	148	72	–24
Portugal	7	0	0	7	0%	45	232	–187
Senegal	1	0	0	1	0%	13	27	–14
Serbia	18	5	1	12	27.78%	199	240	–41
Slovenia	5	3	1	1	60%	176	68	+108
Spain	3	0	0	3	0%	27	136	–109
Sweden	8	2	0	6	25%	133	143	–10
Tunisia	3	0	0	3	0%	20	68	–48
Ukraine	6	4	0	2	66.67%	220	118	+102
Total	184	83	8	93	45.11%	3526	3567	-41

== Match Record ==
Matches

15 March 2025
15:45 CET (UTC+1)

Germany	17–20	Switzerland

Fritz-Grunebaum-Sportpark, Heidelberg
Referee: Mike English (Wales)

1 March 2025
20:00 CET (UTC+1)

Belgium	38–5	Switzerland
	Report

Stade du Pachy, Waterloo
Attendance: 1,500
Referee: Alex Frasson (Italy)

15 February 2025
13:00 CET (UTC+1)

Netherlands	73–0	Switzerland
	Report

NRCA Stadium, Amsterdam
Attendance: 2,500
Referee: Paulo Duarte (Portugal)

9 February 2025
13:00 CET (UTC+01)

Switzerland	13–43	Spain
	Report

Stade Municipal, Yverdon-les-Bains
Attendance: 3'800
Referee: Nicolae Fratila (Romania)

2 February 2025
13:00 CET (UTC+01)

Georgia	110–0	Switzerland
	Report

Avchala Stadium, Tbilisi
Attendance: 3'500
Referee: Luis Fernandez (Spain)

2 November 2024
20:00 CET (UTC+01)

Belgium	48–7	Switzerland

13 April 2023
14:00 CET (UTC+01)

Switzerland	68–0	Ukraine
	Report

23 March 2024
14:30 CET (UTC+01)

Switzerland	35–10	Croatia
	Report

9 March 2024
14:00 CET (UTC+01)

Czech Republic	25–41	Switzerland
	Report

11 November 2023
13:00 CET (UTC+01)

Lithuania	17–31	Switzerland
	Report

Klaipėda Central Stadium, Klaipėda
Attendance: 500
Referee: Sulkhan Chikladze (Georgia)

4 November 2023
16:30 CET (UTC+01)

Switzerland	23–12	Sweden
	Report

Stade Municipal, Yverdon-les-Bains
Attendance: n/a
Referee: Killian O'Brien (Germany)

1 April 2023
16:00 CEST (UTC+02)

Croatia	22–32	Switzerland
	Report

Gradski sportski centar, Makarska
Attendance: 3'000
Referee: Killian O'Brien (Germany)

11 March 2023
14:00 CEST (UTC+02)

Ukraine	32–59	Switzerland
	Report

Stadion NŠC Stjepan Spajić, Zagreb
Attendance: 150
Referee: Anthony Lac (Monaco)

12 November 2022
15:00 CET (UTC+01)

Switzerland	45–6	Lithuania
	Report

Stade Juan Antonio Samaranch, Lausanne
Attendance: 650
Referee: John Catteau (Belgium)

5 November 2022
14:00 CET (UTC+01)

Sweden	12–69	Switzerland
	Report

Malmö Stadion, Malmö
Attendance: 200
Referee: Ignacio Munoz-Martin (Spain)

30 April 2022

Ukraine	0–28	Switzerland

19 March 2022

Germany	34–25	Switzerland

12 March 2022

Switzerland	22–18	Belgium

20 November 2021
14:30 CET (UTC+01)

Poland	37–25	Switzerland
	Report

Stadion Miejski, Warsaw
Referee: Eki Fanlo (Spain)

13 November 2021
15:30 CET (UTC+01)

Switzerland	20–28	Lithuania
	Report

Centre Sportif de Colovray, Nyon
Referee: Dan O'Connell (Germany)

29 February 2020

Germany	20–33	Switzerland

23 November 2019

Switzerland	20–23	Poland

16 November 2019

Lithuania	9–40	Switzerland

13 April 2019

Switzerland	34–24	Lithuania

23 March 2019

Poland	25–28	Switzerland

16 March 2019

Switzerland	14–48	Portugal

24 February 2019

Switzerland	6–6	Ivory Coast

24 November 2018

Netherlands	36–15	Switzerland

17 November 2018

Switzerland	17–5	Czech Republic

17 March 2018

Switzerland	30–24	Poland

10 March 2018

Czech Republic	17–10	Switzerland

24 February 2018

Portugal	31–17	Switzerland

3 February 2018

Switzerland	30–27	Ivory Coast

25 November 2017

Moldova	20–22	Switzerland

18 November 2017

Switzerland	27–30	Netherlands

22 April 2017

Poland	12–22	Switzerland

18 March 2017

Netherlands	38–25	Switzerland

12 March 2017

Switzerland	54–18	Ukraine

26 November 2016

Switzerland	29–26	Moldova

19 November 2016

Switzerland	10–28	Portugal

16 April 2016

Croatia	15–40	Switzerland

9 April 2016

Switzerland	29–3	Malta

14 November 2015

Switzerland	28–3	Israel

24 October 2015

Czech Republic	14–20	Switzerland

25 April 2015

Malta	20–23	Switzerland

18 April 2015

Switzerland	40–20	Croatia

1 November 2014

Switzerland	14–27	Croatia

25 October 2014

Israel	18–29	Switzerland

26 April 2014

Lithuania	24–18	Switzerland

12 April 2014

Switzerland	14–29	Malta

16 November 2013

Switzerland	20–20	Netherlands

2 November 2013

Croatia	11–26	Switzerland

13 April 2013

Switzerland	37–21	Lithuania

6 April 2013

Malta	10–19	Switzerland

17 November 2012

Netherlands	24–7	Switzerland

3 November 2012

Switzerland	29–20	Croatia

17 March 2012

Switzerland	85–0	Slovenia

26 November 2011

Andorra	21–22	Switzerland

12 November 2011

Switzerland	27–19	Serbia

30 April 2011

Slovenia	10–33	Switzerland

19 March 2011

Switzerland	21–9	Andorra

20 November 2010

Serbia	18–15	Switzerland

2 October 2010

Switzerland	30–27	Armenia

8 May 2010

Andorra	10–0	Switzerland

22 November 2009

Switzerland	18–0	Armenia

24 October 2009

Serbia	13–8	Switzerland

4 April 2009

Switzerland	6–12	Serbia

14 March 2009

Switzerland	32–9	Andorra

15 November 2008

Lithuania	33–0	Switzerland

18 October 2008

Armenia	35–15	Switzerland

19 April 2008

Switzerland	16–28	Sweden

5 April 2008

Denmark	13–28	Switzerland

24 November 2007

Serbia	5–13	Switzerland

3 November 2007

Netherlands	40–12	Switzerland

6 October 2007

Switzerland	15–28	Armenia

5 May 2007

Sweden	6–0	Switzerland

31 March 2007

Switzerland	22–24	Denmark

7 October 2006

Switzerland	30–9	Serbia

30 September 2006

Armenia	16–29	Switzerland

16 September 2006

Switzerland	10–40	Germany

6 May 2006

Austria	3–17	Switzerland

22 April 2006

Sweden	35–3	Switzerland

3 December 2005

Switzerland	8–7	Denmark

26 November 2005

Latvia	42–6	Switzerland

19 March 2005

Serbia and Montenegro	11–11	Switzerland

12 March 2005

Switzerland	40–3	Bulgaria

16 October 2004

Switzerland	8–17	Malta

2 October 2004

Poland	20–15	Switzerland

17 April 2004

Switzerland	21–18	Slovenia

27 March 2004

Belgium	3–32	Switzerland

25 October 2003

Croatia	5–11	Switzerland

11 October 2003

Switzerland	12–12	Denmark

10 May 2003

Slovenia	23–23	Switzerland

8 March 2003

Switzerland	9–6	Belgium

9 November 2002

Switzerland	24–15	Croatia

26 October 2002

Denmark	13–13	Switzerland

24 November 2001

Switzerland	11–30	Ukraine

11 November 2001

Croatia	18–16	Switzerland

27 October 2001

Belgium	15–22	Switzerland

6 October 2001

Switzerland	6–32	Czech Republic

25 May 2001

Serbia and Montenegro	13–10	Switzerland

12 May 2001

Switzerland	61–23	Hungary

5 May 2001

Switzerland	38–25	Andorra

14 October 2000

Bulgaria	9–90	Switzerland

7 October 2000

Switzerland	43–6	Bosnia and Herzegovina

15 April 2000

Tunisia	40–6	Switzerland

1 April 2000

Poland	15–8	Switzerland

4 March 2000

Belgium	18–11	Switzerland

13 November 1999

Switzerland	10–5	Latvia

16 October 1999

Switzerland	18–22	Czech Republic

19 June 1999

Austria	26–31	Switzerland

10 April 1999

Monaco	16–20	Switzerland

3 April 1999

Switzerland	40–7	Israel

21 November 1998

Switzerland	48–8	Bulgaria

26 September 1998

Andorra	14–15	Switzerland

15 May 1998

Switzerland	21–23	Lithuania

9 May 1998

Latvia	25–18	Switzerland

28 March 1998

Israel	3–34	Switzerland

8 November 1997

Switzerland	29–13	Serbia and Montenegro

24 May 1997

Switzerland	31–3	Austria

1 March 1997

Serbia and Montenegro	8–0	Switzerland

30 November 1996

Israel	9–9	Switzerland

2 November 1996

Switzerland	0–38	Ukraine

30 April 1995

Luxembourg	Match conceded by Switzerland	Switzerland

2 November 1994

Slovenia	17–14	Switzerland

30 October 1994

Croatia	11–3	Switzerland

4 June 1994

Switzerland	21–22	Georgia

14 May 1994

Luxembourg	8–17	Switzerland

6 November 1993

Latvia	10–0	Switzerland

15 May 1993

Belgium	42–3	Switzerland

13 May 1993

Portugal	32–0	Switzerland

11 May 1993

Spain	40–0	Switzerland

1 May 1993

Switzerland	37–10	Luxembourg

31 October 1992

Andorra	0–14	Switzerland

26 October 1992

Denmark	8–3	Switzerland

26 September 1992

Switzerland	27–3	Bulgaria

27 February 1992

Germany	37–0	Switzerland

4 May 1989

Sweden	33–15	Switzerland

2 May 1989

Denmark	26–12	Switzerland

30 April 1989

Israel	15–22	Switzerland

16 November 1986

Switzerland	3–4	Yugoslavia (Serbia)

18 October 1986

Switzerland	25–13	Bulgaria

31 May 1986

Denmark	36–4	Switzerland

27 May 1986

Switzerland	0–4	Yugoslavia (Serbia)

6 April 1986

Switzerland	10–28	Netherlands

6 December 1985

(Serbia) Yugoslavia	13–6	Switzerland

1 December 1985

Switzerland	10–18	West Germany

20 April 1985

Netherlands	19–12	Switzerland

31 March 1985

West Germany	30–12	Switzerland

23 April 1983

Switzerland	9–14	Czech Republic

5 March 1983

Switzerland	9–23	Belgium

12 December 1982

Tunisia	3–0	Switzerland

27 November 1982

(Serbia) Yugoslavia	36–19	Switzerland

22 May 1982

Finland	0–60	Switzerland

20 May 1982

Sweden	10–3	Switzerland

6 March 1982

Belgium	10–6	Switzerland

27 November 1981

Switzerland	0–10	Yugoslavia (Serbia)

24 October 1981

Switzerland	34–21	Denmark

25 May 1981

Switzerland	9–9	Israel

11 April 1981

Switzerland	16–20	Denmark

28 February 1981

Portugal	39–0	Switzerland

29 November 1980

Belgium	7–0	Switzerland

1 November 1980

Switzerland	4–7	Sweden

19 April 1980

Switzerland	10–7	Luxembourg

23 June 1979

Switzerland	30–12	Norway

27 March 1979

Portugal	31–0	Switzerland

25 March 1979

Morocco	43–0	Switzerland

28 October 1978

Switzerland	0–18	West Germany

14 May 1977

Luxembourg	4–7	Switzerland

16 April 1977

Switzerland	16–25	Belgium

11 December 1976

Switzerland	6–18	Yugoslavia (Serbia)

25 April 1976

(Serbia) Yugoslavia	31–4	Switzerland

16 November 1975

Switzerland	6–23	Czech Republic

12 June 1975

Switzerland	12–3	Yugoslavia (Serbia)

19 April 1975

Belgium	11–3	Switzerland

8 June 1974

Switzerland	10–18	Belgium

11 April 1973

Switzerland	4–23	Portugal

== Current squad ==
The following players have been selected for the 2022–23 Rugby Europe Trophy.

- Head Coach: (France) Olivier Nier

Caps update: 22 November 2021

Note: Flags indicate national union for the club/province as defined by World Rugby.

Player	Position	Date of birth (age)	Caps	Club/province
Reuben Bachofner-Brown	Prop	2 May 1996 (age 30)	1	(England) Hornets RFC
Maximiliano Ducommun	Prop	20 March 1992 (age 34)	3	(Switzerland) Nyon RC
Cameron Holestein	Prop	11 March 1995 (age 31)	3	(England) Hartpury University
Vincent Vial	Prop	21 June 1994 (age 32)	14	(France) CS Vienne
Alexandre Grillon	Prop	14 February 1992 (age 34)	2	(Switzerland) Lausanne University
Dominic Gorman	Prop	23 November 1997 (age 28)	17	(Switzerland) Yverdon RC
Nathan Pelsy	Hooker	7 March 1997 (age 29)	18	(France) US Annecy
Maxime Luçon	Hooker	19 July 1991 (age 35)	30	(France) CA Pontarlier
Manu Ronza	Hooker	2 April 1997 (age 29)	13	(Switzerland) Lausanne University
Andri Koeferli	Hooker	4 September 1999 (age 27)	3	(Switzerland) GC Zürich
Christian Rohrig	Lock	7 December 1990 (age 35)	10	(Switzerland) GC Zürich
Ben Bodinham	Lock	7 June 1991 (age 35)	5	(England) Oxford Quins R.F.C.
Romin Vivarie	Lock	18 November 1992 (age 34)	2	(Switzerland) Lausanne University
Antoine Salino	Back row	15 November 2000 (age 26)	2	(Switzerland) Servette RC
Tim Vögtli	Back row	13 June 1994 (age 32)	23	(Switzerland) GC Zürich
George Hallam	Back row	26 April 2003 (age 23)	2	(England) Coventry Academy
Cyril Lin (c)	Back row	17 August 1984 (age 42)	42	(Switzerland) Nyon RC
Nicolas Lugeon	Back row	9 June 1994 (age 32)	5	(Switzerland) Stade Lausanne RC
Ahmed Kane	Back row	5 July 2001 (age 25)	2	(France) Lyon
William Meyer	Scrum-half	28 September 2000 (age 26)	6	(France) Rumilly
Simon Perrod	Scrum-half	14 July 1990 (age 36)	36	(France) Drancy RC
Donovan O'Grady	Scrum-half	16 February 1993 (age 33)	16	(England) Eton Manor RFC
Jules Porcher	Fly-half	1 July 1998 (age 28)	9	(France) RC Aubenas Vals
Jess Roberson	Centre	4 August 1992 (age 34)	4	(Switzerland) GC Zürich
Tommaso Volta	Centre	11 January 2000 (age 26)	4	(Switzerland) Hermance RRC
Gaëtan Moser	Centre	25 May 2001 (age 25)	1	(Switzerland) Servette RC
Lucas Heinrich	Wing	13 June 1995 (age 31)	29	(Switzerland) Servette RC
Hugo Malyon	Wing	25 July 1995 (age 31)	9	(France) RC Suresnes
Hugh Kisielewski	Wing	8 May 1990 (age 36)	10	(Switzerland) GC Zürich
Jolan Vincent	Fullback	12 January 2002 (age 24)	6	(France) US Nantua Haut Bugey

== Current coaching staff ==
The current coaching staff of the Swiss national team:

Name	Nationality	Role
Yann Benoit	SUI	Manager
Olivier Nier	(France) FRA	Head coach
Mathieu Guyou Kreis	SUI	Backs Coash
Simon Dupuy	SUI	Forwards Coach
Dr Mathieu Saubade	SUI	Team doctor
Gregory Tellier	SUI	Physiotherapist

== See also ==
- Rugby union in Switzerland
