= Belgium national rugby union team =

National rugby union team

Belgium
- Nickname: Diables Noirs / Zwarte Duivels (Black Devils)
- Union: Belgian Rugby Federation
- Head coach: Laurent Dossat
- Captain: Jens Torfs
- Most caps: Alan Williams (68)
- Top scorer: Alan Williams (736)
- Top try scorer: Julien Berger (15)
- Home stadium: Various
First colours	Second colours

World Rugby ranking
- Current: 21 (as of 19 June 2026)
- Highest: 21 (2012, 2013, 2026)
- Lowest: 55 (2004)

First international
- Netherlands 6–6 Belgium (Amsterdam, Netherlands; 13 March 1932)

Biggest win
- United Arab Emirates 3–94 Belgium (Dubai, United Arab Emirates; 8 December 2012)

Biggest defeat
- Spain 77–0 Belgium (Madrid, Spain; 8 December 1996)
- Website: www.rugby.be

The Belgium national rugby union team, nicknamed Diables Noirs / Zwarte Duivels (Black Devils), currently competes in the first division of the Rugby Europe International Championships, which they have been playing in since 2023. They have yet to participate in a Rugby World Cup. Rugby union in Belgium is administered by the Belgian Rugby Federation.

== History ==
The Belgium rugby team played their first match on 13 March 1932 against the Netherlands. They contested annual games against the Netherlands for half a decade starting in 1932. They drew the 1932 game, but lost subsequent matches during the 1930s. They also played Italy and Germany in 1937, losing both games.

During the 1950s, Belgium continued playing the Netherlands, as well as teams like Spain. They managed to obtain a draw in the 1960s against Portugal. In the 1970s they won the majority of their games, as well as playing a broader range of European nations. This trend continued throughout the 1980s. Belgium had a six-game winning streak in the late 1980s. They began playing more games against their regular European opponents as they entered the 1990s. A Belgium side played Argentina prior to the 2007 Rugby World Cup. A Belgium XV played the Barbarians on 24 May 2008.

Belgium has been steadily improving, ranked number 55th in 2004, the 'Black Devils' improved on the following years, obtaining good results against other European Nations, gaining entry to the IRB Ranking's Top 30 in 2010. Since their induction to the first 30 rugby nations in the international ranking, they have managed to maintain their place.

Belgium had a successful campaign during the 2010-2012 European Nations Cup, with a 10 match winning streak from March 2011 to December 2012. Following their promotion in 2023, Belgium is competing in the top division of the Rugby Europe International Championships. In the 2024 season of the Rugby Europe International Championships Belgium earned a historic win over Portugal following their impressive Rugby World Cup campaign.

Belgium narrowly failed to qualify for the 2027 Men's Rugby World Cup following a 13-13 draw against Samoa in the final qualifying tournament.

Jacques Rogge, the former International Olympic Committee president, was a member of the Belgium national team.

== Rugby World Cup qualification ==
World Cup record								World Cup Qualification record					
Year	Round	P	W	D	L	F	A	P	W	D	L	F	A
(Australia) (New Zealand) 1987	Not invited							-					
(United Kingdom) (Republic of Ireland) (France) 1991	did not enter							did not enter					
(South Africa) 1995	did not qualify												
(Wales) 1999	did not qualify												
(Australia) 2003	did not qualify												
(France) 2007	did not qualify												
(New Zealand) 2011	did not qualify												
(England) 2015	did not qualify												
(Japan) 2019	did not qualify												
(France) 2023	did not qualify												
(Australia) 2027	did not qualify												
Total	-												

== Current squad ==
On 27 October, Belgium named a 31-player squad ahead of the 2027 Rugby World Cup Final Qualification Tournament.

Head Coach: (France) Laurent Dossat

- Caps Updated: 13 November 2025 (after Belgium v Brazil)

Player	Position	Date of birth (age)	Caps	Club/province
Alexandre Raynier	Hooker	16 March 1994 (age 32)	21	(France) Auch
Vincent Tauzia	Hooker	17 July 1992 (age 34)	13	(France) Martres de Veyre
Charlesty Berguet	Prop	13 January 2000 (age 26)	13	(France) Vannes
Jean-Baptiste de Clercq	Prop	23 February 1994 (age 32)	17	(France) Albi
Maxime Jadot	Prop	6 January 1991 (age 35)	56	(France) Emak Hor
Basile van Parys	Prop	30 June 2000 (age 26)	14	(Belgium) Brussels Devils
Seppe Verelst	Prop		6	(Belgium) Brussels Devils
Bruno Vliegen	Prop	3 July 2001 (age 25)	17	(France) Olympique Marcquois
Gillian Benoy	Lock	8 May 1995 (age 31)	31	(France) Béziers
Maurice Fromont	Lock	10 September 2003 (age 23)	9	(France) Stade Métropolitain
Maximilien Hendrickx	Lock	21 May 1997 (age 29)	27	(France) Suresnes
Jérémie Brasseur	Back row	3 July 2000 (age 26)	14	(France) Orléans
Toon Deceuninck	Back row	13 December 2000 (age 25)	24	(France) Auch
Jean-Maurice Decubber	Back row	10 September 1996 (age 30)	20	(France) Angoulême
Felipe Geraghty	Back row	27 February 1993 (age 33)	7	(Belgium) Brussels Devils
Lucas Rassinfosse	Back row	23 February 2001 (age 25)	14	(France) Anglet
William Van Bost	Back row	1 August 1998 (age 28)	14	(France) Béziers
Julien Berger	Scrum-half	10 January 1990 (age 36)	65	(France) La Roche-sur-Yon
Isaac Montoisy	Scrum-half	9 September 1998 (age 28)	19	(France) Salles
Timothé Rifon	Scrum-half	12 September 2001 (age 25)	13	(France) Mâcon
Hugo De Francq	Fly-half	13 May 1998 (age 28)	20	(Portugal) Agronomia
Matias Remue	Fly-half	7 March 2003 (age 23)	13	(France) Toulouse Espoirs
Florian Remue	Centre	7 March 2003 (age 23)	27	(France) Valence d’Agen
Jens Torfs	Centre	26 May 1992 (age 34)	39	(France) Barbezieux
Maxime Vacquier	Centre	15 January 2003 (age 23)	7	(France) Béziers
Robin Wedlake	Centre	16 August 1994 (age 32)	0	(England) Camborne
Dazzy Cornez	Wing	2 May 1996 (age 30)	25	(France) Aubenas
Lucas Michiels	Wing	25 March 2004 (age 22)	4	(Spain) Alcobendas
Ervin Muric	Wing	3 January 1997 (age 29)	19	(France) Olympique Marcquois
Thomas Wallraf	Wing	21 January 1998 (age 28)	32	(France) Langon
Siméon Soenen	Fullback	3 January 2003 (age 23)	15	(France) Albi

== Record ==
Men's World Rugby Rankings Top 30 as of 16 November 2026
Rank	Change (Note: Change from the previous week)	Team	Points
1	Steady	South Africa	91.53
2	Steady	New Zealand	90.65
3	▲1	France	89.05
4	▼1	Ireland	88.70
5	Steady	England	86.99
6	Steady	Scotland	85.28
7	Steady	Australia	82.24
8	Steady	Argentina	82.09
9	▲1	Wales	79.37
10	▼1	Fiji	77.79
11	Steady	Italy	75.84
12	Steady	Japan	75.25
13	Steady	Georgia	74.23
14	▲1	United States	68.39
15	▼1	Portugal	68.24
16	▲3	Samoa	67.60
17	▲1	Chile	67.00
18	▼2	Spain	66.53
19	▼2	Tonga	65.58
20	Steady	Uruguay	65.17
21	Steady	Canada	63.38
22	Steady	Belgium	62.00
23	Steady	Romania	61.13
24	Steady	Hong Kong	58.46
25	Steady	Zimbabwe	57.71
26	Steady	Netherlands	56.44
27	Steady	Namibia	56.03
28	Steady	Switzerland	55.47
29	Steady	Czech Republic	55.42
30	Steady	Poland	54.54

Belgium's historical rankings

Source: World Rugby
Graph updated to 16 November 2026

Below is a table of the representative rugby matches played by a Belgium national XV at test level up until 31 October 2026, updated after match with Hong Kong.

Opponent	Played	Won	Lost	Drawn	Win %
Armenia	1	0	1	0	0%
Barbarians	1	0	1	0	0%
Brazil	3	1	2	0	33.33%
Canada	4	1	3	0	25%
Chile	1	0	1	0	0%
Croatia	4	2	2	0	50%
Czech Republic	7	4	2	1	57.14%
Czechoslovakia	6	1	5	0	16.67%
Denmark	5	3	1	1	60%
Fiji	1	0	1	0	0%
France A	3	0	3	0	0%
Georgia	6	0	6	0	0%
Germany	15	8	6	1	53.33%
Hong Kong	5	2	3	0	40%
Italy	2	0	2	0	0%
Latvia	2	1	1	0	50%
Lithuania	3	3	0	0	100%
Luxembourg	4	4	0	0	100%
Malta	2	2	0	0	100%
Moldova	7	5	2	0	71.43%
Monaco	1	1	0	0	100%
Morocco	8	1	7	0	12.5%
Namibia	1	1	0	0	100%
Netherlands	50	25	21	4	50%
Paraguay	1	1	0	0	100%
Poland	15	6	9	0	40%
Portugal	19	4	14	1	21.05%
Romania	12	0	12	0	0%
Russia	7	1	6	0	14.29%
Samoa	2	0	1	1	0%
Serbia and Montenegro	1	1	0	0	100%
Slovenia	3	2	1	0	66.67%
Spain	17	2	14	1	11.76%
Sweden	12	8	4	0	66.67%
Switzerland	12	8	4	0	66.67%
Tunisia	5	1	3	1	20%
Ukraine	6	3	3	0	50%
United Arab Emirates	1	1	0	0	100%
United States	1	0	1	0	0%
Uruguay	1	0	1	0	0%
Yugoslavia	7	6	1	0	85.71%
West Germany	6	4	1	1	66.67%
Zimbabwe	1	1	0	0	100%
Total	271	113	146	12	41.7%

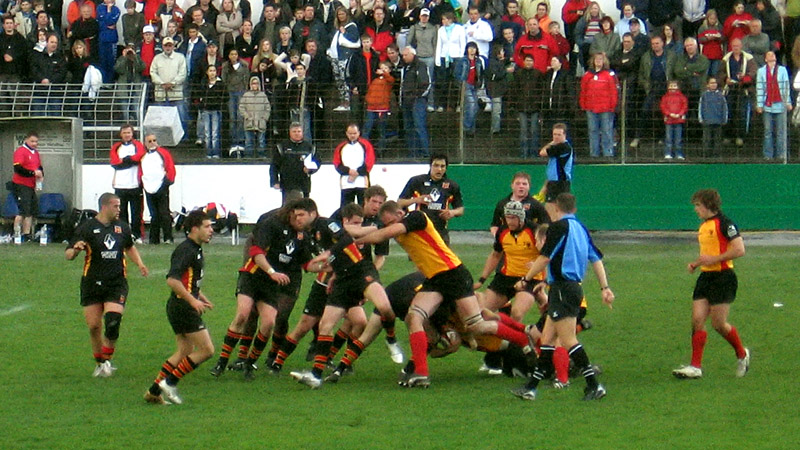
Germany playing Belgium in Qualifiers for the 2007 Rugby World Cup

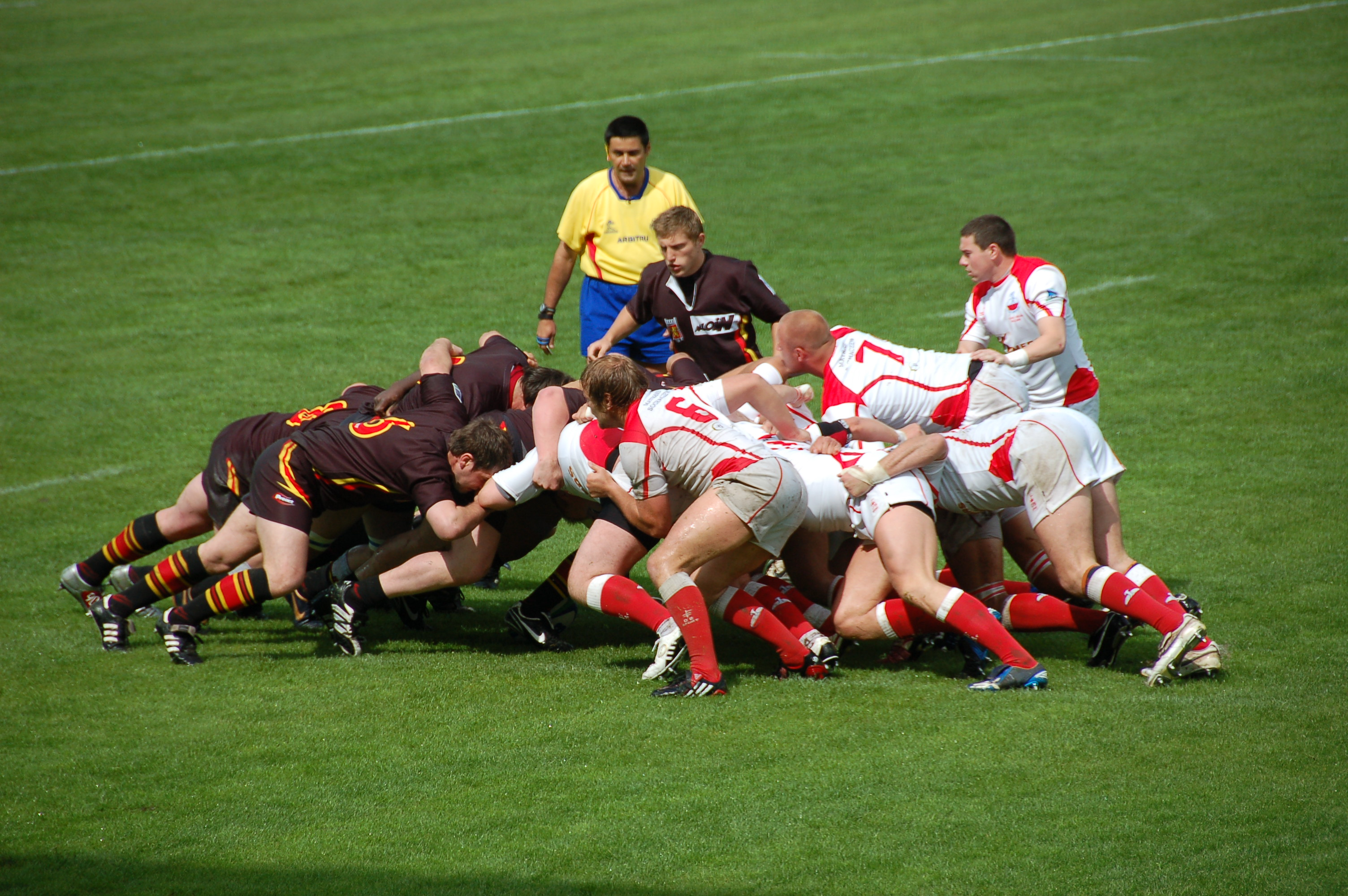
Poland playing Belgium in Qualifiers for the 2011 Rugby World Cup

== Past coaches ==
Years	Coach
2004–2014	(France) Richard McClintock
2014–2019	(France) Guillaume Ajac
2020–2022	(France) Frédéric Cocqu
2022	(England) Chris Cracknell
2023	(England) Mike Ford
2024–present	(France) Laurent Dossat

== See also ==
- Rugby union in Belgium
