= 2000–01 European Nations Cup First Division =

International rugby union competition

2001 European Nations Cup
- Date: 4 February – 8 April 2001
- Countries: Georgia; Netherlands; Portugal; Romania; Russia; Spain

Tournament statistics
- Champions: Georgia
- Grand Slam: Georgia
- Matches played: 15
- Tries scored: 87 (5.8 per match)

The 2001 European Nations Cup was the second annual competition for tier 2 and 3 European rugby union nations. The competition was originally planned to continue on an annual basis like the Six Nations but at the end of the season it was decided to change to a two-year cycle allowing home and away games.

The results of this season were added to the 2001–02 European Nations Cup First Division standings. Georgia won their first ever European Championship, which was overshadowed slightly by Romania winning the extended championship the following year. Morocco no longer would be taking part in this competition and were replaced by Russia.

== Table ==
Place	Nation	Games				Points			Table points
Place	Nation	Played	Won	Drawn	Lost	For	Against	Difference	Table points
1	Georgia	5	5	0	0	167	68	+99	15
2	Romania	5	4	0	1	188	71	+117	13
3	Russia	5	3	0	2	152	143	+9	11
4	Spain	5	2	0	3	118	131	−13	9
5	Portugal	5	1	0	4	77	165	−88	7
6	Netherlands	5	0	0	5	60	184	−124	5

== Matches ==
=== Week 1 ===
4 February 2001

Netherlands	3–32	Georgia
Pen: Viguurs		Try: Didebulidze (2); Khekhelashvili; Yachvili; Con: Jimsheladze (3); Pen: Jimsheladze (2)

Nationaal Rugby Centrum, Amsterdam
Attendance: 1,200
Referee: Rossano Faccioli (Italy)

4 February 2001

Portugal	0–47	Romania
		Try: Manta (3); Mitu; Oprea; Con: Mitu (2); Pen: Mitu (6)

Lisbon University Stadium, Lisbon
Attendance: 1,000
Referee: Bernd Gabbei (Germany)

4 February 2001

Spain	29–30	Russia
Try: Velazco Querol; Pen: Alonso (5); Kovalenco (3)		Try: Grachev; Nikolaychuk; Zakarlyuk; Con: Simonov (2); Pen: Simonov (2)

Campo Universitário, Madrid
Attendance: 5,000
Referee: Jean-Pierre Pellaprat (France)

=== Week 2 ===
17 February 2001

Georgia	36–12	Portugal
Try: Abuseridze; Bolgashvili; Zedginidze (2); Zibzibadze (2); Con: Jimsheladze (3)		Pen: Malheiro (3); Drop: Malheiro

Boris Paichadze National Stadium, Tbilisi
Attendance: 7,000
Referee: Stefano Mancini (Italy)

18 February 2001

Spain	12–27	Romania
Pen: Kovalenco (4)		Try: Bălan; Brezoianu; Ghioc; Con: Mitu (3); Pen: Mitu (2)

Estadio Olímpico de la Cartuja, Seville
Attendance: 3,000
Referee: Giovanni Morandin (Italy)

18 February 2001

Netherlands	20–41	Russia
Try: Lips; Staats; Con: Viguurs (2); Pen: Viguurs unknown		Try: Bibkov; Kuzin; Rachkov; Sergeev; Shelepkov; Uanbayev; Zakarlyuk; Con: Rachkov (3)

Nationaal Rugby Centrum, Amsterdam
Attendance: 2,500

=== Week 3 ===
4 March 2001

Russia	23–25	Georgia
Try: Grachev; Kashcheev; Klimenko; Con: Rachkov; Pen: Simonov (2)		Try: Labadze; Zedginidze; Penalty try Con: Jimsheladze (2); Pen: Jimsheladze (2)

Stadium Junost, Krasnodar
Referee: Daniel Pruvot (France)

4 March 2001

Romania	52–15	Netherlands
Try: Bălan; Ciolacu (2); Corodeanu; Iacob; Maftei; Mitu; Tonița; Con: Mitu (6)		Try: Schumacher (2); Con: Viguurs; Pen: Viguurs

Stade 1 Mai, Constanta
Attendance: 3,000
Referee: Bernd Gabbei (Germany)

4 March 2001

Spain	31–15	Portugal
Try: Enciso; Justel; Souto; Con: Kovalenco (2); Pen: Kovalenco (4)		Pen: Cather (4); Drop: Cather

Campo Universitário, Madrid
Referee: Nicolas Lasaga (France)

=== Week 4 ===
18 March 2001

Georgia	43–10	Spain
Try: Abashidze; Giorgadze; Katsadze; Shvelidze; Urjukashvili; Penalty try Con: Jimsheladze (5); Pen: Jimsheladze		Try: Souto; Con: Alonso; Pen: Kovalenco

Rustavi Rugby Stadium, Rustavi
Attendance: 12,000
Referee: Adrian Malartic (France)

18 March 2001

Romania	42–13	Russia
Try: Bălan; Corodeanu; Mitu; Socol; Solomie; Con: Mitu (4); Pen: Mitu (3)		Try: Dyatlov; Con: Yakovlev; Pen: Yakovlev (2)

Stadionul Municipal, Bârlad
Attendance: 9,000
Referee: Stefano Mancini (Italy)

18 March 2001

Portugal	23–6	Netherlands
Try: King; Pinto; Con: Cather (2); Pen: Cather (3)		Pen: De Schutter (2)

Lisbon University Stadium, Lisbon

=== Week 5 ===
7 April 2001

Russia	45–27	Portugal
Try: Chupin; Krasnobaev; Nikolaychuk; Simonov; Uanbayev (2); Con: Simonov; Yakovlev (2); Pen: Simonov; Yakovlev (2)		Try: Barbosa; Garvão; Grenho; Con: Grenho (3); Pen: Cather; Grenho

Stadium Junost, Krasnodar

8 April 2001

Netherlands	16–36	Spain
Try: Kuipers; Van der Pol; Pen: Meek		Try: Bohorquez Goméz Millan; Kovalenco (2); Ripol; Salazar Lizarraga; Con: Kovalenco (2); Pen: Kovalenco (3)

Nationaal Rugby Centrum, Amsterdam

8 April 2001

Romania	20–31	Georgia
Try: Corodeanu (2); Ghioc; Con: Ciolacu; Drop: Gontineac		Try: Abuseridze; Bolgashvili; Tsabadze; Con: Jimsheladze (2); Pen: Jimsheladze (3); Urjukashvili

Stadionul Dinamo, Bucharest
Attendance: 2,000
Referee: Daniel Dartigeas (France)

== See also ==
- 2001 European Nations Cup Second Division
- 2003 Rugby World Cup – European qualification
