= 2003–04 European Nations Cup First Division =

International rugby union competition

2003–04 European Nations Cup
- Date: 16 February 2003 – 27 March 2004
- Countries: Czech Republic; Georgia; Portugal; Romania; Russia; Spain

Final positions
- Champions: Portugal
- Antim Cup: Romania (2003, 2004)

Tournament statistics
- Matches played: 29
- Tries scored: 128 (4.41 per match)

The 2003–04 European Nations Cup was the fourth edition of the newly reformed European Championship for tier 2 and 3 rugby union nations. This was the second two-year cycled championship, the first to be planned from the start.

The title was won by Portugal for the first time, with their Iberian neighbours Spain being relegated. Portugal won all their games, except to a loss abroad to Romania. The Championship saw another new face in the Czech Republic who replaced the relegated Netherlands.

== Table ==
Place	Nation	Games				Points			Table points
Place	Nation	Played	Won	Drawn	Lost	For	Against	Difference	Table points
1	Portugal	10	9	0	1	245	180	+65	28
2	Romania	10	8	0	2	320	123	+197	26
3	Georgia	10	5	1	4	193	148	+45	21
4	Russia	9	3	0	6	198	175	+23	15
5	Czech Republic	9	3	0	6	139	263	−124	15
6	Spain	10	0	1	9	129	335	−206	11

== Results ==
=== Week 1 ===
16 February 2003

Portugal	34–30	Georgia
Try: Gonçalves; Da. Mateus; Di. Mateus; Con: Malheiro (2); Pen: Malheiro (5)		Try: Abuseridze; Katsadze (2); Zedginidze; Con: Jimsheladze (2); Pen: Jimsheladze; Drop: Jimsheladze

Lisbon University Stadium, Lisbon
Referee: Nigel Owens (Wales)

16 February 2003

Spain	19–52	Russia
Try: Penalty try Con: Cascarra; Pen: Cascarra (3)		Try: Fedchenko; Grachev; Kuzin; A. Sergeev; S. Sergeev; Con: Rachkov (3); Pen: Rachkov (6); Drop: Rachkov

Inca, Mallorca
Referee: Daniel Pruvot (France)

22 June 2003

Czech Republic	5–42	Romania
Try: Stastny		Try: Brezoianu; Ghioc; Popescu; Săuan; Tofan; Con: Dumbravă (4); Pen: Dumbravă (3)

Tatra Smichov Rugby Club, Prague
Attendance: 2,500
Referee: Dave Pearson (England)

- The match between the Czech Republic and Romania, originally scheduled for 15 February, was postponed.

=== Week 2 ===
22 February 2003

Georgia	34–3	Spain
Try: Gundishvili; Shvelidze; Yachvili; Zibzibadze (2); Con: Jimsheladze (3); Pen: Jimsheladze		Pen: Cascarra

Tbilisi
Attendance: 10,000
Referee: G. Doyle (Ireland)

22 February 2003

Portugal	16–15	Romania
Try: Garvão; Con: Malheiro; Pen: Malheiro (2); Drop: Tomé		Try: Manta; Țincu; Con: Tofan; Pen: Tofan

Lisbon University Stadium, Lisbon
Referee: G. Doyle (Ireland)

14 June 2003

Czech Republic	27–13	Russia
Try: Camrda; Pekarek; Rohlik; Con: Kafka (3); Pen: Kafka (2)		Try: Lubkov; Con: Rachkov; Pen: Rachkov (2)

Tatra Smichov Rugby Club, Prague
Attendance: 1,500
Referee: Nereo Dordolo (Italy)

- The match between the Czech Republic and Russia, originally scheduled for 22 February, was postponed.

=== Week 3 ===
8 March 2003

Portugal	43–10	Czech Republic
Try: Malheiro (2); Da. Mateus; Di. Mateus; Vieira; Con: Malheiro; Cardoso Pinto (2); Pen: Malheiro (4)		Try: Zak; Con: Krejci; Pen: Krejci

Lisbon University Stadium, Lisbon
Referee: Sean Mallon (Netherlands)

9 March 2003

Russia	17–23	Georgia
Try: Sergeev; Pen: Rachkov (2); Drop: Rachkov (2)		Try: Jimsheladze; Pen: Jimsheladze (6)

Stadium Junost, Krasnodar
Referee: Giovanni Morandin (Italy)

9 March 2003

Spain	6–31	Romania
Pen: Díez; Drop: Velazco Querol		Try: Petrechei; Socol; Tofan; Con: Tofan (2); Pen: Tofan (4)

Campo Universitário, Madrid
Attendance: 5,000
Referee: Antonio Lombardi (Italy)

=== Week 4 ===
22 March 2003

Czech Republic	15–30	Georgia
Pen: Kafka (4); Drop: Kafka		Try: Khamashuridze; Labadze; Shvelidze; Zedginidze; Zibzibadze; Con: Jimsheladze; Pen: Jimsheladze

Tatra Simchov Rugby Club, Prague
Attendance: 1,400
Referee: Carlo Damasco (Italy)

22 March 2003

Romania	23–12	Russia
Try: Petrache; Vioreanu; Penalty try Con: Tofan; Pen: Tofan (2)		Pen: Rachkov (4)

Dinamo Stadion, Bucharest
Attendance: 5,000
Referee: Daniel Dartigeas (France)

23 March 2003

Portugal	35–16	Spain
Try: Cunha; Sousa; Con: Malheiro (2); Pen: Malheiro (5); Drop: Malheiro (2)		Try: Tuineau Iloa; Con: Cascarra; Pen: Cascarra (2); Drop: Kovalenco

Estádio Municipal, Coimbra
Referee: Jean-Luc Rebollal (France)

=== Week 5 ===
29 March 2003

Russia	14–25	Portugal
Try: Dymchenko; Pen: Akulov		Try: Cunha; Con: Malheiro; Pen: Malheiro (5); Drop: Malheiro

Stadium Junost, Krasnodar
Referee: Mircea Paraschivescu (Romania)

30 March 2003

Georgia	6–19	Romania
Pen: Jimsheladze (2)		Try: Brezoianu; Gontineac; Maftei; Con: Tofan (2)

Boris Paichadze National Stadium, Tbilisi
Attendance: 40,000
Referee: Daniel Gillet (France)

30 March 2003

Spain	38–40	Czech Republic
Try: Beltrán Rodriguéz; Cascarra; Loubsens; Monreal Izquierdo; Zarzosa; Con: Cascarra (2); Pen: Cascarra (3)		Try: Rohlik; Stastny; Suster; Syrovy; Con: Kafka (4); Pen: Kafka (4)

Campo Universitário, Madrid
Referee: Jeremy Schauder (Israel)

=== Week 6 ===
14 February 2004

Romania	55–11	Czech Republic
Try: Baraulea (2); Gheara; Gontineac; Săuan; Teodorescu (2); Zebega; Con: Dumbravă (6); Pen: Dumbravă		Try: Rohlik; Pen: Kafka; Krejci

Dinamo Stadion, Bucharest
Referee: Jean-Luc Rebollal (France)

14 February 2004

Georgia	14–19	Portugal
Try: Ghvaberidze; Kopaliani; Con: Kvnikhidze; Urjukashvili		Try: Aguilar; Con: Malheiro; Pen: Malheiro (3); Drop: Malheiro

Meskhi Stadium, Tbilisi
Attendance: 15,000
Referee: Antonio Lombardo (Italy)

14 February 2004

Russia	36–6	Spain
Try: Fedchenko; Grachev; Korobeynikov; Korshunov; Kuzin; Rachkov; Pen: Rachkov (2)		Pen: Martinéz Torres

Stadium Junost, Krasnodar
Referee: Jean-Pierre Pellaprat (France)

=== Week 7 ===
21 February 2004

Romania	36–6	Portugal
Try: Baraulea; Mersoiu; Săuan (2); Toderașc; Con: Dumbravă (4); Pen: Dumbravă		Pen: Malheiro (2)

Stade 1 Mai, Constanta
Attendance: 1,500
Referee: Johan Meersman (Belgium)

22 February 2004

Spain	6–6	Georgia
Pen: Kovalenco; Martinéz Torres		Pen: Kvinikhidze (2)

Tarragona
Attendance: 5,000
Referee: Mauro Dordolo (Italy)

- The game between Russia and the Czech Republic, originally scheduled for 21 February 2004 and postponed due to snow, was not played.

=== Week 8 ===
6 March 2004

Romania	50–10	Spain
Try: Dragoș Dima; Sîrbu; Socol; Teodorescu; Țincu; Toderașc; Tonița; Voicu; Con: Tofan (5)		Try: Loubsens; Con: Martinéz Torres; Pen: Martinéz Torres

Stadionul Ghencea II, Bucharest
Attendance: 2,000
Referee: Jean-Christophe Gastou (France)

6 March 2004

Georgia	9–3	Russia
Pen: Barkalaia; Jimsheladze; Drop: Jimsheladze		Pen: Rachkov

Meskhi Stadium, Tbilisi
Attendance: 6,000
Referee: Joel Dume (France)

6 March 2004

Czech Republic	8–13	Portugal
Try: Rohlik; Drop: Brabek		Try: Cunha; Garvão; Pen: Grenho

Tatra Smichov Rugby Club, Prague
Attendance: 500
Referee: Séan Mallon (Netherlands)

=== Week 9 ===
20 March 2004

Russia	33–24	Romania
Try: Grachev; Kazantsev; Klyuchnikov; Shelepkov; Con: Simonov (2); Pen: Simonov (3)		Try: Săuan; Toderașc; Penalty try Con: Dumbravă (3); Pen: Dumbravă

Stadium Junost, Krasnodar
Attendance: 1,000
Referee: Gérard Borréani (France)

20 March 2004

Spain	19–35	Portugal
Try: Davila Sánchez; Velazco Querol; Pen: Kovalenco (3)		Try: Aguilar (2); Garvão (3); Mateus; Con: Malheiro; Pen: Malheiro

Ibiza
Attendance: 2,000
Referee: Akim Hadj Bachir (France)

20 March 2004

Georgia	23–7	Czech Republic
Try: Gorgodze; Zedginidze; Con: Kvinikhidze (2); Pen: Kvinikhidze (3)		Try: Rohlik; Con: Krejci

Boris Paichadze National Stadium, Tbilisi
Attendance: 15,000
Referee: Bernd Gabbei (Germany)

=== Week 10 ===
27 March 2004

Czech Republic	16–6	Spain
Try: Brabec; Con: Kafka; Pen: Kafka; Drop: Kafka		Pen: Martinéz Torres (2)

Tatra Smichov Rugby Club, Prague
Referee: Maurizio Vancini (Italy)

27 March 2004

Portugal	19–18	Russia
Try: Andrade; Malheiro; Pen: Malheiro (3); Drop: Kazantsev		Try: Kuzin; Simonov; Con: Simonov; Pen: Simonov

Municipal Stadium, Coimbra

27 March 2004

Romania	25–18	Georgia
Try: Sîrbu; Tudori; Pen: Dumbravă (2); Tofan (3)		Try: Gorgodze; Kvinikhidze; Con: Kvinikhidze; Pen: Kvinikhidze (2)

Iași
Attendance: 8,000
Referee: Stefano Mancini (Italy)

== See also ==
- 2002–04 European Nations Cup Second Division
- 2002–03 European Nations Cup Third Division
- 2003–04 European Nations Cup Third Division
