= 2000 European Nations Cup First Division =

International rugby union competition

2000 European Nations Cup
- Date: 6 February – 2 April 2000
- Countries: Georgia; Morocco; Netherlands; Portugal; Romania; Spain

Tournament statistics
- Champions: Romania
- Matches played: 15

The 2000 European Nations Cup was the first European Nations Cup, an international rugby union competition for second-tier nations. It replaced the FIRA Tournament following the emergence of professionalism in rugby union and Italy being granted a place in the Six Nations.

The first season had six teams (five from Europe and one from Africa). The teams played each other once, playing roughly to the same weekends as the Six Nations. Romania won the first title, with a single loss to Morocco in the opening game. Georgia improved their performance in the context of European rugby, finishing in second place, while Morocco finished in third place, ahead of Spain and Portugal. Netherlands finished last.

== Table ==
Place	Nation	Games				Points			Table points
Place	Nation	Played	Won	Drawn	Lost	For	Against	Diff	Table points
1	Romania	5	4	0	1	130	57	+73	13
2	Georgia	5	3	0	2	145	105	+40	11
3	Morocco	5	3	0	2	94	69	+25	11
4	Spain	5	2	0	3	109	105	+4	9
5	Portugal	5	2	0	3	74	100	−26	9
6	Netherlands	5	1	0	4	52	168	−116	7

== Matches ==
=== Week 1 ===
6 February 2000

Morocco	18–10	Romania

Stade du COC, Casablanca

6 February 2000

Portugal	30–32	Georgia
Pen: Teixeira (9); Drop: Teixeira		Try: Giorgadze, Khekhelashvili, Tsabadze (2); Con: Urjukashvili (3); Pen: Urjukashvili (2)

Lisbon University Stadium, Lisbon
Referee: J. P. Pellaprat (France)

6 February 2000

Spain	33–8	Netherlands
Try: Frechilla, Justel, Salazar Lizarraga, Zapatero; Con: Kovalenco, Martinéz Torres; Pen: Kovalenco (3)		Try: Philpott; Pen: Hannay

Mallorca
Attendance: 4,000
Referee: R. Faccioli (Italy)

=== Week 2 ===
20 February 2000

Georgia	20–10	Morocco
Try: Giorgadze, Katsadze; Con: Urjukashvili (2); Pen: Urjukashvili (2)		Try: Hamdini, Oufrich

St Gaudens, France
Attendance: 500
Referee: Jean-Pierre Matheu (France)

20 February 2000

Romania	39–10	Netherlands
Try: Corodeanu, Drăguceanu, Dumitru (2), Mitu; Con: Mitu (4); Pen: Mitu (2)		Try: Winkels; Con: Van der Loos; Pen: Van der Loos

Amsterdam
Attendance: 2,000

20 February 2000

Portugal	21–19	Spain
Pen: Mourão (4), Teixeira (3)		Try: Mata; Con: Kovalenco; Pen: Kovalenco (4)

Lisbon University Stadium, Lisbon
Referee: D. Gillet (France)

=== Week 3 ===
4 March 2000

Spain	36–32	Georgia
Try: Astarloa Uriarte, del Valle, Frechilla (2), Souto; Con: Martinéz Torres (4); Pen: Martinéz Torres		Try: Abashidze, Labadze, Mtchedlishvili, Tsabadze (2); Con: Iurini, Urjukashvili; Pen: Urjukashvili

Campo Universitário, Madrid
Referee: C. Giacomel (Italy)

4 March 2000

Romania	33–3	Portugal
Try: Mersoiu, Petrache, Sîrbu, Tonița, Vioreanu; Con: Mitu; Pen: Mitu (2)		Pen: Teixeira

Dinamo Stadion, Bucharest
Attendance: 5,000
Referee: D. Dartigeas (France)

4 March 2000

Netherlands	15–44	Morocco

Amsterdam

=== Week 4 ===
19 March 2000

Georgia	41–6	Netherlands
Try: Abuseridze, Giorgadze, Jimsheladze, Kavtaravhili (2), Labadze, Zedgnidize; Con: Iurini, Jimsheladze (2)		Pen: Hannay (2)

National Stadium, Tbilisi
Attendance: 20,000
Referee: S. de Falco (Italy)

19 March 2000

Romania	25–6	Spain
Try: Dumitru, Gontineac, Vioreanu; Con: Mitu (2); Pen: Mitu (2)		Pen: Martinéz Torres (2)

Stadionul Ghencea II, Bucharest
Attendance: 500
Referee: G. Morandin (Italy)

19 March 2000

Portugal	9–3	Morocco

Lisbon University Stadium, Lisbon
Referee: Johan Meersman (Belgium)

=== Week 5 ===
2 April 2000

Georgia	20–23	Romania
Try: Kavtarahvili, Nadiradze; Con: Jimsheladze (2); Pen: Jimsheladze (2)		Try: Brezoianu, Sîrbu; Con: Mitu (2); Pen: Mitu (2)

National Stadium, Tbilisi
Attendance: 35,000
Referee: D. Pruvot (France)

2 April 2000

Spain	15–19	Morocco

Albacete

2 April 2000

Netherlands	13–11	Portugal
Try: Van der Pol; Con: Hannay; Pen: Hannay (2)		Try: Murinello; Pen: Teixeira (2)

Amsterdam
Referee: Jeremy Schauder (Israel)

== See also ==
- European Nations Cup Second Division 2000
- European Nations Cup Third Division 2000
- European Nations Cup Fourth Division 2000
- FIRA – Association of European Rugby
- Six Nations Championship
