= 2001–02 European Nations Cup First Division =

International rugby union competition

2001–02 European Nations Cup
- Date: 4 February 2002 – 7 April 2002
- Countries: Georgia; Netherlands; Portugal; Romania; Russia; Spain

Final positions
- Champions: Romania
- Antim Cup: Romania

Tournament statistics
- Matches played: 30
- Tries scored: 102 (3.4 per match)

The 2001–02 European Nations Cup was the third edition of the newly reformed European championship. It was the first to be decided over two years.

Since the format had changed at the end of 2001, Georgia were allowed to keep their 2001 title. The championship simply carried on from 2001 with the standings starting as they had finished and playing the reverse fixtures in the home and away competition.

Also new to the championship was the introduction of Promotion/relegation between Division 1 and 2A. The Netherlands, after three consecutive bottom-placed finishes, were relegated.

The champions of the first two-year season were Romania, overtaking Georgia's lead from 2001.

== Table ==
Place	Nation	Games				Points			Table points
Place	Nation	Played	Won	Drawn	Lost	For	Against	Difference	Table points
1	Romania	5	5	0	0	185	77	+108	15
2	Georgia	5	3	1	1	184	84	+100	12
3	Russia	5	3	1	1	180	87	+93	12
4	Portugal	5	2	0	3	93	130	−37	9
5	Spain	5	1	0	4	128	119	+9	7
6	Netherlands	5	0	0	5	27	300	−273	5

== Results ==
For the 2000–01 season, see here.

=== Week 1 ===
3 February 2002

Georgia	88–0	Netherlands
Try: Eloshvili; Giorgadze; Modebadze (2); Shvelidze; Tsabadze; Urjukashvili; Zedginidze (2); Zebzibadze; Con: Jimsheladze (9)

Boris Paichadze National Stadium, Tbilisi
Attendance: 10,000
Referee: Tomáš Tuma (Czech Republic)

3 February 2002

Romania	44–17	Portugal
Try: Bălan; Bejan; Brezoianu; Dumitri; Gontineac; Maftei; Petrache; Con: Tofan (3); Pen: Tofan		Try: Garvão; Pen: Hoffmann (4)

Stadionul Dinamo, Bucharest
Attendance: 1,000
Referee: Bernd Gabbei (Germany)

3 February 2002

Russia	35–25	Spain
Try: Grachev (3); Ilarionov; Simonov (2); Con: Simonov; Pen: Simonov		Try: Velazco Querol; Con: Martinéz Torres; Pen: Martinéz Torres (4); Velazco Querol; Drop: Velazco Querol

Stadium Junost, Krasnodar
Attendance: 4,000
Referee: Elio Petri (Italy)

=== Week 2 ===
16 February 2002

Portugal	23–27	Georgia
Try: Aguilar; Gonçalves; Vareiro; Con: Hoffmann; Pen: Hoffmann (2)		Try: Giorgadze (2); Khekhelashvili; Urjukashvili; Con: Jimsheladze (2); Pen: Urjukashvili

Lisbon University Stadium, Lisbon
Referee: Daniel Pruvot (France)

17 February 2002

Russia	73–10	Netherlands
Try: Dyatlov; Grachev; Ilarionov; Rachkov (2); Sergeev (2); Simonov; Zikov; Con: Budnikov (3); Simonov (4); Pen: Budnikov (2); Simonov		Try: Keulemans; Con: Meek; Pen: Meek

Stadium Janost, Krasnodar
Referee: Bernd Gabbei (Germany)

17 February 2002

Romania	34–12	Spain
Try: Bălan; Gontineac; Petrache; Tofan; Tonița; Con: Tofan (3); Pen: Tofan		Try: O. Ripol; R. Ripol; Con: Martinéz Torres

Stadi 1 Mai, Constanta
Attendance: 3,000
Referee: Alessandro Milan (Italy)

=== Week 3 ===
3 March 2002

Netherlands	3–49	Romania
Pen: Kuijer		Try: Brezoianu; Chiriac; Dumitru; Manta; Petrache; Picoiu; Țincu (2); Toderașc; Con: Dumitraș; Lungu

Amsterdam

3 March 2002

Georgia	12–12	Russia
Pen: Jimsheladze (4)		Pen: Rachkov; Simonov (3)

Boris Paichadze National Stadium, Tbilisi
Attendance: 60,000
Referee: Nereo Dordolo (Italy)

3 March 2002

Portugal	13–10	Spain
Try: Aguilar; Cunha; Pen: Hoffmann		Try: De la Calle; Souto

Complexo Desportivo, Caldas da Rainha
Referee: Jean-Christophe Gastou (France)

=== Week 4 ===
24 March 2002

Spain	18–34	Georgia
Try: Criado Garachana (2); Souto; Pen: Díez		Try: Katsadze; Khamashuridze (2); Labadze; Zibzibadze; Con: Jimsheladze (3); Pen: Jimsheladze

Campo Universitário, Madrid
Attendance: 2,000
Referee: Salvatore de Falco (Italy)

24 March 2002

Netherlands	11–27	Portugal
Try: Breinburg; Pen: Kuijer (2)		Try: Aguilar; Hoffmann (2); Portela; Penalty try Con: Hoffmann

Amsterdam
Referee: Johan Meersman (Belgium)

24 March 2002

Russia	22–27	Romania
Try: Kuzin; Simonov; Zikov; Con: Simonov (2); Pen: Simonov		Try: Brezoianu; Tofan; Con: Tofan; Pen: Tofan (5)

Stadium Junost, Krasnodar
Attendance: 3,000

=== Week 5 ===
6 April 2002

Spain	63–3	Netherlands
Try: Abril Aparicio; Macías Gimeno (2); Souto; Trillo Martinéz; Velazco Querol (3); Zapatero; Con: Martinéz Torres (4); Velazco Querol (2); Pen: Martinéz Torres (2)		Pen: Kuijer

Estadio Monte Romero, Murcia
Referee: Johan Meersman (Belgium)

6 April 2002

Georgia	23–31	Romania
Try: Chkhaidze; Urjukashvili; Con: Urjukashvili (2); Pen: Urjukashvili (3)		Try: Brezoianu; Săuan; Țincu; Con: Tofan (2); Pen: Tofan (2); Drop: Tofan (2)

Boris Paichadze National Stadium, Tbilisi
Attendance: 45,000
Referee: Giovanni Morandin (Italy)

7 April 2002

Portugal	13–38	Russia
Try: Cordeiro; Garvão; Pen: Hoffmann		Try: Fedchenko; Hendriks; Rachkov (2); Simonov; Con: Simonov (2); Drop: Simonov (3)

Campo de Santa Rita, Lousã
Referee: Éric Darrière (France)
