= Romania at the 1924 Summer Olympics =

- IOC code: ROU
- NOC: Romanian Olympic Committee

in Paris
- Competitors: 35 in 4 sports
- Medals Ranked 23rd: Gold 0 Silver 0 Bronze 1 Total 1

Summer Olympics appearances (overview)
- 1900; 1904–1920; 1924; 1928; 1932; 1936; 1948; 1952; 1956; 1960; 1964; 1968; 1972; 1976; 1980; 1984; 1988; 1992; 1996; 2000; 2004; 2008; 2012; 2016; 2020; 2024; 2028

Romania competed at the 1924 Summer Olympics in Paris, France. It was the first time that Romania sent a team to compete at the Olympic Games, and the second appearance overall after a lone Romanian athlete competed at the 1900 Summer Olympics. 35 competitors, all men, took part in 7 events in 4 sports.

== Medalists ==
Medal	Name	Sport	Event	Date
Bronze	Romania national rugby union team: Nicolae Anastasiade; Dumitru Armăşel; Gheorghe Benţia; J. Cociociaho; Constantin Cratunescu; Teodor Florian; Petre Ghiţulescu; Ion Gîrleşteanu; Octav Luchide; Jean Henry Manu; Nicolae Mărăscu; Teodor Marian; Sorin Mihăilescu; Paul Nedelcovici; Iosif Nemeş; Eugen Sfetescu; Mircea Sfetescu; Soare Sterian; Mircea Stroescu; Atanasie Tănăsescu; Mihai Vardala; Paul Vidraşcu; Dumitru Volvoreanu	Rugby union		May 18

Medals by sport
Sport	1st place, gold medalist(s)	2nd place, silver medalist(s)	3rd place, bronze medalist(s)	Total
Rugby union	0	0	1	1
Total	0	0	1	1

Medals by gender
Gender	1st place, gold medalist(s)	2nd place, silver medalist(s)	3rd place, bronze medalist(s)	Total
Male	0	0	1	1
Female				
Total	0	0	1	1

== Football ==
Romania competed in the Olympic football tournament for the first time in 1924.

Round 1
Did not compete in first round

Round 2

May 27, 1924
16:00

Netherlands	6–0	Romania
Hurgronje 8'; Pijl 32', 52', 66', 68' de Natris 69' (pen.)	Report

Stade Olympique, Colombes
Attendance: 1,000
Referee: F. Herren (SUI)

Final rank
9th place

== Rugby union ==
Romania sent a rugby team to the Olympics for the first time in 1924. The Romanians were defeated handily by each of the two other teams, finishing third in the three-team round-robin and winning bronze medals.

Ranks given are within the pool.

Team	Event	Round robin				
Team	Event	Wins	Losses	Points for	Points against	Rank
Romania	Men's rugby union	0	2	3	98	3rd place, bronze medalist(s)

May 4

France	61–3	Romania

Stade Olympique
May 11

United States	37–0	Romania

Stade Olympique

== Shooting ==
Five sport shooters represented Romania in 1924.

Shooter	Event	Final	
Shooter	Event	Score	Rank
Vasile Ghițescu	50 m rifle, prone	355	62
Vasile Ghițescu	600 m free rifle	57	68
Constantin Țenescu	50 m rifle, prone	326	65
Constantin Țenescu	600 m free rifle	83	19
Simion Vartolomeu	50 m rifle, prone	369	52
Simion Vartolomeu	600 m free rifle	70	55
Alexandru Vatamanu	50 m rifle, prone	321	66
Alexandru Vatamanu	600 m free rifle	DNF	–
Vasile Ghițescu; Mihai Plătăreanu; Constantin Țenescu; Simion Vartolomeu; Alexandru Vatamanu	Team free rifle	524	13

== Tennis ==
Men

Athlete	Event	Round of 128	Round of 64	Round of 32	Round of 16	Quarterfinals	Semifinals	Final	
Athlete	Event	Opposition Score	Opposition Score	Opposition Score	Opposition Score	Opposition Score	Opposition Score	Opposition Score	Rank
Gheorghe Lupu	Singles	del Canto (MEX); W 6–4, 6–3, 6–4	Washburn (USA); L 2–6, 3–6, 4–6	did not advance					
Nicolae Mişu	Singles	Washer (BEL); L 3–6, 4–6, 2–6	did not advance						
Alexandru Roman	Singles	N/A	von Kehrling (HUN); L 1–6, 1–6, 2–6	did not advance					
Gheorghe Lupu; Alexandru Roman	Doubles	—N/a	Torralva / Torralva (CHI); L 5–7, 2–6, 3–6	did not advance					
