= 1989–90 FIRA Trophy =

European rugby union championship

1989-90 FIRA Trophy
- Date: 22 October 1989 – 27 May 1990
- Countries: France; Italy; Romania; Poland; Soviet Union

Tournament statistics
- Champions: France Soviet Union Romania
- Matches played: 10

The 1989–90 FIRA Trophy was the 28th edition of a European rugby union championship for national teams. The format returned to a one-year tournament, with each team facing each other only once.

The tournament was won by France, Romania and Soviet Union, who all finished with three wins and one loss, and the same points. France only awarded caps in their 12-6 loss at home to Romania. Italy finished in a disappointing 4th place, with a single win, while Poland lost all their four games and was relegated. Their best result was a 25-19 loss to Romania abroad, in a game where the Romanians didn't awarded caps.

Portugal and Spain where the winners of the Second division groups, facing each other's in a final, won by the Spaniards (29-6).

== First division ==
Place	Nation	Games				Points			Table points
Place	Nation	played	won	drawn	lost	for	against	diff.	Table points
1	France	4	3	0	1	82	47	+35	10
1	Soviet Union	4	3	0	1	81	59	+22	10
1	Romania	4	3	0	1	66	55	+11	10
4	Italy	4	1	0	3	67	56	+11	6
5	Poland	4	0	0	4	43	122	-79	4

- Poland Relegated to division 2

Point system: try 4 pt, conversion: 2 pt., penalty kick 3 pt. drop 3 pt
Click "show" for more info about match (scorers, line-up etc)

22 October 1989

Romania	13 - 21	Soviet Union
Try: Dumitras; Pen: Domocos, Toader		Try: Mironov, Parshin; Con: Dzagnidze (2); Pen: Dzagnidze (2); Drop: Dzagnidze

Baia Mare
Attendance: 8,000
Referee: (France) J.-C. Doucet

5 November 1989

Soviet Union	15 - 12	Italy
Try: Molchanov; Con: Dzagnidze; Pen: Dzagnidze (3)		Try: Mascioletti; Con: Troiani; Pen: Troiani (2)

Fili Stadium, Moscow
Referee: (France) Yves Bressy

18 February 1990

France A1	22 - 12	Italy
Try: Maset, Weller; Con: Bianchi; Pen: Bianchi (4)		Pen: Troiani (4)

Stade Municipal, Albi
Referee: (England) A. J. Spreadbury

7 April 1990

Italy	34 - 3	Poland
Try: Cuttitta (2), Pietroscanti, Venturi, Zanon; Con: Troiani (4); Pen: Troiani (2)		Drop: Hodura

Arenaccia, Naples
Referee: (Germany) H. Rohr

14 April 1990

Romania A	25 - 19	Poland

Parcul Copilului, Bucharest

14 April 1990

Italy	9 - 16	Romania
Pen: Troiani (3)		Try: Ion; Pen: Ignat (4)

Stadio di Cocciano, Frascati
Referee: (France) J.-C. Debat

18 May 1990

France XV	32 - 9	Poland

Parc des Sports, Le Creusot

20 May 1990

Soviet Union	14 - 22	France XV

Fili Stadium, Moscow
Attendance: 4,000

24 May 1990

France	6 - 12	Romania
Pen: Lescarboura (2)		Pen: Ignat (3); Drop: Ignat

Stade Jacques-Fouroux, Auch
Attendance: 4,000
Referee: (England) I. Bullerwell

27 May 1990

Poland	12 - 31	Soviet Union

Warsaw

== Second division ==
=== Pool A ===
The first match between Tunisia and Morocco was tied. The two unions, according with FIRA, agreed to considered valid for tournament the match originally valid only for Rugby World Cup 1991 qualification instead the first one.

The match between Belgium and Tunisia, scheduled in Brussels, was not played.

Place	Nation	Games				Points			Table points
Place	Nation	played	won	drawn	lost	for	against	diff.	Table points
1	Portugal	3	3	0	0	52	28	+24	9
2	Morocco	3	1	0	2	42	38	+4	5
3	Tunisia	2	1	0	1	22	24	-2	4
4	Belgium	2	0	0	2	18	44	-26	2

10 February 1990

Tunisia	12 - 12 match non valid	Morocco

Menzel

10 March 1990

Morocco	20 - 6	Belgium

Casablanca

24 March 1990

Portugal	16 - 10	Morocco

Porto

5 May 1990

Tunisia	16 - 12	Morocco

Harare

25 May 1990

Belgium	12 - 24	Portugal

Waterloo

26 May 1990

Portugal	12 - 6	Tunisia

Lisbon

1990

Belgium	match not played	Tunisia

Brussels

=== Pool B ===
Place	Nation	Games				Points			Table points
Place	Nation	played	won	drawn	lost	for	against		Table points
1	Spain	4	3	1	0	70	45	+25	11
2	Netherlands	4	3	0	1	101	51	+50	10
3	West Germany	4	2	0	2	86	50	+36	8
4	Czechoslovakia	4	0	1	3	45	98	-53	5
5	Bulgaria	4	1	0	3	37	95	-58	5

17 September 1989

West Germany	6 - 12	Netherlands

Fritz-Grunebaum-Sportpark, Heidelberg

29 October 1989

Spain	29 - 15	Netherlands

Estadio Nacional Complutense, Madrid

4 March 1990

Netherlands	45 - 10	Bulgaria

Sportpark Berestein, Hilversum

18 March 1990

Spain	19 - 8	West Germany

Estadio Nacional Complutense, Madrid

18 March 1990

Czechoslovakia	6 - 29	Netherlands

Brno

22 April 1990

Bulgaria	12 - 40	West Germany

Sofia

29 April 1990

Czechoslovakia	22 - 22	Spain

Vyškov

5 May 1990

West Germany	32 - 7	Czechoslovakia

Rudolf-Kalweit-Stadion, Hanover

3 June 1990

Bulgaria	15 - 10	Czechoslovakia

Sofia

Bulgaria	0 – 6 withdraw	Spain

=== Final ===
28 October 1990

Spain	29 - 6	Portugal

Seville

== Third division ==
Place	Nation	Games				Points			Table points
Place	Nation	played	won	drawn	lost	for	against	difference	Table points
1	Andorra	2	2	0	0	35	9	+26	6
2	Yugoslavia	2	1	0	1	31	15	+16	4
3	Luxembourg	2	0	0	2	12	54	-42	2

29 April 1990

Andorra	26 - 6	Luxembourg

Andorra-la-Vella

13 May 1990

Luxembourg	6 - 28	Yugoslavia

Luxembourg

20 May 1990

Yugoslavia	3 - 9	Andorra

Split

== Bibliography ==
- (in Italian) Francesco Volpe, Valerio Vecchiarelli (2000), 2000 Italia in Meta, Storia della nazionale italiana di rugby dagli albori al Sei Nazioni, GS Editore (2000) ISBN 88-87374-40-6.
- (in Italian) Francesco Volpe, Paolo Pacitti (Author), Rugby 2000, GTE Gruppo Editorale (1999).
