= Taylor Gontineac =

Romanian rugby union player

- Full name: Taylor Gontineac
- Born: 16 July 2000 (age 26) Aurillac, France
- Height: 1.85 m (6 ft 1 in)
- Weight: 94 kg (14 st 11 lb; 207 lb)
- Notable relative: Romeo Gontineac (father)

Rugby union career
- Position: Centre
Youth career
- 2005–2017: Aurillac
- 2017–2021: ASM Clermont Auvergne
Senior career
Years	Team	Apps	(Points)
2021–2024	Rouen	50	(50)
2024–	AS Béziers Hérault	11	(5)
International career
Years	Team	Apps	(Points)
2019–	Romania	11	(35)
- Correct as of 21 February 2023

Taylor Gontineac (born 16 July 2000) is a French-born Romanian professional rugby union player who currently plays for the French club AS Béziers Hérault. He is the son of Romeo Gontineac, a Romanian rugby legend and former national team captain.

== Club career ==
Gontineac was born in Aurillac, France; his mother is originally from Cape Town, South Africa. He began playing rugby for the local club Aurillac, inspired by his father. His impressive showings earned him a contract with ASM Clermont Auvergne's espoirs team, with the potential to join the Top 14 side in the future.

In 2021 he moved to Rouen, where he became a key member of the senior squad. In 2024 he signed with AS Béziers Hérault in Pro D2.
