= Serge Lairle =

France international rugby union player & coach

Serge Lairle (born Toulouse, 3 December 1956) is a French rugby union former footballer and a current coach. He played as a prop, lock and hooker.

He played for Stade Toulousain, from 1975/76 to 1989/90, when he finished his career. He played also for France XV.

He was the coach of several teams in France. Lairle was nominated head coach of Romania in 2009. He had a disappointing 2011 Rugby World Cup qualification, reaching only the 3rd place and failing the direct qualifying for the first time but still reaching the repechage. He was replaced by Romeo Gontineac in 2010.

Sporting positions
Preceded by (Romania) Marin Mot (caretaker)	Romanian National Rugby Union Coach; 2009 – 2010	Succeeded by (Romania) Romeo Gontineac
