= Gelu Ignat =

Romanian Rugby union player

Gela Ignat
- Full name: Gela Ignat
- Born: 26 August 1963 (age 63)

Rugby union career
- Position: Flyhalf
Senior career
Years	Team	Apps	(Points)
19??-19??	Steaua București	-	(-)
- Correct as of 24 January 2024
International career
Years	Team	Apps	(Points)
1986-1992	Romania	25	(148)
- Correct as of 24 January 2024

Gelu Ignat (born 26 August 1963) is a Romanian former rugby union player. He won 25 caps over a six-year career scoring 148 points (1 try, 15 conversions, 32 penalties, 6 drop goal).

== Career ==
=== Club ===
He played for Steaua București in the Liga Națională de Rugby.

=== International ===
He made his international debut against Portugal on 22 February 1986. He started at flyhalf in Romania's historic wins over Wales and France.

On 10 December 1988, Romania travelled to Cardiff Arms Park for a test match against the 1988 Five Nations Champions, Wales. Ignat lined up at 10 against Wales Captain Jonathan Davies, Ignats' tactical kicking and large boot helping him lead Romania to a famous victory, Ignat scoring 3 penalties and a conversion. A victory that was described Welsh rugby's most humiliating day, driving the likes of Jonathan Davies to switch codes. The final score was 9–15.

On 24 May 1990, Romania defeated France on French soil, for the first time ever. Ignat was labelled a hero of the match, he scored all of Romanias' points. Romania led 9–0 at the break with Ignat scoring 3 penalties, the French side came back within three points until the 73rd minute where Ignat scored a drop goal securing the win for the Eastern European side.

His final appearance came in a 25–6 loss against France in the FIRA Championship D1 on 28 May 1992.

== Honours ==
=== Romania ===
- FIRA Trophy (3rd place): 1985-1987, 1987-1989, 1990-1992
- FIRA Trophy (Joint-champions): 1989-90
