= Marin Moț =

Romania international rugby union player & coach

Marin Moţ (born 9 July 1956) is a Romanian rugby union coach and former hooker.

He won 10 caps for Romania, from 1980 to 1988, scoring 2 tries, 8 points in aggregate. He was not called for the 1987 Rugby World Cup finals.

He coached Steaua București from 2004 until 2014. He won two National Champion titles in 2005/06 and 2006/07. Moţ was hired as coach of Romania in October 2007 and was in charge until May 2008. He returned as caretaker coach in 2009, after the New Zealander Ellis Meachen had been sacked. He also coached Bucharest Wolves.

Sporting positions
Preceded by (France) Daniel Santamans	Romanian National Rugby Union Coach; 2007 – 2008	Succeeded by (New Zealand) Ellis Meachen
Preceded by (New Zealand) Ellis Meachen	Romanian National Rugby Union Coach (caretaker); 2009 – 2009	Succeeded by (France) Serge Lairle
