= Tim Schumacher =

German internet entrepreneur and investor (born 1976)

- Occupations: Entrepreneur, investor
- Known for: Co-founder of Sedo, eyeo and World Fund

Tim Schumacher is a German internet entrepreneur and investor. He co-founded the domain name marketplace Sedo and was chief executive of its listed parent company, Sedo Holding AG, until the end of 2011. He is a co-founder of eyeo GmbH, the Cologne company behind the ad-blocking software Adblock Plus, and of the climate-technology venture capital fund World Fund. His involvement in Adblock Plus made him a recurring target of criticism from German publishers, several of whom sued eyeo over its "acceptable ads" whitelisting model.

== Early life and education ==
Schumacher studied business administration. In December 1999, Der Spiegel described him as a 23-year-old student and one of five people behind buddyPhone, an early internet telephony venture, and reported that he was studying in Sweden at the time alongside Ulrich Priesner, with whom he would later co-found Sedo.

== Career ==
In 2001, Schumacher co-founded Sedo (an acronym for "Search Engine for Domain Offers") together with Marius Würzner, Ulrich Priesner and Ulrich Essmann. As CEO, Schumacher led the company through international expansion, including the opening of a United States office in Cambridge, Massachusetts. Sedo subsequently became part of the German internet group United Internet. Schumacher announced his departure as CEO in December 2011 and stepped down in 2012 to focus on early-stage investing.

On 29 September 2009 Schumacher was appointed chief executive of AdLINK Internet Media AG, a United Internet affiliate listed on the Frankfurt Stock Exchange Prime Standard.

In 2012 Schumacher relocated to Cambridge, Massachusetts to become chief executive of Sedo's United States subsidiary, Sedo.com LLC. In October 2013 United Internet bought the founders' remaining shares.

In 2011 Schumacher co-founded eyeo GmbH, the company behind the browser extension Adblock Plus, serving as chairman. Die Welt examined eyeo's whitelisting arrangement with Google in 2014, naming Schumacher as the investor whom a technology blogger had targeted. Through his investment vehicle TS Ventures he became an active angel investor in the European technology sector. His investments and advisory roles have companies such as YieldKit, Zolar, CarbonCloud, gridX and Pachama.

In 2015 he acquired the German technology blog Basic Thinking for €27,223.

Schumacher invested in the search engine Ecosia around 2013 and became a co-owner and board member. In 2018, as part of Ecosia's conversion to steward-ownership through the Purpose Foundation, he and founder Christian Kroll gave up their stakes.

In 2018 Schumacher co-founded saas.group, a company that acquires and operates small and mid-sized software as a service businesses, and serves as its chief executive.

In 2021 Schumacher co-founded World Fund, a European climate-technology venture capital fund, with Danijel Višević, Daria Saharova and Craig Douglas; the fund was incubated by Ecosia and launched with a target of €350 million. It closed at more than €300 million in March 2024.

As a general partner at the fund, Schumacher has argued that decarbonisation is the successor to digitalisation as the defining commercial opportunity of the period, and that climate technology must be commercially competitive on its own terms — summarising the fund's investment test as backing only "climate technology you could also sell to a climate denier".

== Recognition ==
In 2007 Sedo and its founders received the EY "Entrepreneur des Jahres" award in Germany in the information and communication technology and media category; the company was reported at the time to have revenue of more than €40 million and over 150 employees.

In March 2020 he received the German Startup Award of the Bundesverband Deutsche Startups in the "Best Investor" category.

In 2023 he was named "Best Impact Investor" at the KfW Capital Awards.
