= Iulian Dumitraș =

Romania international rugby union player

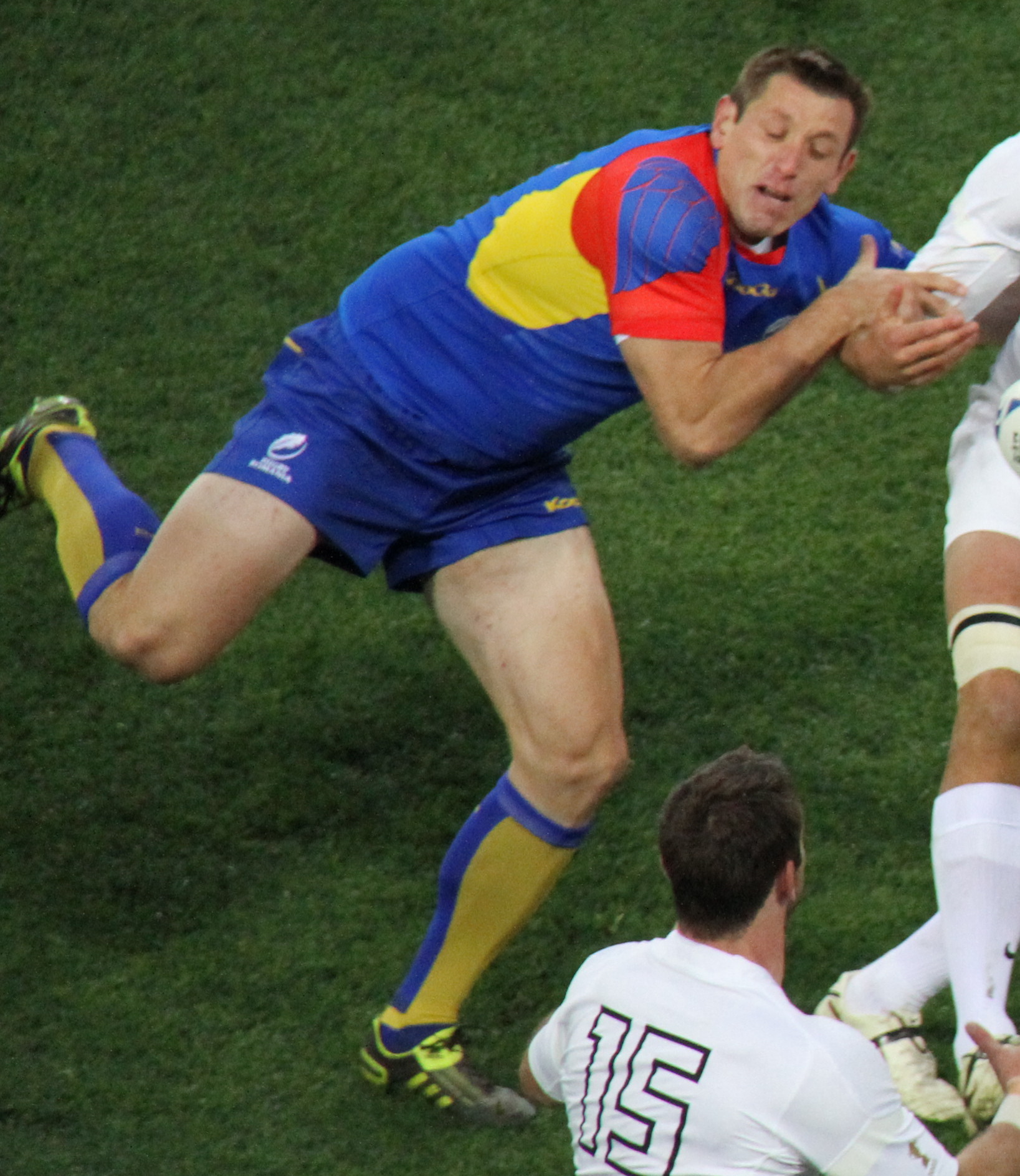
- Dumitraș during the 2011 Rugby World Cup match against England.
- Born: 22 June 1982 (age 44)
- Height: 6 ft 3 in (1.91 m)
- Weight: 231 lb (105 kg; 16.5 st)
- Notable relative: Haralambie Dumitraș (father)

Rugby union career
- Position(s): Fullback; Fly-half
International career
Years	Team	Apps	(Points)
2002–2012	Romania	45	(69)

Iulian Dumitraș (born 22 June 1982 in Suceava) is a Romanian former rugby union fly-half or fullback. He is the son of former Romania international Haralambie Dumitraș.

He played for a number of clubs in France including US Dax, Tarbes, FC Grenoble and Section Paloise.

Dumitraș won 45 caps for Romania, since his debut in 2002, with 11 tries, 4 conversions and 2 penalties scored, 69 points in aggregate. He represented his country at the 2007 Rugby World Cup, playing in all the four games.

He and his father are one of only two father/son pairs of rugby players to have both played for their country in the Rugby World Cup.
