= Diogo Mateus (rugby union) =

Portuguese rugby union player

- Born: 7 February 1980 (age 46) Lisbon, Portugal
- Height: 5 ft 9 in (1.75 m)
- Weight: 205 lb (93 kg)
- Notable relative: David Mateus (twin)

Rugby union career
- Position: centre
Senior career
Years	Team	Apps	(Points)
2006	Munster	1	(0)
International career
Years	Team	Apps	(Points)
2000–2010	Portugal	75	(78)
National sevens team
Years	Team		Comps
2014–2015	Portugal		8

Diogo Pereira Mateus (born Lisbon, 7 February 1980) is a Portuguese rugby union player. He played as a centre.

He came through the ranks at Belenenses (after a stint at "Clube dos TLP"), he was on the books with Heineken Cup champions Munster in the 2006/07 season. He is 1.75 m tall and weighs 93 kg. He has a twin brother David Mateus, who was also a rugby player.

He had 75 caps for Portugal, from 2000 to 2010, scoring 15 tries and 1 penalty, 78 points on aggregate. He was called for the 2007 Rugby World Cup, playing in three games and remaining scoreless.

He was also a notable 7's player, being captain of the Portuguese national Sevens rugby team.
