= Miguel Ángel Frechilla =

- Born: February 1, 1974 (age 52) Valladolid, Spain
- Height: 5 ft 11 in (1.80 m)
- Weight: 183 lb (83 kg)

Rugby union career
- Position: Fullback
Senior career
Years	Team	Apps	(Points)
—	Valladolid RAC		
International career
Years	Team	Apps	(Points)
1998–2003	Spain	20	(15)

Miguel Ángel Frechilla Manrique (born February 1, 1974) is a Spanish rugby union player. He plays as a fullback. He is nicknamed "Mathaus" due to his physical resemblance to the German footballer Lothar Matthäus.

== Career ==
His first international cap was during a match against Portugal, at Murrayfield, on December 2, 1998. He was part of the 1999 Rugby World Cup roster, playing all three matches. His last international cap was against Georgia in Tbilisi on February 22, 2003.
