= Dănuț Dumbravă =

Romania international rugby union player

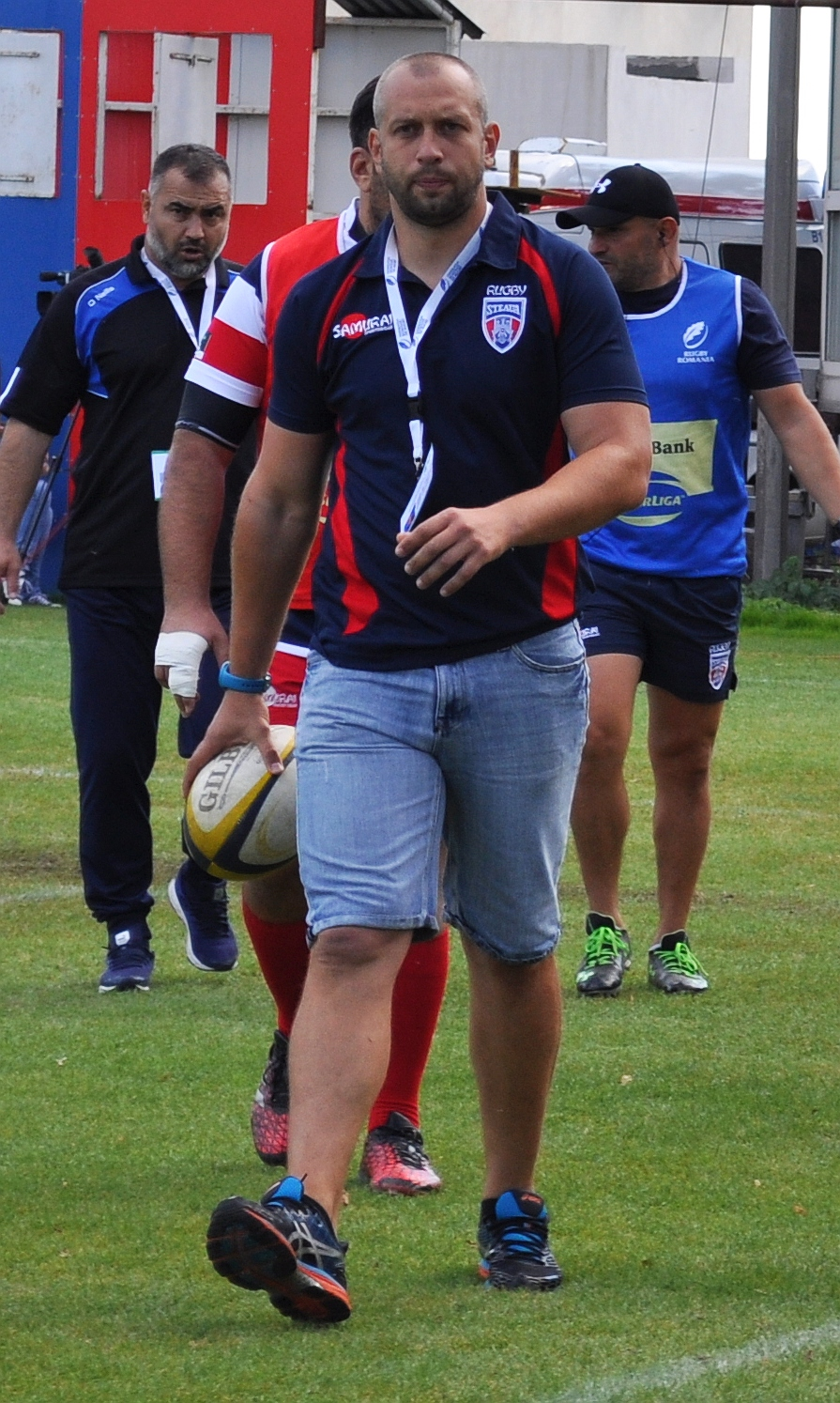
- Dănuț Dumbravă as a head coach for Steaua in 2017
- Born: Dănuț Marin Dumbravă; 6 August 1981 (age 45) Bucharest, Romania
- Height: 1.87 m (6 ft 1 1/2 in)
- Weight: 79.5 kg (12.52 st; 175 lb)

Rugby union career
- Position(s): Fly-half, Fullback
Senior career
Years	Team	Apps	(Points)
1999–15	Steaua		
2004–11	București Wolves	25	(93)
International career
Years	Team	Apps	(Points)
2002–15	Romania	73	(389)
- Correct as of 23 September 2015
Coaching career
- Years: Team
- 2017–: CSA Steaua București

Dănuț Marin "Dan" Dumbravă (born 6 August 1981 in Bucharest) is a former Romanian rugby union footballer and current head coach of CSA Steaua București. He played as a fly-half and a fullback.

== Career ==
Dumbravă played for his entire career with Bucharest side CSA Steaua București in the Romanian Rugby Championship. He also played for București Wolves.

=== International ===
Dumbravă has 73 caps for Romania, with 3 tries, 73 conversions, 74 penalties and 2 drop goals scored, in an aggregate of 389 points. This makes him one of the top scorers for his country. His first match was at 1 November 2002, in a 40–3 loss to Wales, in Wrexham, in a friendly game. Dumbravă played three games at the 2003 Rugby World Cup finals, but was only capped once at the 2007 Rugby World Cup finals. Nevertheless, he scored a conversion in his country's 14–10 win over Portugal. He was called for the 2011 Rugby World Cup, playing in three games and scoring 5 penalties, 15 points on aggregate. He was called once again for the 2015 Rugby World Cup, playing in a single game, as a substitute, without scoring.
