= Romania national rugby union team =

National rugby union team

Romania
- Nickname: Stejarii (The Oaks)
- Emblem: Oak leaf
- Union: Federația Română de Rugby
- Head coach: David Gérard
- Captain: Cristi Boboc
- Most caps: Florin Vlaicu (129)
- Top scorer: Florin Vlaicu (1,030)
- Top try scorer: Cătălin Fercu (33)
- Home stadium: Arcul de Triumf Stadium
First colours	Second colours

World Rugby ranking
- Current: 23 (as of 9 November 2026)
- Highest: 13 (2003, 2004, 2005, 2006)
- Lowest: 23 (2026)

First international
- United States 21–0 Romania (Colombes, France; 26 June 1919); All military sides

Biggest win
- Bulgaria 0–100 Romania (Burgas, Bulgaria; 21 September 1976)

Biggest defeat
- England 134–0 Romania (London, England; 17 November 2001)

World Cup
- Appearances: 9 (first in 1987)
- Best result: Pool stage (1987, 1991, 1995, 1999, 2003, 2007, 2011, 2015, 2023)
Medal record
Men's rugby union
Bronze medal – third place	1924 Paris	Team
- Website: rugbyromania.ro

The Romania national rugby union team, nicknamed Stejarii (The Oaks), has long been considered one of the stronger European teams outside the Six Nations. They have participated in all but one Rugby World Cup and They currently compete in the Rugby Europe Championship and were champions in 2017. Rugby union in Romania is administered by the Romanian Rugby Federation.

France first played Romania in 1924 as part of efforts to expand international rugby beyond the Five Nations Championship. Romania holds the record for the longest unbeaten run by a national team, with 25 consecutive matches without defeat between May 1959 and November 1964. Although not regarded as a first-tier team in more recent times, their history includes an away draw against Ireland, and wins against four (France, Italy, Scotland, Wales) of the other Six Nations Championship teams.

Romania played in every Rugby World Cup through to 2015, but were disqualified from the 2019 tournament after fielding an ineligible player during the qualification process. Romania returned to the 2023 Rugby World Cup and finished bottom of Pool B, losing all of their matches.

== History ==
=== Early history ===
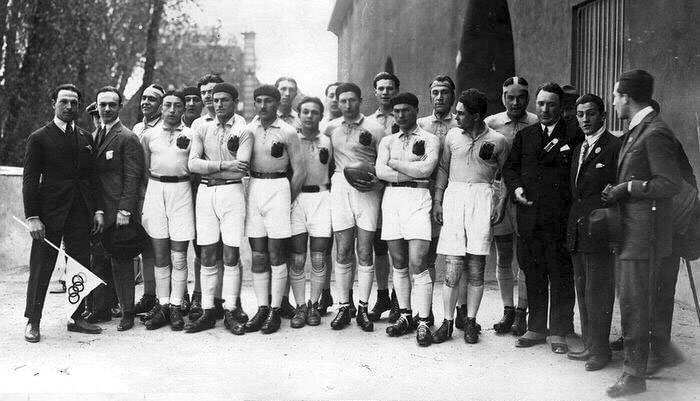
Romania at the 1924 Summer Olympics in Paris, France

The game itself was introduced by students returning with rugby balls from their studies in Paris to form clubs such as Stadiul Roman from 1913 onwards. Seventeen other teams would be formed in the capital, Bucharest.

Romania's first international was played against the US in 1919. France first officially played rugby union against Romania in May 1924 when they tried to establish a rival to the Five Nations Championship (now the Six Nations). France were victorious by 59 points to 3.

Romania were one of three teams who entered the 1924 Olympics in Paris. France won 59–3, scoring 13 tries including four by the fine Stade Francais winger Adolphe Jaureguy. The United States then defeated Romania 39–0. Romania finishing third claimed the bronze medal. The Federaţia Română de Rugby was formed in 1931. In 1939 a team was formed in Braşov at an aircraft factory. This was the first team outside Bucharest.

=== Post-World War II ===
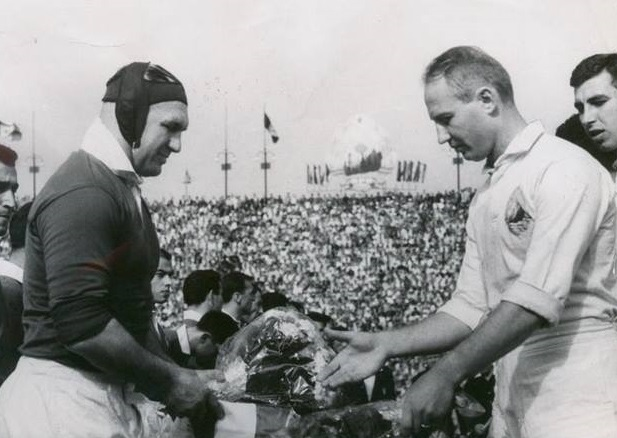
Viorel Morariu (right) captained Romania in the 1950s and early 1960s

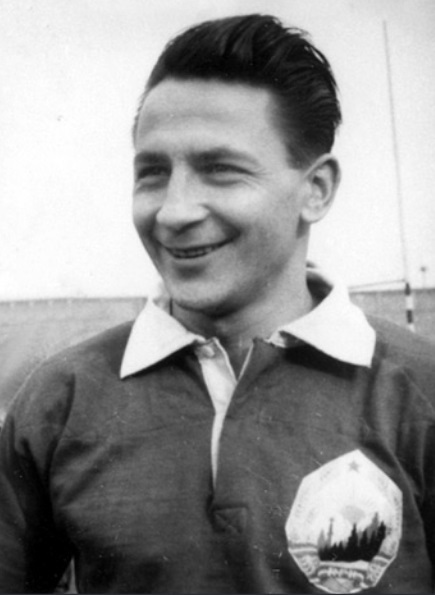
Alex Penciu, one of Romania's greatest players in the 1960s.

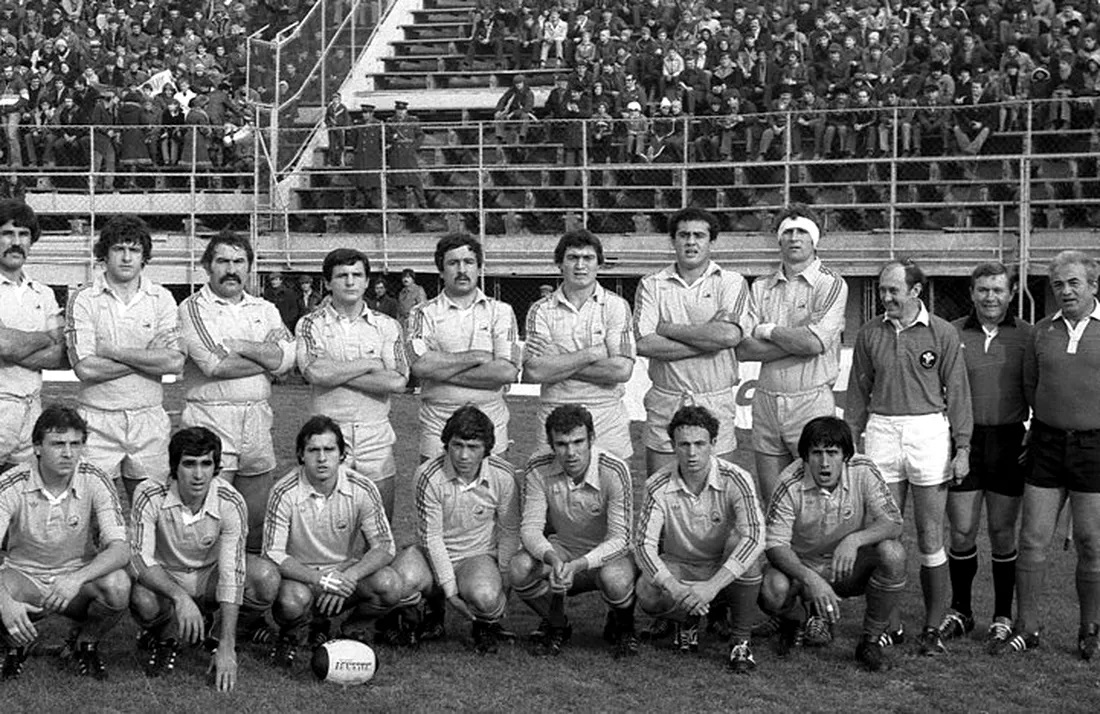
The Oaks starting lineup that beat France 15–0 in November 1980.

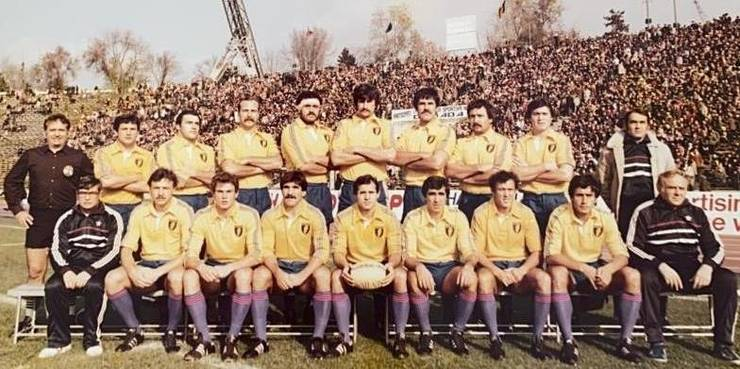
The Oaks before a test match against Wales in 1983.

A generation of French school trained coaches from late 1940s, and 1950s built a system and led the national team to success of the 1960s, 1970s and early 1980s. In this era Romania began to compete more regularly against the major nations. Their first win over France came in 1960 in Bucharest, in a tour match won by 11–5. In 1974 Romania won against France 15–10 in Bucharest, and the FIRA – Association of European Rugby championship. In 1975 Romania went for an 8-game tour to New Zealand, concluding in Wellington with a 10–10 draw against the Junior All Blacks. Exposure to international rugby developed the country's game and they began to form their own distinctive style of play, built around strong, bruising packs. That Romania was emerging as a real force on the world stage became clear on their 1979 Romania rugby union tour of Wales at Cardiff Arms Park, in an unofficial, non-cap international. The Oaks led going into the dying minutes, when only a last-gasp drop goal from Gareth Davies gave a narrow 13–12 victory for Wales. The improvement continued in 1980, when Romania crushed the French in a record 15–0 win in Bucharest. A trip to Lansdowne Road in the 1980 Romania rugby union tour of Ireland then yielded a 13–13 draw against Ireland in another unofficial, non-cap match.

In the 1980s the country boasted more than 12,000 players in 110 clubs. Home nations sides began to award international caps for matches against Romania in 1981; Scotland were the first to do so when Romania visited them on their 1981 tour, Scotland winning the international by 12 points to 6. Wales travelled to Bucharest in November 1983 and were totally overwhelmed, falling to a 24–6 defeat. Romania's first win over Scotland came in Bucharest in 1984 and their first away win against Five Nations opposition came in 1988 against Wales; 15–9 at Cardiff Arms Park.

Their national side beat Wales (twice – 1983: 24–6 in Romania, 1988: 15–9 in Wales), Scotland (the 1984 Grand Slam side 28–22 in Romania), France (twice 1980: 15–0 in Romania, 1982: 13–9 in Romania) and drew with Ireland (13–13, in 1980, at Dublin). In 1981, they lost to the All Blacks 14–6 but had two tries disallowed. Many felt it was wrong for the rugby union powers to fail to bring them into top-flight competition. Romania beat Zimbabwe 21–20 in their first ever Rugby World Cup match in 1987 but did not win any other games and failed to progress beyond the group stage.

=== After the collapse of Communism ===
However, with the deterioration of the domestic political and economic situation in the country in the 1990s, Romanian rugby union suffered; the two leading rugby union teams – Dinamo Bucharest and Steaua Bucharest, represented the police and the army respectively, so their state funding fell.

Post-revolution, Romanian rugby union was still alive and kicking. In 1990 they recorded a prestigious win to date by beating France 12–6 on French soil for the first time. The following year they beat Scotland 18–12. At the 1991 World Cup they beat Fiji 17–15 and as recently as the 1995 World Cup, Romania held the eventual winners South Africa to a highly respectable 21–8.

The professionalism that followed immediately upon the heels of that World Cup was the undoing of the sport in Romania. Approximately 200 Romanian players are thought to be playing in France and Italy. It was not just playing numbers that suffered, but a whole generation of potential referees and administrators was lost to the game. By 1994 Romania's rugby fortunes had declined sharply, when a Welsh team travelled to Bucharest for an uncapped international the visitors came away with a 16–9 win. In 1997 the Romanians toured Wales. They lost 36–21 to Wales A at Pontypridd and 70–21 in a test held in Wrexham. At the 1999 World Cup Romania could again only manage a single win 27–25 against the United States.

=== The new millennium ===
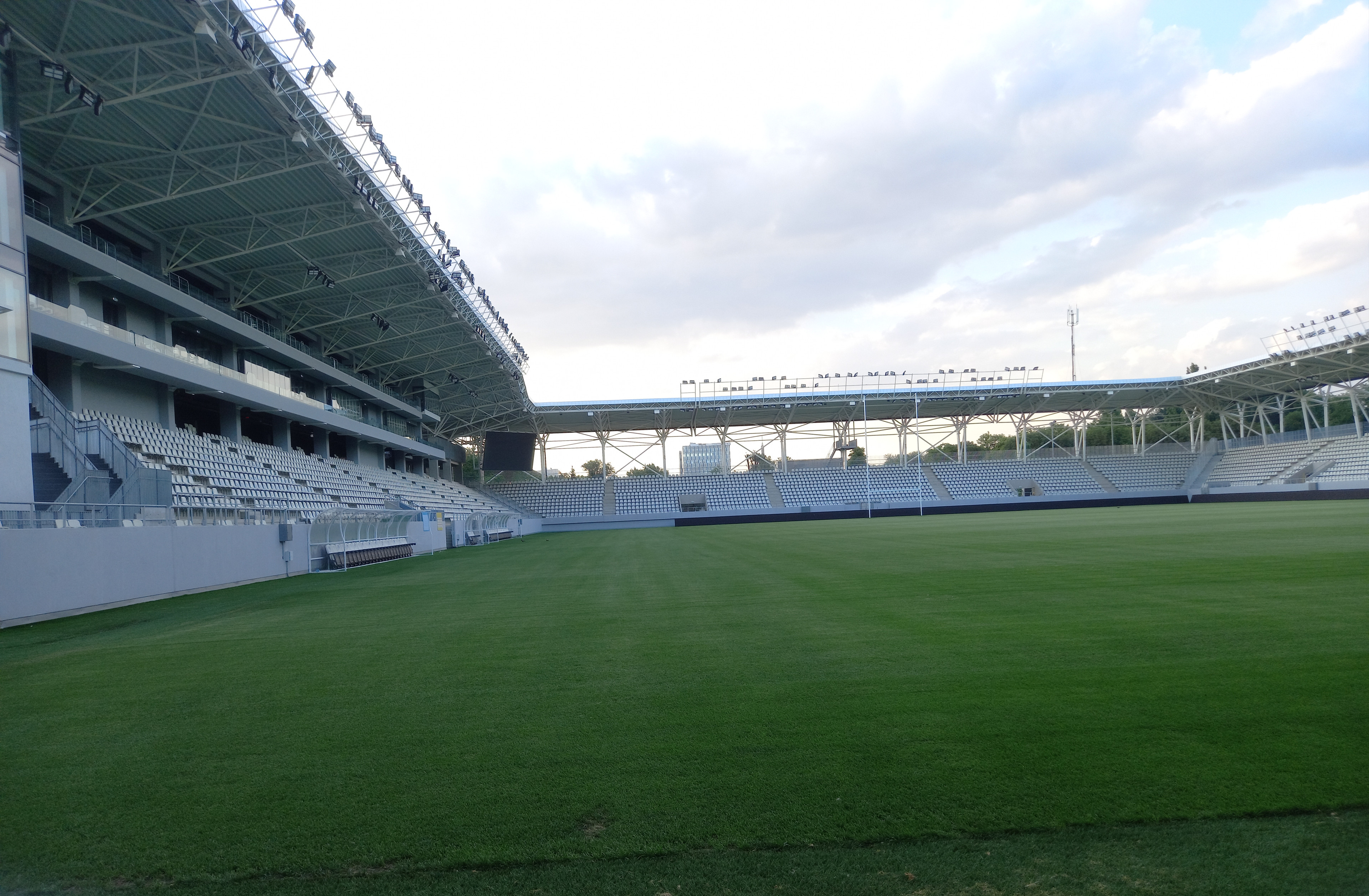
Romania plays its home games at the Stadionul Arcul de Triumf in Bucharest.

Romania playing Ireland at Lansdowne Road in 2005.

In 2000, Romania won the first European Nations Cup by a large margin, recording victories in all four matches. By 2001, Romania had been caught by the likes of Georgia who defeated them to take the 2001 European Nations Cup, crowned with a decisive 31–20 win over Romania in Bucharest. The national side lost to England by 134–0 in 2001 and Dinamo Bucharest lost 151–0 to Saracens in the European Rugby Shield. Several French-based players refused to turn up for the England debacle simply because their clubs refused to pay them for the week. Players in that Romanian squad were getting £30 a day in expenses while England's top earners scooped £6,000 for their afternoon's work.

In January 2002, Bernard Charreyre was appointed coach of the national team both supplied by and paid by the French Rugby Federation (FFR). Under Charreyre (known by The Oaks as 'Little Napoleon'), the Oaks' decline has been stopped and the team has started to slowly climb from the basement of international rugby union. With a change of format in the European Nations Cup, Romania started in 2002 trailing Georgia due to the inclusion of 2001 results. The Oaks won all of the remaining five games, including a hard-fought 31–23 victory in Tbilisi to win the tournament. They qualified for the World Cup in 2003, where they beat Namibia and lost to Ireland (45–17), after an honourable display, and then to Australia (90–8) and Argentina (50–3). Charreyre was dismissed after the World Cup as the Romanian Federation was not satisfied by the World Cup performance and decided not to renew his contract. Three other French coaches followed: first, Phillipe Sauton, for a very short period, Robert Antonin as a temporary stand-in and then Daniel Santamans.

In the 2003–2004 European Nations Cup, Portugal were surprise 16–15 winners over Romania in Lisbon and installed themselves on the top of the 2003 table. In the second half of the competition, Romania seemed back on track (36–6 against Portugal in Constanţa), but went down 24–33 to Russia in Krasnodar following allegations of players having been doped. Then Portugal clinched their first title with a last-minute 19–18 win over Russia in Lisbon. In 2004, the Romanians scored a narrow 25–24 victory over Italy, their first victory to date over a Six Nations Championship side.

In 2005 Romania was given 'second tier' status by the IRB and replaced Russia in the Super Powers Cup. The USA beat a Romanian team stripped of their France-based players 23–16 in the third place play-off. The 2005–06 European Nations Cup also served as a qualifying group for the 2007 Rugby World Cup. Romania triumphed despite finishing level on points with Georgia.

Romania qualified for the 2007 Rugby World Cup in France, finishing at the top of their pool during the Round 5 of the European qualifying tournaments. Romania won their first qualifying match on 7 October, defeating Georgia in Bucharest 20–8. Their 43–20 win over Spain in Madrid on 14 October ensured that they qualified directly for the World Cup in 2007. In June 2007, Romania hosted the IRB Nations Cup in Bucuresti. In the 2007 Rugby World Cup finals, Romania won a bonus point in the 18–24 loss to Italy and to win a second game with Portugal by a narrow margin (14–10), but suffered heavy losses to Scotland (42–0) and New Zealand (85–8).

On 21 March 2009, Romania lost 22–21 at home to Portugal, leaving them with an uphill struggle to qualify for the 2011 World Cup – qualification for which is determined by performances in the European Nations Cup in 2009 and 2010. Romania went unbeaten, with a draw at Russia, in the 2010 phase of the European Nations Cup. The Oaks' strong finish put them in third place and the final phase of the European qualification playoffs, in which they easily defeated Ukraine over two legs (94–10 on aggregate) for the European place in the Final Place Playoff for the 2011 Rugby World Cup. Romania emerged as the last qualifier for the 2011 Rugby World Cup in New Zealand by overcoming first Tunisia in a winner-takes-it-all game (56–13) and later Uruguay (60–33 on aggregate). Thus, the Oaks are one of only 12 teams to participate at all World Cups alongside New Zealand, Australia, England, France, Wales, Ireland, Scotland, Italy, Argentina, Canada, and Japan.

In November 2016, Romania achieved home soil wins against the US, Canada and Uruguay.

In 2018, Romania finished top of the Rugby Europe Championship, meaning they qualified for the 2019 Rugby World Cup to be played in Japan in 2019. But after the conclusion of the tournament World Rugby conducted a review of player eligibility and found Romania fielded Sione Faka'osilea, who previously played for the Tonga Sevens team, which made him ineligible to play for Romania in the competition. Romania was stripped of 30 competition points, which placed them third and meant that they failed to qualify for the 2019 Rugby World Cup, with Russia taking their place.

On 29 May 2018, it was confirmed that Romania had appealed the decision. On 6 June, the appeal failed and the decision was upheld, meaning Russia was confirmed as Europe 1 and qualified for the World Cup, whilst Germany advanced to round 6.

== Honours ==
- Rugby union at the Summer Olympics
  - Bronze Medal (1): 1924
- Rugby Europe International Championships
  - Winner (10): 1968–1969, 1974–1975, 1976–1977, 1980–1981, 1982–1983, 2000, 2001–2002, 2004–2006, 2010, 2017
  - Runners-Up (14)
  - Third-Place (12)
- Antim Cup
  - Winner (6): 2002, 2003, 2004, 2006, 2010, 2017
- World Rugby Nations Cup
  - Winner (4): 2012, 2013, 2015, 2016

== Record ==
Romania holds the record for the longest unbeaten run: 25 matches in between May 1959 and November 1964.

=== Wins against Tier 1 nations ===
Date	Home	Score	Away	Venue	Status
14 April 1940	Romania	3–0	Italy	(Kingdom of Romania) Dinamo Stadium, Bucharest	Test Match
5 June 1960	Romania	11–5	France	(Socialist Republic of Romania) Dinamo Stadium, Bucharest	Test Match
10 June 1962	Romania	14–6	Italy	(Socialist Republic of Romania) Dinamo Stadium, Bucharest	Test Match
11 November 1962	Romania	3–0	France	(Socialist Republic of Romania) Dinamo Stadium, Bucharest	Test Match
14 May 1967	Romania	15–14	Italy	(Socialist Republic of Romania) Dinamo Stadium, Bucharest	1966–67 FIRA Nations Cup
1 December 1968	Romania	24–3	France	(Socialist Republic of Romania) Dinamo Stadium, Bucharest	1968–69 FIRA Nations Cup
25 October 1970	Italy	3–14	Romania	(Italy) Stadio Comunale Mario Battaglini, Rovigo	1969–70 FIRA Nations Cup
11 April 1971	Romania	32–6	Italy	(Socialist Republic of Romania) Dinamo Stadium, Bucharest	1970–71 FIRA Nations Cup
13 October 1974	Romania	15–10	France	(Socialist Republic of Romania) Dinamo Stadium, Bucharest	1974–75 FIRA Trophy
14 November 1976	Romania	15–12	France	(Socialist Republic of Romania) Dinamo Stadium, Bucharest	1976–77 FIRA Trophy
1 May 1977	Romania	69–0	Italy	(Socialist Republic of Romania) Dinamo Stadium, Bucharest	1976–77 FIRA Trophy
22 April 1979	Romania	44–0	Italy	(Socialist Republic of Romania) Dinamo Stadium, Bucharest	1978–79 FIRA Trophy
23 November 1980	Romania	15–0	France	(Socialist Republic of Romania) Dinamo Stadium, Bucharest	1980–81 FIRA Trophy
12 April 1981	Romania	35–9	Italy	(Socialist Republic of Romania) Brăila	1980–81 FIRA Trophy
31 October 1982	Romania	13–9	France	(Socialist Republic of Romania) Dinamo Stadium, Bucharest	1982–83 FIRA Trophy
10 April 1983	Romania	13–6	Italy	(Socialist Republic of Romania) Buzău	1982–83 FIRA Trophy
12 November 1983	Romania	24–6	Wales	(Socialist Republic of Romania) Dinamo Stadium, Bucharest	Test Match
20 May 1984	Romania	28-22	Scotland	(Socialist Republic of Romania) Dinamo Stadium, Bucharest	Test Match
14 April 1985	Romania	7–6	Italy	(Socialist Republic of Romania) Brașov	1984–85 FIRA Trophy
12 April 1987	Romania	9–3	Italy	(Socialist Republic of Romania) Constanța	1985–87 FIRA Trophy
2 April 1988	Italy	3–12	Romania	(Italy) San Siro, Milan	1987–89 FIRA Trophy
10 December 1988	Wales	9–15	Romania	(Wales) Cardiff Arms Park, Cardiff	Test Match
15 April 1989	Romania	28–4	Italy	(Socialist Republic of Romania) Dinamo Stadium, Bucharest	1987–89 FIRA Trophy
14 April 1990	Italy	9–16	Romania	(Italy) Frascati	1989–90 FIRA Trophy
24 May 1990	France	6–12	Romania	(France) Stade du Moulias, Auch	1989–90 FIRA Trophy
31 August 1991	Romania	18–12	Scotland	(Romania) Dinamo Stadium, Bucharest	Test Match
14 May 1994	Romania	26–12	Italy	(Romania) Dinamo Stadium, Bucharest	1992–94 FIRA Trophy
26 June 2004	Romania	25–24	Italy	(Romania) Dinamo Stadium, Bucharest	Test Match

=== European competitions ===
Romania's only annual tournament is a competition involving Europe's tier 2 and tier 3 national teams. From 1936 through 1938, they competed in the FIRA Tournament against France, Germany and Italy. In 1965 until 1973 the FIRA Nations Cup was formed allowing other teams to be promoted or relegated from the competition. Romania won the competition once in 1969, being the only team to defeat France.

Pre–WWII Tournament (1936–1938)
Nation	Games				Points			Table points	Champs
Nation	played	won	drawn	lost	for	against	diff	Table points	Champs
France	6	6	0	0	133	48	+85	–	3
Germany	6	3	0	3	83	92	−9	–	0
Italy	5	3	0	2	75	76	−1	–	0
Romania	7	1	0	6	81	114	−33	–	0
Belgium	2	1	0	1	20	48	−28	–	0
Netherlands	2	0	0	2	8	62	−54	–	0

FIRA Nations Cup (1965–1973)
Nation	Games				Points			Table points	Champs
Nation	played	won	drawn	lost	for	against	diff	Table points	Champs
France	26	25	0	1	824	198	+626	65	7
Romania	26	17	1	8	528	222	+306	51	1
Czechoslovakia	17	2	2	13	135	411	−267	16	0
Morocco	9	2	0	7	65	332	−267	13	0
Italy	13	4	1	8	86	227	−141	12	0
West Germany	10	1	1	8	81	132	−51	6	0
Spain	3	1	0	2	56	55	+1	5	0
Poland	3	0	0	3	19	132	−113	3	0
Portugal	3	0	0	3	23	108	−85	0	0

=== European Nations Cup (2000–present) ===
==== Winners ====
Year	First Division				Lower Division Champions	
Year	Winner	Second	Third	Relegated	Division 2	Division 3
2000	Romania	Georgia	Morocco		Russia	Czech Republic
2001	Georgia	Romania	Russia		Poland	Not played
2001–2002	Romania	Georgia	Russia	Netherlands	Czech Republic	Slovenia
2003–2004	Portugal	Romania	Georgia	Spain	Ukraine	Moldova
2004–2006	Romania	Georgia	Portugal	Ukraine	Spain	Latvia
2006–2008	Georgia	Russia	Romania	Czech Republic	Germany	Sweden
2008–2010	Georgia	Russia	Portugal	Germany	Ukraine	Lithuania
2010	Romania	Georgia	Russia	Germany	Ukraine	Lithuania
2011	Georgia	Romania	Portugal	Ukraine	Belgium	Sweden
2012	Georgia	Spain	Romania	Ukraine	Belgium	Sweden
2013	Georgia	Romania	Russia	Belgium	Germany	Netherlands
2014	Georgia	Romania	Russia	Belgium	Germany	Netherlands
2015	Georgia	Romania	Spain	Portugal	Belgium	Estonia
2016	Georgia	Romania	Russia	Portugal	Belgium	Estonia
2017	Romania	Georgia	Spain	–	Portugal	Czech Republic / Malta
2018	Georgia	Russia	Germany	–	Portugal	Czech Republic / Malta
2019	Georgia	Spain	Romania	Germany	Portugal	
2020	Georgia	Spain	Romania	Belgium	Netherlands	
2021	Georgia	Romania	Portugal	–		
2022	Georgia	Romania	Spain	Russia	Belgium	Sweden / Croatia
2023	Georgia	Portugal	Romania	–		
2024	Georgia	Portugal	Spain	Poland		

=== All-time table ===
	Pld	W	D	L	PF	PA	PD	AVPPG	Pts	Champs
Georgia	100	83	4	13	3096	1151	+1945	30.96	334	11
Romania	100	72	2	26	3024	1311	+1713	30.24	288	5
Russia	85	47	3	34	2190	1788	+402	26.07	186	0
Portugal	85	35	3	47	1605	1865	−260	18.88	152	1
Spain	80	25	4	51	1575	2020	−445	19.69	145	0
Czech Republic	29	6	0	23	362	1075	−713	12.48	40	0
Germany	25	3	1	21	341	1064	−723	13.64	26	0
Netherlands	15	1	0	14	278	652	−374	18.53	17	0
Ukraine	20	1	0	19	201	998	−797	10.05	15	0
Morocco	5	3	0	2	94	69	+25	18.80	11	0
Belgium	20	2	1	17	204	412	−208	13.6	8	0

=== Rivalries ===
Romania and Georgia have enjoyed a rivalry between the two most successful teams in the European Nations Cup. The winner of the rivalry takes home the Antim Cup.

=== Rugby World Cup ===
Romania had competed in every Rugby World Cup since the inaugural tournament in 1987; that streak ended in 2018, when they were expelled from the 2019 tournament via points deduction for fielding ineligible players. Their best finish was with one win in 1987, 1991, 1999, 2003, 2007 and 2015. They lost all pool matches in 1995, 2011 and 2023.

Rugby World Cup record									Qualification						
Year	Round	Pld	W	D	L	PF	PA	Squad	Pos	Pld	W	D	L	PF	PA
(New Zealand) (Australia) 1987	Pool stage	3	1	0	2	61	130	Squad	Invited						
(England) (France) (Ireland) (Scotland) (Wales) 1991	Pool stage	3	1	0	2	31	64	Squad	2nd	3	2	0	1	85	42
(South Africa) 1995	Pool stage	3	0	0	3	14	97	Squad	3rd	4	2	0	2	105	45
(Wales) 1999	Pool stage	3	1	0	2	50	126	Squad	2nd	6	4	0	2	300	127
(Australia) 2003	Pool stage	4	1	0	3	65	192	Squad	2nd	2	1	0	1	84	31
(France) 2007	Pool stage	4	1	0	3	40	161	Squad	1st	12	10	0	2	452	122
(New Zealand) 2011	Pool stage	4	0	0	4	44	169	Squad	P/O	15	10	2	3	492	192
(England) 2015	Pool stage	4	1	0	3	60	129	Squad	2nd	10	8	1	1	242	106
(Japan) 2019	Expelled from competing at tournament after qualification								3rd	8	6	0	2	296	126
(France) 2023	Pool stage	4	0	0	4	32	287	Squad	2nd	10	6	0	4	289	232
(Australia) 2027	Qualified								2nd	3	2	0	1	85	58
(United States) 2031	To be determined								To be determined						
Total	—	32	6	0	26	397	1355	—	—	73	52	3	18	2430	1081
Champions; Runners–up; Third place; Fourth place; Home venue

World Cup results
Year	Stage	Opponent	Final score	Venue
1987	Pool D	Zimbabwe	21–20	Eden Park
1987	Pool D	France	12–55	Lancaster Park
1987	Pool D	Scotland	28–55	Carisbrook
1991	Pool D	France	3–30	Stade de la Méditerranée
1991	Pool D	Canada	11–19	Stade Ernest-Wallon
1991	Pool D	Fiji	17–15	Parc Municipal des Sports
1995	Pool A	Canada	3–34	Boet Erasmus Stadium
1995	Pool A	South Africa	8–21	Newlands
1995	Pool A	Australia	3–42	Danie Craven Stadium
1999	Pool D	Australia	9–57	Ravenhill
1999	Pool D	United States	27–25	Lansdowne Road
1999	Pool D	Ireland	14–44	Lansdowne Road
2003	Pool A	Ireland	17–45	Central Coast Stadium
2003	Pool A	Australia	8–90	Suncorp Stadium
2003	Pool A	Argentina	3–50	Sydney Football Stadium
2003	Pool A	Namibia	37–7	York Park
2007	Pool C	Italy	18–24	Stade Vélodrome
2007	Pool C	Scotland	0–42	Murrayfield Stadium
2007	Pool C	Portugal	14–10	Stadium de Toulouse
2007	Pool C	New Zealand	8–85	Stadium de Toulouse
2011	Pool B	Scotland	24–34	Rugby Park Stadium
2011	Pool B	Argentina	8–43	Rugby Park Stadium
2011	Pool B	England	3–67	Otago Stadium
2011	Pool B	Georgia	9–25	Arena Manawatu
2015	Pool D	France	11–38	Olympic Stadium
2015	Pool D	Ireland	10–44	Wembley Stadium
2015	Pool D	Canada	17–15	Leicester City Stadium
2015	Pool D	Italy	22–32	Sandy Park
2023	Pool B	Ireland	8-82	Nouveau Stade de Bordeaux
2023	Pool B	South Africa	0-76	Nouveau Stade de Bordeaux
2023	Pool B	Scotland	0-84	Stade Pierre-Mauroy
2023	Pool B	Tonga	24-45	Stade Pierre-Mauroy

=== Overall ===
Men's World Rugby Rankings Top 30 as of 16 November 2026
Rank	Change (Note: Change from the previous week)	Team	Points
1	Steady	South Africa	91.53
2	Steady	New Zealand	90.65
3	▲1	France	89.05
4	▼1	Ireland	88.70
5	Steady	England	86.99
6	Steady	Scotland	85.28
7	Steady	Australia	82.24
8	Steady	Argentina	82.09
9	▲1	Wales	79.37
10	▼1	Fiji	77.79
11	Steady	Italy	75.84
12	Steady	Japan	75.25
13	Steady	Georgia	74.23
14	▲1	United States	68.39
15	▼1	Portugal	68.24
16	▲3	Samoa	67.60
17	▲1	Chile	67.00
18	▼2	Spain	66.53
19	▼2	Tonga	65.58
20	Steady	Uruguay	65.17
21	Steady	Canada	63.38
22	Steady	Belgium	62.00
23	Steady	Romania	61.13
24	Steady	Hong Kong	58.46
25	Steady	Zimbabwe	57.71
26	Steady	Netherlands	56.44
27	Steady	Namibia	56.03
28	Steady	Switzerland	55.47
29	Steady	Czech Republic	55.42
30	Steady	Poland	54.54

Romania's historical rankings

Source: World Rugby
Graph updated to 16 November 2026

Below is a table of the representative rugby matches played by a Romania national XV at test level up until 20 November 2026, updated after match with Canada.

Opponent	Played	Won	Lost	Drawn	Win %	For	Aga	Diff
Argentina	9	0	9	0	0.00%	114	341	−227
Argentina XV	6	4	2	0	66.67%	127	126	+1
Australia	3	0	3	0	0.00%	20	189	−169
Belgium	11	11	0	0	100%	501	124	+377
Brazil	2	2	0	0	100%	78	26	+52
Bulgaria	2	2	0	0	100%	170	3	+167
Canada	12	8	4	0	72.73%	252	252	0
Chile	4	2	2	0	50%	104	122	-18
Czech Republic	6	6	0	0	100%	307	53	+254
Czechoslovakia	18	17	0	1	94.44%	349	105	+244
East Germany	13	12	0	1	92.31%	393	69	+324
England	5	0	5	0	0.0%	24	335	−311
Fiji	3	1	2	0	33.33%	42	70	−28
France	50	8	40	2	16%	462	1,315	−853
France A	1	0	1	0	0.00%	16	20	−4
France XV	5	0	5	0	0.00%	30	153	−123
Georgia	31	9	21	1	29.03%	487	756	−269
Germany	14	8	6	0	57.14%	487	208	+279
Ireland	10	0	10	0	0.00%	110	472	−362
Ireland XV	1	0	0	1	0.90%	13	13	+0
Emerging Ireland	1	0	1	0	0.00%	10	31	−21
Italy	44	16	25	3	36.36%	654	711	−57
Italy A	4	2	2	0	50%	65	87	−22
Emerging Italy	2	2	0	0	100%	43	26	+17
Japan	6	1	5	0	16.67%	119	152	−33
Japan XV	1	1	0	0	100%	30	25	+5
Morocco	8	7	1	0	87.5%	342	56	+286
Namibia	6	5	1	0	83.33%	158	66	+92
Netherlands	9	9	0	0	100%	390	73	+317
New Zealand	2	0	2	0	0.00%	14	99	−85
New Zealand XV	1	0	1	0	0.00%	30	60	−30
Junior All Blacks	1	0	0	1	0.00%	10	10	+0
Poland	18	16	2	0	88.89%	601	178	+423
Portugal	32	24	8	0	78.13%	912	481	+431
Russia	24	16	7	1	66.67%	580	347	+233
Samoa	4	3	1	0	66.67%	87	96	−9
Scotland	14	2	12	0	15.38%	192	559	−367
Scotland A	1	0	1	0	0.00%	18	21	−3
South Africa	2	0	2	0	0.00%	8	97	−89
(South Africa) Emerging Springboks	2	0	2	0	0.00%	20	86	−66
Soviet Union	15	12	3	0	80%	251	153	+98
Spain	41	35	6	0	85.37%	1,171	511	+660
Tonga	7	3	4	0	42.86%	174	187	−13
Tunisia	5	4	1	0	80%	189	42	+147
Ukraine	7	7	0	0	100%	400	43	+357
United States	13	3	10	0	23.08%	185	360	−175
Uruguay	17	10	5	2	58.82%	440	348	+92
Wales	8	2	6	0	25%	96	342	−246
Wales XV	1	0	1	0	0.00%	12	13	−1
West Germany	9	8	1	0	88.89%	199	69	+130
Zimbabwe	4	4	0	0	100%	123	84	+39
Total	515	282	220	13	54.76%	11,609	10,165	+1,444

== Players ==
=== Current squad ===
On 26 October, Romania named a 34-player squad ahead of the 2026 World Rugby Nations Cup European-African-Asian Series.

- Caps updated: 14 November 2026 (after Romania v USA)

Head Coach: (France) David Gérard

Player	Position	Date of birth (age)	Caps	Club/province
Tudor Butnariu	Hooker	12 March 1995 (age 31)	33	(Romania) Timișoara
Adrian Țală	Hooker	13 March 1998 (age 28)	2	(France) Jonzac
Gheorghe Gajion	Prop	13 November 1992 (age 34)	28	(France) Rouen
Iulian Harțig	Prop	11 October 1998 (age 28)	38	(Romania) Dinamo București
Cosmin Manole	Prop	22 October 1995 (age 31)	16	(Romania) Dinamo București
Eduard Matei	Prop		0	(Romania) Timișoara
Alexandru Savin	Prop	12 February 1995 (age 31)	60	(Romania) Rapid
James Scott	Prop	17 March 1999 (age 27)	0	(Romania) Rapid
Joji Sikote	Prop	14 August 1995 (age 31)	1	(Romania) Rapid
Jean-Pierre Smith	Prop	18 June 1997 (age 29)	4	(Romania) Dinamo București
Ștefan Iancu	Lock	7 January 1998 (age 28)	19	(Romania) Timișoara
Andrei Mahu	Lock	3 September 1991 (age 35)	27	(France) Massy
Adrian Moțoc	Lock	11 July 1996 (age 30)	38	(France) Nice
Matthew Tweddle	Lock	1 July 1992 (age 34)	13	(Romania) Rapid
Logan Weidner	Lock	7 February 2002 (age 24)	7	(Romania) Rapid
Bogdan Andreică	Back row		0	(Romania) Rapid
Iacopo Bianchi	Back row	5 May 1998 (age 28)	3	(Italy) Rovigo
Cristi Boboc	Back row	9 October 1995 (age 31)	35	(Romania) Steaua București
Alexander Dinu	Back row	19 November 2001 (age 25)	1	(Romania) Rapid
Adrian Mitu	Back row	12 May 2004 (age 22)	15	(France) Angoulême
Keanan Murray	Back row	15 November 1998 (age 28)	14	(Romania) Dinamo
Mihai Popescu	Back row	29 September 2002 (age 24)	0	(Romania) Dinamo București
Etienne Terblanche	Back row	13 July 1999 (age 27)	2	(Romania) Dinamo
Alin Conache	Scrum-half	7 May 2002 (age 24)	38	(Romania) Steaua București
Toma Mîrzac	Scrum-half	7 May 2002 (age 24)	1	(Romania) Baia Mare
Rares Mîrzac	Scrum-half		0	(Romania) Rapid
Gabriel Rupanu	Scrum-half	28 September 1997 (age 29)	46	(Romania) Timișoara
Ștefan Cojocariu	Fly-half		2	(Romania) Rapid
Daniel Plai	Fly-half	5 September 1994 (age 32)	39	(Romania) Timișoara
Alexandru Bucur	Centre	24 April 1994 (age 32)	24	(Romania) Timișoara
Taylor Gontineac	Centre	16 July 2000 (age 26)	21	(Romania) Castres Olympique
Mihai Graure	Centre	9 January 2003 (age 23)	18	(Romania) Dinamo București
Serge Le Mezec	Centre	25 October 1989 (age 37)	40	(Romania) Dinamo București
Nicolas Onuțu	Centre	27 December 1995 (age 30)	39	(France) RCAV
Atila Septar	Centre	2 June 1996 (age 30)	9	(France) Nice
Fonovai Tangimana	Centre		1	(France) Tarbes
Damian Bonaparte	Wing	2 September 1998 (age 28)	3	(Romania) Steaua București
Tevita Manumua	Wing	12 February 1993 (age 33)	29	(Romania) Timișoara
Ovidiu Neagu	Wing	1 April 2001 (age 25)	9	(Romania) Timișoara
Iliesa Tiqe	Wing	9 April 2001 (age 25)	18	(Romania) Timișoara
Eduard Jumătate	Fullback		0	(France) Stade Français Paris
Marius Simionescu	Fullback	5 September 1997 (age 29)	50	(Romania) Timișoara

=== Notable players ===
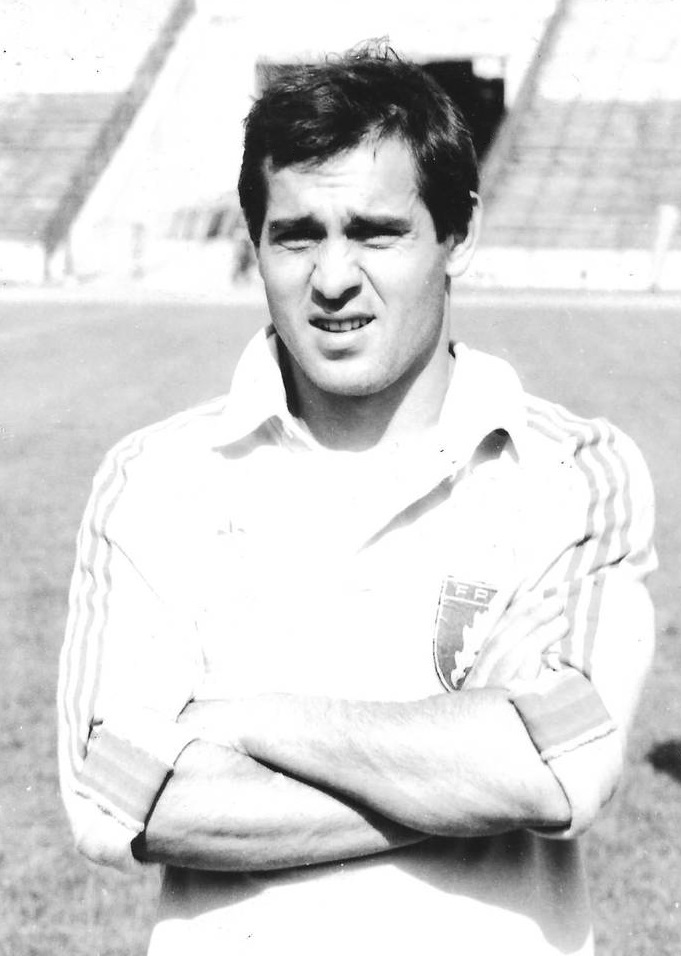
Mircea Paraschiv captained Romania from 1976 to 1987.

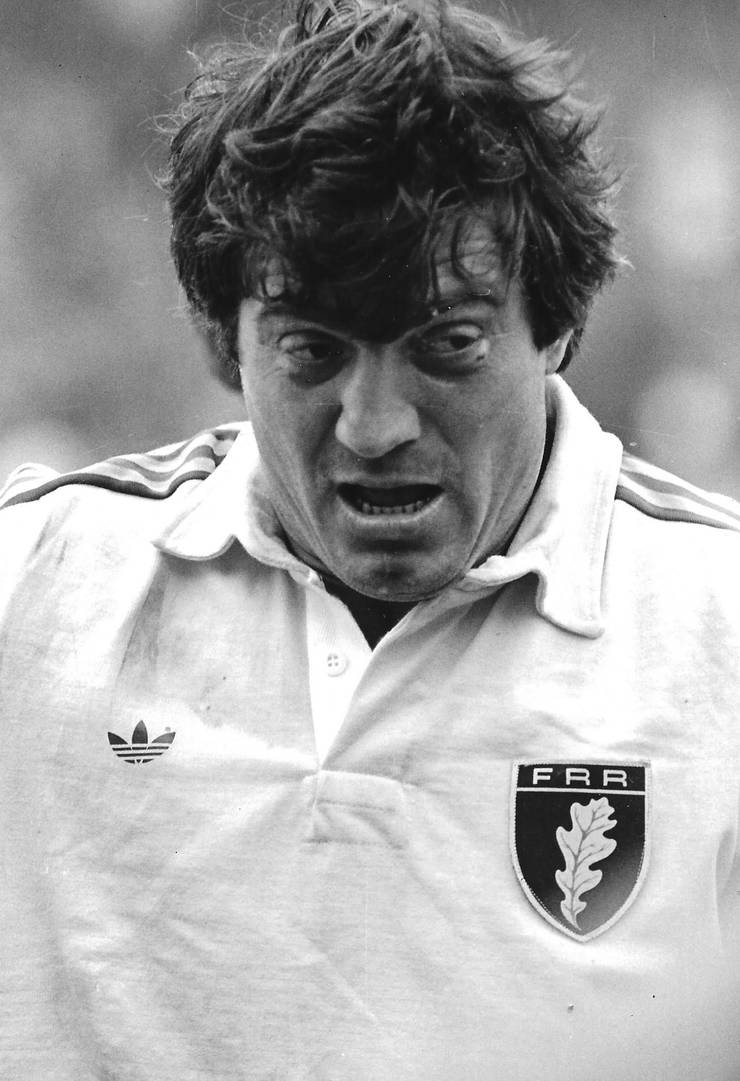
Florică Murariu was one of a number of Romanian rugby internationals who were killed during the Romanian Revolution in December 1989.

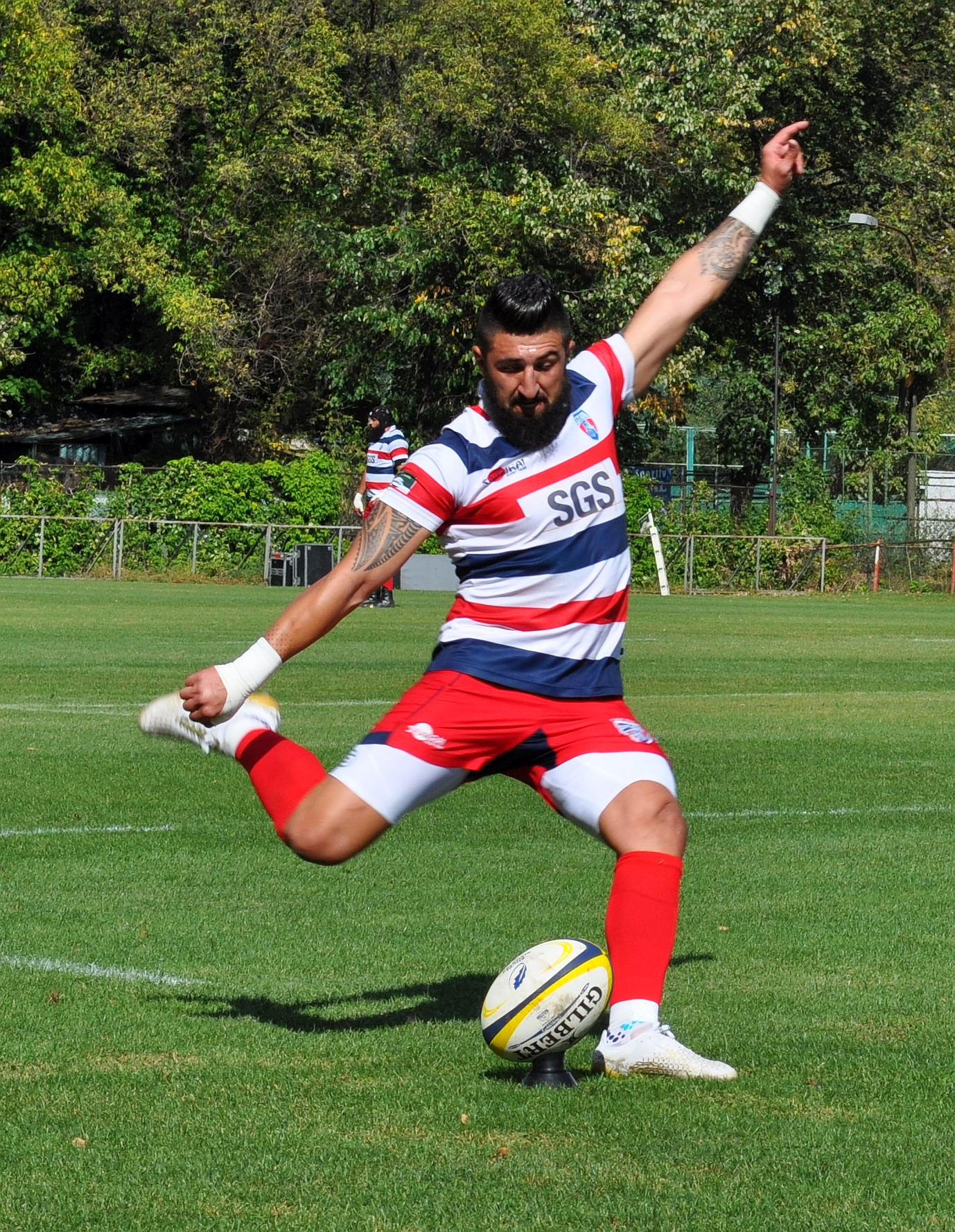
Romania's current top point scorer and most capped player of all time, Florin Vlaicu.

The 1924 Romania Olympic team are the only Romanian inductee to have been inducted into the IRB Hall of Fame. Nicolae Mărăscu captained the Hall of Fame side. The highest point of Mărăscu's career was at the 1924 tournament, earning Romania the bronze medal. He played as a centre and had five caps, without ever scoring, since his first match, in 1919, a 48–5 loss to France, in Paris, for the Inter-Allied Games, and his last, at 22 May 1927, in a 21–5 win over Czechoslovakia, in Bratislava.

Iulian Dumitraș was Romania's main man. Dumitraș was known to be one of the Oaks' most gifted playmakers, with an accurate kicking boot and a penchant for sparking attacks. Having made his test debut in 2002, he went on to start in every match a Rugby World Cup 2007 in France, bringing plenty of experience to the nation. The then standing 1.88m and weighing in a 110 kg, Dumitraș was a punishing runner when he chimes into the line on attack, which he looked to do often, and he provided a solid and dependable last obstacle in defence.

Sorin Socol is regarded by many good judges as the then best player in the current squad and was one of the rocks of the Romanian forward pack. He has captained the most matches to date for Romania, between 2003 and 2011. A total of 61 tests, 36 of them were as captain. He captained Romania for the first time on 30 October 2003 during the 2003 Rugby World Cup match against Namibia. He went on and featured in the 2007 World Cup squad and eventually retired from all international rugby after the 2011 tournament. Socol had one of Romania's highest winning percentage as a captain of 63.88.

Florin Vlaicu is Romania's top ever point scorer and also the most capped player appearing in 104 tests so far. Vlaicu made his international debut in 2006 as a substitute against Ukraine. He played for Romania in the IRB Nations Cup and in their 2007 Rugby World Cup qualifying before appearing for them in the 2007 Rugby World Cup. He played two Tests at the World Cup as a substitute against both Scotland and the All Blacks. He also played at the 2011 and 2015 Rugby World Cups.

Cristian Petre is Romania's most recognized player after dominating the lock position for eleven years. He is one of Romania's most capped player with a total of 92 matches and a career span that started in 2001 against England and ended in 2012 against Italy. Petre has featured in three Rugby World Cups, first in 2003, going on to feature in 2007 and his last being in 2011. Petre has scored a total of six tries and had winning percentage of 55.43.

Cătălin Fercu is generally regarded as one of Romania's true global superstar of rugby union. Fercu is Romania's top try scorers. He had quickly made appearances on the international stage at a very young age and played against France and Scotland in the Autumn internationals in 2006. He also scored a try against the French. Fercu helped guide Romania to the 2007 Rugby World Cup as he played in the qualifier matches including the vital games against Georgia and Spain and scored a try against Spain in the game that sealed their qualification to the Rugby World Cup. Fercu was a late withdrawal from their Rugby World Cup squad in 2011 because he was not prepared to fly all the way to New Zealand. The Romanian side arrived in Christchurch to prepare for their first game of the tournament against Scotland in Invercargill on 10 September without Fercu, who failed to get on the plane when it left Romania.

Another one of the Oaks greatest players are Romeo Gontineac, represented Romania in four Rugby World Cups from 1995 to 2007. The hard running centre, who became the national coach in 2010, was capped 75 times for the nation, scoring 13 tries and a drop goal. During his career he played professionally in Romania, South Africa and France.

==== Members of the 1924 Olympics team ====
- Nicolae Anastasiade
- Dumitru Armășel
- Gheorghe Benția
- J. Cociociaho
- Constantin Crătunescu
- Teodor Florian
- Petre Ghițulescu
- Ion Gîrleșteanu
- Octav Luchide
- Jean Henry Manu
- Nicolae Mărăscu
- Teodor Marian
- Sorin Mihăilescu
- Paul Nedelcovici
- Iosif Nemeș
- Eugen Sfetescu
- Mircea Sfetescu
- Soare Sterian
- Mircea Stroescu
- Atanasie Tănăsescu
- Mihai Vardală
- Paul Vidrașcu
- Dumitru Volvoreanu

== Coaches ==
=== Current coaching staff ===
Correct as of 29 August 2026

Position	Name
Head coach	(France) David Gérard
Forwards coach	(Argentina) Juan Pablo Orlandi
Backs & Attack coach	(France) Raphaël Saint-André
Defence coach	(France) Benjamin Lapeyre

=== Coaching history ===
Years	Coach
1961–1965	(Romania) Petre Cosmănescu
1965–1968	(Romania) Viorel Morariu
1968–1972	(Romania) Petre Cosmănescu
1973–1974	(Romania) Valeriu Irimescu
1974–1981	(Romania) Petre Cosmănescu
1985–1987	(Romania) Theodor Rădulescu
1987–1989	(Romania) Mihai Naca
1989–1990	(Romania) Theodor Rădulescu
1991	(Romania) Peter Ianusevici
1992–1994	(Romania) Theodor Rădulescu
1994–1999	(Romania) Mircea Paraschiv
1999–2001	(Romania) Eduard Suciu
2002–2003	(France) Bernard Charreyre
2004	(France) Phillipe Sauton
2004	(France) Robert Antonin
2005–2007	(France) Daniel Santamans
2007–2008	(Romania) Marin Moț
2008–2009	(New Zealand) Ellis Meachen
2009	(Romania) Marin Moț
2009–2010	(France) Serge Lairle
2010–2011	(Romania) Romeo Gontineac
2012	(Romania) Haralambie Dumitraș
2013–2018	(Wales) Lynn Howells
2018	(France) Thomas Lièvremont
2019	(Romania) Marius Țincu (interim)
2019–2022	(England) Andy Robinson
2022–2023	(Romania) Eugen Apjok
2024–	(France) David Gérard

== Individual all-time records ==
=== Most caps ===
#	Player	Pos	Span	Mat	Start	Sub	Won	Lost	Draw	%
1	Florin Vlaicu	Centre	2006–2022	129	103	26	79	47	3	62.89
2	Cătălin Fercu	Fullback	2005–2020	109	107	2	73	33	3	68.34
3	Florin Surugiu	Scrum-half	2008–2024	108	68	40	64	43	1	62.35
4	Mihai Macovei	Flanker	2006–2023	104	93	11	60	43	1	58.98
5	Valentin Calafeteanu	Scrum-half	2004–2019	100	54	46	61	37	2	62.00
6	Cristian Petre	Lock	2001–2012	92	83	9	50	40	2	55.43
7	Csaba Gál	Centre	2005–2015	88	65	23	49	37	2	56.81
8	Valentin Popârlan	Lock	2007–2020	77	50	27	48	29	0	62.33
9	Romeo Gontineac	Centre	1995–2008	76	75	1	35	41	0	46.05
9	Adrian Lungu	Centre	1980–1995	76	75	1	40	36	0	52.63
9	Lucian Sîrbu	Scrum-half	1996–2011	76	62	14	40	34	2	53.94

Last updated: United States vs Romania, 6 July 2024. Statistics include officially capped matches only.

=== Most tries ===
#	Player	Pos	Span	Mat	Start	Sub	Pts	Tries
1	Cătălin Fercu	Fullback	2005–2020	109	107	2	171	33
2	Gabriel Brezoianu	Centre	1996–2007	71	67	4	142	28
3	Mihai Macovei	Flanker	2006–2023	104	93	11	110	22
4	Ionut Dumitru	Centre	2013–2022	55	49	6	85	17
5	Marius Simionescu	Fullback	2017-	51	48	3	80	16
6	Ovidiu Tonița	Flanker	2000–2016	73	67	6	75	15
7	Petre Mitu	Scrum-half	1996–2009	41	36	5	339	14
7	Cristian Săuan	Wing	1999–2007	37	32	5	70	14
7	Marius Țincu	Hooker	2002–2012	53	49	4	70	14
7	Florin Vlaicu	Centre	2006–2022	129	103	26	1025	14

Last updated: Romania vs Canada, 20 November 2026. Statistics include officially capped matches only.

=== Most points ===
#	Player	Pos	Span	Mat	Pts	Tries	Conv	Pens	Drop
1	Florin Vlaicu	Centre	2006–2022	129	1321	14	173	203	4
2	Dănuț Dumbravă	Fly-half	2002–2015	73	389	3	73	74	2
3	Petre Mitu	Scrum-half	1996–2009	41	339	14	55	53	0
4	Ionuţ Tofan	Fly-half	1997–2007	60	316	12	53	46	4
5	Valentin Calafeteanu	Scrum-half	2004–2019	100	233	11	32	37	1
6	Alin Conache	Scrum-half	2023–	39	222	3	42	41	0
7	Neculai Nichitean	Fly-half	1990–1997	28	201	0	18	45	10
8	Ionel Melinte	Fullback	2018–2024	29	176	9	37	19	0
9	Cătălin Fercu	Fullback	2005–2020	109	171	33	1	1	0
10	Gelu Ignat	Fly-half	1986–1992	25	148	1	15	32	6

Last updated: Romania vs Canada, 20 November 2026. Statistics include officially capped matches only.

=== Most matches as captain ===
#	Player	Pos	Span	Mat	Won	Lost	Draw	%	Pts	Tries
1	Mihai Macovei	Flanker	2012–2023	72	47	24	1	68.10	105	21
2	Sorin Socol	Lock	2001–2011	36	22	12	2	63.88	25	5
3	Stelian Burcea	Flanker	2009–2018	19	13	6	0	68.42	15	3
4	Mircea Paraschiv	Scrum-half	1980–1987	18	7	10	1	41.66	16	4
5	Haralambie Dumitras	Number 8	1989–1993	14	5	9	0	35.71	20	5
5	Romeo Gontineac	Centre	1999–2003	14	4	10	0	28.57	5	1
7	Tiberiu Brînză	Number 8	1994–1997	13	1	12	0	7.69	5	1
8	Marius Țincu	Hooker	2007–2012	11	5	6	0	45.45	0	0
9	Costica Mersoiu	Number 8	2007–2008	10	6	4	0	60.00	5	1
10	Alin Petrache	Number 8	1999–2004	7	3	4	0	42.85	0	0

Last updated: United States vs Romania, 6 July 2024. Statistics include officially capped matches only.

=== Most points in a match ===
#	Player	Pos	Pts	Tries	Conv	Pens	Drop	Opposition	Venue	Date
1	Ionuţ Tofan	Fly-half	32	2	8	2	0	Spain	(Romania) Iași	05/10/2002
2	Virgil Popisteanu	Fly-half	27	0	12	1	0	Portugal	(Romania) Bucharest	13/04/1996
2	Petre Mitu	Scrum-half	27	1	2	6	0	Portugal	(Portugal) Lisbon	04/02/2001
4	Ionel Rotaru	Wing	25	5	0	0	0	Portugal	(Romania) Bucharest	13/04/1996
5	Florin Vlaicu	Fullback	24	1	8	0	1	Czech Republic	(Romania) Bucharest	22/03/2008
5	Florin Vlaicu	Centre	24	1	2	5	0	Russia	(Romania) Bucharest	09/02/2013
7	Gelu Ignat	Fly-half	22	0	5	4	0	Netherlands	(Italy) Treviso	30/09/1990
7	Petre Mitu	Scrum-half	22	1	4	3	0	Russia	(Romania) Bârlad	18/03/2001
7	Ionuţ Tofan	Fly-half	22	1	1	5	0	Russia	(Russia) Krasnodar	24/03/2002
10	5 players on 21 points									

Last updated: United States vs Romania, 6 July 2024. Statistics include officially capped matches only.

=== Most tries in a match ===
#	Player	Pos	Pts	Tries	Conv	Pens	Drop	Opposition	Venue	Date
1	Gheorgie Rascanu	Flanker	20	5	0	0	0	Morocco	(Romania) Bucharest	02/05/1972
1	Cornel Popescu	Wing	20	5	0	0	0	Portugal	(Romania) Bârlad	18/10/1986
1	Ionel Rotaru	Wing	25	5	0	0	0	Portugal	(Romania) Bucharest	13/04/1996
4	Petre Motrescu	Wing	16	4	0	0	0	Italy	(Romania) Bucharest	01/05/1977
4	Gheorghe Solomie	Wing	20	4	0	0	0	Belgium	(Belgium) Brussels	04/10/1997
4	Lucian Colceriu	Wing	20	4	0	0	0	Poland	(Romania) Bucharest	02/05/1998
7	11 players on 3 tries									

Last updated: United States vs Romania, 6 July 2024. Statistics include officially capped matches only.

== Media coverage ==
Romania's Rugby Europe Championship matches, mid year internationals and end of year internationals are currently televised by TVR.

== Kits and symbols ==
Romania usually wears a yellow shirt with blue shorts and red socks as home uniform, with the exceptions being at the 1924 Olympic Games in Paris, where a light blue shirt with the Royal coat of arms was worn, as well in the 2003 Rugby World Cup, where a blue uniform was worn in all of the matches. Since 2014, the jerseys are adorned with Romanian traditional embroidering motifs and Dacian patterns.

The origins of the oak leaf as symbol for the Romanian team date from 1979, after former Romanian international player Viorel Morariu and then-president of Federația Română de Rugby, decided, with the consultation of specialists, that an oak leaf would be the team emblem (as during the tours in the British Isles and Ireland, the Communist coat of arms painted on the Romanian players' shirts became unrecognisable due to the rain). The Latin word for oak, "robur", also meant "strength" in that same language. In 1980, a new badge, a shield with an oak leaf (which made the Romanian team be nicknamed "Stejarii", which means "the oaks") and the acronym "FRR" on the top. The adoption of said emblem could be also seen as an act of defiance towards the then-ruling regime in Romania, whose approval was given to the Romanian federations's requests to be affiliated to the IRFB. After the 2003 Rugby World Cup, the oak leaf was seen without the shield, usually accompanied by the inscription "Rugby Romania".

2003-2010 emblem

== Kit suppliers ==
Period	Kit manufacturer	Shirt sponsor
1919–1985	No supplier	No shirt sponsor
1985–1988	Adidas	No shirt sponsor
1988–1989	Bukta	No shirt sponsor
1989–1993	Adidas	Rank Xerox
1994–1996	Gilbert	No shirt sponsor
1996–1997	Puma AG	No shirt sponsor
1997–2001	Gilbert	No shirt sponsor
2002	Gilbert	Petrom
2003–2008	O'Neills	Orange
2009	O'Neills	No shirt sponsor
2010	O'Neills	CEC Bank
2011	KooGa	CEC Bank
2012	Tall Ball	CEC Bank
2012	Samurai Sportswear (worn in the 2012 end of the year internationals)	CEC Bank
2013–2016	BLK	CEC Bank
2016–2019	Mizuno	CEC Bank
2020	Tall Ball	CEC Bank
2021	Macron	CEC Bank
2021	Macron	Stanleybet (worn in the 2021 mid-year internationals)
2021–	Macron	No shirt sponsor
2023	Macron	Kaufland

== See also ==
- Rugby union in Romania
- Romanian Rugby Federation
- List of Romania national rugby union players
- Romania national rugby sevens team
- Romania women's national rugby sevens team
- Romania women's national rugby union team
- Romania national under-20 rugby union team
- Sport in Romania
