= Steward-ownership =

Corporate ownership model

Steward-ownership structures a company's ownership in a way that separates economic rights (related to money) from voting rights (related to decision-making power). Steward-ownership is considered an alternative to shareholder primacy models. Steward-ownership can be implemented using different legal forms depending on the type of company and jurisdiction.

Steward-owned companies are also referred to as "self-owned", "foundation-owned" or "trust-owned". Examples include Sharetribe (Finland), Mozilla (US), Novo Nordisk (Denmark), and Bosch (Germany).

== Origins and intent ==
The intent behind steward-ownership can be traced back to the early 20th century, when entrepreneurs like Robert Bosch transferred their companies into foundation ownership structures. Bosch's goal was to ensure that his company would continue to operate in the interests of its employees, society, and the environment, even after his death.

Similarly, when Ernst Abbe, a fellow researcher at Carl Zeiss AG, created the Carl Zeiss Foundation in 1889, his intention was to ensure that the company's profits would be reinvested in research and development or donated to social causes, rather than being extracted by shareholders.

In 2017, the term "steward-ownership" was coined by the German Purpose Foundation, following a study of early steward-ownership models, such as Bosch and Zeiss. This initiative included outlining the common principles shared by these companies, thus providing a definition of steward-ownership.

The aim of steward-ownership is to ensure that decisions are made by people who are closely connected to the company's operations and purpose, rather than being driven mainly by the goal of increasing shareholder value. In steward-owned companies, profit is seen as a means to achieve the company's purpose, not as the ultimate goal.

== Principles ==
Steward-ownership is a corporate ownership structure that prioritizes the long-term independence and purpose of a company. While the legal implementation may vary, all steward-owned companies make a legally binding commitment to two core principles: self-governance and purpose-driven profit allocation.

- Self-governance: In steward-owned companies, control of the company remains with people who are actively involved in the business. In this sense, voting rights are held by stewards, who are connected to the operations or mission of the business and who are deemed most aligned and capable to run the business. Unlike common ownership models, voting shares cannot be speculatively sold or automatically inherited by individuals. They are rather passed on in trust to individuals closely connected to the business.
- Purpose-driven profit allocation: In steward-owned companies, the value of the company cannot be extracted by shareholders for their personal benefit. Profits are always reinvested in the business, used to cover capital costs, shared with stakeholders, or donated to charities. This allows companies to focus on their purpose rather than solely focusing on profit maximization.

Steward-owned companies commit to these principles for the long term, in a legally binding way.

== Legal implementation ==
To implement steward-ownership, companies structure their legal and ownership framework in a way that incorporates the principles of self-governance and purpose-driven profit allocation. This is achieved by separating the voting rights and economic rights of the company. Control (voting rights) is exercised by the steward-owners, profits stay within the company to serve its purpose.

The specific legal models used to implement steward-ownership can vary depending on the jurisdiction and the type of company. In most cases, a legally functioning entity, such as a limited liability company or a corporation, is owned by a foundation or trust in a specific form. Cooperatives can also be structured to adhere to steward-ownership principles.

Steward-ownership has been implemented through various models, each designed to suit different legal jurisdictions and company types. The fundamental models are:

- Single Foundation: A self-governing non-profit foundation owns both the voting rights and dividend rights of a company. The foundation's primary purpose is to further the company's development and purpose while adhering to steward-ownership principles.
- Double Foundation: This model involves three legal entities: the operating company and two foundations or legal holding entities. One entity, managed by the company's stewards, holds the voting rights but no economic rights. The other, a charitable entity, holds the economic rights and the majority of capital shares but no voting rights. This legal structure allows for the separation of power and money.
- Golden Share/Veto Share: The principles of steward-ownership are explicitly stated in the company's articles of association. 99% of the voting rights are held by stewards, while an independent entity holds the remaining 1% as a "veto-share" or "golden-share". This entity has the right and responsibility to veto any changes or actions that contradict steward-ownership principles. Dividend and economic rights remain with the company or can be allocated to designated stakeholder groups.
- Perpetual Purpose Trust: Unlike conventional trusts, a Perpetual Purpose Trust (PPT) is established to serve a specific purpose rather than individual beneficiaries and is designed to operate indefinitely. In steward-ownership, the PPT owns the shares in the operating company, with trustees exercising control without entitlement to the company's value or profits.
- Employee Ownership Trust: Employee ownership is a special form of steward-ownership where employees are granted more decision-making power and control. An employee ownership trust holds the shares of the operating company, with employees indirectly overseeing and controlling the trust.

== Steward-owned companies ==
Steward-ownership is applicable to businesses of varying shapes and sizes. Steward-owned businesses are present in regions such as Europe, North and South America.

In Denmark, a substantial proportion of companies are predominantly owned by entities known as "industrial foundations". Denmark accommodates approximately 1,000 companies operating under the steward-ownership model, and these entities contribute to approximately 60% of the total value of the Danish stock market index. Prominent examples include Carlsberg, Lundbeck, Novo Nordisk, and AP Moller Maersk.

Examples of steward-owned companies in Germany include Bosch, Zeiss, and Ecosia, a Berlin-based search engine that plants trees that transitioned to steward-ownership in 2018.

Steward-owned companies in the United States encompass companies such as the web browser provider Mozilla, Organically Grown Company, the messenger app Signal and Patagonia.

Additional, international examples of steward-ownership include the British department store John Lewis, the Dutch ethical bank Triodos, and Ikea (Sweden, Netherlands and Luxembourg).

== See also ==
- Stewardship
- Enterprise Foundation
- Business Purpose
- Corporate Governance
- Social Enterprises
