= Jaime Alonso =

Spanish rugby union player (born 1973)

- Born: April 29, 1973 (age 53) Valladolid, Spain
- Height: 5 ft 9 in (1.75 m)
- Weight: 167 lb (76 kg)

Rugby union career
- Position(s): Scrum-half, Fullback
Senior career
Years	Team	Apps	(Points)
- El Salvador Rugby
International career
Years	Team	Apps	(Points)
1999-2003	Spain	16	(28)

Jaime Alonso-Lasheras Rivero (born Valladolid, 29 April 1973) is a Spanish rugby union player. He plays as a scrum-half.

== Career ==
His first international cap was during a match against Japan, at Tokyo, on August 29, 1999. He was part of the 1999 Rugby World Cup roster, playing the match against Uruguay, at Galashiels. His last international cap was during a match against USA, at Madrid, on April 12, 2003.
