= Nicolae Mărăscu =

Romania international rugby union player

- Born: September 5, 1898 Bucharest, Romania
- Died: November 8, 1938 (aged 40)

Rugby union career
- Position: Centre
International career
Years	Team	Apps	(Points)
1919–1927	Romania	5	
Medal record
Men's rugby union
Representing Romania
Olympic Games
Bronze medal – third place	1924 Paris	Team competition

Nicolae Mărăscu (September 5, 1898 – November 8, 1938) was a Romanian rugby union footballer. Born in Bucharest, he played as a centre.

Mărăscu had 5 caps for the newcomer Romania, without ever scoring, since his first match, in 1919, a 48–5 loss to France XV, in Paris, for the Inter-Allied Games, and his last, at 22 May 1927, in a 21–5 win over Czechoslovakia, in Bratislava.

The highest point of Mărăscu career was at the 1924 Olympic Tournament, when Romania, even losing to France (59–3) and the United States (39–0) still won the bronze medal by finishing in 3rd place. Mărăscu was the captain of the Romanian team. It was the last time that rugby union appeared at the Olympic Games.

He played in France for Stade Français and Olympique lillois.

== See also ==
- List of Romania national rugby union players
