= David Mateus =

Portuguese rugby union player

- Born: 7 February 1980 (age 46) Lisbon
- Height: 6 ft 1 in (1.85 m)
- Weight: 213 lb (97 kg)
- Notable relative: Diogo Mateus (twin)

Rugby union career
International career
Years	Team	Apps	(Points)
2003–2010	Portugal	37	(20)
National sevens team
Years	Team		Comps
- Portugal

David Mateus (born 7 February 1980) is a Portuguese rugby union footballer. His position in the field is as a wing or center.

He played for Belenenses. Mateus has a twin brother, Diogo Mateus, with whom he played in the 2008 Hong Kong Sevens as part of the Portugal national rugby union team.

He had 37 caps for Portugal, from 2003 to 2010, scoring 4 tries, 20 points on aggregate. He was present at the "Lobos" squad that entered the 2007 Rugby World Cup, where he played in the matches against Scotland and Italy, without scoring.
