= Thierry Teixeira =

Portugal international rugby union player

Thierry Teixeira (born 1 June 1971) is a French-born Portuguese former rugby union player. He played as a scrum-half.

He played for FCS Rumilly (1993/94), RC Strasbourg (1996/97–1997/98), CA Périgueux (1998/99–2001/01), RC Nîmes (2001/02), Pays d'Aix Rugby Club (2002/03), and once again for RC Nîmes (2003/04–2004/05).

He was born in France but decided to play for Portugal at international level. He had 8 caps for Portugal, but he still scored 1 try, 1 conversion, 19 penalties and 1 drop goal, 69 points on aggregate. He had his first game at the 17–21 loss to Spain, at 2 December 1998, in Edinburgh, for the 1999 Rugby World Cup qualifyings, in a game where he scored a try, a conversion and a penalty. He became known for scoring 9 penalties, equalizing the world record, and a drop goal, 30 points on aggregate, in the 32–30 win over Georgia, at 8 February 2000, in Lisbon, for the Six Nations B. It is still the national record for points scored in a game. He had his last game at the 13–11 loss to Netherlands, at 2 April 2000, in Amsterdam, for the Six Nations B
