= Simion Vartolomeu =

Romanian sports shooter

Personal information
- Born: 24 June 1891 Vutcani, Kingdom of Romania
- Died: Unknown

Sport
- Sport: Sports shooting

Simion Vartolomeu (born 24 June 1891, date of death unknown) was a Romanian sports shooter. He competed in three events at the 1924 Summer Olympics.
