= Constantin Țenescu =

Romanian sports shooter

Personal information
- Born: 1893
- Died: Unknown

Sport
- Sport: Sports shooting

Constantin Țenescu (born 1893, date of death unknown) was a Romanian sports shooter. He competed in three events at the 1924 Summer Olympics.
