= Haralambie Dumitraș =

Romania international rugby union player & coach

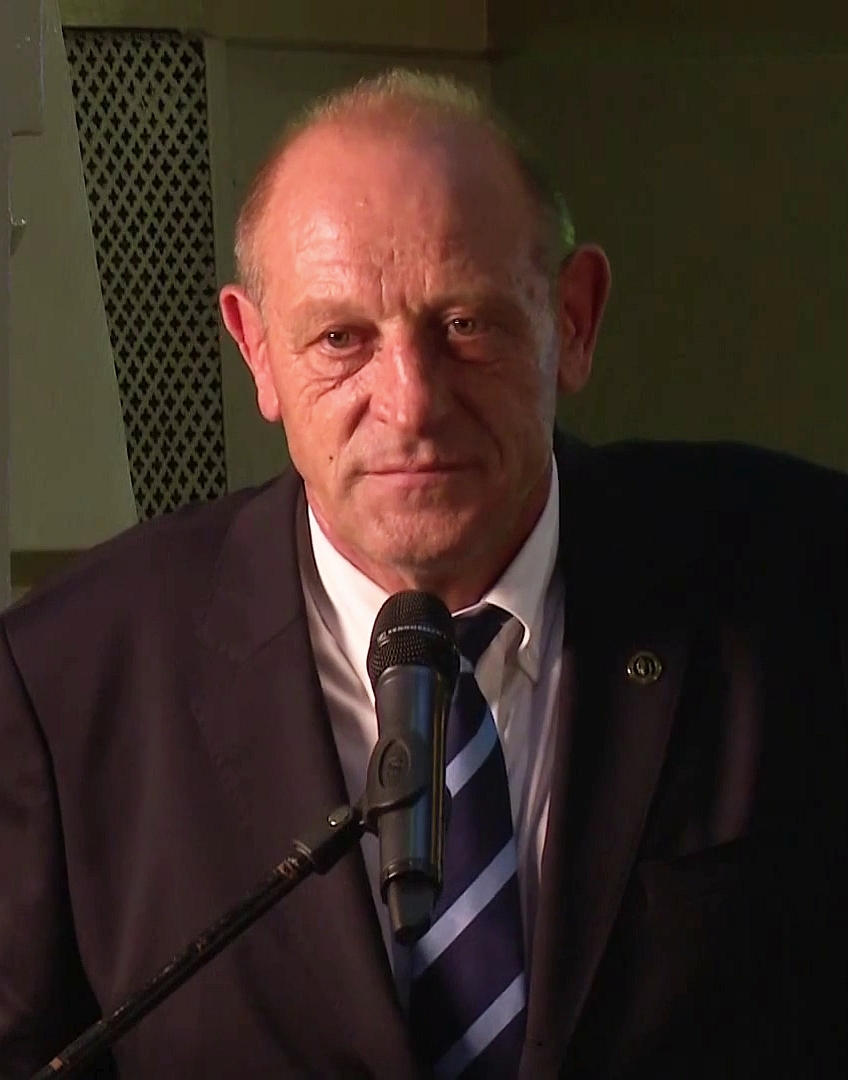
- Dumitraș during a press conference at Romania's squad announcement for the 2015 Rugby World Cup.
- Born: 11 February 1960 (age 66) Siret, Romania
- Height: 1.92 m (6 ft 4 in)
- Weight: 96 kg (15 st 2 lb)
- Notable relative: Iulian Dumitraș (son)

Rugby union career
- Position: No. 8
Senior career
Years	Team	Apps	(Points)
1981–1986	Bucovina Suceava		
1986–1990	Contactoare Buzău		
1990–1995	Section Paloise		
1995–2000	RC Strasbourg		
International career
Years	Team	Apps	(Points)
1984–1993	Romania	47	(30)
Coaching career
- Years: Team
- 1995–2000: RC Strasbourg (player coach)
- 2001–2002: Pontarlier
- 2002–2003: Romania (assistant)
- 2004–2005: CA Périgueux
- 2005–2008: Entente Astarac Bigorre
- 2009–2010: US Argelès
- 2010–2011: Romania U19 (technical director)
- 2011–2012: Romania

Haralambie Dumitraș (born 11 February 1960), also known as Hari Dumitraș, is a Romanian former rugby union player and current coach. He played as number eight.

== Professional career ==
He played for Section Paloise and RC Strasbourg in France.

Dumitraș was a leading name for Romania during the "Golden Era" of the 1980s. He had 47 caps, from 1984 to 1993, scoring 7 tries, 30 points in aggregate. He was the captain in 13 games. He was called for the 1987 Rugby World Cup, playing in two games, without scoring, and for the 1991 Rugby World Cup, playing in all the three games and scoring a try in the 17–15 win over Fiji at 12 October 1991.

On 4 April 1994, Dumitraș was selected to play for the Barbarians in their match against Swansea at St Helen's.

After finishing his player career, he became a coach. He settled in France, where he was one of the two head coaches of CA Périgueux. He afterwards went to coach Entente Astarac Bigorre XV, RC Strasbourg and US Argelésienne.

He was briefly the head coach of the Romania national team in 2011 and later served as president of the Romanian Rugby Federation.

== Personal life ==
In 1979, while serving his military service at Steaua, Dumitraș was encouraged to try rugby by Colonel Petre Cosmănescu, the club's renowned head coach and a senior army officer. His son, Iulian, is also a professional rugby player who represented Romania at the 2007 and 2011 Rugby World Cups.

Sporting positions
Preceded by (Romania) Romeo Gontineac	Romania National Rugby Union Coach; 2012	Succeeded by (Wales) Lynn Howells
