= Petre Mitu =

Romania international rugby union player

- Born: 22 March 1977 (age 49) Bucharest, Romania
- Height: 1.75 m (5 ft 9 in)
- Weight: 85 kg (187 lb)

Rugby union career
- Position(s): Scrumhalf, Fullback
Senior career
Years	Team	Apps	(Points)
1996–1999	CSA Steaua		
1999–2002	Stade Aurillacois		
2002–2003	FC Grenoble		
2003–2005	Stade Poitevin		
2005–2006	Tarbes Pyrénées		
2006–2010	US Montauban		
2010–2012	CA Castelsarrasin		
2012–2013	RAC Angérien		
International career
Years	Team	Apps	(Points)
1996–2009	Romania	41	(339)

Petre Mitu (born 22 March 1977 in Bucharest) is a Romanian former rugby union fullback. A one time captain of the national team, Mitu played as both a fullback and scrum half during his career. He was also their goalkicker, helping Romania qualify for the 1999 Rugby World Cup with 80 points during qualifying.

An injury in 2001 saw him lose the goalkicking duties to Ionuț Tofan and soon after he announced his retirement despite being just 25 years of age. He finished his international career with 34 caps for Romania and a total of 288 points (the highest total for a scrum half, as of October 2008).

== Honours ==
=== Club ===
Steaua Bucharest

- SuperLiga champion: 1998/99

=== International ===
Romania

- European Nations Cup (3): 2000, 2002, 2006
