= Andriy Kovalenco =

Spain, Ukraine & USSR international rugby union player

- Born: July 12, 1971 (age 55) Kyiv, Ukraine
- Height: 5 ft 11 in (1.80 m)
- Weight: 201 lb (91 kg)
- Occupation: Translator

Rugby union career
- Position(s): Flyhalf, Centre
Amateur team(s)
Years	Team	Apps	(Points)
1987-1989	Aviator Kyiv		
1989-91	VVA Moscow		
1991-94	Aviator Kyiv		
Senior career
Years	Team	Apps	(Points)
1994-04	CRC Madrid Noroeste		
2004-06	Barcelona Universitari Club		
2006-08	FC Barcelona Rugby		
2008-09	Barcelona Universitari Club		
International career
Years	Team	Apps	(Points)
1990-1991	USSR	3	(0)
	Ukraine	12	
1998-2006	Spain	37	(220)

Andriy Kovalenco (born 12 July 1971, in Kyiv) is a Ukrainian-born Spanish rugby union player. He plays as a fly-half.

== Career ==
Kovalenco started playing rugby at 14 years old, in Aviator Kiev, where he had his first game for the premier team aged only 16. He played for Aviator Kyiv from 1987/88 to 1988/89. Due to the military service he had to move to VVA Moscow, the Army team, where he would play from 1989/90 to 1990/91. He won one Soviet League title and two Soviet Cups with VVA Moscow. He had his first game for the USSR in 1990, aged only 19 years old. He then returned to Aviator Kyiv, playing there from 1991/92 to 1993/94. He then moved to the Spanish side of CRC Madrid Noroeste, that he would represent most of his career, from 1994/95 to 2003/04. He won the Spanish League in 1999/2000 and three titles of the Copa del Rey, in 2001, 2002 and 2003. He also would play for Barcelona Universitari Club, from 2004/05 to 2005/06, FC Barcelona Rugby, from 2006/07 to 2007/08, and once again for Barcelona Universitari Club, since 2008/09.

Kovalenco played for three National Teams, the Soviet Union, Ukraine and after becoming a Spanish citizen, Spain. He had 37 caps during this time, being one of the highest scoring players for Spain during his international career, from 1998 to 2006, with 2 tries, 11 conversions, 49 penalties and 1 drop goal, for an aggregate of 220 points.

He played two games for Spain at the 1999 Rugby World Cup, scoring 5 penalties, all the entire 15 points score in the 27–15 loss to Uruguay, and 18 points in the win against Portugal.
