= Ferran Velazco =

- Born: 23 June 1976 (age 50) Sant Boi de Llobregat, Barcelona
- Height: 5 ft 11 in (1.80 m)
- Weight: 176 lb (80 kg)

Rugby union career
- Position: Fullback
Senior career
Years	Team	Apps	(Points)
199?-2002	UE Santboiana		
2002-2005	C.R. El Salvador		
2005/2006	UE Santboiana		
International career
Years	Team	Apps	(Points)
1997-2006	Spain	57	(87)

Ferran Velazco i Querol (born 23 June 1976) is a Spanish rugby union player. He plays as a fullback.

Velazco played for UE Santboiana since his youth, except for a five-year stint with El Salvador Rugby between 2002 and 2005, where he won the Spanish Championship for five times, in 9195/96, 1996/97, 2002/03, 2003/04 and 2005/06.

He had 57 caps for Spain, from 1997 to 2006, scoring 13 tries, 2 conversions, 2 penalties and 2 drop goals, in an aggregate of 87 points. He played two games at the 1999 Rugby World Cup, scoring a penalty in the 47-3 defeat to South Africa. He was also a recurring member in Spain sevens.
