= Gabriel Brezoianu =

Romanian retired rugby union player

- Born: 18 January 1977 (age 49) Bucharest, Romania
- Height: 1.75 m (5 ft 9 in)
- Weight: 86 kg (13 st 8 lb)

Rugby union career
- Position: Centre
Youth career
- 1988–1995: Locomotiva București
Senior career
Years	Team	Apps	(Points)
1995–1999	Timișoara		
1999–2000	Steaua		
2000	Poli Iași		
2000–2003	Bordeaux		
2003–2006	US Dax		
2006–2007	Racing Métro		
2007–2008	Tarbes		
International career
Years	Team	Apps	(Points)
1996–2007	Romania	71	(142)

Gabriel Brezoianu (born 18 January 1977 in Bucharest) is a Romanian retired rugby union player.

He began his club career with Timișoara (1995/99), then played for Steaua Bucharest (1999/00). He then moved to France, playing for Bègles-Bordeaux (2000/03), US Dax (2003/06), Racing Métro 92 Paris (2006/07) and Tarbes Pyrénées Rugby (2007/08).

Brezoianu played his first game for Romania on 20 April 1996, in an 83–5 win against Belgium.

He played at three Rugby World Cup finals, in 1999, 2003 and 2007.

He has 71 caps for Romania, from 1996 to 2007, with 28 tries scored and 1 conversion, 142 points in aggregate.

== Honours ==
Romania

- European Nations Cup (2): 2000, 2002
