= Romeo Gontineac =

Romania international rugby union player

- Born: Romeo Ștefan Gontineac; 18 December 1973 (age 52) Botoşani, Romania
- Height: 1.75 m (5 ft 9 in)
- Notable relative: Taylor Gontineac (son)

Rugby union career
- Position: Centre
Youth career
- CFR Pașcani
Senior career
Years	Team	Apps	(Points)
1993–1996	Universitatea Cluj		
1996	South Western Districts		
1996–1997	FC Grenoble		
1997–1998	Pau		
1998–2010	Aurillac		
International career
Years	Team	Apps	(Points)
1995–2008	Romania	76	(68)
Coaching career
- Years: Team
- 2010–2011: Romania
- 2020–: Aurillac

Romeo Ștefan Gontineac (born 18 December 1973 in Botoşani) is a Romanian rugby union coach and former professional player who played as a centre. He currently coaches the French club Aurillac.

== Biography ==
Gontineac was introduced to rugby by his father at the age of six. He began his senior career with Universitatea Cluj in Romania (1993–96) and then played for South Western Districts in South Africa. He subsequently moved to France, where he played for FC Grenoble (1996–97), Section Paloise (1997–98), and Aurillac (1998–2010), concluding his playing career there.

He earned 76 caps for Romania, scoring 13 tries for a total of 68 points. He played in every match for Romania in four Rugby World Cups: 1995, 1999, 2003, and 2007. He also captained his country on several occasions.

In May 2010, Gontineac was appointed head coach of the Romanian national team, replacing France's Serge Lairle. He brought in former All Black Steve McDowall as his assistant coach during the qualifiers for the 2011 Rugby World Cup. Romania qualified but had a disappointing tournament.

In January 2020, he was named head coach of Pro D2 side Aurillac.

== Personal life ==
His older brother, Marcel, was also a rugby union player and is now a coach who has worked with clubs in Romania and Italy. Gontineac is married to Lucinda, a South African woman he met while signing autographs at the 1995 Rugby World Cup. They married the following year and have two children: a son, Taylor, who is also a professional rugby player, and a daughter, Olivia-Rose (born 2003).

== See also ==
- List of international rugby union families

Sporting positions
Preceded by (France) Serge Lairle	Romanian National Rugby Union Coach; 2010 – 2011	Succeeded by (Romania) Hari Dumitras
