= 2014–2016 European Nations Cup Third Division =

2014–16 European Nations Cup Third Division
- Date: 2014–2016
- Countries: Division 3: Belarus; Estonia; Greece; Montenegro; Slovakia
- Champions: Slovakia (2015); Estonia (2016)

Tournament statistics
- Matches played: 8
- Tries scored: 82 (10.25 per match)
- Top scorer(s): (Estonia) Luke Veebel (72)
- Most tries: (Estonia) Luke Veebel (11)
- Website: Rugby Europe

The 2014–16 European Nations Cup Third Division is the fourth tier of rugby union in Europe behind the Six Nations Championship and the 2014–16 European Nations Cup First Division and the 2014–16 European Nations Cup Second Division.

Slovakia return from the 2012–14 European Nations Cup Third Division, and are joined by the relegated Greece, as well as Belarus, Estonia and Montenegro. 2012–14 champions, Turkey are promoted to ENC 2D, while Azerbaijan have decided not to compete in this tournament.

Belarus played their first international rugby union match; a qualifier against Estonia, who will also be playing in their first ENC tournament. The winner of this match (Estonia) played in a semi final-final format tournament against Montenegro and Slovakia 2014–2015 title. Greece withdrew from the tournament, and was replaced by a Montenegrin President's XV. The format for the 2015–2016 tournament has yet to be decided.

The best team over the 2014–15 and 2015–16 championships will be promoted to Division 2D of the European Nations Cup for the 2016–2018 cup.

Slovakia won the third Division in 2015 by beating Montenegro in the final 31–3. Estonia won the title in 2016 by beating Slovakia in the final 36–29.

== 2014–15 ==
=== Qualifying play-off ===
4 October 2014	Estonia	59–12	Belarus	Kalevi Keskstaadion, Tallinn, Estonia
14:00	Try: Luke Veebel 3 (4'c, 26'c, 61'c), Jaan Lorens 2 (20', 23'c), Roland Kalso (35'), Marten Martinson (53'c), Mark Zuhhovitski (66'c), Maati Pallas (78'c); Con: David-Sandro Dzidzadze 6, Marten Martinson	Team Sheet	Try: Ilya Shuhayeu (32'), Aliaksandr Varabei (80'c); Con: Dzmitry Shabetsko; Cards: Aliaksandr Varabei (yellow card) 55' to 65', Artur Zharkevich (yellow card) 59' to 69'	Attendance: 100; Referee: (Russia) Alexei Bryzgalin

=== Finals ===
The original format included top seeds Greece, second seeds Slovakia, third seeds and hosts Montenegro and qualifiers Estonia. Greece were drawn against Estonia, and Slovakia against Montenegro. However, after the withdrawal of Greece, all teams moved up one seed, with the Montenegrin President's XV taking Greece's place as fourth seed.

Semi-finals
11 April 2015
President XV	0
Slovakia	82
11 April 2015
Montenegro	29
Estonia	27

Final
14 April 2015
Slovakia	31
Montenegro	3
Third place
14 April 2015
President XV	0
Estonia	106

Semi-finals

11 April 2015	President XV	0–82	Slovakia	Bar, Montenegro
	Cards: Bodizar Jonanovic (yellow card) 39' to 49', Nikola Jocic (red card) 65'	Team Sheet	Try: Patrick Polenda (3'), Jan Szkely (7'c), Pavel Kozubik (12'), Nicolas Douezi 2 (21'c, 75'), Martin Mihalik (25'c), Petr Kalina (32'c), Sebastian Nase (46'), Tomas Zelinksky (49'), Daniel Puha (54'), Sam Morgan (65'), Michal Mihalik (67'), Theo Fouillade (69'c), Jan Jung (80'c); Con: Daniel Puha 6	Attendance: 150; Referee: (Malta) Killian O'Brien (Moldova) Anatol Tipa

11 April 2015	Montenegro	29–27	Estonia	Bar, Montenegro
	Try: Dusan Vucicevic (30'c), Aleksandr Milosavijevic (44'), Marko Andric (47'c), Marko Novakovic (74'c); Con: Srdjan Popovic 3 Pen: Srdjan Popovic (24'); Cards: Nikola Vuletic (yellow card) 80' to 80'	Team Sheet	Try: Marten Martinson 2 (8', 20'), Luke Veebel (51'), Kullar Veersalu (54'), Mark Zuhhovitski (58'c); Con: Marten Martinson	Attendance: 250; Referee: (Georgia (country)) Nika Amashukeli (Georgia (country)) Shota Tevzadze

3rd Place Play-Off

14 April 2015	President XV	0–106	Estonia	Bar, Montenegro
	Cards: Vuk Radulj (yellow card) 48' to 58'	Team Sheet	Try: Kimmo Kokemagi (1'); Luke Veebel (3', 14', 27', 50', 80'); Jaan Lorens (9'); Marten Martinson (12'); Mark Zuhhovitski (16'); Kullar Veersalu (20', 25', 53'); Aivar Lohmus (36', 72'); Kristjan Kotkas (42', 61'); Taavi Ermel (46'); Andre Astre (63'); Con: Kullar Veersalu 4 Marten Martinson 4	Referee: (Malta) Killian O'Brien

Final

14 April 2015	Montenegro	3–31	Slovakia	Bar, Montenegro
		Team Sheet		Referee: (Georgia (country)) Shota Tevzadze

== 2015–16 ==
=== Finals ===
Semi-finals
18 May 2016
Slovakia	29
Belarus	17
18 May 2016
Estonia	16
Montenegro	13

Final
21 May 2016
Slovakia	29
Estonia	36
Third place
21 May 2016
Belarus	19
Montenegro	45

Semi-finals

18 May 2016	Slovakia	29–17	Belarus
16:00		Team Sheet		Attendance: 20

18 May 2016	Estonia	16–13	Montenegro
18:30		Team Sheet

3rd Place Play-Off

21 May 2016	Belarus	19–45	Montenegro
12:00		Team Sheet		Attendance: 50

Final

21 May 2016	Slovakia	29–36	Estonia
15:00		Team Sheet		Attendance: 200

== See also ==
- European Nations Cup
- 2014–16 European Nations Cup First Division
- 2014–16 European Nations Cup Second Division
