= Rugby union in Cyprus =

- Slovakia playing Cyprus
- Country: Cyprus
- National team: Cyprus

National competitions
- Rugby World Cup; European Nations Cup; Rugby World Cup Sevens; IRB Sevens World Series

Audience records
- Single match: ? (?). ? vs ? (?, ?)

Rugby union in Cyprus is a minor but growing sport.

== Governing body ==
The governing body is the Cyprus Rugby Federation

It became affiliated to FIRA in 2006.

== History ==
Cypriot rugby goes back to at least the 1950s, when it was played by British Armed Forces there. The British military still contributes teams from the Akrotiri and Dhekelia bases.

During the 1970s, rugby union in Israel trying to break out of its isolation - both political and geographical - reached out to teams in Cyprus. Many of the teams Israelis played with were British military.

In more recent times, it has mainly been a game played by expatriates.

There are several competitions including a league with teams from the British military bases and three local teams:

- Paphos Tigers - founded by British and South Africans.
- Limassol Crusaders - Founded by expats after England won in the rugby World Cup
- Nicosia Barbarians - The Barbarians are currently not playing, although the website is still up.

Cypriot rugby's main ties are to European rugby, although it does play Israel occasionally.

The situation in Northern Cyprus is somewhat different, with teams playing in the Turkish leagues. Rugby is not a major sport amongst Greek Cypriots, but it is even less so amongst Turkish Cypriots.

=== Introduction of rugby to Cyprus ===
Rugby Football was introduced formally in league format in the early 1980s by the British Military due to the mannerism of their structure. However the first Cypriot Club was formed in 2003 known as, Paphos Tigers. Predominately made up of South African Cypriots they triumphed in the British Military Major Units League. The first game for Cyprus took place on 24 March 2007 at home against Greece. The Cypriot XV won 39-3. Cyprus continued their great start in international rugby by beating Azerbaijan 29-0 at the Pafiako Stadium in Paphos on 28 October 2007. They then put in back-to-back victories against Monaco on 31 October 2007 (19-10) and Slovakia on 3 November 2007 (38-8). Having won the FIRA ENC Division 3D Tournament, they qualified for a promotion playoff against Israel. The game took place on 6 September 2008, Cyprus were defeated 23-14 and therefore remained in ENC 3D with Azerbaijan, Bosnia Herzegovina, Monaco and Slovakia. Cyprus currently hold records over 3 nations in the division ENC 3D, by inflicting the worst defeats of Slovakia, Azerbaijan and Monaco respectively. During the 2009 FIRA AER European Sevens Championship, Cyprus Sevens Team took part in two tournaments in Athens and Split. Their performances during these competitions led to them jumping 11 places in the FIRA rankings and are currently ranked 12th in Europe.

== National team ==
The first international game of the Cyprus Rugby National Team took place on March 24, 2007 against Greece in Paphos. The Cypriot XV won the game by 39-3 in front of 2,500 fans.

In October and November 2007, Cyprus beat Azerbaijan, Monaco, Slovakia to win the FIRA 3D Tournament, a great achievement in their first year on the international scene. However, they lost the play-off game for promotion to level 3C on 6 September 2008 against Israel (which plays in the European leagues) by a score of 23-14.

Cyprus now play in the 2B level, after winning promotion consecutively from the 2008-2010 edition onwards.

== See also ==
- Cyprus national rugby union team
