= 2019–20 Rugby Europe International Championships =

- Date: September 2019 – May 29, 2021
- Countries: 36

Tournament statistics
- Champions: Championship; Georgia (12); Trophy; Netherlands (1)
- Antim Cup: Georgia (13th title)
- Matches played: 26
- Attendance: 18,312 (704 per match)
- Tries scored: 158 (6.08 per match)
- Top point scorer(s): Championship (Portugal) Dany Antunes (45); Trophy (Netherlands) David Weersma (34); Conference (Bulgaria) Petar Nikolov (43)
- Top try scorer(s): Championship (Georgia (country)) Aka Tabutsadze (5); Trophy (Netherlands) Joshua Gascoigne (4) (Netherlands) Jordy Hop (4); Conference (Czech Republic) Jan Kučera (4)
- Official website: Rugby Europe

The 2019–20 Rugby Europe International Championships is the European Championship for tier 2 and tier 3 rugby union nations. The 2019–20 season is the third of its new format and structure, where all Levels play on a one-year cycle, replacing the old format of a two-year cycle, with the teams playing each other both home and away.

After their win against Germany in the relegation play-off of the 2019 Championship season, Portugal was promoted to the Championship for 2020.

On 12 March 2020, as a result of the COVID-19 pandemic, Rugby Europe announced a suspension of all its matches and tournaments from 13 March 2020 until 15 April 2020. On 26 March, Rugby Europe decided to extend the suspension of all its matches and tournaments indefinitely. On 8 April, Rugby Europe Board of Directors decided to call off the season of Men's Senior XV Conference 1, Conference 2 and Development. There will be no promotion or relegation this year. The same pools will be kept for the 2020–21 season. On 20 October 2020, following the resurgence of COVID-19 pandemic across Europe and local authority restrictions, Rugby Europe has announced a suspension of all matches planned until the end of November 2020.

== Countries ==
Pre-tournament World Rugby rankings in parentheses. Conference as of 16 September 2019. Trophy as of 21 October 2019. After winning the relegation play-off between the winner of the 2019 Trophy, Portugal, and the last placed 2019 Championship team, Germany, and the win by the former Germany were relegated to the Trophy level, whereas Portugal was promoted to the Championship. Following the 2018–19 season and the promotion of Turkey as well as the relegation of Slovakia, Rugby Europe no changes to the reallocated groups were made, after last year's switch by Austria from Conference 2 South to Conference 2 North for the 2018–19 Conference season.

Championship

- Belgium (27)
- Georgia * (12)
- Portugal ↑ (21)
- Romania (19)
- Russia (20)
- Spain (18)

Conference 1
North

- Czech Republic ↓ (38)
- Hungary (68)
- Latvia ↑ (57)
- Luxembourg (59)
- Sweden (50)

Conference 2
North

- Austria ‡ (88)
- Denmark (78)
- Finland (90)
- Moldova ↓ (55)
- Norway (95)

Development

- Belarus
- Estonia
- Montenegro
- Slovakia ↓

Trophy

- Germany ↓ (28)
- Lithuania (37)
- Netherlands (25)
- Poland (35)
- Switzerland (30)
- Ukraine ↑ (38)

South

- Croatia (47)
- Cyprus (NR)
- Israel (61)
- Malta • (39)
- Slovenia ↑ (71)

South

- Andorra (76)
- Bosnia and Herzegovina ↓ (73)
- Bulgaria (87)
- Serbia (85)
- Turkey ↑ (NR)

Legend:
* Champion of 2018–19 season; ↑ Promoted from lower division during 2018–19 season; • Division Champion but not promoted during 2018–19 season; ‡ Last place inside own division but not relegated during 2018–19 season; ↓ Relegated from higher division during 2018–19 season

== 2020 Rugby Europe Championship ==
Champions
Advances to promotion/relegation play-off

Place	Nation	Games				Points			Tries			TBP	LBP	GS	Table points
Place	Nation	Played	Won	Drawn	Lost	For	Against	Diff	For	Against	Diff	TBP	LBP	GS	Table points
1	Georgia	5	5	0	0	197	60	+137	28	7	+21	3	0	1	24
2	Spain	5	3	0	2	103	93	+10	14	8	+6	1	0	0	13
3	Romania	5	2	0	3	101	82	+19	7	14	−7	1	1	0	10
4	Portugal	5	2	0	3	98	111	-13	11	14	−3	0	1	0	9
5	Russia	5	2	0	3	82	128	−46	10	15	−5	0	0	0	8
6	Belgium	5	1	0	4	84	171	−87	9	21	−12	1	2	0	7
Source: Points were awarded to the teams as follows: Win – 4 points | Draw – 2 points | At least 3 more tries than opponent – 1 point | Loss within 7 points – 1 point | Loss greater than 7 points – 0 points | Completing a Grand Slam – 1 point

Matches

1 February 2020
15:55 MSK (UTC+03)

Russia	12–31	Spain (1 TBP)
	RE Report

Slava Metreveli Central Stadium, Sochi
Attendance: 8,237
Referee: Andrea Piardi (Italy)

1 February 2020
14:55 WET (UTC+00)

Portugal	23–17	Belgium (1 LBP)
	RE Report

Estádio Universitário de Lisboa, Lisbon
Attendance: 955
Referee: Sam Grove-White (Scotland)

18:00 GET (UTC+04)

(1 TBP) Georgia	41–13	Romania
	RE Report

Boris Paichadze Dinamo Arena, Tbilisi
Attendance: 20,000
Referee: Tom Foley (England)

8 February 2020
15:00 CET (UTC+01)

(1 TBP) Belgium	38–12	Russia
	RE Report

Stade Communal, Woluwe-Saint-Lambert, Brussels
Attendance: 2,500
Referee: Shota Tevzadze (Georgia)

8 February 2020
14:55 WET (UTC+00)

Portugal	22–11	Romania
	RE Report

Estádio Universitário de Lisboa, Lisbon
Attendance: 1,500
Referee: Ludovic Cayre (France)

9 February 2020
12:40 CET (UTC+01)

Spain	10–23	Georgia
	RE Report

Estadio Nacional Complutense, Madrid
Attendance: 8,000
Referee: Craig Evans (Wales)

22 February 2020
14:55 EET (UTC+02)

Romania	24–7	Spain
	RE Report

Stadionul Municipal, Botoşani
Attendance: 1,500
Referee: Nika Amashukeli (Georgia)

22 February 2020
15:00 GET (UTC+04)

1 TBP) Georgia	78–6	Belgium
	RE Report

Aia Arena, Kutaisi
Attendance: 5,000
Referee: Cristian Șerban (Romania)

22 February 2020
16:55 KALT (UTC+02)

Russia	19–18	Portugal (1 LBP)
	RE Report

Kaliningrad
Attendance: 12 000
Referee: Inigo Atorrasagasti (Spain)

7 March 2020
15:00 CET (UTC+01)

(1 LBP) Belgium	23–30	Spain
	RE Report

Stade Communal, Woluwe-Saint-Lambert, Brussels
Attendance: 3,000
Referee: Sean Gallagher (Ireland)

7 March 2020
16:55 MSK (UTC+03)

Russia	32–25	Romania (1 LBP)
	RE Report

Kuban Stadium, Krasnodar
Attendance: 3,100
Referee: Dan Jones (Wales)

7 March 2020
14:55 CET (UTC+01)

Portugal	24–39	Georgia (1 TBP)
	RE Report

Stade Jean-Bouin, Paris
Attendance: 2,000
Referee: Ben Blain (Scotland)

N/A
N/A

Romania	28-0	Belgium

7 February 2021
15:00 GET (UTC+04)

Georgia	16-7	Russia

Mikheil Meskhi Stadium, Tbilisi
Referee: Paulo Duarte (Portugal)

7 February 2021
12:45 CET (UTC+01)

Spain	25-11	Portugal

Estadio Nacional Complutense, Madrid
Referee: Chris Busby (Ireland)

== 2019–20 Rugby Europe Trophy ==
Champions and advances to
Promotion/relegation play-off

Pos.	Team	Games				Points			Tries			Table points
Pos.	Team	Played	Won	Drawn	Lost	For	Against	Diff	For	Against	Diff	Table points
1	Netherlands (25)	5	4	1	0	144	38	+106	3	0	0	21
2	Switzerland (30)	5	2	2	1	93	52	+41	1	1	0	14
3	Ukraine (38)	5	2	2	1	60	74	−19	2	0	0	14
4	Germany (28)	5	1	2	2	62	85	−23	0	0	0	8
5	Lithuania (37)	5	1	1	3	61	103	−42	1	0	0	7
6	Poland (35)	5	1	0	4	44	112	−68	0	1	0	5
Pre-tournament rankings in parentheses. Points were awarded to the teams as follows: Win – 4 points | Draw – 2 points | Loss – 0 points Match bonus points: Scoring at least 3 more tries than the opponent – 1 point | Losing by 7 points or less – 1 point | Overall bonus point: Completing a Grand Slam (winning all matches) – 1 point

Matches

26 October 2019
16:00 EEST (UTC+03)

(1 TBP) Ukraine	27–10	Lithuania
	Gamesheet

Dynamo Stadium, Kharkiv
Attendance: 500
Referee: Federico Vedovelli (Italy)

2 November 2019
15:00 CET (UTC+01)

Poland	15–35	Germany
	Gamesheet

Stadion ŁKS, Łódź
Attendance: 1,500
Referee: Shota Tezvadze (Georgia)

9 November 2019
14:55 CET (UTC+01)

(1 TBP) Netherlands	64–8	Ukraine
	Gamesheet

NRCA Stadium, Amsterdam
Referee: Jonathan Dufort (France)

16 November 2019
16:00 EET (UTC+02)

Lithuania	9–40	Switzerland (1 TBP)
	Gamesheet

Savivaldybė Stadium, Šiauliai
Attendance: 1,000
Referee: Ross Mabon (Scotland)

23 November 2019
15:00 CET (UTC+01)

(1 LBP) Switzerland	20–23	Poland
	Gamesheet

Stade Municipal, Yverdon-les-Bains
Attendance: 1,500
Referee: Robert O'Sullivan (Ireland)

23 November 2019
15:00 CET (UTC+01)

Germany	7–37	Netherlands (1 TBP)
	Gamesheet

Fritz-Grunebaum-Sportpark, Heidelberg
Attendance: 2,731
Referee: Inigo Atorrasagasti (Spain)

29 February 2020
15:00 CET (UTC+01)

Germany	20–33	Switzerland
	Gamesheet

Fritz-Grunebaum-Sportpark, Heidelberg
Attendance: 650
Referee: Saba Abulashvili (Georgia)

29 February 2020
15:00 CET (UTC+01)

Netherlands	7–6	Poland (1 LBP)
	Gamesheet

NRCA Stadium, Amsterdam
Attendance: 2,050
Referee: Killian O'Brian (Germany)

7 March 2020
14:55 CET (UTC+01)

Netherlands	36–17	Lithuania
	Gamesheet

NRCA Stadium, Amsterdam
Attendance: 2,000
Referee: Joao Costa (Portugal)

N/A
N/A

Switzerland	0–0	Netherlands

N/A
N/A

Germany	0–0	Lithuania

N/A
N/A

(1 TBP) Lithuania	25–0	Poland

N/A
N/A

Poland	0–25	Ukraine (1 TBP)

N/A
N/A

Ukraine	0–0	Switzerland

N/A
N/A

Ukraine	0–0	Germany

== 2019–20 Rugby Europe Conference ==
=== Conference 1 ===
==== Conference 1 North ====
Pos.	Team	Games				Points			Tries			Table points
Pos.	Team	Played	Won	Drawn	Lost	For	Against	Diff	For	Against	Diff	Table points
1	Czech Republic	2	2	0	0	100	7	+93	2	0	0	10
2	Hungary	2	1	0	1	38	77	−39	1	0	0	5
3	Luxembourg	2	1	0	1	20	36	−16	0	0	0	4
4	Sweden	2	1	0	1	26	35	−9	0	0	0	4
5	Latvia	2	0	0	2	35	64	−29	0	1	0	1
Points were awarded to the teams as follows: Win – 4 points : Draw – 2 points : Loss within seven points – 1 point : Loss greater than seven points – 0 points: At least three more tries than opponent – 1 point Completing a Grand Slam – 1 point

Matches

21 September 2019
14:30 CEST (UTC+02)

(1 TBP) Czech Republic	64–0	Hungary
	Gamesheet

Stadion ragby Císařka, Prague
Attendance: 1,000
Referee: Killian O'Brien (Germany)

12 October 2019
15:00 CEST (UTC+02)

(1 TBP) Hungary	38–13	Latvia
	Gamesheet

Kincsem Park, Budapest
Attendance: 1,000
Referee: Gert Visser (Netherlands)

19 October 2019
15:00 CEST (UTC+02)

Luxembourg	7–36	Czech Republic (1 TBP)
	Gamesheet

Stade Josy Barthel, Luxembourg City
Attendance: 700
Referee: John Catteau (Belgium)

26 October 2019
16:00 EEST (UTC+03)

(1 LBP) Latvia	22–26	Sweden
	Gamesheet

Slokas Stadium, Jūrmala
Attendance: 350
Referee: Alexandru Ionescu (Romania)

2 November 2019
15:00 CET (UTC+01)

Sweden	0–13	Luxembourg
	Gamesheet

Malmö Stadion, Malmö
Attendance: 200
Referee: Artur Kaptyukh (Russia)

18 April 2020

Czech Republic	Cancelled	Latvia

Prague

2 May 2020

Latvia	Cancelled	Luxembourg

9 May 2020

Sweden	Cancelled	Czech Republic

Norrköping

11 May 2019

Luxembourg	Cancelled	Hungary

Stade Josy Barthel, Luxembourg City

16 May 2019

Hungary	Cancelled	Sweden

==== Conference 1 South ====
Pos.	Team	Games				Points			Tries			Table points
Pos.	Team	Played	Won	Drawn	Lost	For	Against	Diff	For	Against	Diff	Table points
1	Croatia	2	2	0	0	64	30	+34	1	0	0	9
2	Malta	2	1	0	1	58	32	+26	1	1	0	6
3	Cyprus	2	1	0	1	38	41	−3	0	1	0	5
4	Slovenia	2	0	1	1	42	70	−28	0	0	0	2
5	Israel	2	0	1	1	38	67	−29	0	0	0	2
Points were awarded to the teams as follows: Win – 4 points : Draw – 2 points : Loss within seven points – 1 point : Loss greater than seven points – 0 points: At least three more tries than opponent – 1 point Completing a Grand Slam – 1 point

Matches

12 October 2019
15:00 CEST (UTC+02)

(1 TBP) Croatia	39–10	Israel
	Gamesheet

Stadion NŠC Stjepan Spajić, Zagreb
Attendance: 300
Referee: Mike English (Wales)

19 October 2019
16:00 EEST (UTC+03)

(1 LBP) Cyprus	20–25	Croatia
	Gamesheet

Stelios Kyriakides Stadium, Paphos
Attendance: 500
Referee: Matej Razga (Czech Republic)

19 October 2019
15:00 CEST (UTC+02)

Slovenia	28–28	Israel
	Gamesheet

Stanežiče Oval, Ljubljana
Attendance: 250
Referee: Anthony Lac (Monaco)

9 November 2019
15:00 CET (UTC+01)

Slovenia	14–42	Malta (1 TBP)
	Gamesheet

Stanežiče Oval, Ljubljana
Attendance: 150
Referee: Alexei Lebedev (Russia)

23 November 2019
13:55 CET (UTC+01)

(1 LBP) Malta	16–18	Cyprus
	Gamesheet

Hibernians Stadium, Paola
Attendance: 2,000
Referee: Ethan Glass (Switzerland)

21 March 2020

Malta	Cancelled	Israel

Hibernians Stadium, Paola

28 March 2020

Croatia	Cancelled	Slovenia

28 March 2020

Israel	Cancelled	Cyprus

Wingate Institute, Netanya

4 April 2020

Croatia	Cancelled	Malta

25 April 2020

Cyprus	Cancelled	Slovenia

Stelios Kyriakides Stadium, Paphos

=== Conference 2 ===
==== Conference 2 North ====
Pos.	Team	Games				Points			Tries			Table points
Pos.	Team	Played	Won	Drawn	Lost	For	Against	Diff	For	Against	Diff	Table points
1	Denmark	2	2	0	0	66	3	+63	2	0	0	10
2	Moldova	2	1	0	1	64	32	+32	1	1	0	6
3	Austria	2	1	0	1	50	58	−8	1	0	0	5
4	Finland	2	1	0	1	20	37	−17	0	0	0	4
5	Norway	2	0	0	2	12	82	−70	0	0	0	0
Points were awarded to the teams as follows: Win – 4 points : Draw – 2 points : Loss within seven points – 1 point : Loss greater than seven points – 0 points: At least three more tries than opponent – 1 point Completing a Grand Slam – 1 point

Matches

12 October 2019
13:55 CEST (UTC+02)

Norway	3–44	Denmark (1 TBP)
	Gamesheet

Lade idrettsanlegg, Trondheim
Attendance: 200
Referee: Benjamin Loader (Austria)

12 October 2019
15:00 EEST (UTC+03)

Finland	20–15	Moldova (1 LBP)
	Gamesheet

Myllypuron urheilupuisto, Helsinki
Attendance: 100
Referee: Mike Hawkins (Denmark)

26 October 2019
15:00 CEST (UTC+02)

(1 TBP) Denmark	22–0	Finland
	Gamesheet

Odense Athletics Stadium, Odense
Attendance: 500
Referee: Vaidotas Girdvainis (Lithuania)

2 November 2019
14:55 CET (UTC+01)

(1 TBP) Austria	38–9	Norway
	Gamesheet

Sportklub Stadium, Vienna
Referee: Ariel Cabral (Israel)

16 November 2019
16:00 EET (UTC+02)

(1 TBP) Moldova	49 – 12	Austria
	Gamesheet

Stadionul Central, Criuleni
Attendance: 250
Referee: Rami Aro (Sweden)

11 April 2020

Moldova	Cancelled	Norway

9 May 2020

Denmark	Cancelled	Moldova

16 May 2020

Norway	Cancelled	Finland

23 May 2020

Austria	Cancelled	Denmark

30 May 2020

Finland	Cancelled	Austria

Myllypuron urheilupuisto, Helsinki

==== Conference 2 South ====
Pos.	Team	Games				Points			Tries			Table points
Pos.	Team	Played	Won	Drawn	Lost	For	Against	Diff	For	Against	Diff	Table points
1	Bulgaria	2	2	0	0	122	10	+112	2	0	0	10
2	Turkey	2	1	0	1	51	42	+9	1	0	0	5
3	Andorra	2	1	0	1	57	46	+11	1	0	0	5
4	Serbia	2	1	0	1	37	86	−49	0	0	0	4
5	Bosnia and Herzegovina	2	0	0	2	13	96	−83	0	0	0	0
Points were awarded to the teams as follows: Win – 4 points : Draw – 2 points : Loss within seven points – 1 point : Loss greater than seven points – 0 points: At least three more tries than opponent – 1 point Completing a Grand Slam – 1 point

Matches

12 October 2019
16:00 TRT (UTC+03)

(1 TBP) Turkey	36–12	Andorra
	Gamesheet

Kızılcahamam İlçe Stadyumu, Ankara
Attendance: 200
Referee: Dejan Stiglic (Serbia)

12 October 2019
15:00 CEST (UTC+02)

(1 TBP) Bulgaria	71–7	Serbia
	Gamesheet

National Sports Academy "Vasil Levski", Sofia
Attendance: 501
Referee: Maksiuk Valerii (Ukraine)

19 October 2019
13:55 CEST (UTC+02)

Serbia	30–15	Turkey
	Gamesheet

King Peter I Stadium, Belgrade
Attendance: 215
Referee: Norbert Mátrai (Hungary)

26 October 2019
13:55 CEST (UTC+02)

Bosnia and Herzegovina	3–51	Bulgaria (1 TBP)
	Gamesheet

Stadion Kamberovića polje, Zenica
Attendance: 200
Referee: Hrvoje Bartolic (Croatia)

9 November 2019
16:55 CET (UTC+01)

(1 TBP) Andorra	45–10	Bosnia and Herzegovina
	Gamesheet

Estadi Nacional, Andorra la Vella
Attendance: 400
Referee: Lionel da Silva (Malta)

11 April 2020

Bosnia and Herzegovina	Cancelled	Serbia

Stadion Kamberovića polje, Zenica

18 April 2020

Turkey	Cancelled	Bosnia and Herzegovina

Samsun

2 May 2020

Bulgaria	Cancelled	Turkey

9 May 2020

Serbia	Cancelled	Andorra

King Peter I Stadium, Belgrade

16 May 2020

Andorra	Cancelled	Bulgaria

Estadi Nacional, Andorra la Vella

== 2020 Rugby Europe Development ==
Pos.	Team	Games				Points			Tries			Table points
Pos.	Team	Played	Won	Drawn	Lost	For	Against	Diff	For	Against	Diff	Table points
1	Belarus	0	0	0	0	0	0	0	0	0	0	0
2	Estonia	0	0	0	0	0	0	0	0	0	0	0
3	Montenegro	0	0	0	0	0	0	0	0	0	0	0
4	Slovakia	0	0	0	0	0	0	0	0	0	0	0
Points were awarded to the teams as follows: Win – 4 points : Draw – 2 points : Loss within seven points – 1 point : Loss greater than seven points – 0 points: At least three more tries than opponent – 1 point Completing a Grand Slam – 1 point

Matches

18 April 2020

Estonia	Cancelled	Belarus

18 April 2020

Slovakia	Cancelled	Montenegro

9 May 2020

Montenegro	Cancelled	Estonia

9 May 2020

Belarus	Cancelled	Slovakia

31 May 2020

Estonia	Cancelled	Slovakia

31 May 2020

Belarus	Cancelled	Montenegro

== Play-offs ==
=== Championship–Trophy promotion play-off ===
29 May 2021
14:00 CEST (UTC+02)

Belgium	21–23	Netherlands

ASUB Rugby Field, Waterloo
Referee: Andrea Piardi (Italy)

=== Trophy–Conference 1 promotion play-off ===
Cancelled
