= 2016–17 Rugby Europe International Championships =

- Date: September 2016 – May 2017
- Countries: 35

Tournament statistics
- Champions: Championship; Romania (5); Trophy; Portugal (1); Conference 1 Czech Republic (2); Malta (1); Conference 2 Hungary (1); Bosnia and Herzegovina (1); Development; Slovakia (1)
- Antim Cup: Romania (6th title)
- Matches played: 69
- Attendance: 177,923 (2,579 per match)
- Tries scored: 427 (6.19 per match)
- Top point scorer(s): Championship (Spain) Bradley Linklater (51); Trophy (Netherlands) David Weersma (52); Conference (Israel) Ori Abutbul (60); Development (Bulgaria) Petar Nikolov (31)
- Top try scorer(s): Championship (Georgia (country)) Giorgi Koshadze (4) (Georgia (country)) Giorgi Tkhilaishvili (4); Trophy (Netherlands) Sep Visser (6); Conference (Malta) James Kirk (7); Development (Montenegro) Dusan Vucicevic (4)
- Official website: Rugby Europe

The 2016–17 Rugby Europe International Championships is the European Championship for tier 2 and tier 3 rugby union nations. The 2016–17 season is the first of its new format and structure, where all Levels play on a one-year cycle, replacing the old format of a two-year cycle, where the teams played each other both home and away.

For all teams competing, except the Development league, this year's edition of the Rugby Europe International Championships doubles as the 2019 Rugby World Cup qualifiers for the European region, where the winner of the Championship, excluding Georgia, automatically qualifies to the tournament as Europe 1. All other teams remains in contention, playing in their respective leagues, but also playing in World Cup play-offs, for the right to play in the Europe/Oceania play-off against Oceania 3.

== Countries ==
Pre-tournament World Rugby rankings (from November 28 for Championship, from August 29 for all other levels) in parentheses

Championship

- Belgium (26)
- Georgia (12)
- Germany (24)
- Romania (16)
- Russia (19)
- Spain (22)

Conference 1
North

- Czech Republic (33)
- Latvia (51)
- Lithuania (46)
- Luxembourg (59)
- Sweden (58)

South

- Andorra (62)
- Croatia (54)
- Cyprus (NA)
- Israel (63)
- Malta (49)

Development

- Bulgaria (96)
- Montenegro (NA)
- Slovakia (NA)

Trophy

- Moldova (32)
- Netherlands (34)
- Poland (37)
- Portugal (30)
- Switzerland (31)
- Ukraine (27)

Conference 2
North

- Denmark (88)
- Estonia (NA)
- Finland (97)
- Hungary (82)
- Norway (90)

South

- Austria (87)
- Bosnia and Herzegovina (74)
- Serbia (79)
- Slovenia (67)
- ~~Turkey (NA)~~^{a}

Notes

^a Due to financial instability, Turkey has cancelled all matches for the 2016–17 season and is no longer part of World Cup Qualifying.

== 2017 Rugby Europe Championship ==
Champions
Advances Promotion/
Relegation play-off

Pos.	Team	Games				Points			TBP	LBP	GS	Table points
Pos.	Team	Played	Won	Drawn	Lost	For	Against	Diff	TBP	LBP	GS	Table points
1	Romania	5	4	0	1	122	78	+44	2	1	0	19
2	Georgia	5	4	0	1	136	44	+92	2	1	0	19
3	Spain	5	3	0	2	91	54	+37	1	0	0	13
4	Russia	5	2	0	3	107	117	−10	1	0	0	9
5	Germany	5	2	0	3	121	201	−80	0	0	0	8
6	Belgium	5	0	0	5	70	153	−83	0	2	0	2
Points were awarded to the teams as follows: Win – 4 points : Draw – 2 points : Loss within 7 points – 1 point : Loss greater than 7 points – 0 points: At least 3 more tries than opponent- 1 point Completing a Grand Slam – 1 point (will not be counted towards World Cup Qualification); As the tournament for 2017 had been completed and issues of relegation had been decided in that year, the points deduction should not be applied to the 2017 Rugby Europe tournament (para 51).

Matches

11 February 2017
13:15 CET (UTC+01)

Germany	41–38	Romania (1 LBP)
	Gamesheet

Sparda Bank Hessen Stadium, Offenbach
Attendance: 3,000
Referee: (France) Maxime Chalon

11 February 2017
15:00 CET (UTC+01)

Belgium	6–31	Georgia (1 TBP)
	Gamesheet

King Baudouin Stadium- Annex 2, Brussels
Attendance: 4,000
Referee: (Wales) Ben Whitehouse

11 February 2017
16:00 CET (UTC+01)

Spain	16–6	Russia
	Gamesheet

Estadio Nacional Complutense, Madrid
Attendance: 8,000
Referee: (Ireland) Dudley Phillips

18 February 2017
13:00 EET (UTC+02)

Romania	13–3	Spain
	Gamesheet

Stadionul Arcul de Triumf, Bucharest
Attendance: 3,750
Referee: (Italy) Elia Rizzo

18 February 2017
15:00 CET (UTC+01)

(1 LBP) Belgium	18–25	Russia
	Gamesheet

King Baudouin Stadium- Annex 2, Brussels
Attendance: 2,500
Referee: (France) Salem Attalah

19 February 2017
15:00 GET (UTC+04)

(1 TBP) Georgia	50–6	Germany
	Gamesheet

Rustavi Rugby Stadium, Rustavi
Attendance: 3,300
Referee: (Belgium) Max Burlet

4 March 2017
13:00 MSK (UTC+03)

Russia	10–30	Romania (1 TBP)
	Gamesheet

Slava Metreveli Central Stadium, Sochi
Attendance: 2,000
Referee: (Ireland) Sean Gallagher

4 March 2017
16:00 CET (UTC+01)

Spain	10–20	Georgia
	Gamesheet

Estadio Municipal, Medina del Campo
Attendance: 7,000
Referee: (Wales) Craig Evans

4 March 2017
16:15 CET (UTC+01)

Germany	34–29	Belgium (1 LBP)
	Gamesheet

Sparda Bank Hessen Stadium, Offenbach
Attendance: 4,126
Referee: (Spain) Iñigo Atorrasagasti

11 March 2017
14:45 CET (UTC+01)

Belgium	17–33	Romania (1 TBP)
	Gamesheet

King Baudouin Stadium- Annex 2, Brussels
Attendance: 3,000
Referee: (Italy) Claudio Blessano

11 March 2017
16:00 CET (UTC+01)

Germany	15–32	Spain
	Gamesheet

Sportpark Höhenberg, Köln
Attendance: 4,500
Referee: (Scotland) Lloyd Linton

12 March 2017
18:00 GET (UTC+04)

Georgia	28–14	Russia
	Gamesheet

Dinamo Arena, Tbilisi
Attendance: 52,000
Referee: (England) Ian Tempest

19 March 2017
16:00 CET (UTC+01)

(1 TBP) Spain	30–0	Belgium
	Gamesheet

Estadio Nacional Complutense, Madrid
Attendance: 7,800
Referee: (Romania) Vlad Iordăchescu

19 March 2017
14:00 MSK (UTC+03)

(1 TBP) Russia	52–25	Germany
	Gamesheet

Slava Metreveli Central Stadium, Sochi
Attendance: 2,500
Referee: (France) Cedric Marchat

19 March 2017
15:00 EET (UTC+02)

Romania	8–7	Georgia (1 LBP)
	Gamesheet

Stadionul Arcul de Triumf, Bucharest
Attendance: 7,500
Referee: (Wales) Ian Davies

== 2016–17 Rugby Europe Trophy ==
Champions and
advances to Promotion/
Relegation play-off
Relegated

Pos.	Team	Games				Points			TBP	LBP	GS	Table points
Pos.	Team	Played	Won	Drawn	Lost	For	Against	Diff	TBP	LBP	GS	Table points
1	Portugal	5	5	0	0	179	37	+142	4	0	1	25
2	Netherlands	5	3	0	2	159	94	+65	2	1	0	15
3	Switzerland	5	3	0	2	140	122	+18	1	0	0	13
4	Poland	5	3	0	2	73	73	0	0	0	0	12
5	Moldova	5	1	0	4	100	162	−62	1	1	0	6
6	Ukraine	5	0	0	5	52	215	−163	0	0	0	0
Points were awarded to the teams as follows: Win – 4 points : Draw – 2 points : Loss within 7 points – 1 point : Loss greater than 7 points – 0 points: At least 3 more tries than opponent- 1 point Completing a Grand Slam – 1 point (will not be counted towards World Cup Qualification)

Matches

24 September 2016
19:30 CEST (UTC+02)

Poland	22–0	Ukraine
	Gamesheet

Arena Lublin, Lublin
Attendance: 2,500
Referee: (Wales) Daniel Jones

5 November 2016
14:00 EET (UTC+02)

Ukraine	12–54	Netherlands (1 TBP)
	Gamesheet

Yunist' Stadium, Lviv
Attendance: 1,000
Referee: (Portugal) Paulo Duarte

12 November 2016
13:10 EET (UTC+02)

(1 TBP) Moldova	54–15	Ukraine
	Gamesheet

Stadionul Orășenesc, Bălți
Attendance: 500
Referee: (France) Cardona Laurent

19 November 2016
15:00 CET (UTC+01)

(1 TBP) Netherlands	44–17	Moldova
	Gamesheet

NRCA Stadium, Amsterdam
Attendance: 3,215
Referee: (Scotland) Sam Grove-White

19 November 2016
15:00 CET (UTC+01)

Switzerland	10–28	Portugal
	Gamesheet

Stade Municipal, Yverdon-les-Bains
Attendance: 2,057
Referee: (Italy) Tomo Emanuele

26 November 2016
15:00 CET (UTC+01)

Switzerland	29–26	Moldova (1 LBP)
	Gamesheet

Stade Municipal, Yverdon-les-Bains
Attendance: 1,030
Referee: (Germany) Frank Himmer

18 February 2017
15:00 WET (UTC+00)

(1 TBP) Portugal	35–10	Poland
	Gamesheet

CAR Rugby do Jamor, Oeiras
Attendance: 2,000
Referee: (Scotland) Sam Grove-White

4 March 2017
15:00 CET (UTC+01)

Netherlands	10–26	Portugal (1 TBP)
	Gamesheet

NRCA Stadium, Amsterdam
Attendance: 3,500
Referee: (Italy) Guiseppe Vivarini

11 March 2017
15:00 WET (UTC+00)

(1 TBP) Portugal	59–0	Moldova
	Gamesheet

CAR Rugby do Jamor, Oeiras
Attendance: 1,400
Referee: (Ireland) Stuart Graffkin

12 March 2017
15:00 CET (UTC+01)

(1 TBP) Switzerland	54–18	Ukraine
	Gamesheet

CS Sportif des Charpines, Plan-les-Ouates
Attendance: 2,000
Referee: (Romania) Radu Petrescu

18 March 2017
13:00 EET (UTC+02)

Moldova	3–15	Poland
	Gamesheet

Stadionul Raional, Anenii Noi
Attendance: 350
Referee: (Russia) Alexey Bryzgalin

18 March 2017
15:00 CET (UTC+01)

Netherlands	38–25	Switzerland
	Gamesheet

NRCA Stadium, Amsterdam
Attendance: 2,000
Referee: (Spain) Iñigo Atorrasagasti

1 April 2017
15:00 EEST (UTC+03)

Ukraine	7–31	Portugal (1 TBP)
	Gamesheet

Spartak Stadium, Odesa
Attendance: 4,000
Referee: (Romania) Vlad Iordăchescu

8 April 2017
18:00 CEST (UTC+02)

Poland	14–13	Netherlands (1 LBP)
	Gamesheet

Stadion Widzewa, Łódź
Attendance: 8,500
Referee: (France) Tual Trainini

22 April 2017
17:00 CEST (UTC+02)

Poland	12–22	Switzerland
	Gamesheet

Stadion Polonii Warszawa, Warsaw
Attendance: n.a.
Referee: (England) Matthew Carley

== 2016–17 Rugby Europe Conference ==
=== Conference 1 ===
==== Conference 1 North ====
Champions and advances to
Promotion play-off
Relegated

Pos.	Team	Games				Points			TBP	LBP	GS	Table points
Pos.	Team	Played	Won	Drawn	Lost	For	Against	Diff	TBP	LBP	GS	Table points
1	Czech Republic	4	4	0	0	158	26	+132	3	0	1	20
2	Lithuania	4	3	0	1	93	45	+48	2	0	0	14
3	Latvia	4	2	0	2	56	98	−42	0	1	0	9
4	Sweden	4	1	0	3	54	124	−70	1	1	0	6
5	Luxembourg	4	0	0	4	39	107	−68	0	1	0	1
Points were awarded to the teams as follows: Win – 4 points : Draw – 2 points : Loss within 7 points – 1 point : Loss greater than 7 points – 0 points: At least 3 more tries than opponent- 1 point Completing a Grand Slam – 1 point (will not be counted towards World Cup Qualification)

Matches

3 September 2016
15:00 CEST (UTC+02)

Sweden	14–56	Czech Republic (1 TBP)
	Gamesheet

Enköpings RK, Enköping
Attendance: 400
Referee: (Belgium) Maxime Burlet

22 October 2016
15:00 EET (UTC+02)

Latvia	31–24	Luxembourg (1 LBP)
	Gamesheet

Zemgale Olympic Center, Jelgava
Attendance: 450
Referee: (Czech Republic) Tomáš Tuma

5 November 2016
14:00 EET (UTC+02)

Lithuania	11–6	Latvia (1 LBP)
	Gamesheet

Savivaldybė Stadium, Šiauliai
Attendance: 500
Referee: (Russia) Artur Kaptyukh

5 November 2016
16:00 CET (UTC+01)

Luxembourg	0–19	Sweden (1 TBP)
	Gamesheet

Stade Josy Barthel, Luxembourg City
Attendance: 1,200
Referee: (Italy) Trentin Luca

12 November 2016
14:00 CET (UTC+01)

Czech Republic	15–6	Lithuania
	Gamesheet

RC Tatra Smíchov, Prague
Attendance: 1,500
Referee: (Georgia (country)) Nika Amashukelli

15 April 2017
14:00 CEST (UTC+02)

(1 TBP) Czech Republic	54–3	Latvia
	Gamesheet

Stadion Markéta, Prague
Attendance: 1,000
Referee: (Italy) Gabriel Chirnoaga

22 April 2017
15:00 EEST (UTC+03)

Lithuania	24–12	Luxembourg
	Gamesheet

Aukštaitija Stadium, Panevėžys
Attendance: 450
Referee: (Denmark) Michael Hawkins

29 April 2017
15:00 EEST (UTC+03)

Latvia	16–9	Sweden (1 LBP)
	Gamesheet

Jāņa Daliņa stadions, Valmiera
Attendance: 500
Referee: (Scotland) Sam Grove-White

6 May 2017
16:00 CEST (UTC+02)

Sweden	12–52	Lithuania (1 TBP)
	Gamesheet

Enköpings RK, Enköping
Attendance: 320
Referee: (Germany) Killian O'Brien

6 May 2017
16:00 CEST (UTC+02)

Luxembourg	3–33	Czech Republic (1 TBP)
	Gamesheet

Stade Josy Barthel, Luxembourg City
Attendance: 1,200
Referee: (England) Craig Maxwell Keys

==== Conference 1 South ====
Champions and advances to
Promotion play-off
Relegated

Pos.	Team	Games				Points			TBP	LBP	GS	Table points
Pos.	Team	Played	Won	Drawn	Lost	For	Against	Diff	TBP	LBP	GS	Table points
1	Malta	4	3	1	0	147	49	+98	3	0	0	17
2	Israel	4	3	0	1	135	100	+35	2	0	0	14
3	Croatia	4	2	1	1	106	79	+27	1	1	0	12
4	Andorra	4	1	0	3	62	181	−119	0	0	0	4
5	Cyprus	4	0	0	4	72	113	−41	0	2	0	2
Points were awarded to the teams as follows: Win – 4 points : Draw – 2 points : Loss within 7 points – 1 point : Loss greater than 7 points – 0 points: At least 3 more tries than opponent- 1 point Completing a Grand Slam – 1 point (will not be counted towards World Cup Qualification)

Matches

22 October 2016
18:00 CEST (UTC+02)

Andorra	15–63	Malta (1 TBP)
	Gamesheet

Estadi Nacional, Andorra La Vella
Attendance: 400
Referee: (Italy) Riccardo Angelucci

29 October 2016
14:00 CET (UTC+01)

(1 TBP) Malta	31–3	Cyprus
	Gamesheet

Hibernians Stadium, Paola
Attendance: 1,500
Referee: (Israel) Ariel Cabral

29 October 2016
16:00 CET (UTC+01)

(1 TBP) Croatia	47–15	Andorra
	Gamesheet

Stari Plac Stadion, Split
Attendance: 1,000
Referee: (Romania) Ionuț Bodea

5 November 2016
14:00 IST (UTC+02)

Israel	23–16	Croatia (1 LBP)
	Gamesheet

Wingate Institute, Netanya
Attendance: 1,700
Referee: (Belgium) John Catteau

12 November 2016
14:30 EET (UTC+02)

Cyprus	28–38	Israel (1 TBP)
	Gamesheet

Stelios Kyriakides Stadium, Paphos
Attendance: 500
Referee: (Czech Republic) Matéj Rázga

11 February 2017
18:00 CET (UTC+01)

Andorra	15–14	Cyprus (1 LBP)
	Gamesheet

Estadi Nacional, Andorra La Vella
Attendance: 1,000
Referee: (Belgium) Philippe Lenne

8 April 2017
15:00 IDT (UTC+03)

(1 TBP) Israel	57–17	Andorra
	Gamesheet

Wingate Institute, Netanya
Attendance: 700
Referee: (Switzerland) Yann Benoit

22 April 2017
14:00 CEST (UTC+02)

(1 TBP) Malta	39–17	Israel
	Gamesheet

Hibernians Stadium, Paola
Attendance: 1,500
Referee: (France) Pierre Brousset

29 April 2017
14:00 CEST (UTC+02)

Croatia	14–14	Malta
	Gamesheet

Stadion NŠC Stjepan Spajić, Zagreb
Attendance: 1,500
Referee: (Spain) Jorge Molpeces

6 May 2017
15:00 EEST (UTC+03)

(1 LBP) Cyprus	27–29	Croatia
	Gamesheet

Stelios Kyriakides Stadium, Paphos
Attendance: 500
Referee: (Ireland) Nigel Correll

=== Conference 2 ===
==== Conference 2 North ====
Champions and Promoted

Pos.	Team	Games				Points			TBP	LBP	GS	Table points
Pos.	Team	Played	Won	Drawn	Lost	For	Against	Diff	TBP	LBP	GS	Table points
1	Hungary	4	4	0	0	157	30	+127	3	0	1	20
2	Denmark	4	3	0	1	161	42	+119	3	0	0	15
3	Norway	4	2	0	2	98	109	−11	1	0	0	9
4	Finland	4	1	0	3	92	144	−52	1	0	0	5
5	Estonia	4	0	0	4	39	222	−183	0	0	0	0
Points were awarded to the teams as follows: Win – 4 points : Draw – 2 points : Loss within 7 points – 1 point : Loss greater than 7 points – 0 points: At least 3 more tries than opponent- 1 point Completing a Grand Slam – 1 point (will not be counted towards World Cup Qualification)

Matches

1 October 2016
14:00 EEST (UTC+03)

Estonia	5–35	Hungary (1 TBP)
	Gamesheet

Kalevi Keskstaadion, Tallinn
Attendance: 200
Referee: (Russia) George Kopp

8 October 2016
14:00 CEST (UTC+02)

Norway	48–31	Finland
	Gamesheet

Bislett Stadium, Oslo
Attendance: 500
Referee: (Portugal) Alfoso Nogueria

8 October 2016
15:00 CEST (UTC+02)

Hungary	25–13	Denmark
	Gamesheet

Frankaréna, Esztergom
Attendance: n.a.
Referee: (Croatia) H. Bartoli

22 October 2016
13:00 EEST (UTC+03)

(1 TBP) Finland	51–6	Estonia
	Gamesheet

Myllypuron urheilupuisto, Helsinki
Attendance: 300
Referee: (Lithuania) Ramonas Grumbinas

22 October 2016
16:00 CEST (UTC+02)

(1 TBP) Denmark	20–0	Norway
	Gamesheet

Atletikstadion, Odense
Attendance: 500
Referee: (Germany) Dan Maughan

22 April 2017
16:00 CEST (UTC+02)

(1 TBP) Denmark	53–3	Finland
	Gamesheet

Atletikstadion, Odense
Attendance: 450
Referee: (Poland) Darek Reks

22 April 2017
16:00 CEST (UTC+02)

(1 TBP) Hungary	42–7	Norway
	Gamesheet

Frankaréna, Esztergom
Attendance: 500
Referee: (Poland) Lukasz Jasinski

29 April 2017
14:00 EEST (UTC+03)

Estonia	12–75	Denmark (1 TBP)
	Gamesheet

Kalevi Keskstaadion, Tallinn
Attendance: 50
Referee: (Finland) George Mossford

6 May 2017
13:00 EEST (UTC+03)

Finland	5–37	Hungary (1 TBP)
	Gamesheet

Myllypuron urheilupuisto, Helsinki
Attendance: 400
Referee: (Belgium) Kevin Sulejmani

6 May 2017
14:00 CEST (UTC+02)

(1 TBP) Norway	43–16	Estonia
	Gamesheet

Bislett Stadium, Oslo
Attendance: 500
Referee: (Sweden) Rami Aro

==== Conference 2 South ====
Champions and Promoted
Relegated

Pos.	Team	Games				Points			TBP	LBP	GS	Table points
Pos.	Team	Played	Won	Drawn	Lost	For	Against	Diff	TBP	LBP	GS	Table points
1	Bosnia and Herzegovina	4	3	0	1	90	54	+36	0	1	0	13
2	Austria	4	3	0	1	79	51	+28	0	0	0	12
3	Slovenia	4	2	0	2	114	48	+66	1	1	0	10
4	Serbia	4	2	0	2	77	107	−30	1	0	0	9
5	Turkey	4	0	0	4	0	100	−100	0	0	0	0
Points were awarded to the teams as follows: Win – 4 points : Draw – 2 points : Loss within 7 points – 1 point : Loss greater than 7 points – 0 points: At least 3 more tries than opponent- 1 point Completing a Grand Slam – 1 point (will not be counted towards World Cup Qualification)

Matches

8 October 2016
15:00 CEST (UTC+02)

Austria	29–22	Bosnia and Herzegovina (1 LBP)
	Gamesheet

Wiener Sportclub-Platz, Vienna
Attendance: 700
Referee: (Czech Republic) Stepan Cekal

29 October 2016
14:00 CEST (UTC+02)

(1 TBP) Slovenia	74–13	Serbia
	Gamesheet

Športni Park Šiška, Ljubliana
Attendance: 500
Referee: (Italy) Matteo Liperini

5 November 2016
14:00 CET (UTC+01)

Serbia	cancelled (25–0)	Turkey

12 November 2016
14:00 CET (UTC+01)

Turkey	cancelled (0–25)	Austria

26 November 2016
14:00 CET (UTC+01)

Turkey	cancelled (0–25)	Slovenia

4 March 2017
14:00 CET (UTC+01)

Bosnia and Herzegovina	cancelled (25–0)	Turkey

8 April 2017
14:00 CEST (UTC+02)

(1 LBP) Slovenia	15–22	Bosnia and Herzegovina
	Gamesheet

Športni Park Šiška, Ljubliana
Attendance: 1,000
Referee: (Hungary) Norbert Matrai

22 April 2017
17:00 CEST (UTC+02)

Austria	13–0	Slovenia
	Gamesheet

Wiener Sportclub-Platz, Vienna
Attendance: 800
Referee: (Portugal) Pedro Mendes da Silva

22 April 2017
15:00 CEST (UTC+02)

Bosnia and Herzegovina	21–10	Serbia
	Gamesheet

Stadion Kamberovića polje, Zenica
Attendance: 300
Referee: (Hungary) Csaba Priskin

29 April 2017
14:00 CEST (UTC+02)

(1 TBP) Serbia	29–12	Austria
	Gamesheet

Obrenovački drum, Belgrade
Attendance: 200
Referee: (Georgia (country)) Shota Tevradze

== 2017 Rugby Europe Development ==
Champions and Promoted

Pos.	Team	Games				Points			TBP	LBP	GS	Table points
Pos.	Team	Played	Won	Drawn	Lost	For	Against	Diff	TBP	LBP	GS	Table points
1	Slovakia	2	1	0	1	52	42	+10	0	1	0	5
2	Montenegro	2	1	0	1	62	51	+11	1	0	0	5
3	Bulgaria	2	1	0	1	41	62	+2	0	0	0	4
Points were awarded to the teams as follows: Win – 4 points : Draw – 2 points : Loss within 7 points – 1 point : Loss greater than 7 points – 0 points: At least 3 more tries than opponent- 1 point Completing a Grand Slam – 1 point (will not be counted towards World Cup Qualification)

Matches

14 May 2017
14:00 CEST (UTC+02)

Montenegro	20–32	Slovakia
	Gamesheet

Stadion u Parku, Tivat
Attendance: 150
Referee: (Romania) Cristian Șerban

17 May 2017
14:00 CEST (UTC+02)

Bulgaria	22–20	Slovakia (1 LBP)
	Gamesheet

Stadion u Parku, Tivat
Attendance: 50
Referee: (Ukraine) Aleksander Mihgunov

20 May 2017
14:00 CEST (UTC+02)

(1 TBP) Montenegro	42–19	Bulgaria
	Gamesheet

Stadion u Parku, Tivat
Attendance: 100
Referee: (Romania) Vasiliu Răzvan

== Play-offs ==
=== Championship-Trophy Promotion play-off ===
20 May 2017
16:00 CEST (UTC+02)

Belgium	29–18	Portugal

King Baudouin Stadium – Annex 2, Brussels
Referee: (Ireland) Frank Murphy

=== Conference 1 promotion to Trophy play-off ===
20 May 2017
15:00 CEST (UTC+02)

Czech Republic	48–14	Malta

Stadion Markéta, Prague
Referee: (France) Thomas Charabas

== See also ==
- 2019 Rugby World Cup – Europe qualification
