= Rugby union in Turkey =

- Country: Turkey
- National team: Turkey
- First played: Early 20th century

Club competitions
- Guzelbahce Rugby; İstanbul Ottomans; Metu Rugby; Kadıkoy Rugby; Karadeniz; Hacettepe Rugby; Galatasaray University; Koc University; Trakya University; Kocaeli University; Bosphorus Rugby; Eskisehir Anadolu Genclik; Eskisehir Aqua; Avrasya Rugby

Audience records
- Single match: ? (?). ? vs ? (?, ?)
- Season: Türkiye Ragbi Klüpler Ligi

Rugby union in Turkey is a minor but growing sport.

== Governing body ==
The governing body is the Turkish Rugby Federation. The Federation became the governing body for rugby in 2011 and was accepted to FIRA-AER in July 2012.

== History ==
Some of the earliest rugby games played in Turkey were between ANZACs and British troops serving in the Dardanelles Campaign during World War I. In a letter to Harold Austin, the Manly rugby club secretary, Tom Richards said that rugby was "a splendid break in the irksome routine of military life, which dulls one's wits and brings on a state of general carelessness".

The eight "old" Rugby clubs in Turkey are the Istanbul Ottomans, Metu Rugby, Kadikoy, Girne Pumas, Saint Benoit, Saint Joseph Istanbul, Saint Joseph Izmir, IRC and Koc School. For many years, apart from playing the odd game against a Greek team, or from Northern Cyprus there was little outside contact.

The game is undergoing development by the efforts on senior level of the clubs such as Rugby Union, Metu Rugby previous champion, Istanbul Ottomans, Kadikoy rugby and samsun rugby. Those teams are working hard to encourage the sport to be known, loved, and played nationwide. With the progress and the determination of the clubs, a Turkish national rugby union team is expected to emerge in the near future. A new Rugby Club has also recently been established in the Aegean resort town of Kusadasi and are called the Kusadasi Eagles. The Eagles host a tournament each year in Kusadasi open to Turkish and overseas clubs.

Niall Doherty (Ireland) in the Technical Director and Head Coach for Turkey.

The Pumas were founded in October 2003 and have developed into one of the most respected teams competing in the Turkish league with matches being played against the Istanbul Ottomans, Metu Rugby, Samsun, Kadikoy, Bakirkoy. They have regular test matches with teams from the UN and recently played host to Worcester Rugby Club who enjoyed their tour of Northern Cyprus.

== See also ==
- Turkey national rugby union team
- Turkey women's national rugby union team
