= Rugby union in Andorra =

- Country: Andorra
- Governing body: Andorran Rugby Federation
- National team: Andorra
- First played: 1960s
- Registered players: 213
- Clubs: 2

National competitions
- Rugby World Cup; Rugby World Cup Sevens; IRB Sevens World Series; European Nations Cup

Rugby union in Andorra is considered the second most popular sport in Andorra and has increased in popularity rapidly over the last decade and the national team has had a growing success on the international stage.

In 2010, there were 213 registered players, and 2 clubs.

As of August 2015, there are 192 members of which 22 are women and 172 are seniors, whilst there only being one referee and 15 coaches.

== Governing body ==
The Andorran Rugby Federation was founded in 1986, and became affiliated to the IRFB (as it was then) in 1991.

== History ==
Andorran rugby is around sixty years old, having been introduced in the 1960s.

Because it is surrounded by some of the main rugby playing heartlands of France and Spain - Provence, Catalonia (and Roussillon) and the Basque Country - Andorrans have had a long exposure to the sport through the media.

Also, three other factors have come to have an influence in recent years -

1. A large influx of tourists, especially skiers.
2. Andorra's status as a tax haven has brought with it many tax exiles from rugby playing countries
3. Andorra's small size has meant that young people tend to study outside the country, and become interested in rugby at foreign universities.

Returning students have been a major factor in the growth of Andorran rugby.

One of the most prominent advocates of rugby in Andorra has been the radio personality and teacher, Anick Musolas. Musolas was raised in La Rochelle, in France, and her father was rugby-mad.

Andorra managed to reach the Spanish Cup Final in 1966, but was later kicked out. It now plays in the French fourth division.

Notable Andorra-based players have included the no. 8 Toni Castillo and scrum halves Alonso Ricart and Roger Font, as well as locally based foreign players such as Jimmy Jordan, a Scottish winger from Kilmarnock, and the Argentine fly-half Gustavo Tumosa, who previously played for Rosario.

Andorra's traditional rivals are Luxembourg, who have a similar set up. Andorra was to give Luxembourg their first international victory, 10–6.

== Clubs ==
In 1997, there were only three clubs, one being made up of ski-instructors who were locally based, but who came from all over the world.

The main club in the country is VPC Andorra XV, that currently plays in the lower French leagues.

== See also ==
- Andorra national rugby union team
