= 2014 Rugby Europe Sevens – Division A =

- Hosts: Lithuania
- Date: 14 June 2014 - 15 June 2014
- Nations: 11

Final positions
- Champions: Lithuania
- Runners-up: Poland

Series details
- Matches played: 30

2014 European Sevens Championship Division A is a lower division European Championships, that was held in Kaunas, Lithuania between 14 June and 15 June 2014. The winner of the division will get promoted to elite championships.

== Results ==
=== Group A ===
Team	Pld	W	D	L	PF	PA	PD	Pts
Lithuania	3	3	0	0	69	29	+40	9
Ukraine	2	2	0	1	59	38	+21	7
Latvia	3	1	0	2	15	62	−47	5
Denmark	3	0	0	3	46	60	-14	3

=== Group B ===
Team	Pld	W	D	L	PF	PA	PD	Pts
Poland	3	3	0	0	81	19	+62	9
Lithuania II	2	1	0	1	28	38	-10	4
Moldova	3	0	0	3	31	83	-52	3

=== Group C ===
Team	Pld	W	D	L	PF	PA	PD	Pts
Cyprus	3	3	0	0	70	34	+36	9
Sweden	3	2	0	1	69	19	+40	7
Israel	3	1	0	2	48	59	-11	5
Monaco	3	0	0	3	12	87	−75	3

== Final standings ==
#	Teams
1	Lithuania
2	Poland
3	Cyprus
4	Sweden
5	Ukraine
6	Lithuania II
7	Israel
8	Latvia
9	Denmark
10	Moldova
11	Monaco

- Lithuania got promoted to 2015 Sevens Grand Prix Series.
