= Cyprus national rugby sevens team =

Cyprus
- Union: Cyprus Rugby Federation
- Nickname: Mouflons
- Ground(s): Pafiako Stadium, Paphos
- Captain: Chris Thoma
- Most caps: Georgios Agathokleous
Team kit

Largest win
- Cyprus 80 - 0 Hungary

Largest defeat
- Italy 28 - 0 Cyprus

The Cyprus national rugby sevens team competes in the FIRA-AER European sevens. They have only played for 2 seasons. In their first season of the 2008 competition they managed to compete with the First and Third Tier sevens teams by defeating Georgia 7-5 and drawing 7–7 with Italy. Their second season saw them finish 12th out of 30 teams, just 2 places off qualifying for the final tournament held in Germany. In just their third year of sevens rugby, Cyprus hosted the final stage of the FIRA-AER European Sevens, this was held in Paphos on 12 and 13 June 2010.

== FIRA-AER European Sevens ==
=== 2008-09 Squad ===
10-man squad:

Player	Club
Chris Thoma	Paphos Tigers (c)
George Agathacleous	Paphos Tigers
Daniel Thrasivoulou	Derby Rugby Club
Marcus Holden	RGC 1404
Andreas Zacharia	University of Lincoln
Colm O'Cleirgh	Bective Rangers
Peter Ioulianou	University of Lincoln
Marko Mladenvic	Limassol Crusaders
Luke Peters	North Shore Rugby Football Club
Kyle Oelofse	Paphos Tigers

=== 2010 squad ===
12-man squad: Bucharest and Paphos Sevens

Player	Club
Jonathon Pettemerides (c)	Singapore Rugby Club
Chris Thoma	Paphos Tigers
George Agathacleous	Paphos Tigers
Daniel Thrasivoulou	Derby Rugby Club
Marcus Holden	RGC 1404
Andreas Zacharia	University of Lincoln
Reno Ioannides	Montluçon Rugby
Burhan Torghut	Moseley
Marko Mladenvic	Limassol Crusaders
Fidias Efthymiou	Paphos Tigers
Andrew Binikos	Currie RFC
Dan McFarlane	Paphos Tigers

== Coaches ==
- Mark Walboyoff (head coach)
- Paul Shanks (assistant coach)
- Carlton Douglas
