= Sport in Bratislava =

Various sports and sports teams have a long tradition in Bratislava, with many sport teams and individuals competing in the best Slovak and international leagues and competitions. Many significant sports events have been held in Bratislava, most importantly the 2011 and 2019 Ice Hockey World Championships that Bratislava hosted alongside with Košice.

== Football (soccer) ==
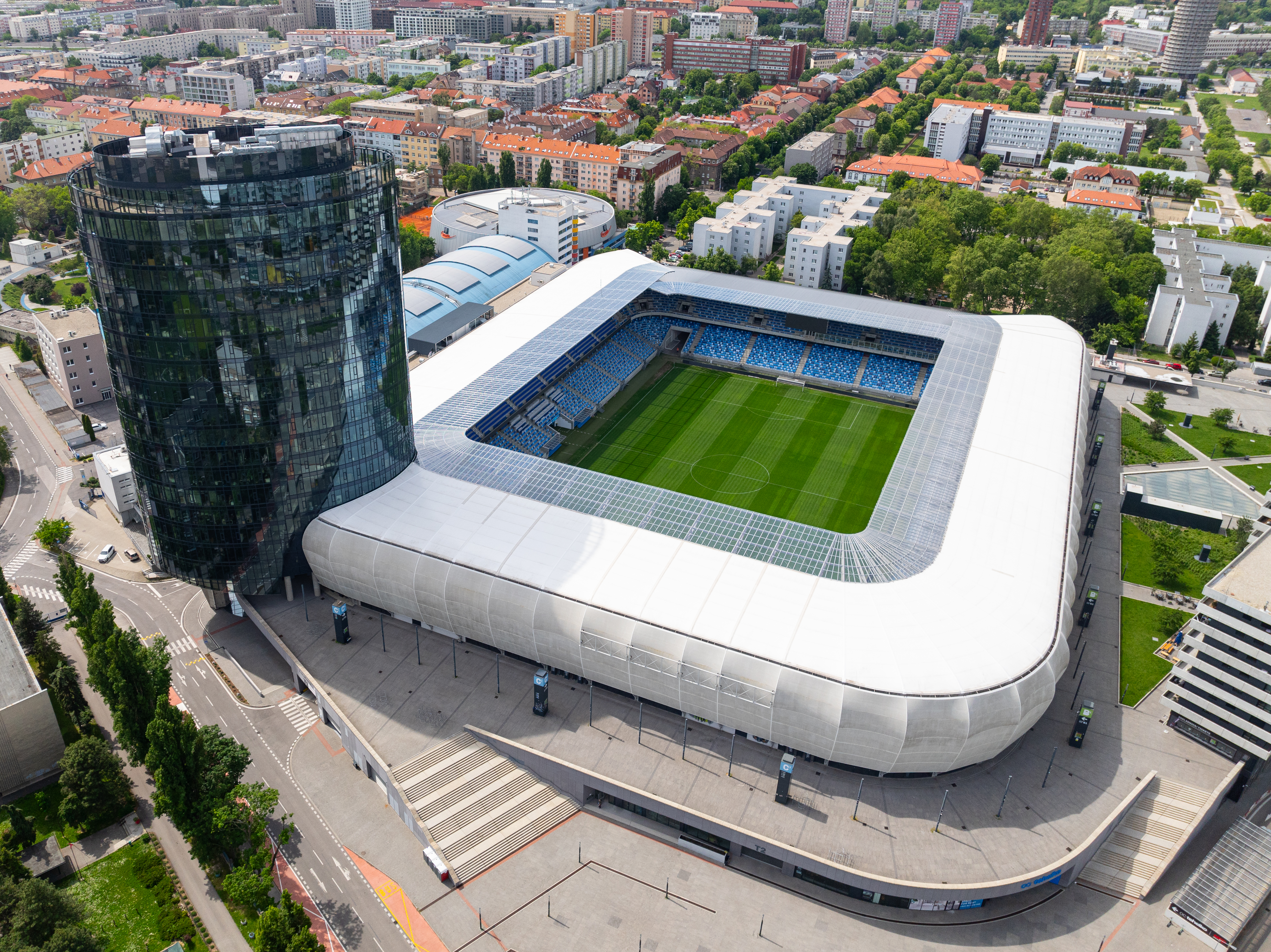
National football stadium

Football (soccer) is currently represented by one club playing the top Slovak football league Niké liga:

- ŠK Slovan Bratislava

ŠK (Športový Klub - Sports Club) Slovan was founded in May 1919 as 1. ČsŠK Bratislava (1. Československý športový klub). Its home ground is the Tehelné pole (Brickfield) stadium with a seating capacity of 22,500. ŠK Slovan is the most successful football club in Slovak history and the only winner of the UEFA Cup Winners' Cup from former Czechoslovakia. It won the cup in the 1968-69 season. ŠK Slovan also won the top Slovak and Czechoslovak football leagues and Slovak Cup and Czechoslovak Cup several times. ŠK Slovan has had the most players in the Slovak national football team in history. Many famous Slovak footballers played in ŠK Slovan, for example Peter Dubovský, Jozef Adamec, Karol Jokl, Jozef Vengloš or Róbert Vittek. The club had 7 players in the Czechoslovak team that won the 1976 European Football Championship.

== Ice hockey ==
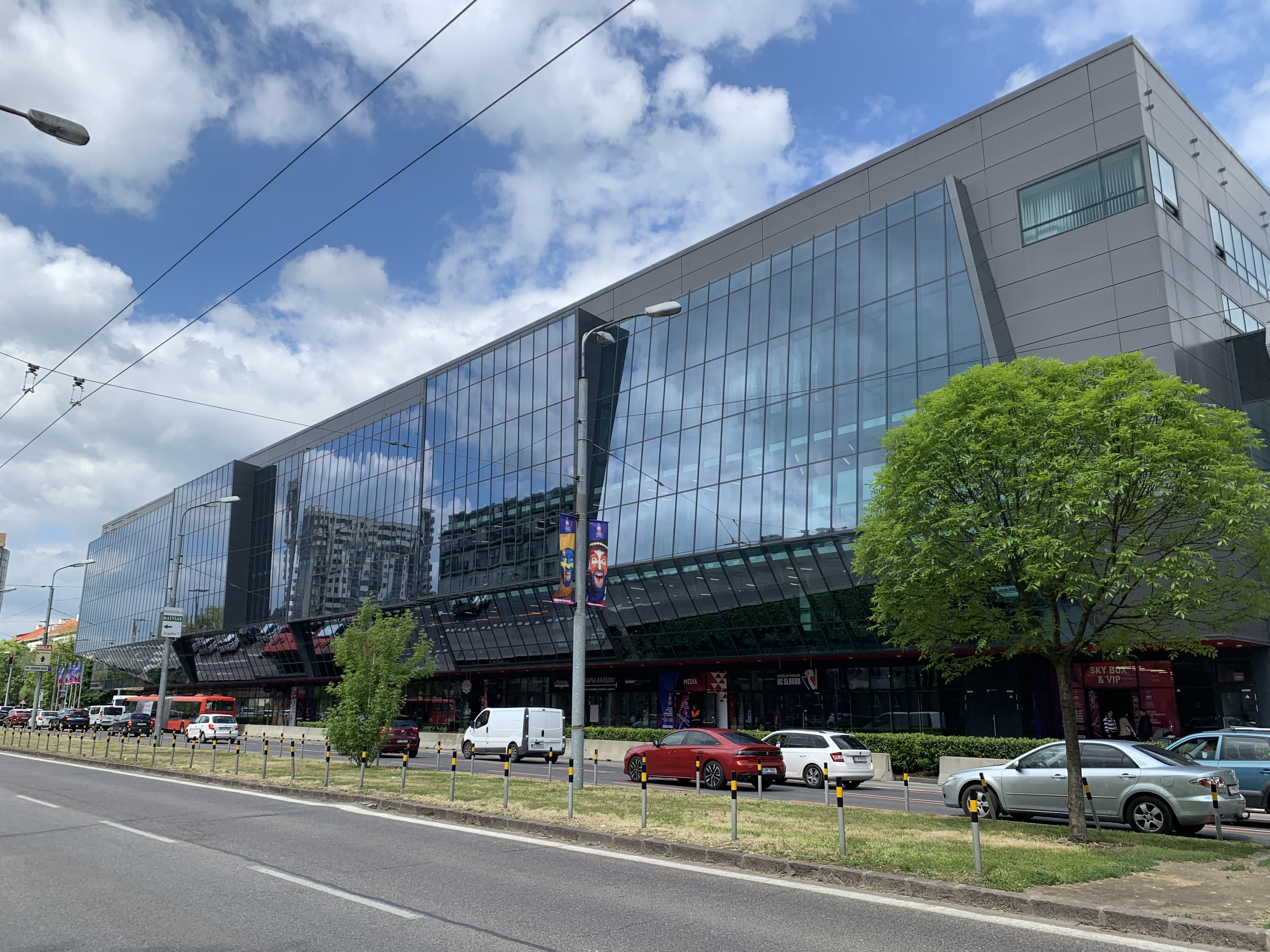
Ondrej Nepela Arena, ice-hockey and mixed use arena

Bratislava contains numerous ice hockey arenas including Ondrej Nepela Arena, the largest stadium and Vladimír Dzurilla Stadium. HC Slovan Bratislava plays at Ondrej Nepela Arena and represented Bratislava from the 2012–13 season to the 2018–19 season in the Kontinental Hockey League. The club, founded in 1921, is a nine-time Slovak Extraliga and one-time Czechoslovak Extraliga winner. HC Slovan also won the 2003-04 Continental Cup. Notable former HC Slovan players include Vladimír Dzurilla, Václav Nedomanský, Peter Šťastný, and Miroslav Šatan. Since 1993, Ondrej Nepela Winter Sports Stadium hosts the Ondrej Nepela Memorial, an annual senior-level international figure skating competition. It co-hosted the 2011 World Championship and 2019 World Championship with Košice.

The Vladimír Dzurilla Stadium hosted the 2026 IIHF Men's World U18 Championships.

== Basketball, Handball, Volleyball, and Water Polo ==
Inter Arena Pasienky (originally Inter Hala Pasienky) is home to two professional clubs— women's basketball club Slovan Bratislava and men's basketball club Inter Bratislava—and training and playing-ground for other teams. Slovan Bratislava competes in the top Slovak league Women's Extraliga, and Inter Bratislava in Men's Extraliga. ŠKP (Športový Klub Polície - Police Sports Club) Bratislava is a handball club. Its women's handball team, founded in 1993, plays in the Women's Handball International League, which is a joint Czech and Slovak top handball league. And its men's handball a-team competes in Handball International League, a joint Czech and Slovak handball league. A volleyball team VKP Bratislava (Volejbalový Klub Polície - Police Volleyball Club) plays in men's Extraliga. Slávia UK Bratislava is a sports club of Comenius University (UK - Univerzita Komenského - Comenius University). Its volleyball team plays in women's Extraliga and its water polo team competes in men's Extraliga.

== Rugby union ==
Bratislava is the centre of rugby union in Slovakia. Rugby in Bratislava date back to at least as early as 1927, when it is recorded that ŠK Slávia Bratislava played a match.
Rugby Klub Bratislava has been established in 2005, and is currently playing with club based next to the borders, in Austria, Czech Republic, and Hungary.

== Gaelic Football (GAA) ==
The Slovak Shamrocks are the first and so far only Gaelic football team in Slovakia. An international club with members from over 16 countries.

The membership of the club consists of individuals from a wide variety of professional backgrounds. It provides an important network of support and is in a position to help its members arrange accommodation, gain employment and grow their social circle after relocating to Bratislava. In July 2011, an Irish Family Sports Day took place in the small town of Čunovo on the outskirts of Bratislava. This modest event saw the first appearance of the Slovak Shamrocks GAA. From these inauspicious beginnings, interest quickly grew in the club, which soon attracted a diverse range of members and followers from all walks of life in Slovakia's capital.

The club now plays in the GAA European Gaelic Football Championships.

== Tennis ==
National Tennis Centre, which includes Aegon Arena, hosts various cultural, sports and social events. Several Davis Cup matches were played there, including the 2005 Davis Cup final between Slovakia and Croatia. Tatra banka Open, an ATP Challenger Series tournament, is hosted annually in NTC. Slovak professional tennis players Dominik Hrbatý and Karol Kučera were born in Bratislava.

In 1966, Bratislava named its new multi-sports stadium after tennis player Ladislav Hecht.

== Speedway ==
The city had a long relationship with motorcycle speedway with several venues existing throughout the city. The first was the stadium at the Slobod Exhibition Center (an agricultural exhibition center), which hosted a final round of the Czechoslovak Individual Speedway Championship in 1949 and 1950.

The next venue was the Jiskry Dimitrov stadium before the speedway team AMK Bratislava constructed a track around the outside of the football pitch at the Štadión Rapid in Ružinov. The team last competed in the 1972 Czechoslovak Team Speedway Championship, although by 1972, there were no remaining venues in Bratislava to use as their home track. The nearest venue to the city was found at Zohor.

== Other ==
Water Sports Centre Čunovo is a slalom and rafting area. The centre is open for public and professionals, including Slovak representatives. The centre hosts several international and national canoe and kayak competitions annually. Devín - Bratislava National run (Národný beh Devín - Bratislava) is the oldest athletic event in Slovakia. The first race was organized in 1921 and the 60th race was celebrated in 2007. The international race is 11,625 metres long and attracts about 1,500 attendants annually. The Bratislava City Marathon is organized annually since 2006. It offers several races, including marathon, half-marathon and skating race. A race track is located in Petržalka. Horse racing and dog racing events and dog shows are held there regularly.
