= 2012–2014 European Nations Cup Third Division =

The 2012–14 European Nations Cup Third Division is the fourth tier of rugby union in Europe behind the Six Nations Championship and the 2012-2014 European Nations Cup First Division and the 2012–14 European Nations Cup Second Division.

This will be the first tournament for Turkey, while returning from the 2010-2012 European Nations Cup Third Division are Slovakia and Azerbaijan. The winning team will be promoted to Division 2D of the European Nations Cup for the 2014–2016 cup.

This tournament, unlike the 1st and 2nd division tournaments, does not form part of the 2015 Rugby World Cup qualification system.

== Division 3A ==
=== 2012–13 ===
Table

2012–13 Champions

Place	Nation	Games					Points			Table points
Place	Nation	played	won	drawn	lost	bonus	for	against	difference	Table points
1	Turkey	2	2	0	0	2	87	9	+78	10
2	Slovakia	2	1	0	1	0	31	50	−19	4
3	Azerbaijan	2	0	0	2	0	19	78	−59	0

Games

11 November 2012	Turkey	34–6	Slovakia	Kemer Kazım Gül Stadium, Antalya, Turkey
	Try: Alı Bökey Sürer 2 (5', 62'), Salım Çavuş 2 (26', 56'), Kerım Galal (48'), Bayram Erdener (67'); Con: Alı Bökey Sürer 2	Team Sheet	Pen: Michal Kučera (15'); Drop: Michal Kučera (9'); Cards: Jan Pfeifer (yellow card) 21' to 31', Petr Kalina (yellow card) 37' to 47'	Referee: (France) Frédéric Gracianette

14 November 2012	Slovakia	25–16	Azerbaijan	Kemer Kazım Gül Stadium, Antalya, Turkey
14:00	Try: Andrej Rábara (15'), Petr Kozubík (40'), Martin Mihalka (55'); Con: Michal Kučera 2 Pen: Michal Kučera 2 (45', 70')	Team Sheet	Try: Renard Aliyev (76'); Con: Eldar Nasrullayev; Pen: Eldar Nasrullayev 3 (6', 25', 53')	Referee: (France) Frédéric Gracianette

17 November 2012	Turkey	53–3	Azerbaijan	Kemer Kazım Gül Stadium, Antalya, Turkey
14:00	Try: Zakir Kalabas 3 (12', 30', 47'), Ogun Boz (15'), Ramazan Kilickaya (31'), Mustafa Kurt (36'), Alper Topal (44'), Alı Bökey Sürer (57'); Con: Alı Bökey Sürer 5 Pen: Alı Bökey Sürer (7')	Team Sheet	Pen: Eldar Nasrullayev (18'); Cards: Parvin Keygubadi (yellow card) 9' to 19', Ilgar Gubadov (yellow card) 28' to 38', Ibraham Abzotov (yellow card) 35' to 45'	Referee: (France) Frédéric Gracianette Game was stopped after 65 minutes due to fights breaking out between players from Azerbaijan and local crowd.

=== 2013–14 ===
Table

2013–14 Champions

Place	Nation	Games				Points			Table points
Place	Nation	played	won	drawn	lost	for	against	difference	Table points
1	Turkey	2	2	0	0	86	6	+80	10
2	Slovakia	2	1	0	1	21	65	−44	5
3	Azerbaijan	2	0	0	2	13	49	−36	0

Games

17 November 2013	Slovakia	18–10	Azerbaijan	Bratislava, Slovakia
14:00	Try: Marek Ujček (65'c), Sam Morgan (78'); Con: Daniel Puha; Pen: Daniel Puha 2 (6', 37')	Team Sheet	Try: Turel Useynov (34'), Ilqar Gubadov (44'); Cards: Rauf Mahmudla (yellow card) 19' to 29'	Referee: (Hungary) Csaba Priskin

20 November 2013	Turkey	31–3	Azerbaijan	Bratislava, Slovakia
14:00	Try: Erkut Levent Durmuş 2 (2'c, 10'), Yasin Bakar (35'), Mert Zapçı (40'c), Zakir Kalabaş (45'c); Con: Ali Bökeyhan Sürer 3 Cards: Toygun Yıldırım (yellow card) 21' to 31'	Team Sheet	Drop: Ilqar Gubadov (28')	Referee: (Czech Republic) Štepán Cekal

23 November 2013	Slovakia	3–55	Turkey	Bratislava, Slovakia
14:00	Pen: Daniel Puha (11'); Cards: Pavel Kozubík (yellow card) 58' to 68'	Team Sheet	Try: Muhammet Bozkurt 3 (14'c, 17', 40'c), Ali Bökeyhan Sürer 2 (25', 63'), Mert Zabçı 2 (37'c, 52'), İbrahim Demircan (47'c), Zakir Kalabaş (80'+5'c); Con: Ali Bökeyhan Sürer 5 Cards: Ogün Boz (yellow card) 80' to 80'	Referee: (Czech Republic) Matej Razga

=== 2012–2014 ===
Table

Promoted to Division 2D for 2014–2016 Cup

Place	Nation	Games					Points			Table points
Place	Nation	played	won	drawn	lost	bonus	for	against	difference	Table points
1	Turkey	4	4	0	0	4	173	15	+158	20
2	Slovakia	4	2	0	2	0	52	115	−63	10
3	Azerbaijan	4	0	0	4	0	32	127	−95	0

== See also ==
- European Nations Cup
- 2012-2014 European Nations Cup First Division
- 2012–2014 European Nations Cup Second Division
