= Blindern Rugbyklubb =

Rugby club in Oslo, Norway

- Full name: Blindern Rugbyklubb
- Founded: 10 December 2010
- Location: Oslo, Norway
- Ground: Voldsløkka (map)
- President: Ben Whitehouse
- Coach: Ben Whitehouse
- Captain: Duncan McCondochie
- League: Norway Rugby Union Championship 15s and 7s
Team kit

Blindern Rugbyklubb is a Norwegian rugby club based in Oslo. They currently compete in the Norway Rugby Championship across Rugby Union, Rugby Sevens and Snow Rugby. Today, they're one of the more international teams in Norway with 20 different nationalities represented and are very inclusive.

== History ==
The club was founded on 10 December 2010 and is today one of the largest clubs in Norway.

The strength of the club has until now being in the 7's team, but in the recent years their 15's-team has started to contest in the top of the Norwegian Rugby 15s-championship. Most recently, they finished 3rd in the championship and the 7's in 2022/2023 and won the annual Snow Rugby in 2023.

In the early years the club logo had been from the club's time as a Student Sports Team. This was not changed until the season of 2014. The logo went from a golden harp to the antler of a deer. This was chosen to represent the club's Norwegian roots and the strength and speed of its players.

== Current squad ==
The squad for the upcoming 2025 season:

Name	Position	Nationality
George Haines	Hooker	(Wales)
Duncan McCondochie	Hooker	(Scotland)
Sebastain Klarholm	Prop	(Norway)
Ben Whitehouse	Prop	(England)
Andre Voigt	Prop	(Norway)
Magnus Bergslid	Lock	(Norway)
Nicolai Neuman	Lock	(Norway)
Peder Reiersrud	Lock	(Norway)
Edmondo Strada	Lock	(Italy)
Jean Boisseau	Lock	(France)
Lachlan Cruickshank	Back Row	(New Zealand)
Johnson Baiga	Back Row	(Uganda)
Magnus Lewis	Back Row	(Wales)
Kai Ranger	Back Row	(South Africa)
Jules Bourgin	Back Row	(France)
Martin Hell	Scrumhalf	(France)
Will Sayer	Scrumhalf	(England)
Benjamin Peter	Five-Eighths	(Australia)
Conan Hoey	Five-Eighths	(Republic of Ireland)
Theo Romer	Five-Eighths	(France)
Harry Handford	Centre	(England)
Max Carroll	Centre	(Australia)
Harry Waterson	Centre	(Scotland)
Gullaume Petit	Outside Back	(France)
Gee Ngala	Outside Back	(Kenya)
Jack Hobbs	Outside Back	(England)
Ewan Lambton	Outside Back	(Scotland)
Salvis Stilbs	Fullback	(Latvia)
Ed Platts	Coach	(England)
