= Andorran Rugby Federation =

Sports governing body in Andorra

Federació Andorrana de Rugby
- Sport: Rugby union
- Founded: 1986; 40 years ago
- World Rugby affiliation: 1990
- Rugby Europe affiliation: 1986
- President: Xavier Vilasetru
- Men's coach: Jeannot Martinho

The Andorran Rugby Federation (Catalan: Federació Andorrana de Rugby) is the governing body for rugby union in Andorra. It was founded in 1986 and became affiliated with World Rugby, previously called the International Rugby Board, in 1991.

== Teams ==
=== Men ===
- Andorra - the national men's rugby union team.
- 7s - the national men's rugby union seven-a-side team.

=== Women ===
- Andorra women's national rugby union team - the national women's rugby union team.
- Women's 7s - the national women's rugby sevens team.

== See also ==
- Andorra national rugby union team
- Rugby union in Andorra
