= Chris Budgen =

- Born: Chris Budgen; 21 January 1973 (age 53) Hamilton, New Zealand
- Height: 1.75 m (5 ft 9 in)
- Weight: 130 kg (20 st 7 lb)

Rugby union career
- Position: Prop
- Current team: Exeter Chiefs
Senior career
Years	Team	Apps	(Points)
1999–2001	Bridgend RFC	134	(30)
2001–08	Northampton	34	(35)
2008–13	Exeter Chiefs		
–	Bedwas RFC		
International career
Years	Team	Apps	(Points)
	British Army	39	(39)

Chris Budgen is a retired rugby player. He played for Bridgend RFC from 1999 to 2001 then played the majority of his professional career for Exeter Chiefs and Northampton Saints in the Aviva Premiership.

He made his debut for Exeter on 30 September 2008 against Esher. His position of choice is Prop. Budgen's try against Worcester for Exeter on 3 Nov 2012 made Budgen the oldest try scorer in the Aviva Premiership at 39 years and 287 days., Budgen dedicated this score to his twin sons who died prematurely two weeks before the game.

Budgen remains a very popular and respected figure among fans of both Exeter and Northampton, with Exeter fans nicknaming him "Budgie" and Saints fans nicknaming him "Chicken". Budgen juggled most of his professional career with that of an active soldier; Budgen is stationed on Salisbury Plain and has also seen action in Helmand Province.

It was announced on 24 May 2013 that Budgen would be going into coaching with the Marlborough RFC colts team.

Later Budgen retired and joined the British Army. When his unit, the 1st Battalion, The Royal Welsh, was deployed to Estonia in 2018 as a part of NATO Enhanced Forward Presence, he volunteered to coach the Estonia national rugby union team.
