= Kadıköy Rugby =

Turkish rugby team

(Turkey) Kadıköy Rugby
- Full name: Kadıköy Rugby Football Club
- Nickname: Bulls of Kadıköy
- Founded: 2006
- Location: Istanbul, Turkey
- Ground: none
- President: (Turkey) Ahmet Eren Kılıç
- Coach: (Turkey) Tahsin Oğulhan Kabadayı
- League: none
1st kit	2nd kit

Official website
- www.kadikoyrugby.com.tr

Kadıköy Rugby was founded by the joint efforts of a group of fellow students from Uskudar Anadolu Lisesi and ex-İstanbul Ottomans rugby player Mert Ataray in early 2006. The establishment of the team quickly drew attention of the lively, hot blooded youth of Kadıköy district and soon settled itself as the future of Turkish rugby. Kadıköy is well known to be symbolized with its bull icon standing in the district square, which was more than suitable to identify the spirit of the team, and the asperity of the rugby sport itself, and quickly became an inspiration to the club's emblem and nickname.

Right after being established, the club registered itself to the Turkish Federation of Rugby, Baseball, Softball and American Football to become the first official rugby club in Turkey.

Today, Kadıköy Rugby is one of the power house in Turkish Rugby. After reaching the final in 2014 and winning the Istanbul 7s tournament, Kadıköy Rugby will be looking to win this season league, launch a Women s team and will be looking to start a Youth section for the season 2015/2016. the primary goal of the club is to encourage rugby nationwide by their campaign to help the founding of new rugby clubs, setting up a national league and to make ground for Turkey national rugby union team as soon as possible.

== First squad (2006) ==
- (Turkey) Ali Bayer
- (Turkey) Ali Noyan Ayturan
- (Turkey) Alper Bilikser
- (Turkey) Aydın Şelte
- (Turkey) Baran Bektaş
- (Turkey) Batuhan Yıldız
- (Turkey) Can Ernur
- (Turkey) Can Girgin
- (Turkey) Can Şenses
- (Turkey) Cem Karadeniz
- (Turkey) Coşkun Yeşil
- (Turkey) Deniz Krom
- (Turkey) Doruk Kemal Kaplan
- (Turkey) Efe Dinçer
- (Turkey) Efecan Kağanoğuzbeyoğlu
- (Turkey) Emre Erdin
- (Turkey) Emre Konuk
- (Turkey) Engin Selimoğulları
- (Turkey) Gökhan Köse
- (Turkey) İlker Yıldız
- (Turkey) Kamer Kuşçu
- (Turkey) Kerem Dinçer
- (Turkey) Mert Ataray
- (Turkey) Mert Can Bayazıtoğlu
- (Turkey) Mertcan Yasa
- (Turkey) Murat Büyükkaymakçı
- (Turkey) Onur Küçük
- (Turkey) Özgür Yalçın
- (Turkey) Ragıp İlker Dinçer
- (Turkey) Rudy M. Celekli
- (Turkey) Samet Çakır
- (Turkey) Serdar Çam
- (Turkey) Umut Turanlı
- (Turkey) Yarkın Özbalcı
- (Turkey) Yekta Ömer Akyol
- (Turkey) Yiğit Özen
- (France) Mathias Cazier
- (France) Nicolas Negre
- (France) Stephane Blanfune
- (France) Stephane Rolandez
- (Sri Lanka) Mohamed Zameel

== 2025 Turkish Men's 15s League Champion Squad ==
- (Turkey) Ahmet Tarık Tekin
- (Turkey) Berk Erdem
- (Turkey) Mustafa Ersoy
- (Turkey) Ahmet Eren Kılıç
- (Turkey) Oğuzhan Tirendez
- (Turkey) Mustafa Efe Avcı
- (Turkey) Oğuzhan Kara
- (Turkey) Alkım Bayraktar (C)
- (Italy) Marco Bernat
- (Turkey) Ali Mert Özbalak
- (Turkey) Alp Aslan
- (Turkey) Mahmut Batuhan Balçın (VC)
- (Turkey) Furkan Keskin
- (Turkey) Sadettin Çelik
- (Turkey) Oğuzhan Demir
- (Turkey) Furkan Güney
- (Turkey) Mete Sencer Göle
- (Turkey) Nurettin Ten
- (Turkey) Ege Eryılmaz
- (Turkey) Yiğit Ege
- (Turkey) Umut Tilkioğlu
- (Turkey) Ramazan Tomruk
- (Turkey) Burak Özkan

In the 2024 season, Kadıköy Rugby won its first official 15-a-side league championship in club history by defeating Hacettepe Rugby 24-0 in the final of the Turkish 15-a-side Rugby League.

In the 2025 season, Kadıköy Rugby defended its title by winning the men's 15-a-side Rugby League championship once again. The final matches were played at the Esenboğa Sports Complex in Ankara, where Kadıköy Rugby defeated Ottomans Rugby with a decisive score of 45-14. Throughout the 2025 season, the team stood out with its disciplined defense, extensive squad rotation, and contributions from players developed from the youth ranks. In the final match, they maintained their dominance throughout the game to lift the trophy. This success is seen as a result of the club's sustainable development model in recent years, its professional training programs, and its community-supported structure, positioning Kadıköy Rugby as one of the leading clubs in the new era of Turkish rugby.

== Related links ==
- Kadıköy Rugby Official Website
- Turkish Federation of Baseball, Softball, Rugby and American Football
