= Ottoman Sevens =

International Rugby Sevens team

(Turkey) Ottoman 7s
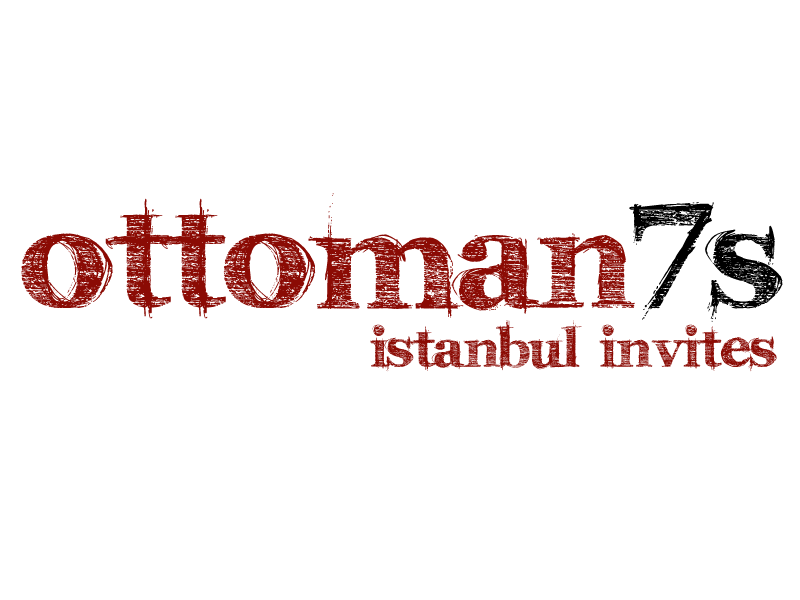
- Full name: Ottoman Sevens
- Nickname(s): The Ottomans, Janissaries
- Founded: 2008
- Location: Istanbul, Turkey
- Ground: International
- Coach: (Netherlands) Hasan Akman
- League: International Sevens Tournaments

Official website
- www.ottoman-sevens.com

The Ottoman Sevens is an international rugby sevens team, with its roots from Istanbul, Turkey. It is a spin-off from the Rugby XV club the Istanbul Ottomans R.F.C. This team works on an "invitational" basis and participates on international Rugby Seven tournaments, starting in Europe and most probably soon around the world. The Ottomans are easily recognized during the tournaments, as they are wearing "fezzes" during the evening and in between their matches. Also, their typical head, shoulder, knee and toe-warming up is a solid hint of where the Ottomans are.

== Istanbul Ottomans R.F.C. ==
The Istanbul Ottomans R.F.C. are the first ever Turkish rugby union team, having been established in 1999. It took almost nine years before the first Turkish National Rugby competition took off, as that started in the year of 2007/2008 together with four other clubs in Turkey and Cyprus. In the meantime, the Ottomans participated in numerous XV, 10s and 7s tournaments in surrounding countries, like Bulgaria, Greece and Russia.

== The aim of the Ottoman 7s ==
The idea of having a separate rugby sevens team working on an invitational basis, rather than continuing under the name of the Istanbul Ottomans R.F.C., is to be able to invite high quality players for sevens tournaments only. With this possibility, the Istanbul Ottomans R.F.C. can continue with their own players to participate on Sevens tournaments, and the Ottoman Sevens can proceed with aiming for higher levels ((semi)pro). With possible successes in (semi)professional levels, the Turkish Rugby will get more attention from both the international rugby community, as well as from the Turkish citizens for whom the sport is relatively unknown.

The broader goal is to raise awareness of the sport in Turkey and encourage more youth to participate, ensuring a strong future for it.

== Tournaments and Results ==
The Ottoman Sevens joined the Ameland Beach Rugby Festival in the Netherlands in June, 2008. The Ottomans - existing in 2008 of players of The Istanbul Ottomans R.F.C. and the Dutch Castricumse R.C. - ended up fourth in the recreational class of 64 teams. The fact that the Ottomans missed out on a place on the stand might be because several key players were not able to attend on the second day (Sunday) in the morning for the play-offs.

In June 2009, the Ottoman 7s were present at the Ameland Beach Rugby Festival again on Ameland, the Netherlands. This team existed of players of the Castricumse R.C., but also a Duke in the shape of Bart Viguurs and a long lost Englishman James. The Ottoman 7s were capable of beating the opponents relatively easy, resulting in lifting the championships' cup at the end of the second day.

In 2010, there will be two big tournaments on the list of the Ottoman 7s: the huge Amsterdam Heineken Sevens, and the inaugural International Istanbul Sevens.
