= İstanbul Ottomans =

(Turkey) İstanbul Ottomans R.F.C
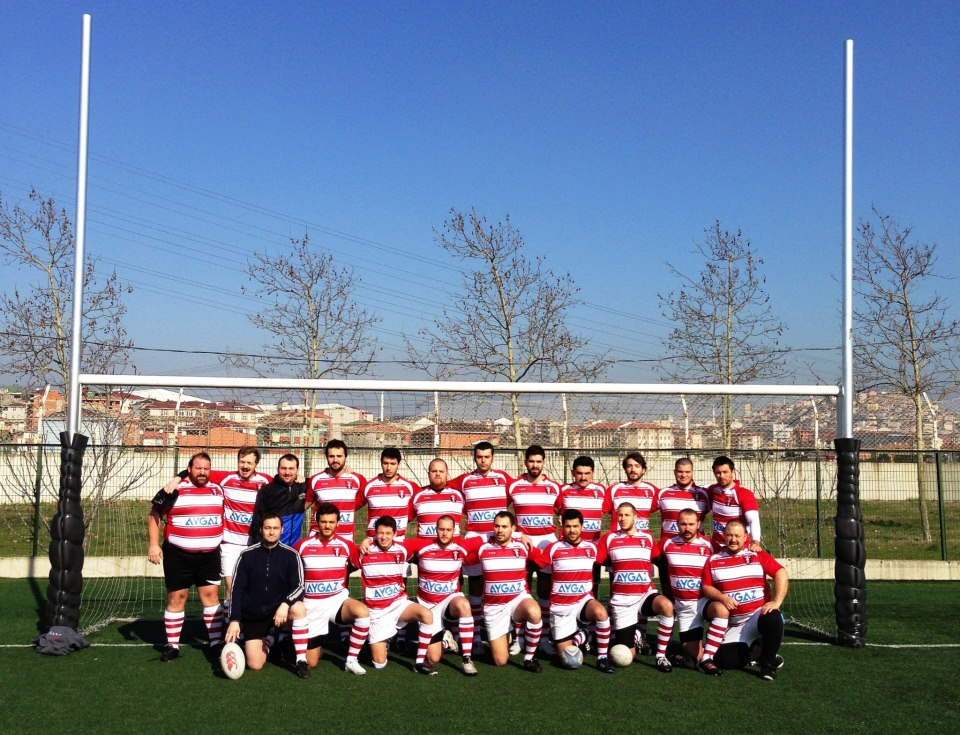
- Full name: İstanbul Ottomans Rugby Football Club
- Nickname(s): The Ottomans, Kaysers
- Founded: 1999
- Location: Istanbul, Turkey
- Ground(s): Dikilitas Spor Kulubu Tesisleri, Besiktas
- President: Orhan Bulman
- Coach(es): Alkım Bayraktar
- League(s): Turkish Rugby Clubs Division
1st kit	2nd kit

Official website
- www.ottomansrugby.com

İstanbul Ottomans R.F.C. is a professional rugby union club based in Istanbul, Turkey. Founded in 1999 by mostly French and English rugby lovers working and living in İstanbul, the Ottomans were the first rugby club to be established in the country, and, until 2006, the only chapter in the history of Turkish rugby prior to the foundation of Turkey's second rugby club, Kadıköy Rugby.

Another first of the İstanbul Ottomans was to win the very first official Turkish Rugby Union competition in the year of 2007 / 2008.

The club has participated in a number of tournaments taking place both in Turkey and abroad, and has formidably good relations with the rugby clubs of neighboring countries. With most of its players having played rugby away back since their junior years, they are a driving force and a role model of experience to other rugby players in Turkey.

The İstanbul Ottomans joined the international Ameland Beach Rugby Festival in The Netherlands in June 2008, as a first Turkish team ever to participate in this tournament. The team played under the name of the Ottoman Sevens. Out of the 64 teams within the 2-day competition, the İstanbul Ottomans just missed out a place on the podium, became 4th and had 1st place in 2009 tournament.

== Current squad ==
- (Scotland) (Turkey) Blake, Alistair Baran
- (Turkey) Baykal, Anılcan
- (Turkey) Baykal, Onur
- (Turkey) Bozanoglu, Mustafa
- (Turkey) Bozoglu, Emre
- (Turkey) Bulman, Orhan
- (Turkey) Çakıner, Gürhan
- (Turkey) Çakıroğlu, Samet
- (Turkey) Cemiloglu, Fuat
- (Turkey) Cicek, Basar
- (Turkey) Colok, Oytun
- (France) Delettre, Jean-François
- (Turkey) Dursun, Sarven
- (France) Gandois, Florent
- (England) Greatorex, Stephen
- (Turkey) Gungormus, Oguzhan
- (France) Hebert, Yannick
- (England) James, Tamwar
- (Turkey) Karadeniz, Deniz
- (Turkey) Küçüktuna, Salih
- (France) Langlois, Thomas
- (New Zealand) Matheson, Alan
- (Turkey) Narbay, Sertac
- (Turkey) (United Kingdom) Önkal, Özer Ali
- (Turkey) (Northern Cyprus) Öztuna, Çağan
- (New Zealand) Reardon, Bryan
- (Turkey) Soysevinç, Ulaş
- (Turkey) Şapçı, Emre
- (Turkey) Şengelen, Yiğit
- (Turkey) Şirinyan, Yenovk
- (Turkey) Tatar, Murat Boygar
- (Turkey) Tezel, Murat
- (Turkey) Tosun, Altug
- (Turkey) Tuğtağ, Melih
- (Turkey) Turkaslan, Cansin
- (Turkey) Turkay, Cenk
- (Turkey) Belentepe, Mehmet Turgut
- (Turkey) Yenidogan, Deniz
- (Turkey) Yesil, Coskun
- (Turkey) Yılmazgüler, Oğuzhan
- (Turkey) Alkan, Vedat
- (Turkey) Bayraktar, Alkım
- (Turkey) Alçar, Ekin
- (Turkey) Erdem, Berk
- (Turkey) Yavuz, Eyüp
- (Turkey) Alkan, Doğukan
