= VPC Andorra XV =

Andorran rugby union club, based in Andorra la Vella

- Full name: Voluntaris de Protecció Civil Andorra Rugby XV
- Union: (Andorra) FAR
- Nickname(s): VPC; L'equip tricolor (Tricolor Team); L'Onada Blava (Blue Wave)
- Founded: 1961; 65 years ago
- Location: Andorra la Vella, Andorra
- Ground(s): Estadi Nacional, Andorra la Vella (Capacity: 3,347)
- President: Gerard Giménez Modesto
- Coach: Daniel Raya Capdevila
- League: (Spain) División de Honor B de Rugby
1st kit	2nd kit

Official website
- vpcandorrarugbyxv.com/inici

Voluntaris de Protecció Civil Andorra Rugby XV (commonly known as VPC Andorra XV) is a rugby union team based in Andorra la Vella, Andorra. The Andorran rugby club currently plays in the Spanish Rugby Division of Honor B after having participated in French competitions until 2022.

== History ==
=== Origins and foundation ===
Rugby is one of the most traditional sports in Andorra. VPC Andorra XV was founded in 1961 as the rugby union section of FC Andorra (Secció de Rugbi del Futbol Club Andorra). A group of students who had practiced rugby during their stay in France and Spain, decided to introduce it in the country. Later the club was renamed VPC Andorra Rugby XV. The acronyms "VPC" means Civil Protection Volunteers (Voluntaris de Protecció Civil in Catalan). The original idea was to get the orders of the fire chief and the service of the country, whenever necessary, to collaborate on various tasks of civil protection: fires, finding missing persons, mountain rescue, in collaboration service order (arrival of the Tour, visit the coprinces, etc...). Although the country currently has an effective structure for Civil Protection, the club is still in its determination to cooperate whenever necessary.

=== Catalan and Spanish stage (1961-1986) ===
At the beginning, VPC Andorra XV joined the Catalan Rugby Federation, following the Spanish Rugby Federation. The first results were quite bright, quickly getting placed among the top of the Catalan and Spanish rugby. Unfortunately, in 1971 the club was agree the federation that his team can not climb the categories of honor never to state. It was said that the team was abroad, comprising by foreign players. The club accepted thinking about they could remove this clause in the future. The Andorran team became overwhelmingly dominated the Rugby Catalan Championship, stringing a series of titles. The Catalan Cup (Copa Catalunya) allowed to also play the Spanish Cup (Copa del Rey de Rugby). The victories in the Spanish Cup was important, defeating top teams of the Catalan and Spanish Rugby Championship (UE Santboiana, FC Barcelona Rugby, RC Cornella, etc...). The Andorran club won a Catalan Cup in 1977, with very satisfactory results, demonstrating that the VPC Andorra should fight in top level categories.

=== French stage (1986-2022) ===
Missing hopes to compete at the highest level of the Spanish rugby system, the club decided to take a decisive step and decided to compete in France in the 1986-87 season on the committee of Roussillon and in the committee Midi-Pyrénées in 1993. Despite some early hard beginning, VPC Andorra XV has been rising steadily and currently live sporting level, a period which is fairly positive having won two promotions and two Honneur Midi-Pyrénées Championship finals, achieving a promotion to Fédérale 3.

=== Return to Spanish competitions (2022-present) ===
On August 1, 2022, the VPC Board made the decision to return to playing in the Catalan Rugby Federation Championships with all categories, male and female, after having played in France for more than 35 years.

VPC was crowned champion of the Catalan Division of Honor by beating Barça Blau 24 to 10 in the final played in Barcelona on Saturday, April 1, 2023.

== Youth and women teams ==
VPC Andorra XV have nowadays a school of rugby. Also the youth team, the second team and women's team are the pillars of the Andorran club project based in the future of rugby in the country.

== Kit evolution ==
Secció de Rugbi del FC Andorra (1961)	Late 1960s	1970-80s	Late 1980s	1990s	Late 1990s	Early 2000s

== Honours ==
Spanish Competition

- Campionat de Catalunya
  - Winners (4): 1975-76, 1976–77, 1977–78, 1978-79
  - Runners-up (3): 1974-75, 1979–80, 1980–81
- Copa del Rey de Rugby:
  - Semi-finalist: 1965
- Copa Catalunya:
  - Winners (1): 1977
  - Runners-up (1): 1975
- Copa Principat:
  - Winners (1): 1972
- Copa President:
  - Winners (1): 1984

French Competition

- Honneur Midi-Pyrénées
  - Winners (1): 2010-11

=== Notable players ===
- (Georgia (country)) Otar Barkalaia - 37 caps for Georgia
