= Turkish Rugby Federation =

Governing body for rugby union in Turkey

- Sport: Rugby union
- Also governs: Baseball/Softball; Cricket; Gridiron football; Lacrosse
- Jurisdiction: National
- Founded: 2011
- Affiliation: World Rugby (2020)
- Regional affiliation: Europe (2012)
- Location: Turkey

Official website
- www.trf.gov.tr

The Turkish Rugby Federation (Türkiye Ragbi Federasyonu) is the governing body for rugby union in Turkey. It was founded in 2011, and became affiliated to Rugby Europe in 2012. Turkey became an associate member of World Rugby in 2020. Turkish Rugby Federation also governs American football, baseball/softball, cricket, and lacrosse activities in Turkey.

== Teams ==
- Turkey national rugby union team
- Turkey national rugby sevens team
- Turkey national rugby league team
- Turkey women's national rugby union team
