= 2010–12 European Nations Cup Third Division =

The 2010-12 European Nations Cup Third Division was a rugby union championship organized under the European Nations Cup.

== Table – Division 3A ==
Place	Nation	Games				Points			Table points
Place	Nation	played	won	drawn	lost	for	against	difference	Table points
1	Bosnia and Herzegovina	3	3	0	0	131	53	+78	15
2	Slovakia	3	1	0	2	61	98	−37	5
3	Azerbaijan	2	0	0	2	22	63	−41	0

25 October 2010

Bosnia and Herzegovina	45–21	Slovakia

Zenica

28 October 2010

Azerbaijan	5–25	Slovakia

Zenica

31 October 2010

Bosnia and Herzegovina	38–17	Azerbaijan

Zenica

9 October 2011

Slovakia	(forfeit)	Azerbaijan

forfeit AZE

12 October 2011

Azerbaijan	(forfeit)	Bosnia and Herzegovina

forfeit AZE

15 October 2011

Slovakia	15–48	Bosnia and Herzegovina

Bratislava
Referee: DIACONESCU (RO)
