= Cyprus Rugby Federation =

Governing body for rugby union in Cyprus

Κυπριακή Ομοσπονδία Ράγκμπι
- Sport: Rugby union
- Founded: 2006; 20 years ago
- World Rugby affiliation: 2014 (Associate Member)
- Rugby Europe affiliation: 2006
- President: Constantinos Constantinides
- Men's coach: TBA
- Website: www.cyprus-rugby.com

The Cyprus Rugby Federation (CRF) (Greek: Κυπριακή Ομοσπονδία Ράγκμπι, Κ.Ο.ΡΑ) (Turkish: Kıbrıs Ragbi Federasyonu (KRF)) the governing body for rugby union in Cyprus. It runs several competitions including a league with teams from the British military bases (Akrotiri, Episkopi and Dhekelia) and four local teams:

- Paphos Tigers
- Limassol Crusaders
- Nicosia Rugby
- Larnaca Spartans
- Paralimni Vipers (newly formed team 2025)

It became affiliated to FIRA in 2006. The CRF was accepted as an affiliated member of World Rugby in November 2014

== History ==
Prior to 2006, there had been no formal governing structure for rugby union in Cyprus. Rugby had previously only been played within a formal structure in the British Overseas Territories of the Sovereign Base Areas of Akrotiri and Dhekelia by British military personnel on the island. In 2003, a South African expat Theo Lenos gathered a team of fellow expats to create Cyprus' first non-military rugby team and played the first official match of rugby union in Cyprus against a British Joint Services team. Gradually seven teams were founded which led to the creation of the Cyprus Rugby Federation in 2006. The Cyprus national rugby union team played its first match a year later. The CRF eventually would receive a funding of €100,000 per annum from the Cyprus Olympic Committee.

In 2013, the CRF applied for membership to the International Rugby Board. However the IRB rejected their application on the grounds that they only had four recognised civilian rugby clubs, excluding the British military clubs, when the IRB required eight teams in order to be eligible for membership and would need at least two years as an Associate Member before they could enter Rugby World Cup qualification. This was despite countries such as Andorra, Greece and United Arab Emirates being granted membership despite not meeting the criteria. The CRF were later granted Associate membership status in 2014. However the IRB prohibited the CRF from administering and playing rugby matches within Northern Cyprus.

Cyprus currently hold the world record for consecutive international match wins with 24 consecutive wins between 2008 and 2014.

== National team ==
The first international game of the Cyprus Rugby National Team took place on 24 March 2007 against Greece in Paphos. The Cypriot XV won the game by 39–3 in front of 2,500 fans.

== See also ==
- Rugby union in Cyprus
- Cyprus national rugby union team
