= Rugby union in Slovakia =

- Slovakia playing Cyprus
- Country: Slovakia
- National team: Slovakia

National competitions
- Rugby World Cup; European Nations Cup; Rugby World Cup Sevens; IRB Sevens World Series

Audience records
- Single match: ? (?). ? vs ? (?, ?)

Rugby union in Slovakia is a minor but growing sport.

== Governing body ==
The governing body is the Slovak Rugby Union.

== History ==
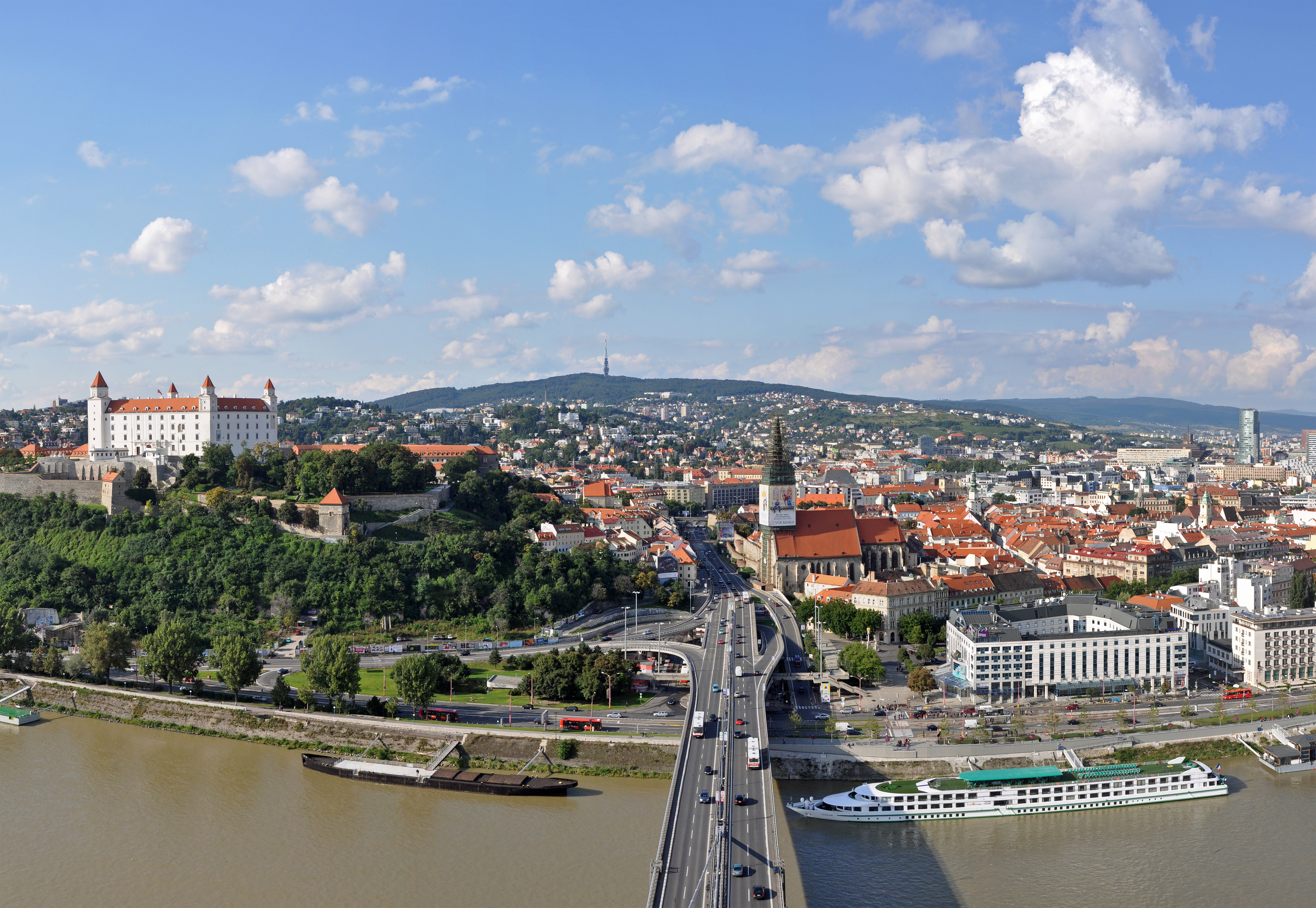
Bratislava, the main centre of Slovak rugby

Rugby union was introduced to Czechoslovakia (as it was then) by the Czech/Moravian writer Ondřej Sekora, when he returned from living in France in 1926, with a rugby ball and set of rules. It developed during the interbellum, but was severely disrupted by the tribulations of World War II, and the Cold War.

Although Slovakia was under the aegis of Czechoslovak rugby bodies, the centre of gravity was firmly in Bohemia and to a lesser extent Moravia, with Slovakia finishing a distant third in terms of participation. However, rugby union was being played in Bratislava by ŠK Slávia Bratislava as early as 1927.

Czechoslovakia was a founder member of FIRA in 1934, and joined the IRB in 1988. The Czechoslovak Rugby Union was founded in 1926; after the Velvet Divorce, Slovakia founded its own in the 1990s.

Like many minor European rugby nations, Slovak rugby has tended to centre on the capital: Bratislava, with fleeting starts in provincial towns and the countryside. It has a minor presence in one or two schools.

Rugby union is completely amateur in Slovakia, leading by RC Slovan Bratislava, club settled in the capital of Slovakia.

== See also ==
- Slovakia national rugby union team
- Rugby Klub Bratislava
