= AEL Limassol Rugby =

Independent rugby union club in Cyprus

(Cyprus) AEL Limassol Rugby
- Full name: AEL Limassol Rugby
- Nickname: Crusaders
- Founded: 2003; 23 years ago as Limassol Crusaders. 2025; 1 year ago as AEL Limassol Rugby
- Location: Limassol, Cyprus
- Ground: AEK Achileas Stadium (Capacity: 2,000)
- Chairman: Antonio Fiorillo
- President: Michael Quain
- Coach: Dave Lee
- Captain: Devon Van Der Merwe
- League: Cyprus Rugby Federation League

AEL Limassol Rugby are the rugby union department of AEL Limassol, Cyprus. They were the second independent (not affiliated to the British or UN Military) rugby club to be formed in Cyprus, after the Paphos Tigers. They were established in late 2003 as Limassol Crusaders and joined AEL in September 2025.

== History ==
The club was formed, as Limassol Crusaders, and initial membership recruited, by word of mouth after the 2003 Rugby World Cup. Temporary training facilities were used initially, including a spell at the Elias Beach Resort Hotel, until the club finally leased the AEK Achileas Stadium in 2004, with the club joining the Joint Services Rugby Football Union and competing formally starting with the 2004/05 season. When the Cyprus Rugby Federation formed its own league, Limassol Crusaders joined it.

When, in 2006, Cyprus formed a national squad, five Crusaders were members of the team that won their inaugural game against Greece.

In 2013, the Crusaders moved to a new stadium in the Mesa Geitonia area of Limassol. The new stadium had a higher capacity, better drainage and conformed better to IRB safety regulations. In 2016, the club moved back to the historical stadium of AEK Achileas after closing the contract with the previous venue.

In 2025, Limassol Crusaders were officially dissolved as the club was integrated into AEL Limassol to become their Rugby department.

== Men's Rugby ==
=== Results ===
(Note: All results before 2025 were by the legacy club, Limassol Crusaders)

==== League ====
Season	League	Final Position
2004/05	JSRFU League	6th
2005/06	JSRFU League	6th
2006/07	JSRFU League	6th
2007/08	JSRFU League	5th
2008/09	JSRFU League	6th
2009/10	JSRFU League	3rd
2010/11	JSRFU League	5th
2011/12	CRF League	4th
2012/13	CRF League	5th
2013/14	CRF League	3rd
2014/15	CRF League	3rd
2015/16	CRF League	3rd
2016/17	CRF League	2nd
2017/18	CRF League	3rd
2018/19	CRF League	Unfinished due to Covid
2019/20	CRF League	Cancelled due to Covid
2025/26	CRF League	Ongoing

==== Tournaments ====
Year	Tournament	Final Position
2009	Aya Nik 15s	4th
2010	Aya Nik 15s	3rd
2011	Aya Nik 15s	3rd
2012	Aya Nik 15s	3rd
2013	Cyprus Beach Rugby	Runner-up
2013	Aya Nik 15s	5th
2015	Warsaw Rugby Festival	Cup Winner

==== Tours ====
Year	Team	Location	Result	Year	Team	Location	Result
2006	Maastricht University (Netherlands)	AEK Achileas Stadium (Cyprus)	Won	2009	Beit Jala Lions (Palestine)	AEK Achileas Stadium (Cyprus)	Won
2009	Cairo Rugby (Egypt)	Cairo (Egypt)	Won	2012	Warwick University (England)	AEK Achileas Stadium (Cyprus)	Lost
2013	Leigh RFC (England)	AEK Achileas Stadium (Cyprus)	Won	2013	URAG (Italy)	Rome Campo Tre Fontane (Italy)	Won
2013	Rugby Roma (Italy)	Rome Campo Tre Fontane (Italy)	Lost	2013	The World (The Bahamas)	Limassol - Mesa Geitonia (Cyprus)	Won
2014	HMS Diamond (United Kingdom)	Limassol - Mesa Geitonia (Cyprus)	Won	2014	Courbet (France)	Limassol - Mesa Geitonia (Cyprus)	Won
2015	Les Zozos (France)	Warsaw - AWF (Note: Match played as part of the Warsaw Rugby Festival) (Poland)	Won	2015	Honey Badgers (Ireland) (Poland)	Warsaw - AWF (Poland)	Drawn
2015	Old Actonians (England)	Warsaw - AWF (Poland)	Lost	2015	Cani Sciolti (Italy)	Warsaw - AWF (Poland)	Lost
2015	Abbeyfeale (Ireland)	Warsaw - AWF (Poland)	Lost	2015	Warsaw Frogs (White) (Poland)	Warsaw - AWF (Poland)	Won
2015	Aberdeen Grammar (Scotland)	Warsaw - AWF (Poland)	Won	2015	Camberley Rugby Vets (England)	AEK Achileas Stadium (Cyprus)	Won
2016	Cirencester RFC (England)	AEK Achileas Stadium (Cyprus)	Lost	2016	Brussels Celtic Barbarians (Belgium)	VUB (Belgium)	Lost
2017	Arlechinii Bucuresti (Romania)	Stadionul Florea Dumitrache (Romania)	Lost	2018	Kyiv Rebels (Ukraine)	Spartak Stadium (Ukraine)	Lost
2018	Jamhour Black Lions (Lebanon)	AEK Achileas Stadium (Cyprus)	Lost	2019	Belgrade Rugby Club Red Star (Serbia)	Ada Ciganlija (Serbia)	Lost
2021	HMS Queen Elizabeth (United Kingdom)	AEK Achileas Stadium (Cyprus)	Lost	2022	Rugby Klub Bratislava (Slovakia)	Športový Areál Ekonomickej Univerzity (Slovakia)	Won
2023	Amatori Napoli Rugby (Italy)	GLS Villaggio del Rugby (Italy)	Lost	2024	Locomotiv Sofia (Bulgaria)	Borisova Gradina (Bulgaria)	Won
2025	Ragbi Klub Zagreb (Croatia)	Rudeš (Croatia)	Won				

=== Captains ===
Note: Flags indicate national union under World Rugby eligibility rules. Players may hold more than one non-World Rugby nationality.

- 2004/06 (Cyprus) Zeno Nicolaou
- 2006/08 (Cyprus) Andrew Spring
- 2008/09 (Wales) Darryl Davies
- 2009/10 (Cyprus) Greg Loucaides
- 2010/11 (Cyprus) Andrew Spring - (Cyprus) Marko Mladenovic
- 2011/13 (Scotland) Fraser Nelson
- 2013/19 (Cyprus) Constantinos Constantinides
- 2019/20 (Zimbabwe) Robert Field
- 2021/25 (Cyprus) Devon Van Der Merwe

== Ladies rugby ==
The ladies section of AEL Limassol Rugby are known as The Sirens. They currently compete in the Women's Cyprus Rugby Federation League, predominantly with the minimal contact version of Touch Rugby; according to the Federation of International Touch (F.I.T) rules. They played their first competitive match, against a team from the visiting HMS Queen Elizabeth, in 2021.

There is also training for the contact versions of rugby union, and smaller local competitions held in the 7's, 10's, and XV's format, numbers permitting.

As of 2025, the Sirens are the title holders of the Women's CRF League.

=== Results ===
==== League ====
Season	League	Final Position
2024/25	Women's CRF League	Winner
2025/26	Women's CRF League	Ongoing

=== Captains ===
- 2023/25 (Germany) Lotte Pollack

=== Coaches ===
- 2024/25 (Cyprus) Panayiotis Karasavvas
- 2025 (England) Steve Wrigglesworth

== Youth rugby ==
As well as the senior teams, AEL Limassol Rugby also encourages youth rugby. The Colts is open to boys and girls aged 13 and older and the Minicru is open to children aged 6 and older.

== Veterans rugby ==
In November 2016 the Limassol Crusaders fielded a Veterans squad for the first time against the Camberley Rugby Vets, who were on tour in Cyprus. The team has been unofficially called "the Commandarias". AEL Limassol Rugby now have a veterans team who train regularly.
