= Norway national rugby union team =

National rugby union team

Norway
- Union: Norges Rugbyforbund
- Head coach: Andrew Evans
- Captain: Ruairidh Salmon
First colours

World Rugby ranking
- Current: 101 (as of 19 June 2026)
- Highest: 100 (2026)

First international
- Denmark 30–12 Norway (1979-06-23)

Biggest win
- Norway 86–5 Finland (1 October 1989)

Biggest defeat
- Sweden 98–0 Norway (26 September 1992)

Norway national rugby union team (Norwegian: Norges nasjonale rugbyunionsteam) represents Norway in men's international rugby union competitions, It's a member of the Rugby Europe and plays in Rugby Europe's Conference 2- North Championship.

Norway's once-captain and a rare professional player is Erik Lund, who played until 2010 at lock for Leeds Carnegie. Erik is the brother of England international Magnus Lund, and joined him at Biarritz Olympique in France from autumn 2010. Lund had been unavailable to play for Norway since 2006, however played for Norway in May 2010 against Slovenia.

The national side is ranked 100th in the world (as of 19 of march 2025).

== Current squad ==
Norway's Training Squad for the 2016/17 Rugby Europe Conference 2- North Championship. Norway lost to Hungary; 41-7 (32-0), on 22 April in Eztergom. They defeated Estonia, 43-16 (17-13) on 6 May, in Oslo.

Name	Position	Club	Country of Birth
Bastian Fromm	Prop	Blindern Rugbyklubb	(Germany)
Levan Abramishvili	Prop	Stavanger Rugbyklubb	(Georgia (country))
Lloyd Hopkin	Prop	Bergen Rugbyklubb	(Australia)
Mats Hallerud	Prop	Blindern Rugbyklubb	(Norway)
Even Syrdahl Ellingsen	Hooker	Blindern Rugbyklubb	(Norway)
James Buncle	Hooker	Stavanger Rugbyklubb	(Norway)
Lasse Eri Marthinsen	Hooker	NTNUI Rugby	(Norway)
Merwan Boughalem	Hooker	Oslo Rugbyklubb	(France)
Axel Wilhelmsen	Lock	Stavanger Rugbyklubb	(Norway)
Magnus Andersson	Lock	Oslo Rugbyklubb	(Sweden)
Martin Skovly	Lock	Oslo Rugbyklubb	(Norway)
Lars Thorkildsen	Flanker	Horten Rugbyklubb	(Norway)
Pascal Raclin	Flanker	Oslo Rugbyklubb	(France)
Jakob Ofsthus Henrikson	Flanker	-	(Norway)
Andrew Fraser-Smith	Number 8	Blindern Rugbyklubb	(England)
Lachlan Doyle	Number 7	Westcliff Rugby Club	(England)
Fredrik Skovly	Number 8	Oslo Rugbyklubb	(Norway)
Erik Cavan	Number 8	GHA RFC	(Scotland)
Charles Henry Francis Pembroke-Birss	Halfback	Oslo Rugbyklubb	(Australia)
Jon Michael Moulton	Halfback	Blindern Rugbyklubb	(Norway)
Thierry Davy	Halfback	Blindern Rugbyklubb	(France)
Adriaan Botha	Flyhalf	Oslo Rugbyklubb	(South Africa)
Aleksander Næss-Clarke	Flyhalf	Horten Rugbyklubb	(Norway)
Erlend Høen Laukvik	Centre	Oslo Rugbyklubb	(Norway)
Espen Høgset	Centre	Blindern Rugbyklubb	(Norway)
Kristoffer Borsheim	Centre	Stavanger Rugbyklubb	(Norway)
Mattias Lindqvist	Centre	NTNUI Rugby	(Sweden)
Thomas Bichard-Breaud	Centre	Oslo Rugbyklubb	(Norway)
Carlos Rodriguez	Wing	Stavanger Rugbyklubb	(Spain)
Fredtrik Northun	Wing	Stavanger Rugbyklubb	(Norway)
Tobias Carcary Nygaard	Wing	NTNUI Rugby	(Norway)
Francis Ramon James Skaret Hunt	Fullback	Oslo Rugbyklubb	(Norway)

=== Coaching staff ===
Name	Position
(Scotland) Andrew Evans	Head coach
(England) Tom Geere	Ass. coach
(Norway) Kristina Ruffles-Isene	Team Manager
(England) Emily Middleton	Physio

== Overall Record ==
Below is a table of the representative rugby matches played by a Norway national XV at test level up until 24 October 2026, updated after match with Luxembourg.

Against	Played	Won	Lost	Drawn	Win percentage
Andorra	4	0	4	0	0%
Armenia	1	0	1	0	0%
Austria	9	5	3	1	55.56%
Azerbaijan	1	1	0	0	100%
Bosnia and Herzegovina	5	2	3	0	40%
Bulgaria	7	4	3	0	57.14%
Croatia	1	0	1	0	0%
Denmark	23	1	21	1	4.35%
Estonia	4	4	0	0	100%
Finland	20	11	9	0	55%
Greece	2	1	1	0	50%
Hong Kong	1	0	1	0	0%
Hungary	7	0	7	0	0%
Israel	5	1	4	0	20%
Jamaica	1	0	1	0	0%
Latvia	6	0	6	0	0%
Lithuania	3	0	3	0	0%
Luxembourg	8	1	7	0	12.5%
Malta	1	0	0	1	0%
Moldova	1	0	1	0	0%
Monaco	1	0	1	0	0%
Poland	1	0	1	0	0%
Russia	1	0	1	0	0%
Slovenia	2	0	2	0	0%
Sweden	7	0	7	0	0%
Turkey	2	1	1	0	50%
Total	124	31	90	3	25%
