= Belarus national rugby union team =

The Belarus' national rugby union team first test match was played in 1935 as the Byelorussian Soviet Socialist Republic against the Russian Soviet Federative Socialist Republic in a neutral ground of Finland. Belarus won, 1–0.

Player selection for the national team is typically sourced from the largest rugby clubs in Minsk, due to the sport's large presence in the city. A precedent of selecting players from the student rugby society at the Belarusian State University has been set since the university's founding.

== Record ==
Below is a table of the representative rugby matches played by a Belarus national XV at test level up until 21 May 2016, updated after match with Montenegro.

| Opponent | Played | Won | Lost | Drawn | % Won |
|---|---|---|---|---|---|
| Estonia | 1 | 0 | 1 | 0 | 0% |
| Montenegro | 1 | 0 | 1 | 0 | 0% |
| Slovakia | 1 | 0 | 1 | 0 | 0% |
| Total | 3 | 0 | 3 | 0 | 0% |
