= Azerbaijan national rugby union team =

National rugby union team

Azerbaijan
- Union: Azerbaijan Rugby Union
- Founded: 2004
- Coach: Malkhaz Cheishvili
Team kit

First international
- Bosnia and Herzegovina 36–17 Azerbaijan (Zenica, Bosnia and Herzegovina; 16 April 2005)

Largest win
- Azerbaijan 6–0 Slovakia (Baku, Azerbeijan; 9 May 2009)

Largest defeat
- Cyprus 58–0 Azerbaijan (Paphos, Cyprus; 6 March 2010)

World Cup
- Appearances: 0

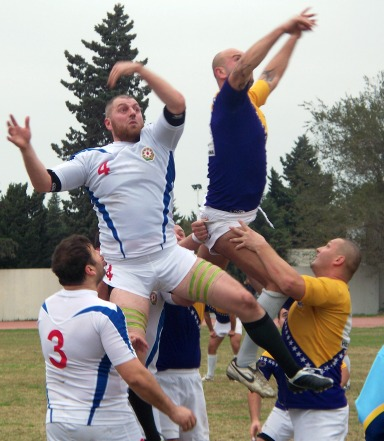
Azerbaijan playing Bosnia

The Azerbaijan national rugby union team competes in division 3D of the European Nations Cup. Azerbaijan have yet to qualify for the Rugby World Cup.

== Competitive record ==
=== Sevens ===
- 2006 European Sevens Championship

=== Union ===
- 2004–2006 European Nations Cup Third Division
- 2006–2008 European Nations Cup Third Division
- 2008–2010 European Nations Cup Third Division
- 2010–12 European Nations Cup Third Division
- 2012–2014 European Nations Cup Third Division

== Record ==
Below is a table of the representative rugby matches played by an Azerbaijan national XV at test level up until 20 November 2013, updated after match with Turkey.

Opponent	Played	Won	Lost	Drawn	% Won
Bosnia and Herzegovina	6	1	5	0	16.67%
Cyprus	3	0	3	0	0%
Greece	2	0	2	0	0%
Israel	1	0	1	0	0%
Luxembourg	1	0	1	0	0%
Monaco	2	0	2	0	0%
Norway	1	0	1	0	0%
Slovakia	5	1	4	0	20%
Turkey	2	0	2	0	0%
Total	22	3	19	0	13.64%

== See also ==
- FIRA-AER
