= Estonia national rugby union team =

National rugby union team

Estonia
- Union: Estonian Rugby Union
- Coach: Chris Budgen
Team kit	Change kit

First international
- Estonia 15 – 22 Finland (Viimsi, Estonia; 22 May 2010)

Largest win
- Montenegro 0 – 106 Estonia (Budva, Montenegro; 14 April 2015)

Largest defeat
- Denmark 127 – 5 Estonia (Odense, Denmark; 28 April 2018)

The Estonia national rugby union team is governed by the Estonian Rugby Union, which oversees all rugby union in Estonia. As of October 2014 they have played only a handful of matches, but have qualified for the 2014–16 European Nations Cup Third Division. The team's main stadium was Viimsi Staadion for several years.

== History ==
A combined Estonia/Latvia side took on a Swedish representative side in the late 1990s, but a proper national team only started playing in August 2009, touring England and playing two matches, losing both. They came up against Kent club Tonbridge Juddians in their first match, coming out at the wrong end of a 94–7 scoreline. The Juddians gave them a rather torrid time in the scrums, which was probably influenced by the fact that the Estonians only had their first-ever scrum machine session on the morning of the match. The second fixture saw them square off against England Deaf at Folkestone, this time managing to keep the score to a respectable 21–27.

Estonia have since played several matches as they have built up their team. They were defeated by the Welsh national deaf team in Tallinn, losing 93–3 in June 2012, with closer defeats to Finland, Finland 'A' and Turkey.

Estonia obtained their first win a play-off match for a position in the 2014–16 European Nations Cup Third Division, defeating Belarus 59–12.

== Record ==
Below is a table of the representative rugby matches played by an Estonia national XV at test level up until 17 October 2026, updated after match with Luxembourg.

Opponent	Played	Won	Lost	Drawn	% Won
Belarus	1	1	0	0	100%
Denmark	2	0	2	0	0%
Finland	7	0	7	0	0%
Hungary	1	0	1	0	0%
Latvia	1	0	1	0	0%
Luxembourg	3	0	3	0	0%
Montenegro	2	1	1	0	50%
Norway	4	0	4	0	0%
Presidents XV	1	1	0	0	100%
Slovakia	1	1	0	0	100%
Turkey	2	0	2	0	0%
Total	25	4	21	0	16%

== Squad for the 2016 European Nations Cup ==
- Ragnar Toompere
- Taavi Ermel
- Mamukel Gorelashvili
- Ashwath Venkatasubramanian
- Lauri Laaniste
- Rasmus Toompere
- Mihkel Parn
- Kaarel Kokemagi
- Jaan Lorens
- Karmo Lomp
- Pedro Gallardo
- Andre Astre
- Kimmo Kokemagi
- Kullar Veersalu
- Rob Kalso
- Marvin Uurike
- Chris Wallace
- Luke Veebel
- Aivar Lohmus
- Eerik Oja
- Kristjan Kotkas
- Karl Pallas

== See also ==
- Rugby union in Estonia
- Estonian Rugby Union
