= Paphos Tigers =

Independent rugby union club in Cyprus

The Paphos Tigers are an independent rugby union club based in Paphos, Cyprus. They are known as the first independent (not affiliated to the British or UN Military) rugby club in Cyprus. They have been established since July 10, 2003. The Paphos Tigers have a senior rugby team as well as a minis rugby section which is responsible to develop and promote rugby union in the Paphos region. The Tigers compete in various competitions ranging from the 15's, 10's, 7's and beach rugby. The minis enter into tag tournaments that run monthly during the season in the different towns.

== History ==
Having starting playing rugby in Cyprus as a small independent team, organising ad hoc games with various opposition, the Tigers soon joined the JSRFU (Joint Service Rugby Football Union), along with their rivals, the Limassol Crusaders, which administers the services league in Cyprus. The Tigers now play in the league which falls under the CRF Cyprus Rugby Federation

Alongside the league competition there is also a cup competition between the teams who have entered the league.

The team were predominantly made up of South Africans who learned the game from their home countries, and British resettlers. Cyprus national rugby union team.

== Recent record ==
Year	Position
2006/7	3rd place
2007/8	2nd place
2008/9	1st place (Champions)

== Teams ==
Category	Age
Seniors	17 years +
Colts	13 years up to 16 years +
Minis	Under 13's
Minis	Under 11's
Minis	Under 9's
Minis	Under 7's
Minis	Under 5's

== International players ==
Name	Position
Antonis Thoma	Hooker
Christoforos Thoma	No 8
George Agathocleous	Center
Dimitri Maratheftis	Scrumhalf
Michael Maratheftis	Wing
Jack Bilton	Lock
Max Bilton	Lock
Tony Crasas	Flyhalf
Costa Pavlou	Wing
Callum Cowley	Fullback
Stavros Charalambous	Prop
Dinu Florendan	Prop
Vladimir Mihaylov	Lock
Graeme Scott	Hooker
AJ Pugh	Flank
Marcus Holden	Flyhalf
Ryan Bennett	Scrumhalf
Warren Dean	No 8

== See also ==
- Cyprus Rugby Federation
