= Andorra national rugby union team =

National rugby union team

Andorra
- Nickname: Els Isards
- Union: Federació Andorrana de Rugby
- Head coach: Paul Alieu; Thierry Barbière
First colours	Second colours

World Rugby ranking
- Current: 79 (as of 19 June 2026)
- Highest: 72 (23 November 2020)

First international
- Andorra 24 – 3 Luxembourg (Andorra la Vella, Andorra; 8 October 1987)

Biggest win
- Andorra 76 – 3 Norway (Andorra la Vella, Andorra; 4 September 2004)

Biggest defeat
- Malta 89 – 3 Andorra (Paola, Malta; 24 March 2018)

The Andorra national rugby union team, nicknamed Les Isards ("the chamoises"), represent the Andorran Rugby Federation (FAR) in international rugby union competitions. They play most of their home games in Andorra la Vella, the country's capital, though have had some matches in Foix, which is in France.

They compete in the European Nations Cup, and are currently in the second division. As well as playing numerous friendlies they have also taken part in the qualification stages of the Rugby World Cup, competing in every tournament since 1995.

The national side is ranked 83rd in the world, as of 3 November 2025.

== History ==
The first international game that Andorra played was on 8 November 1987 when they took on Luxembourg in the third division of the 1987–89 FIRA Trophy. Andorra would win that match 24–3 to receive their only win in the third division as they lost both games to Bulgaria and the reverse game. After qualifying for the second division in the following year, they would finish bottom of their group which would feature Morocco, Tunisia and Portugal.

Andorra attempted to qualify for the 1995 Rugby World Cup. They competed in the preliminary round in the west group of the European qualification. They defeated Denmark, but lost to Switzerland, and were knocked out.

Andorra also attempted to qualify for the 1999 Rugby World Cup. Andorra started off in Pool 3 of Round 1, and won all four of their fixtures, finishing at the top of the final standings to advance through to Round 2. However they were then knocked out of qualifying after Round 2 coming last in a five team group.

They competed in Pool B of Round 1 in attempting to qualify for the 2003 World Cup, but did not advance to the next stage coming third in a six team group.

The 2007 tournament saw many more fixtures and gained the small nation some greater publicity by playing in the first match of the tournament, beating Norway 76–3. They won a 2 leg match, came third in the ensuing five team group thus qualifying for a further 2 leg playoff, victory in which led to a further five team group in which they were last. Competing with the more populous Moldova, Netherlands, Spain and Poland, having beaten Norway, Hungary, Slovenia and Sweden certainly brought Andorra to the attention of more rugby followers, all in spite of a small population of just 70,000.

== Popularity ==
The popularity of football in Andorra has been on the decline due to a poor record at home and away. This has left room for Andorran rugby to rise out of the shadows. Mainly affected by the fanatical popularity of rugby in southern France, Els Isards continue to impress on the international stage. This has led to the rapid increase in the number of registered players in Andorra. Many are now suggesting that rugby in Andorra has grown to such an extent that it has now become the tiny nation's national sport.

As well as a men's 15 aside team, the men have competed in the European Sevens competition since 2005. In 2005 they won promotion to the next division and in both 2006 and 2007 made the finals of the competition.

Also Andorra have a women's set up. They have only played sevens so far, competing in 2006 and 2007.

Youth rugby in Andorra is less developed and has to date only consisted of training camps.

== Record ==
Below is a table of the representative rugby matches played by a Andorra national XV at test level up until 17 October 2026, updated after match with Israel.

Opponent	Played	Won	Drawn	Lost	% Won
Armenia	3	1	0	2	33.33%
Austria	2	2	0	0	100%
Bosnia and Herzegovina	4	2	0	2	50%
Bulgaria	7	2	0	5	28.57%
Catalonia	2	0	0	2	0%
Croatia	7	1	1	5	14.29%
Cyprus	4	3	0	1	75%
Czech Republic	3	1	0	2	33.33%
Denmark	5	2	1	2	40%
Finland	1	0	0	1	0%
Germany	1	0	0	1	0%
Hungary	6	5	0	1	83.33%
Israel	8	3	0	5	37.5%
Latvia	6	2	0	4	33.33%
Lithuania	5	1	0	4	20%
Luxembourg	5	3	1	1	60%
Malta	6	1	0	5	16.67%
Moldova	1	0	0	1	0%
Monaco	2	2	0	0	100%
Morocco	2	0	0	2	0%
Netherlands	3	0	0	3	0%
Norway	4	4	0	0	100%
Poland	5	0	0	5	0%
Portugal	3	0	0	3	0%
Serbia	8	6	0	2	75%
Slovakia	1	1	0	0	100%
Slovenia	7	4	0	3	57.14%
Spain	3	0	0	3	0%
Sweden	5	3	0	2	60%
Switzerland	7	1	0	6	14.29%
Tunisia	4	1	0	3	25%
Turkey	2	1	0	1	50%
Yugoslavia	4	2	0	2	50%
TOTAL	131	51	3	77	38.93%

== Current squad ==
Starting line-up for opening 2023-24 Rugby Europe Conference match against Denmark.

- Caps & age not updated.
- Head coach: Thierry Barbiere

Note: Flags indicate national union for the club/province as defined by World Rugby.

Player	Position	Date of birth (age)	Caps	Club/province
Lluc Cunill	Prop	{{{age}}}	{{{caps}}}	VPC Andorra XV
Irakli Berdzenishvili	Hooker	{{{age}}}	{{{caps}}}	VPC Andorra XV
Benjamin Franken	Prop	{{{age}}}	{{{caps}}}	
Xavier Vicente	Lock	{{{age}}}	{{{caps}}}	VPC Andorra XV
Bastien Trape	Lock	{{{age}}}	{{{caps}}}	(France) Stade Niçois
Nil Tomé	Flanker	{{{age}}}	{{{caps}}}	VPC Andorra XV
Galdric Calvet	Flanker	{{{age}}}	{{{caps}}}	VPC Andorra XV
Tiago Macedo	Number 8	{{{age}}}	{{{caps}}}	VPC Andorra XV
Leon Laguerre	Scrum-half	{{{age}}}	{{{caps}}}	VPC Andorra XV
Sacha Franken	Fly-half	{{{age}}}	{{{caps}}}	
Storm Fachaux	Wing	{{{age}}}	{{{caps}}}	VPC Andorra XV
Josep Arasanz	Centre	{{{age}}}	{{{caps}}}	VPC Andorra XV
Adrià Calvo	Centre	{{{age}}}	{{{caps}}}	VPC Andorra XV
Adrià Santuré	Wing	{{{age}}}	{{{caps}}}	VPC Andorra XV
Thibaut Trape	Fullback	{{{age}}}	{{{caps}}}	
Didac Garcia	Prop	{{{age}}}	{{{caps}}}	VPC Andorra XV
Pol Arias	??	{{{age}}}	{{{caps}}}	
Miquel Ortega	Prop	{{{age}}}	{{{caps}}}	VPC Andorra XV
Ricardo Quintino	Lock	{{{age}}}	{{{caps}}}	VPC Andorra XV
Marcel Montella	??	{{{age}}}	{{{caps}}}	
Arnau Granyena	??	{{{age}}}	{{{caps}}}	VPC Andorra XV
Ian Granyena	??	{{{age}}}	{{{caps}}}	VPC Andorra XV
Victor Casajuana	Centre	{{{age}}}	{{{caps}}}	
