= Turkey national rugby union team =

Men's team representing Turkey in international rugby union

Turkey
- Nickname: Ay Yıldızlar (The Crescent Stars)
- Union: Turkish Rugby Federation
- Head coach: Niall Doherty
First colours	Second colours

World Rugby ranking
- Current: 83 (as of 4 November 2024)
- Highest: 83 (4 November 2024)
- Lowest: 94 (29 January 2024)

First international
- Slovakia 5–31 Turkey (Bratislava, Slovakia; 19 April 2012)

Biggest win
- Slovakia 3–55 Turkey (Bratislava, Slovakia; 23 November 2013)

Biggest defeat
- Ukraine 53–0 Turkey (Chisinau, Moldova; 26 September 2026)

World Cup
- Appearances: 0

The Turkey national rugby union team is a relatively recent creation, being started at the end of 2009. Turkey is currently a third-tier side. The team first played in 2012 against Slovakia and won 31–5 in Bratislava. On tour, they also defeated Estonia 49–5 in Tallinn. Turkey has yet to play in the qualifying stages for the Rugby World Cup finals.

Rugby union in Turkey is administered by the Turkish Rugby Federation (Türkiye Ragbi Federasyonu). The federation is affiliated to Rugby Europe (formerly FIRA-AER), and as of 11th May 2023 a full member of World Rugby (formerly IRB). Murat Pazan is the federation's president.

== Competitive record ==
=== Rugby Europe ===
- 2012–2014 European Nations Cup Third Division
- 2014–2016 European Nations Cup Second Division
- 2016–17 Rugby Europe Conference
- 2017–18 Rugby Europe International Championships
- 2018–19 Rugby Europe International Championships
- 2019–20 Rugby Europe International Championships
- 2021–22 Rugby Europe International Championships
- 2022–23 Rugby Europe International Championships
- 2023–24 Rugby Europe International Championships

== Current squad ==
- Guven Tasoglu (Based in England)
- Abdullah Gunes (ODTÜ SK)
- Dinçhan Kilercioğlu (ODTÜ SK)
- Kemal Ege Gurkan (ODTÜ SK)
- Ertugrul Gunday (ODTÜ SK)
- Doğu Eroğlu (ODTÜ SK)
- Koray Kaya (Samsun RK)
- Adem Selim (Samsun RK)
- Selçuk Kozlu (Samsun RK)
- Yavuz Kocaer (Samsun RK)
- Mustafa Kemal Kurt (Koç Üniversitesi SK)
- Mehmet Akif Ersoy (Trakya Üniversites Ragbi)
- Deniz Krom (Kadıköy RK)
- Mert Zabci (Based in England)
- Murat Altun (Based in France)
- Semih Aydın (Based in France)
- Bahri Dagli (Based in France)
- Huseyin Sasmaz (Based in France)
- Ramazan Kilickaya (RC Vichy)
- Gokhan Ceylan (Based in France)
- Atilla Demir (Based in France)
- Necmi Kara (Based in France)
- Hüseyin Yesik (Based in France)
- Melikşah Kuzucu (Based in France)
- Kerim Galal (Based in Germany)
- Erkut Levent Durmus (Based in Germany)
- Ali Bökeyhan Sürer (Based in Germany)
- Tamer Celikbas James (Based in Wales)
- Cenk Tekin Akdeniz (Based in Scotland)
- Tarik Tin (Based in England)
- Arin Gulsen (Based in Wales)

== Record ==
Below is a table of the representative rugby matches played by a Turkey national XV at test level up until 3 October 2026, updated after match with Bulgaria.

Opponent	Played	Won	Lost	Drawn	% Won
Andorra	2	1	1	0	50%
Austria	1	0	1	0	0%
Azerbaijan	2	2	0	0	100%
Bosnia and Herzegovina	5	0	4	1	0%
Bulgaria	8	2	5	1	25%
Estonia	3	3	0	0	100%
Finland	2	1	1	0	50%
Moldova	3	0	3	0	0%
Montenegro	2	1	1	0	50%
Norway	2	1	1	0	50%
Serbia	6	1	5	0	16.67%
Slovakia	3	3	0	0	100%
Slovenia	1	0	1	0	0%
Ukraine	2	0	2	0	0%
Total	42	15	25	2	35.71%

== See also ==
- Rugby union in Turkey
- Samoa national rugby union team
- 2024 mid-year rugby union tests
- Test match (rugby union)
- Hurricanes (rugby union)
- List of South Africa rugby union test matches
- 2006 June rugby union tests
- Mid-year rugby union internationals
- World Rugby Rankings
- Rugby Europe
- List of women's international rugby union test matches
- 2018 June rugby union tests
- Autumn rugby union internationals
