= Slovakia national rugby union team =

National rugby union team

Slovakia
- Union: Slovak Rugby Union
- Coach: Eduard Krützner
- Captain: Daniel Puha
- Most caps: 3 players (8)
Team kit

First international
- Slovakia 6–0 Monaco (14 October 2006)

Largest win
- Slovakia 65–0 Montenegro (23 April 2022)

Largest defeat
- Ukraine 135–13 Slovakia (Piešťany, Slovakia; 9 November 2024)

The Slovakia national rugby union team has yet to qualify for a Rugby World Cup. They are currently affiliated to FIRA-AER, but not yet to World Rugby.

== History ==
Slovakia played their first match in 2006 against the Principality of Monaco and lost 0-6. However, the points went to them after it was discovered that Monaco had used ineligible players.

In 2009, they withdrew from European competition for financial reasons, after having been unable to secure sponsorship. However, they returned to European competition in 2010, playing in the 2010–12 European Nations Cup Third Division.

The new dynamic has been supported by the city of Bratislava and the Government of Slovakia.

== Record ==
Below is a table of the representative rugby matches played by a Slovakia national XV at test level up until 14 November 2026, updated after match with Albania.

Opponent	Played	Won	Lost	Drawn	% Won
Albania	2	1	1	0	50%
Andorra	1	0	1	0	0%
Austria	3	0	3	0	0%
Austria A	1	1	0	0	100%
Azerbaijan	5	4	1	0	80%
Belarus	1	1	0	0	100%
Bosnia and Herzegovina	3	0	3	0	0%
Bulgaria	2	0	2	0	0%
Cyprus	3	0	3	0	0%
Estonia	1	0	1	0	0%
Greece	1	0	1	0	0%
Hungary	1	0	1	0	0%
Monaco	1	1	0	0	100%
Montenegro	3	3	0	0	100%
Presidents XV	1	1	0	0	100%
Serbia	3	0	3	0	0%
Slovenia	3	0	3	0	0%
Turkey	2	0	2	0	0%
Ukraine	1	0	1	0	0%
Total	38	12	26	0	31.58%

== See also ==
- Rugby union in Slovakia
- Czechoslovakia national rugby union team
