= Sport in Tricity =

The following is a list of sports teams in the area of Tricity agglomeration, which includes the Polish cities of Gdańsk, Gdynia and Sopot.

== Football ==
=== Men's ===
- Lechia Gdańsk — football team (Polish Cup winner 1983 & 2019, Polish Supercup winner 1983 & 2019; plays in the Ekstraklasa, formed in 1945)
- Arka Gdynia — football team (Polish Cup winner 1979 & 2017, Polish Supercup winner 2017 & 2018; plays in the I liga, formed in 1929)
- Bałtyk Gdynia — football team (formed in 1930)
- Gedania 1922 Gdańsk — football team (the reactivated club for Gedania Danzig, formed in 1945)
- SKS Stoczniowiec Gdańsk — football team (Polish Cup semi-finalists in 1975–76, formed in 1945)
- Portowiec Gdańsk — football team (formed in 1957)
- KP Jaguar Gdańsk — football team (formed in 2001)
- Tricity Derby - rivalry between Arka and Lechia
- PDP Ogniwo Sopot - football team (formed in 2018)

=== Women's ===
- AP Orlen Gdańsk — women's football team (plays in the Ekstraliga, formed in 2014)
- Lechia Gdańsk Ladies — women's football team (formed in 2014)

=== Former teams ===
- BuEV Danzig — men's football team (played from 1903–1945)
- Gedania Danzig — men's football team (became Gedania 1922 Gdańsk in 1945, played from 1922–1939)
- Lechia-Polonia Gdańsk — men's football team (created by a merger between Lechia Gdańsk and SKS Stoczniowiec Gdańsk, then known as "Polonia Gdańsk", played from 1998–2002)
- Olimpia-Lechia Gdańsk — men's football team (created by a merger between Lechia Gdańsk and Olimpia Poznań, played from 1995–1996)
- Ostmark Danzig — men's football team (played from 1909–1945)
- Post SG Danzig — men's football team (team for the cities postal workers, played until 1945)
- Preußen Danzig — men's football team (played from 1909–1945)
- SG OrPo Danzig — men's football team (played from 1920–1945)
- KP Sopot – amateur football team (played from 1987–2017)

== Rugby ==
=== Men's ===
- RC Lechia Gdańsk — Rugby union team (13x Polish Champions, 12x Polish Cup winners, formed in 1956)
- Ogniwo Sopot — Rugby union team (11x Polish Champions, 10x Polish Cup winners, formed in 1966)
- RC Arka Gdynia — Rugby union team (4x Polish Champions, 1x Polish Cup winners, formed in 1996)
- AZS-AWFiS Gdańsk — men's Rugby union team (1x Polish Cup winners, played in the Ekstrliga from 1998—2005, formed in 1988)
- RC Lechia Gdańsk 7's — Rugby sevens team (8x Rugby 7's Polish Champions, formed in 1996)

=== Women's ===
- Biało-Zielone Ladies Gdańsk — Rugby sevens team (12x Rugby 7's Polish Champions, formed in 2009)

=== Former teams ===
- RC AZS Politechnika Gdańsk — men's Rugby team (Polish Championship runners-up in 1958, played from 1956–1961)

== Handball ==
=== Men's ===
- Wybrzeże Gdańsk — men's handball team (10x Polish Superliga champions, formed in 1951)

=== Former teams ===
- AZS-AWFiS Gdańsk — men's handball team (played in the Superliga from 2003–06 & 2007–10, dissolved in 2010)
- GTPR Gdynia — women's handball team (2x Superliga champions, played from 1930–2018)
- Nata AZS-AWFiS Gdańsk — women's handball team (Superliga champions in 2004, dissolved in 2017)
- SMS ZPRP Gdańsk — men's handball team (played in the I liga, played from 1997–2021)
- Spójnia Gdynia — men's handball team (played in the Superliga from 2017–19, played from 2011–2019)

== Basketball ==
=== Men's ===
- Arka Gdynia — basketball team (9x Basket Liga champions, 4x Polish Cup winners, 2x Polish SuperCup winners, formed in 1995)
- Trefl Sopot — basketball team (2x Polish Cup winners, 2x Polish SuperCup winners, formed in 2009)

=== Women's ===
- Arka Gdynia — basketball team (13x Basket Liga champions, formed in 1946)

=== Former teams ===
- Wybrzeże Gdańsk — men's basketball team (4x Basket Liga champions)
- Viking Gdynia — men's basketball team (played from 2000–2007)

== Volleyball ==
=== Men's ===
- Trefl Gdańsk — volleyball team (2x Polish Cup winners, 1x Polish SuperCup winners, formed in 2005)

=== Women's ===
- Energa Gedania Gdańsk — volleyball team (3x Polish Champions, now focuses on its youth teams, formed in 1922)

=== Former teams ===
- Atom Trefl Sopot — women's volleyball team (2x Polish Champions, 1x Polish Cup winners, played from 2008—2017)

== Ice Hockey ==
=== Former teams ===
- Stoczniowiec Gdańsk — men's ice hockey team (3x Polish Champions, played from 1953–2012, 2014–2021)
- Hockey Club Gdańsk — men's ice hockey team (played from 2012–2014)
- Pomeranian Hockey Club 2014 — men's ice hockey team (played in the Ekstraliga from 2016–2020, played from 2014–2020)

== Speedway ==
- Wybrzeże Gdańsk — speedway team (formed in 1945)

== American football ==
- Seahawks Gdynia — men's American football team (3x Polish Bowl winners, now based in Gdynia, formed in 2005)

== Sailing ==
- Yacht Club of Poland — (formed in 1924)
- Gryf Marine Yacht Club — (formed in 1928)
