= Poland national rugby union team =

National rugby union team

Poland
- Nicknames: Biało-czerwoni (The White and Reds)
- Emblem: Red poppy
- Union: Polish Rugby Union
- Head coach: Kamil Bobryk
- Captain: Grzegorz Buczek
- Most caps: Stanislaw Więciorek (65)
- Top scorer: Janusz Urbanowicz (205)
- Home stadium: Narodowy Stadion Rugby; Stadion ŁKS; Stadion Widzewa
First colours	Second colours

World Rugby ranking
- Current: 30 (as of 29 September 2025)
- Highest: 25 (2012, 2013)
- Lowest: 42 (2010)

First international
- Poland 9–8 East Germany (Łódź, Poland 24 August 1958)

Biggest win
- Poland 74–0 Norway (Riga, Latvia 24 September 1994)

Biggest defeat
- Portugal 65–3 Poland (Gdańsk, Poland 11 February 2023)
- Website: polskie.rugby

Men's World Rugby Rankings Top 30 as of 28 September 2026
Rank	Change (Note: Change from the previous week)	Team	Points
1	Steady	South Africa	93.09
2	Steady	New Zealand	91.15
3	Steady	Ireland	88.08
4	Steady	France	87.43
5	Steady	England	85.68
6	▲1	Australia	85.55
7	▼1	Scotland	84.78
8	Steady	Argentina	82.24
9	Steady	Japan	77.28
10	Steady	Fiji	76.81
11	Steady	Wales	76.38
12	Steady	Italy	76.30
13	Steady	Georgia	73.94
14	Steady	Portugal	69.39
15	Steady	United States	67.58
16	Steady	Chile	66.94
17	Steady	Spain	66.83
18	Steady	Uruguay	65.75
19	Steady	Tonga	65.14
20	Steady	Samoa	64.73
21	Steady	Romania	62.45
22	Steady	Canada	62.29
23	Steady	Belgium	61.03
24	Steady	Hong Kong	60.74
25	Steady	Zimbabwe	57.68
26	Steady	Namibia	56.96
27	Steady	Netherlands	56.44
28	Steady	Switzerland	55.47
29	Steady	Czech Republic	54.78
30	Steady	Poland	54.54

Poland's historical rankings

Source: World Rugby
Graph updated to 24 August 2026

The Poland national rugby union team, nicknamed The White and Reds, currently compete in the second division of the Rugby Europe International Championships in the Rugby Europe Trophy, a competition which is just below the Rugby Europe Championship where the top six countries in Europe (apart from the teams in the six nations) compete. They are yet to participate in any Rugby World Cup and often play in white with red shorts as well as in red with white shorts.

== History ==
Poland made their international debut against East Germany in 1958 in Łódź, which they won by just one point, 9–8. Later that year they played West Germany in Krasnoyarsk, who defeated them 11–3. The following year they played two matches at Dinamo Stadion in Bucharest, defeating Czechoslovakia and then losing to Romania. Poland continued to contest internationals with these nations over the coming years.

They defeated East Germany in Grimma the 1971, this was followed by strong form from the Polish, winning matches against the Netherlands, Morocco, Czechoslovakia and the Soviet Union. In 1975 Poland played Italy in Treviso, and lost 13–28. In 1977 Poland played a France XV again, and lost 9–26; also that year they played Italy, and lost by only six points, with the final score being 6–12. They played a France XV again in 1978, losing 24–35. They also defeated Spain that year.

Poland played Italy in 1979, losing 3–13, and then played a France XV the following year, though they did not perform as well as previous meetings, losing 42–0. A subsequent match against a France XV in 1981 saw the France XV defeat Poland 49–6. A match between the two sides in 1984 produced a good result for the Polish, losing 19–3. A match against the Italian Barbarians the following year produced the same scoreline.

In 1987 Poland played two Italian teams, the Italian Barbarians and Italy under-21, although they lost to the Barbarians, they won against the under-21 team. Poland did not play at the 1987 World Cup. In 1990 they played the full Italy team in Naples, losing 34–3. Poland did not play in the 1991 World Cup in England. From 1992 to 1993 Poland won six matches in a row. Russia won five to 41 in a following match.

Poland played Italy A, but lost 19–107. Poland also played Romania in 1998, losing 74–13. Poland were grouped in Pool D of round two of the 2007 Rugby World Cup European qualify tournament. Poland performed very well in the pool, winning all four of their games, and finishing at the top of the pool. This saw them through to Pool A of Round three, but they were knocked out here, finishing fourth in the pool.

In the 2021/2022 season, the Polish team secured 2nd place in the Trophy(2nd Division), trailing behind Belgium. This achievement earned Poland a spot in the Championship (1st Division, for the 2023 and 2024 editions.

During the first edition, unfortunately, Poland suffered its largest defeat in history, losing 65–3 against Portugal. In a subsequent game, Poland secured its first historic victory in the Championship by defeating Belgium in Gdańsk, Poland. Despite this milestone, Poland finished 8th, placing last in this edition of the Championship.

Between the two editions, a commemorative friendly match was organized in honor of the Armistice and the Polish National Independence Day, featuring the Polish rugby team and the British Armed Forces team. Held at the National Stadium in Gdańsk, the match concluded with a narrow victory for Poland, 17–14, marking a moment of pride and shared remembrance between the two nations.

In the 2024 edition, they lost all their games and finished 8th once again, which resulted in their relegation to the Trophy (2nd division). This marked the last match for the iconic player of the team, Grzegorz Buczek (as a captain), which took place at the Jean Bouin Stadium of the Stade Français club in Paris, in a ranking match against Belgium.

== Record ==
=== World Cup ===
World Cup record								World Cup Qualification record					
Year	Round	P	W	D	L	F	A	P	W	D	L	F	A
(Australia) (New Zealand) 1987	Not Invited							Not Invited					
(United Kingdom) (Ireland) (France) 1991	did not qualify							3	1	0	2	61	79
(South Africa) 1995	did not qualify							2	1	0	1	28	47
(Wales) 1999	did not qualify							4	1	0	3	58	152
(Australia) 2003	did not qualify							6	5	0	1	177	109
(France) 2007	did not qualify							8	5	0	3	188	180
(New Zealand) 2011	did not qualify							7	3	0	4	94	118
(England) 2015	did not qualify							10	5	0	5	208	183
(Japan) 2019	did not qualify							5	3	0	2	73	73
(France) 2023	did not qualify							Automatically eliminated					
Total	0/9	0	0	0	0	0	0	45	24	0	21	941	862

=== European Competitions Since 2000 ===
Season	Division	G	W	D	L	PF	PA	+/−	Pts	Pos
2000	European Nations Cup Third Division	4	3	0	1	112	69	+43	10	2nd
2000-01	European Nations Cup Second Division	5	4	0	1	105	53	+52	13	1st
2002-04	European Nations Cup Second Division Pool A	8	2	1	5	130	164	-34	13	4th
2006-08	European Nations Cup Second Division 2B	8	7	0	1	266	67	+199	22	1st
2008-10	European Nations Cup Second Division 2A	7	3	0	4	94	118	-24	13	4th
2010-12	European Nations Cup First Division 1B	10	6	1	3	238	189	+49	31	2nd
2012-14	European Nations Cup First Division 1B	10	5	0	5	208	183	+25	22	4th
2014-16	European Nations Cup First Division 1B	10	4	0	6	191	262	-71	18	5th
2016-17	Rugby Europe Trophy	5	3	0	2	73	73	0	12	4th
2017-18	Rugby Europe Trophy	5	1	0	4	106	147	-41	7	5th
2018-19	Rugby Europe Trophy	5	2	0	3	104	164	-60	10	4th
2019-20	Rugby Europe Trophy	5	1	0	4	44	112	-68	5	6th
2021-22*	Rugby Europe Trophy	3	3	0	0	85	65	+20	12	1st

=== Overall ===
Below is a table of the representative rugby matches played by a Poland national XV at test level up until 19 September 2026, updated after match with Czech Republic.

Opponent	Played	Won	Lost	Drawn	% Won
Andorra	5	5	0	0	100%
Belgium	22	13	8	1	59.09%
Bulgaria	1	1	0	0	100%
Croatia	5	4	1	0	80%
Czechoslovakia	22	11	10	1	50%
Czech Republic	17	9	7	1	52.94%
Denmark	6	5	1	0	83.33%
East Germany	21	17	3	1	80.95%
France	1	0	1	0	0%
France A1	2	0	2	0	0%
France XV	6	0	6	0	0%
Georgia	3	2	1	0	66.67%
Georgia XV	1	0	0	1	0%
Germany	13	6	7	0	46.15%
Italy	8	1	7	0	12.5%
Italy A	1	0	1	0	0%
Latvia	5	5	0	0	100%
Lithuania	4	4	0	0	100%
Luxembourg	1	1	0	0	100%
Madagascar	1	0	1	0	0%
Malta	3	3	0	0	100%
Moldova	10	4	5	1	40%
Morocco	13	11	2	0	84.62%
Netherlands	26	14	10	2	53.85%
Norway	1	1	0	0	100%
Portugal	12	3	9	0	25%
Romania	18	1	17	0	5.56%
Romania A	1	0	1	0	0%
Russia	4	0	4	0	0%
Serbia and Montenegro	1	1	0	0	100%
Spain	16	6	10	0	37.5%
Sri Lanka	1	0	1	0	0%
Sweden	18	15	1	2	83.33%
Switzerland	7	4	3	0	57.14%
Tunisia	7	3	4	0	66.67%
Ukraine	14	3	11	0	21.43%
Soviet Union	20	2	18	0	10%
West Germany	10	6	4	0	60%
Yugoslavia	2	0	2	0	0%
Total	329	161	159	9	48.94%

== Recent Matches ==
Matches

9 October 2021
12:50 EEST (UTC +3)

(1 LBP) Ukraine	24–27	Poland
	Report

Yunist Stadion, Lviv
Attendance: 2,000
Referee: John Catteau (Belgium)

13 November 2021
13:00 CET (UTC+01)

Poland	21–16	Germany (1 LBP)
	Report

Narodowy Stadion Rugby, Gdynia
Referee: Saba Abulashvili (Georgia)

20 November 2021
14:30 CET (UTC+01)

Poland	37–25	Switzerland
Try: Cooke 7'; Haznar 33'; Zeszutek 75'; Con: Piotrowicz 34', 75'; Pen: Piotrowicz 4', 17', 30', 57', 62', 71'	Report	Try: Rohrig 24'; Vial 38'; Roberson 80'; Con: Porcher 24', 39'; Pen: Porcher 53', 68'

Stadion Miejski, Warsaw
Referee: Eki Fanlo (Spain)

== Current squad ==
The following players were selected for the 2021–22 Rugby Europe Trophy match against Switzerland on 20 November 2021.

Head Coach: (Wales) Christian Hitt

Caps updated: 22 November 2021, after match with Switzerland.

Note: Flags indicate national union for the club/province as defined by World Rugby.

Player	Position	Date of birth (age)	Caps	Club/province
Kamil Bobryk	Hooker	9 February 1984 (age 42)	48	(France) CS Vienne
Grzegorz Buczek	Hooker	17 May 1986 (age 40)	22	(Poland) RC Lechia Gdańsk
Thomas Fidler	Prop	22 October 1986 (age 40)	7	(Poland) Ogniwo Sopot
Radosław Bysewski	Prop	3 December 1993 (age 32)	25	(Poland) Ogniwo Sopot
Quentin Cieslinski	Prop	28 June 1997 (age 29)	2	(France) ASV Lavaur
Sylwester Gąska	Prop	22 February 2002 (age 24)	4	(Poland) Ogniwo Sopot
Edward Krawiecki	Lock	1 January 1995 (age 31)	7	(England) Bromsgrove RFC
Mateusz Bartoszek	Lock	20 January 1990 (age 36)	38	(France) RC Bassin d'Arcachon
Krystian Olejek	Lock	28 November 1995 (age 30)	3	(Poland) Pogoń Siedlce
Michał Krużycki	Lock	28 November 2000 (age 25)	33	(Poland) RC Lechia Gdańsk
Jan Cal	Back row	8 November 1995 (age 30)	6	(Poland) Skra Warsaw
Dawid Rubaśniak	Back row	3 September 2000 (age 26)	5	(Wales) Ebbw Vale
Piotr Zeszutek (c)	Back row	31 January 1991 (age 35)	27	(Poland) Ogniwo Sopot
Dawid Plichta	Scrum-half	26 January 1992 (age 34)	20	(Poland) Orkan Sochaczew
Mateusz Plichta	Scrum-half	4 September 1997 (age 29)	16	(Poland) Ogniwo Sopot
Wojciech Piotrowicz	Fly-half	23 March 1990 (age 36)	18	(Poland) Ogniwo Sopot
Daniel Gdula	Centre	8 January 2001 (age 25)	18	(Poland) RC Posnania
Michal Haznar	Centre	17 January 1994 (age 32)	2	(South Africa) Griquas
Siokivaha Taufui Halaifuana	Centre	28 November 2000 (age 25)	3	(Poland) Skra Warsaw
Ross Cooke	Wing	1 January 2000 (age 26)	7	(England) Tynedale RFC
Stasio Maltby	Wing	28 November 1998 (age 27)	4	(England) Brighton Blues
Krystian Pogorzelski	Fullback	3 October 1996 (age 30)	10	(Poland) Master Pharm Rugby Łódź
Patryk Reksulak	Fullback	25 February 1998 (age 28)	15	(Poland) Master Pharm Rugby Łódź

=== Recent call-ups ===
The following players have also been called up to the squad within the last 12 months.

Player	Pos	Date of birth (age)	Caps	Club	Latest call-up
Michał Gadomski	Prop	28 November 1995 (age 30)	2	(Poland) Orkan Sochaczew	v. Germany, 13 November 2021
Marcin Siemaszko	Prop	28 November 1997 (age 28)	2	(Poland) Juvenia Kraków	v. Germany, 13 November 2021
Adam Piotrowski	Lock	22 April 1997 (age 29)		(Poland) Ogniwo Sopot	v. Ukraine, 9 October 2021
Jakub Małecki	Lock	29 October 1995 (age 31)	1	(Wales) Burry Port RFC	v. Germany, 13 November 2021
Jędrek Nowicki	Fly half	4 June 1999 (age 27)		(France) CA Pontarlier	v. Ukraine, 9 October 2021
Szymon Sirocki	Wing	4 April 2000 (age 26)	16	(Poland) RC Arka Gdynia	v. Germany, 13 November 2021
Artur Fursenko		8 January 2001 (age 25)		(Poland) Orkan Sochaczew	v. Ukraine, 9 October 2021

== Current coaching staff ==
The current coaching staff of the Polish national team:

Name	Nationality	Role
Maja Lindner	POL	Manager
Kamil Bobryk	POL	Head coach
Tomasz Stępień	POL	Assistant coach
Dr Bartosz Chudzik	POL	Team doctor
Karol Turlo	POL	Physiotherapist

== Former coaches ==
- Marian Bondarowicz (1958–1969)
- Eugeniusz Rogatka (1959–1960)
- Marian Bondarowicz (1960–1961)
- Jan Frankowski (1961)
- Marian Bondarowicz (1962)
- Józef Koter (1963)
- Józef Grochowski (1964)
- Franciszek Nowak (1965)
- Józef Sokołowski (1965–1968)
- Zbigniew Janus (1969–1970)
- Józef Sokołowski (1970)
- Józef Grochowski (1971–1975)
- Józef Sokołowski (1975)
- Ryszard Wiejski (1976–1989)
- Andrzej Kopyt (1990)
- Zdzisław Szczybelski (1990–1991)
- Andrzej Kopyt (1991–1994)
- Ryszard Wiejski & Maciej Powała-Niedźwiecki (1994–1995)
- Maciej Powała-Niedźwiecki (1995–2000)
- Jerzy Jumas (2000–2006)
- Tomasz Putra (2006–2013)
- Marek Płonka (2013–2016)
- Blikkies Groenewald (2016–2017)
- Stanislaw Więciorek (2017–2018)
- (Ireland) Duaine Lindsay (2018–2020)
- (Wales) Christian Hitt (2021–2024)
- Kamil Bobryk (2021–)

== See also ==
- Rugby union in Poland
- Polski Związek Rugby
- Poland national rugby sevens team
- Poland women's national rugby sevens team
- Sport in Poland
