= Lechia (disambiguation) =

Lechia is the historical and/or alternative name of Poland.

== Current use ==
Other uses of the name Lechia are;

In sports:

- Men's football;
  - Lechia Gdańsk, Polish football club based in Gdańsk. Formed in 1945.
  - Lechia Lwów, the first ever Polish professional football club. Formed in 1903, disbanded in 1939.
  - Lechia Zielona Góra, Polish football club based in Zielona Góra. Formed in 1946, disbanded in 2015. Reformed in 2019.
  - Lechia Dzierżoniów, Polish football club based in Dzierżoniów. Formed in 1945.
  - Lechia 06 Mysłowice, Polish football club based in Mysłowice. Formed in 1906.
  - Lechia Kostrzyn, Polish football club based in Kostrzyn. Formed in 1922.
  - Lechia Tomaszów Mazowiecki, Polish football club based in Tomaszów Mazowiecki. Formed in 1923.
  - Lechia Piechowice, Polish football club based in Piechowice. Formed in 1946.
  - Lechia Rokitnica, Polish football club based in Rokitnica. Formed in 1958.
  - Olimpia-Lechia Gdańsk, former Polish football club created by a merger between Lechia Gdańsk and Olimpia Poznań. Formed in 1995, disbanded in 1996.
  - Lechia-Polonia Gdańsk, former Polish football club created by a merger between Lechia Gdańsk and Polonia Gdańsk. Formed in 1998, disbanded in 2002.
- Women's football;
  - Lechia Gdańsk Ladies, Polish football club based in Gdańsk. Formed in 2019.
- Rugby;
  - RC Lechia Gdańsk, Polish rugby union club based in Gdańsk. Formed in 1956.
- Athletics;
  - KL Lechia Gdańsk, Polish athletics club based in Gdańsk. Formed in 1945.
- Cycling;
  - KK Lechia Gdańsk, Polish cycling club based in Gdańsk.
- Sports clubs;
  - Lechia Gdańsk (sports club), formed in 1945 it is a Polish multi-sports club based in Gdańsk.
  - Lechia Kielce (1920–1948), the first Polish multi-sports club of its name, based in Kielce.
  - Lechia Kielce (1955–1988), the second Polish multi-sports club of its name, despite its name it was not associated with the first sports club known as Lechia Kielce.

Animals:

- Lechia (spider) is a genus of jumping spiders (family Salticidae).

Other:

- Lechia is the name of an academic corporation based in Poznań. First formed in 1920 it is mainly used by students from PUEB and UAM.

== Former uses ==
- Sports
  - Biało-Zielone Ladies Gdańsk, is a Polish rugby sevens club based in Gdańsk. Formed in 2009 it was known as “RC Ladies Lechia Gdańsk” from 2009 to 2015.
  - AP Orlen Gdańsk, is a Polish footballing academy, most noted for its ladies team, based in Gdańsk. Formed in 2010 it was known as “Akademia Piłkarska Lechia Gdańsk” from 2010 to 2020.
- Other
  - Lechia is a name that was often used by a cosmetic company based in Poznań before Nivea took over the factory in 2006.

== See also ==
- Lech, Czech and Rus, Polish legend
- Lechitic languages, central Europe
