= Polish Rugby Union =

Rugby union

Polski Związek Rugby
- Sport: Rugby union
- Founded: 9 September 1957; 69 years ago
- World Rugby affiliation: March 1988
- Rugby Europe affiliation: 23 September 1957
- President: Jarosław Prasał
- Men's coach: (Poland) Kamil Bobryk
- Sevens coach: Chris Davies
- Website: polskie.rugby

Polish Rugby Union (Polish: Polski Związek Rugby), abbreviated to PZR, is the only legal Polish representative of Polish rugby union and rugby sevens for both men and women's rugby and all age groups.

== History ==
The Polish Rugby Union (Polski Związek Rugby) was founded in 1957, although rugby had already existed in Poland since the 1920s, when in 1921, Louis Amblard, a Frenchman, set up the first Polish rugby club called "The White Eagles". The first match was in 1922, and the first club international in 1924 against a Romanian side. There was, however, an earlier Polish Rugby Union set up in the early 1920s, but disbanded in 1928, as the sport failed to gain much popularity and historical disruptions such as World War II and Molotov–Ribbentrop Pact halted development, which why it was not until the 1950s that the sport re-emerged. Poland's first ever rugby season was in 1956 between September and December. There was no national league but only 5 regional divisions which were meant to determine who shall play in the top flight which was to be established later on. PZR joined the IRFB in 1988. The official supplier of equipment to the PRU is O'Brien sport.

In 1921, Louis Amblard, a Frenchman, set up the first Polish rugby club called "The White Eagles". The first match was in 1922, and the first club international in 1924 against a Romanian side.

The game became established in the Warsaw Military Academy in the early 1930s.

The tragic events of World War II, the Molotov–Ribbentrop Pact etc., meant that the growth of Polish rugby was retarded until the 1950s. During World War II, there were occasional games between allied POWs in German camps in Poland. For example, a game was held between a Scottish and a Welsh XV, in ten inches of snow. No conversions were allowed, as the ball would have gone over the camp fence, and the game was twenty minutes each way. Players wore army boots, trousers, prison shirts and balaclavas.

Polish rugby arguably achieved its greatest success in the late 1970s when the national team beat Italy, Spain and the USSR, and also held Romania to a 37–21 win in 1977.

"Much to everyone's surprise, Eastern Bloc countries are among the game's vigorous participants, seemingly oblivious to rugby's capitalist class-ridden origins. Russia emerged from behind the Iron Curtain and came under international scrutiny when they played France in Toulouse in November 1978. Rumania, Poland and Czechoslovakia are members of the Federation Internationale de Rugby Amateur, the governing body for those countries not in the IB."

In 1983, Poland failed to play Italy in the FIRA Championships, and told FIRA that two of their players had died. It is not known where the other died, but one had died near Bucharest.

The Cold War frequently intruded – for example in the 1984 FIRA Championships, in the game against France, Poland demanded the removal of the French players Didier Camberabero, Henri Sanz and the Brive RFC centre Yves Fouget, because as members of the French armed forces, they were considered to be a security risk.

Because of high Polish emigration, particularly to France, and English speaking nations, the Polish team actually has a fairly large pool of potential players. In addition, a number of Poles returning from jobs in the British Isles and France, have carried the game back with them.

There are currently three divisions in Poland. The second division was relaunched in 2009 using some of the major teams providing 2nd XVs, along with some newly formed sides. The top division has 8 teams while the second division has 6 teams. Prior to that in 2008/2009 there were 10 teams in the top division and only 4 in the second. This led to some very uneven contests between the top teams and those at the bottom of the league. There is now also a regional league played in the centre of Poland (around Lodz and Warsaw) in which some smaller clubs have entered teams and second teams from some of the top clubs nationally compete.

Polish rugby development, however, has tended to concentrate on rugby sevens as a means of introducing the sport to people. The PRU organises regular one day sevens tournaments over the spring/summer with teams travelling from all over the country. There are teams forming all over the country, but there is a shortage of quality coaching and basic equipment. Despite this rugby is making good headway.

Rugby tens also has some popularity.

== International ==
The PZR governs currently several senior Polish rugby teams. The most notable is the Poland national rugby union team, however there is also a Poland women's national rugby union team. There are also both men's and women's rugby sevens national teams.

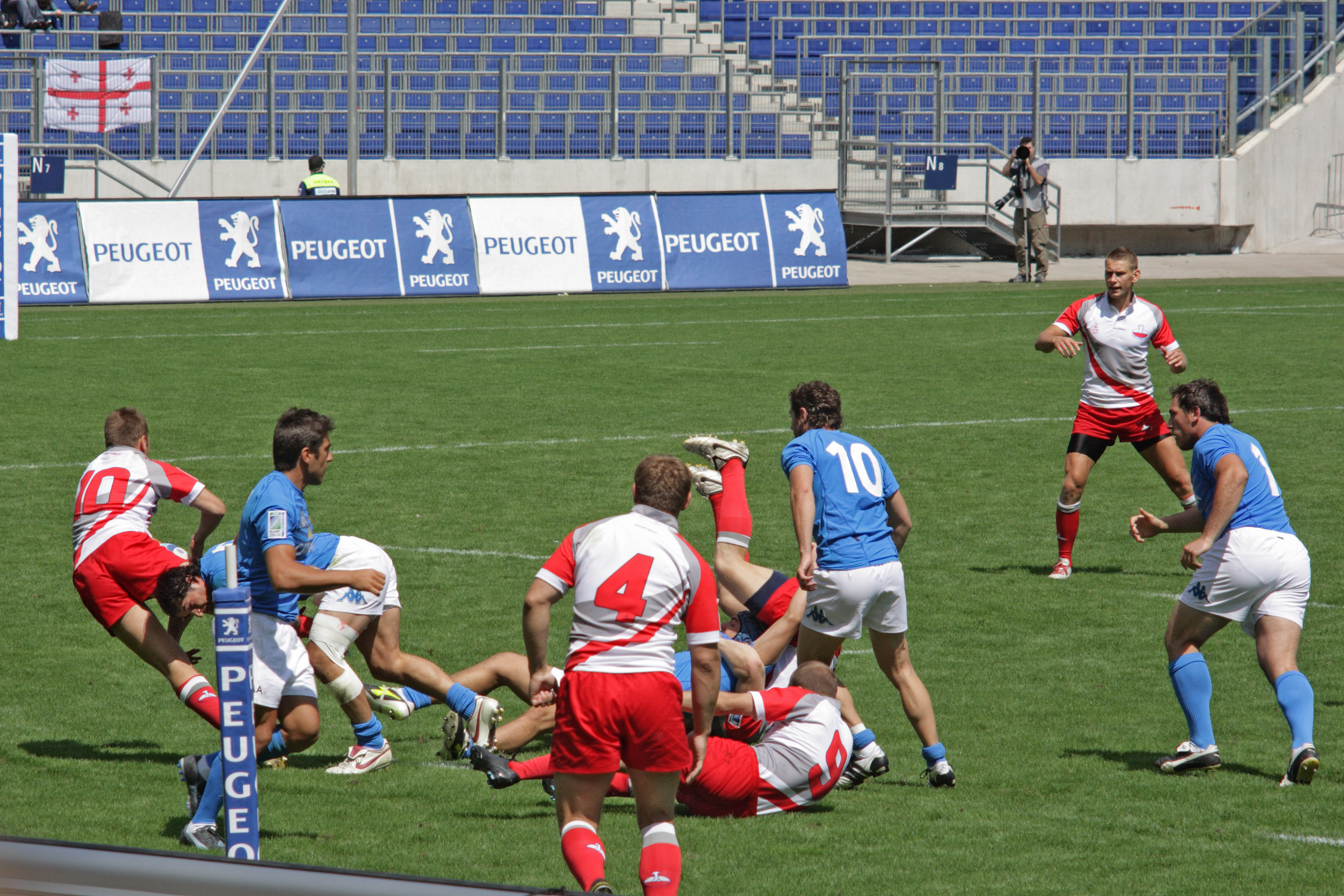
Italy vs Poland, 2008 European Rugby Sevens

Poland's international debut was in 1958 against East Germany, and they won the match 9–8.

They compete in the second division competition Rugby Europe Trophy, where the winner is promoted to the Premier Division Rugby Europe Championship. In 2018, Poland competed against Portugal, Netherlands, Czech Republic, Switzerland, and Maldova.

In 2018, the Polish XV Men's team was ranked 35 in the world. They also compete in the VII's Europe Grand Prix 7s Series.

Women's Polish Rugby compete in the Women's 7s GPS, where they play other European countries, such as Ireland, Wales, Scotland, Italy, France, Russia and Germany

== Men's Rugby ==
The PZR governs the 3 domestic national divisions. The second division was relaunched in 2009 using some of the major teams providing 2nd XVs, along with some newly formed sides. The top division has 8 teams while the second division has 6 teams. Prior to that in 2008/2009 there were 10 teams in the top division and only 4 in the second. This led to some very uneven contests between the top teams and those at the bottom of the league. There are now also regional leagues in which some smaller clubs have entered teams and second teams from some of the top clubs which compete nationally.

The current league system has been in place since 2011/2012.

=== XV Rugby ===
==== Tier 1 – Extraliga ====
Rugby Ekstraliga Teams

- Ogniwo Sopot
- Skra Warszawa
- Juvenia Kraków
- Budowlani Łódź
- Lechia Gdańsk
- Pogoń Siedlce
- Arka Gdynia
- Budowlani Lublin
- Orkan Sochaczew
- Sparta Jarocin

==== Tier 2 – Liga I ====
I liga Teams

- Sparta Jarocin
- AZS AWF Warszawa
- Rugby Białystok
- Zielona Góra
- Miedzi Lubin
- Legia Warszawa

==== Tier 3 – Liga II ====
II liga Rugby Teams

- RC Posnania
- Ark Rumia
- Alfa Bydgoszcz
- Mazovia Minsk Mazowiecki
- Rugby Ruda Śląska

=== Seven's Rugby ===
Polish rugby development, has tended to concentrate on rugby sevens as a means of introducing the sport to people. The PRU organises regular one day sevens tournaments over the spring/summer with teams travelling from all over the country. There are teams forming all over the country, but there is a shortage of quality coaching and basic equipment. Despite this rugby sevens is making good headway, and the national team regularly competes in tournaments.

Rugby tens also has some popularity,

Seven's Teams

- Posnania Poznań
- Lechia Gdańsk
- GTR Tytan Gniezno
- Juvenia Kraków
- RC Orkan Sochaczew
- AZS AWFiS Gdańsk
- Rugby Bełchatów
- Werewolves Wąbrzeźno
- Rugby Team Olsztyn
- Kaskada Szczecin
- Szarża Grudziądz
- Budowlani Łódź SA
- KS Budowlani Łódź

== Women's rugby ==
Poland has been playing international sevens rugby since 2005. On 1 March 2026, Poland played their first fifteens test match against the Czech Republic at the Burloch Arena in Ruda Śląska, Poland. They are currently ranked 40th on World Rugby's rankings as of 2 March 2026.

=== Seven's Rugby ===
Teams

- Biało-Zielone Ladies Gdańsk
- Black Roses Posnania Poznań
- Legia Warszawa
- Juvenia Kraków
- AZS AWF Warszawa
- Legia II Warszawa
- Miedziowe Lubin
- KS Rugby Gierzwałd
- Flota Gdynia
- Diablice Ruda Śląska
- Tygrysice Orkan Sochaczew

== Youth and Children rugby ==
Poland rugby has a youth tournament for different age groups.

=== XV and Seven's Rugby ===
Teams

- UKS Piątka Wilda Poznań
- KS BBRC Łódź
- UKS Karb przy MDK 2 Bytom
- UKS Cisowa Arka Gdynia
- UKS Dziesiątka Gdynia
- UKS Gorce Raba Niżna
- SP Grodysławice
- Hegemon Akademia Rugby
- UKS Kadet Rachanie
- UKS Koziołki Jerzykowo-Biskupice
- UKS Rugby Lubień
- KS Marlin Ozorków
- Miejski Klub Rugby Siedlce
- KR Owal Leszno
- UKS Osiemdziesiątka Sochaczew
- UKS Rugby Czeczewo
- Rugby Gorzów Wielkopolski
- UKS Strzałka
- SP Wożuczyn
- UKS Żaczek Michalów

== Regional bodies ==
The PZR is divided into 6 regional governing bodies, each with their own president:

- Masovian: Warszawsko - Mazowiecki Okręgowy Związek Rugby - Andrzej Suliga
- Pomerania: Pomorski Okręgowy Związek Rugby – Przemysław Szablewski
- Warmia-Masuria: Warmińsko-Mazurski Okręgowy Związek Rugby – Henryk Pach
- Greater Poland: Wielkopolski Okręgowy Związek Rugby – Roman Augustyniak
- Lubelian: Lubelski Okręgowy Związek Rugby – Wiesław Piotrowicz
- Silesia: Śląski Okręgowy Związek Rugby – Teresa Jarczyk
- Lesser Poland: Małopolski Okręgowy Związek Rugby – Dariusz Grzyb

== See also ==
- Rugby union in Poland
- Poland national rugby union team
- Poland national rugby sevens team
- Poland women's national rugby sevens team
- Ekstraliga
