= Ekstraliga (rugby union) =

Rugby union competition in Poland

Ekstraliga Rugby
- Current season, competition or edition: 2026-27 Ekstraliga (rugby union)
- Sport: Rugby union
- Founded: 1957; 69 years ago
- First season: 1957; 69 years ago
- Administrator: Polish Rugby Union
- No. of teams: 10
- Country: Poland
- Most recent champion: Pogoń Siedlce (2nd title) (2025-26)
- Most titles: AZS-AWF Warsaw (16 titles)
- Broadcaster: TVP Sport
- Relegation to: I Liga
- Website: https://polskie.rugby/

Rugby Ekstraliga (Polish: Ekstraliga Polska w rugby union) is a Polish rugby union competition, consisting of 10 clubs, and is the top division of the Polish rugby union system.

The competition takes place cyclically (every season, from autumn to spring) in a circular system as the national championship and is intended for the best Polish rugby clubs. They are organized by the Polish Rugby Union. The winner of the Ekstraliga final is also the Polish champion, and the weakest team plays in a relegation play-off against the winner of the I Liga (formerly II Liga). The current champions are Pogoń Siedlce.

Formerly used logo.

== Champions ==
Season	Champions	Runners	Third
1957	AZS-AWF Warsaw	Czarni Bytom	Górnik Kochłowice
1958	AZS-AWF Warsaw	AZS Gdańsk	Czarni Bytom
1959	Czarni Bytom	AZS-AWF Warsaw	Włókniarz Łódź
1960	Lechia Gdańsk	Czarni Bytom	AZS-AWF Warsaw
1961	Lechia Gdańsk	AZS-AWF Warsaw	Czarni Bytom
1962	AZS-AWF Warsaw	Posnania	Lechia Gdańsk
1963	AZS-AWF Warsaw	Lechia Gdańsk	Posnania
1964	Skra Warsaw	AZS-AWF Warsaw	Czarni Bytom
1965	Skra Warsaw	AZS-AWF Warsaw	Czarni Bytom
1966	Skra Warsaw	Orzeł Warszawa	Czarni Bytom
1967	Skra Warsaw	Orzeł Warszawa	Lechia Gdańsk
1968	Skra Warsaw	Orzeł Warszawa	Lechia Gdańsk
1969	Skra Warsaw	Spójnia Gdańsk	Lechia Gdańsk
1970	Lechia Gdańsk	Orzeł Warszawa	Skra Warsaw
1971	Polonia Poznań	Lechia Gdańsk	AZS-AWF Warsaw
1972	AZS-AWF Warsaw	Lechia Gdańsk	Skra Warsaw
1973	AZS-AWF Warsaw	Lechia Gdańsk	Polonia Poznań
1974	Polonia Poznań	AZS-AWF Warsaw	Lechia Gdańsk
1975	Polonia Poznań	AZS-AWF Warsaw	Skra Warsaw
1976	Polonia Poznań	Skra Warsaw	AZS-AWF Warsaw
1977	AZS-AWF Warsaw	Polonia Poznań	Lechia Gdańsk
1978	Polonia Poznań	Skra Warsaw	AZS-AWF Warsaw
1979	AZS-AWF Warsaw	Budowlani Łódź	Skra Warsaw
1980	AZS-AWF Warsaw	Polonia Poznań	Skra Warsaw
1981	AZS-AWF Warsaw	Skra Warsaw	Lechia Gdańsk
1982	AZS-AWF Warsaw	Lechia Gdańsk	Budowlani Łódź
1983	Budowlani Łódź	AZS-AWF Warsaw	Posnania
1984	AZS-AWF Warsaw	Budowlani Łódź	Orkan Sochaczew
1985	AZS-AWF Warsaw	Lechia Gdańsk	Budowlani Łódź
1986	AZS-AWF Warsaw	Lechia Gdańsk	Ogniwo Sopot
1987	Ogniwo Sopot	AZS-AWF Warsaw	Lechia Gdańsk
1988	AZS-AWF Warsaw	Ogniwo Sopot	Lechia Gdańsk
1989	Ogniwo Sopot	Śląsk Ruda Śląska	Budowlani Łódź
1990	Ogniwo Sopot	Budowlani Lublin	Budowlani Łódź
1991	Ogniwo Sopot	Lechia Gdańsk	Budowlani Lublin
1992	Ogniwo Sopot	Budowlani Lublin	Budowlani Łódź
1993	Ogniwo Sopot	Lechia Gdańsk	Budowlani Lublin
1994	Lechia Gdańsk	Ogniwo Sopot	AZS-AWF Warsaw
1995	Lechia Gdańsk	Ogniwo Sopot	AZS-AWF Warsaw
1996	Lechia Gdańsk	Ogniwo Sopot	AZS-AWF Warsaw
1997	Ogniwo Sopot	Lechia Gdańsk	AZS-AWF Warsaw
1998	Lechia Gdańsk	Ogniwo Sopot	AZS-AWF Warsaw
1999	Ogniwo Sopot	Arka Gdynia	Lechia Gdańsk
2000	Lechia Gdańsk	Arka Gdynia	Dębica-Lincer Pruszcz Gdański
2001	Lechia Gdańsk	Ogniwo Sopot	Arka Gdynia
2002	Lechia Gdańsk	Arka Gdynia	Ogniwo Sopot
2003	Ogniwo Sopot	Budowlani Łódź	Budowlani Lublin
2004	Arka Gdynia	Budowlani Łódź	Lechia Gdańsk
2005	Arka Gdynia	Budowlani Łódź	Posnania
2006	Budowlani Łódź	AZS-AWF Warsaw	Posnania
2007	Budowlani Łódź	Arka Gdynia	AZS-AWF Warsaw
2008	AZS-AWF Warsaw	Budowlani Łódź	Arka Gdynia/Lechia Gdańsk
2009	Budowlani Łódź	Arka Gdynia	Juvenia Kraków/Lechia Gdańsk
2010	Budowlani Łódź	Lechia Gdańsk	Arka Gdynia/Orkan Sochaczew
2011	Arka Gdynia	Budowlani Łódź	Lechia Gdańsk
2012	Lechia Gdańsk	Budowlani Łódź	Arka Gdynia
2013	Lechia Gdańsk	Arka Gdynia	Budowlani Łódź
2014	Lechia Gdańsk	Pogoń Siedlce	Arka Gdynia
2015	Arka Gdynia	Budowlani Łódź SA	Lechia Gdańsk
2016	Budowlani Łódź SA	Lechia Gdańsk	Ogniwo Sopot
2017	Budowlani Łódź SA	Ogniwo Sopot	Pogoń Siedlce
2018	Budowlani Łódź SA	Ogniwo Sopot	Pogoń Siedlce
2019	Ogniwo Sopot	Budowlani Łódź SA	Pogoń Siedlce
2019–20	Season cancelled due to the COVID-19 pandemic		
2020–21	Ogniwo Sopot	Budowlani Łódź SA	Orkan Sochaczew
2021–22	Orkan Sochaczew	Ogniwo Sopot	Skra Warsaw
2022–23	Budo 2011 Aleksandrów Łódzki	Ogniwo Sopot	Orkan Sochaczew
2023–24	Orkan Sochaczew	Ogniwo Sopot	Pogoń Siedlce
2024–25	Pogoń Siedlce	Orkan Sochaczew	Ogniwo Sopot
2025–26	Pogoń Siedlce	Ogniwo Sopot	Orkan Sochaczew

== 2024–25 clubs ==
Team	Stadium (capacity)	City
Arka Gdynia	National Rugby Stadium (2,425)	Gdynia
Budowlani Lublin	Stadium on Krasińskiego 11	Lublin
Budowlani Łódź	ŁKS Stadium on Unii Lubelskiej 2	Łódź
Juvenia Kraków	Juvenia Stadium on Na Błoniach 7 (800)	Kraków
Lechia Gdańsk	MOSiR Stadium on Grunwaldzka 244 (11,811)	Gdańsk
Ogniwo Sopot	Stadium on Jana z Kolna 18 (3,000)	Sopot
Orkan Sochaczew	Stadium on Warszawska 80 (3,000)	Sochaczew
Pogoń Siedlce	Stadium on Jana Pawła II 6 (3,500)	Siedlce
Rugby Białystok	Municipal Stadium side pitch	Białystok

== See also ==
- Poland national rugby union team
- Rugby union in Poland
