= Stanisław Więciorek =

Poland international rugby union player

- Born: April 10, 1965 (age 61) Lublin, Poland
- Height: 1.85 m (6 ft 1 in)
- Weight: 103 kg (227 lb)

Rugby union career
- Position: Prop
Senior career
Years	Team	Apps	(Points)
1981–1987	Budowlani Lublin		
1987–1988	AZS-AWF Warsaw		
1988–1990	SA Vierzon	23	(84)
1990–1992	RC Istres		
1992–1994	Budowlani Lublin		
1994–1995	Lechia Gdańsk		
1996	Budowlani Lublin		
1997–2001	Lechia Gdańsk		
2001–2002	Budowlani Lublin		
2003–2005	Lechia Gdańsk		
2005	Budowlani Lublin		
2006	Posnania Poznań		
2006–2009	Lechia Gdańsk	8	(45)
International career
Years	Team	Apps	(Points)
1987–2007	Poland	65	(103)

Stanislaw Więciorek (born 10 April 1965) is a former Polish international rugby union player. He had played for 13 clubs throughout his rugby career including two French clubs (SA Vierzon and RC Istres).

== Career ==
Więciorek is Poland's most capped international having earned 65 caps for his country. He made his international debut back in 1987 and retired from international rugby in 2007. He continued to play at club level until 2009.

== Coaching ==
He is currently coaching Pogoń Aventa Siedlce in Poland.
