= Lechia Gdańsk (sports club) =

Former multi-sports club based in Gdańsk, Poland

- Full name: Lechia Gdańsk
- Nickname: Lechia
- Founded: 7 August 1945
- Dissolved: 2002

Lechia Gdańsk was a Polish multi-sports club based in Gdańsk, Poland. Formed in 1945 the club held many different sections until 2002 when the teams started to operate as their own organisations. While run as their own organisations now, many of the teams that were part of the singular sports club often still hold the name Lechia.

== Overview ==
=== Football (men's first team) ===
Men's football: Lechia Gdańsk - formed 1945

The most well known and supported section of the sports club has been the men's football team.

Honours:

Ekstraklasa - Third place (2): 1956, 2018–19

Polish Cup - Winners (2): 1982–83, 2018–19
Runners-up (2): 1955, 2019–20

Polish Super Cup - Winners (2): 1983, 2019

=== Football (men's second team) ===
Men's football: KS Lechia Gdańsk II (second team) - formed 1953

The second team for Lechia Gdańsk which is mostly used as to develop players from the academy and to assess who is ready to play in the first team.

III liga - Runners-up: 2014–15

IV liga - Winners: 2009–10
Runners-up: 2008–09

=== Woman's football ===
Woman's football: Lechia Gdańsk Ladies - formed 2019

The team were created in 2014 as Biało-Zielone Lechia Gdańsk and focused on football training for girls in youth teams. Biało-Zielone Gdańsk was closely linked with AP Lotos Gdańsk and Lechia Gdańsk in its early years. Since 2019 it been associated with the men's football team and took the name Lechia Gdańsk Ladies.

=== Men's rugby union ===
Men's rugby union: RC Lechia Gdańsk - formed 1956

The men's rugby team is the most successful section of the sports club. The club is the only in Poland to have never been relegated from the top division, and is the second most successful team in Poland's rugby history.

Honours:

Ekstraliga - Winners (13): 1960, 1961, 1970, 1994, 1995, 1996, 1998, 1999–00, 2000–01, 2001–02, 2011–12, 2012–13, 2013–14
Runners-up (11): 1963, 1971–72, 1972–73, 1981–82, 1985, 1986, 1991, 1993, 1997, 2009–10, 2015–16
Third place (15): 1962, 1967, 1968, 1969, 1973–74, 1976–77, 1980–81, 1987, 1988, 1998–99, 2003–04, 2007–08, 2008–09, 2010–11, 2014–15

Polish Cup: - Winners (12): 1977, 1984, 1985, 1986, 1994, 1996, 1997, 2004, 2005, 2006, 2008, 2013

=== Men's rugby sevens ===
Men's rugby sevens: RC Lechia Gdańsk - formed 1996

A section of the main Lechia Gdańsk rugby club. The Lechia rugby sevens team is the joint most successful rugby sevens team in Poland.

Honours: (rugby sevens)

Polish Sevens Championship - Winners (8): 2010, 2011, 2012, 2013, 2014, 2015, 2016, 2018
Runners-up (2): 2009, 2017
Third place (3): 1996, 1997, 2021–22

=== Women's rugby sevens ===
Women's rugby sevens: Biało-Zielone Ladies Gdańsk - formed 2009 (not associated with the Lechia name since 2015)

The women's rugby sevens section was created in 2009 as RC Ladies Lechia Gdańsk in close connection with the men's team and other Lechia clubs. The section is the most successful in Poland's women's rugby sevens. The team separated from Lechia rugby in 2015 and became Biało-Zielone Ladies Gdańsk.

Honours:

Polish Women's Sevens Championship - Winners (12): 2011, 2012, 2013, 2013–14, 2014–15, 2015–16, 2016–17, 2017–18, 2018–19, 2019–20, 2020–21, 2021–22
Runners-up: 2010
Third place: 2009

Polish Cup - Winners (5): 2011, 2016, 2017, 2018, 2019

=== Cycling ===
Cycling club: Klub Kolarski Lechia Gdańsk.

The cycling team was most successful during the 1950‘s and early 1960’s, notably winning the Tour de Pologne twice. The cycling section runs more as a club now and doesn’t take part in major cycling events.

Famous former riders include: Henryk Kowalski and Michał Bogdziewicz.

Honours: (team)

Tour de Pologne – Overall classification (2): 1957, 1961
Stage wins: 1 (1959)

Polish Mountain Bike Championship; – Elite classification runners-up: 2003
Marathon classification winners: 2003

Honours: (cyclist)

Henryk Kowalski – Tour de Pologne overall classification (2): 1957, 1961
Stage wins: Stage 1 (1959)

Michał Bogdziewicz – Polish Mountain Bike Championships ‘Elite’ classification runner-up: 2003
Polish Mountain Bike Championship Marathon classification: 2003

=== Athletics ===
Athletics club: Klub Lekkoatletyczny Lechia Gdańsk - formed 1945

The athletics club was created in 1945 and provided a way for the inhabitants of Gdańsk with better sporting opportunities. Athletes from KL Lechia Gdańsk have taken part in both the Olympics and World Championships.

Honours:

Lechia athletes have achieved results in the following sporting competitions;

Olympics - Bronze medal: 1960 Summer Olympics, Kazimierz Zimny (5000m)
4th place: 1948 Summer Olympics, Mieczysław Łomowski (shot put)
9th place: 1980 Summer Olympics, Bernadetta Blechacz (javelin)
11th place: 1992 Summer Olympics, Katarzyna Radtke (racewalking 10k)

=== Smaller sections ===
The Lechia Gdańsk sports club also included the following sections:

Basketball club: Baltia Gdańsk - formed 1945, dissolved 1946. The club was formed in 1945 when the sports club used the name Baltia and was dissolved before the sports club started to use the name Lechia later that year.

Boxing club: KS BOP Boks/Boks Lechia Gdańsk formed 1945, dissolved 1952. Formed in 1945 the club was dissolved a few months later. In January 1948 the section was reactivated before dissolving again in 1952 due to the merging of multiple boxing clubs in the Gdańsk area.

Hockey clubs: in its early years the Lechia sports club had sections for both field and ice hockey.

Tennis club: Gdańskie Towarzystwo Tenisowe Lechia Gdańsk.

Volleyball club: formed 1945, dissolved 1946.

Weightlifting club: part of KL Lechia Gdańsk.

Lechia Gdańsk also included clubs in handball, skiing, shooting, swimming, chess, table tennis, wrestling, and sailing.

== Sections list ==
A list of all known teams and clubs that have played under the Lechia name.

- Men's football team: Lechia Gdańsk (1945–present)
- Woman's football team: Lechia Gdańsk Ladies (2019–present)
- Men's rugby team: RC Lechia Gdańsk (1956–present)
- Women's rugby sevens team: Biało-Zielone Ladies Gdańsk (2009–present)
- Athletics club: KL Lechia Gdańsk (Athletics) (1945–present)
- Men's basketball: Baltia Gdańsk (1945–46)
- Men's boxing club: KS BOP Boks/Boks Lechia Gdańsk (1945, 1948–52)
- Volleyball club (1945–46)
- Cycling club: KK Lechia Gdańsk
- Tennis club: Gdańskie Towarzystwo Tenisowe Lechia Gdańsk
- Chess club
- Field hockey club
- Handball club
- Ice hockey club
- Sailing club
- Skiing club
- Swimming club
- Table tennis club
- Weightlifting club
- Wrestling club
