= Grzegorz Kacała =

Polish rugby union & rugby league footballer (born 1966)

Grzegorz Kacala
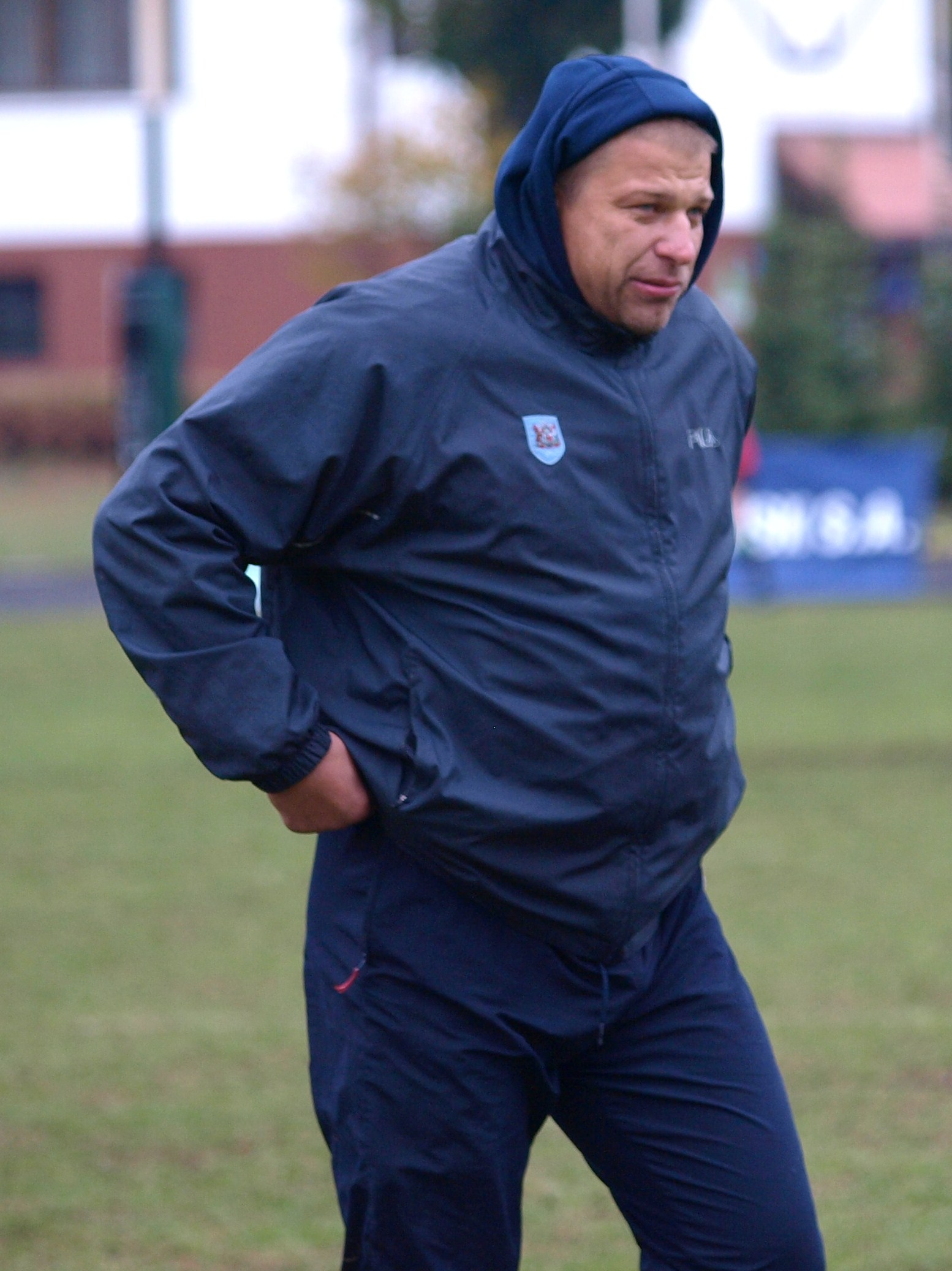
- Full name: Grzegorz Kacała
- Born: 15 March 1966 (age 60) Gdańsk, Poland
- Height: 195 cm (6 ft 5 in)
- Weight: 109 kg (240 lb)

Rugby union career
- Position: No. 8
Senior career
Years	Team	Apps	(Points)
- Lechia Gdańsk
–	Ogniwo Sopot		
–	Club Olympique Creusot Bourgogne		
–	FC Grenoble		
–	Brive		
–	Cardiff		
- Rugby league career

Playing information
- Position: Front row
Club
Years	Team	Pld	T	G	FG	P
1996	Paris Saint-Germain	13				4

Grzegorz Kacała, born 15 March 1966, is a Polish former professional rugby union and rugby league footballer who played in the 1990s, and has coached rugby union in the 2000s and 2010s. In rugby union, his position was in the back row, usually number eight. He is the only Polish player to have been on a Heineken Cup-winning team, in 1997 with CA Brive. He was named man of the match in the final against Leicester Tigers. He currently coaches in Poland at Lechia Gdańsk (2009/2010). He also played with Cardiff RFC. He started his professional career in the Polish League.

He was the first Polish player to play in the rugby league Super League when he played for Paris Saint-Germain in the first season of 1996's Super League I, as a forward.

Currently Kacala has been a member of the Polish Rugby Union c. 2015.

== Clubs ==
- Lechia Gdańsk
- Ogniwo Sopot
- Club Olympique Creusot Bourgogne
- FC Grenoble
- Paris Saint-Germain (RL)
- CA Brive
- Cardiff RFC

== Achievements ==
- French premiership 1993 Runners-up - FC Grenoble
- Heineken Cup 1997 - CA Brive
- Welsh Scottish League (now Pro14) 1999/2000 - Cardiff RFC
- Polish Cup x 2- Ogniwo Sopot
- Polish League - Ogniwo Sopot
