= Pogon =

Pogon may refer to:

- Pogon, Albania, a municipality in Gjirokastër District, Gjirokastër County, Albania
- Pogoń, a Knight-in-pursuit coat of arms of the Grand Duchy of Lithuania
- Pogoni, a municipality in Ioannina regional unit, Greece
- Pogoń Siedlce, a Polish football club
- Pogoń Siedlce, a Polish rugby union club
- Pogoń Szczecin, a Polish football club
- Pogoń Lwów (1904), a defunct Polish football club
- Pogoń Lwów, a Ukrainian football club
