= Narodowy Stadion Rugby =

Multi-purpose stadium in Gdynia, Poland

Coordinates: 54°29′51″N 18°31′51″E

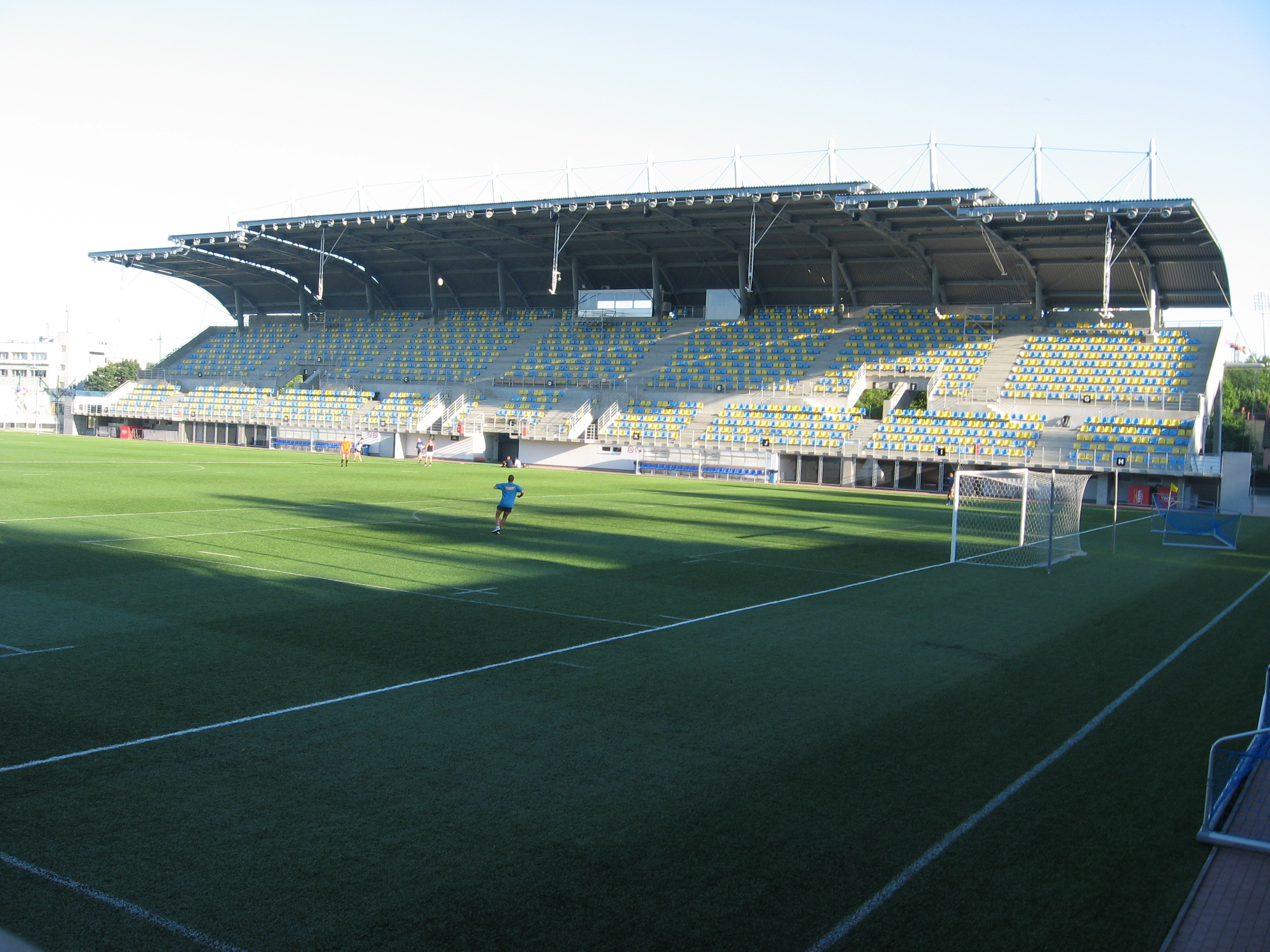
- Interactive map of Narodowy Stadion Rugby
- Location: Gdynia, Pomeranian Voivodeship, Poland
- Owner: City of Gdynia
- Operator: GOSiR Gdynia
- Capacity: 2,425
- Surface: Field (Grass)
- Field size: 120 x 74 meters

Construction
- Built: 2008-09
- Opened: February 14, 2010

Tenants
- RC Arka Gdynia (Ekstraliga, rugby union); Seahawks Gdynia (PLFA, American football); Bałtyk Gdynia (3rd League, football-soccer)

The Narodowy Stadion Rugby (English: National Rugby Stadium) is a multi-purpose stadium in Gdynia, Poland. It is currently used for rugby union (RC Arka Gdynia and the Poland national team) and also for American football games (the Seahawks Gdynia). The stadium has a capacity of 2,425 people and was opened on February 14, 2010.

== History ==
First sport event at the National Rugby Stadium was rugby union match between RC Arka Gdynia and Poland national rugby union team, played on February 14, 2010. First Rugby Ekstraliga match at the stadium was Arka Gdynia' victory against AZS AWF Warszawa 19–9.

Since 2011 the stadium is used for american football games. The Seahawks Gdynia won against the Silesia Miners 34–23 in first football game at the stadium ever.

== Sports ==
=== Rugby union ===
It is the home stadium for RC Arka Gdynia, rugby union team, played in the Rugby Ekstraliga.

=== American football ===
Since 2011 PLFA season, the Pomorze Seahawks back to Gdynia from Gdańsk, renamed to Seahawks Gdynia and played home games at the Rugby Stadium. The Seahawks is one of four founders of the Polish American Football League in 2006.

=== Association football ===
The stadium was used by Arka Gdynia and Bałtyk Gdynia, football (soccer) clubs, when Stadion GOSiR was under construction.

== See also ==
- Rugby union in Poland
