= Kraków Stadium =

The Kraków Stadium may refer to various stadiums in Kraków, Poland.

- Henryk Reyman Stadium
- Juvenia Stadium
- Józef Piłsudski Stadium
- Kraków Speedway Stadium
- Suche Stawy Stadium
- Władysław Kawula Stadium
