= II liga Rugby =

- Sport: Rugby union
- No. of teams: 6
- Country: Poland
- Most recent champion: RC Legia Warsaw

II liga Rugby is the third tier league for rugby union in Poland. Originally there were two divisions, consisting of 8 teams in the Rugby Ekstraliga and 6 in I liga Rugby, however as the sport is growing in popularity and more and more teams are being registered, a third division was created, consisting of 6 teams. Although local divisions do exist, there is no official relegation or promotion system between the national level and the local divisions, the Champions are may be promoted to I liga Rugby,

The competing team gets four points for a win, two points for a draw and zero for a loss. There is an extra point for a team that loses by 7 points or less, and an extra point for scoring 4 or more tries in a game. In the event of a forfeit, the team unable to play will be docked 1 point and their opponent will be awarded a score of 25-0 and 5 points. At present there are no official relegations or promotions from the division.

== Current Teams ==
- Chaos Poznan
- Mazovia Minsk Mazowiecki
- Copper Lubin
- Alfa Bydgoszcz
- Rugby Bialystok
- Unia Brześć / Terespol

== Champions ==
- 2016-2017 - Ark Rumia
- 2015-2016 - Biało-Czarnia Nowy Sacz
- 2014-2015 - Czarni Pruszcz Gdański
- 2013-2014 - RC Legia Warsaw

== Former teams ==
- Dragonia Mosina
- Kaskada Szczecin
- Posnania

== See also ==
- Poland national rugby union team
- Rugby union in Poland
