= AZS-AWFiS Gdańsk Rugby =

Polish handball club

AZS-AWFiS Gdańsk
- Full name: Akademicki Związek Sportowy Akademia Wychowania Fizycznego i Sportu Gdańsk
- Union: Polish Rugby Union
- Founded: 1988; 38 years ago as "Lotnik Pruszcz Gdański"; 2008; 18 years ago (Rugby Sevens team)
- Disbanded: 2006; 20 years ago (Rugby union team)
- Location: Gdańsk, Poland
- League: Polska Liga Rugby 7

AZS-AWFiS Gdańsk is a current Polish rugby sevens team and a former rugby union team. Initially formed in Pruszcz Gdański the club enjoyed some success in the higher levels of Polish rugby in the late 1990s and early 2000s. Since 2000 the club has been based in Gdańsk and has been linked with AZS-AWFiS Gdańsk, the sporting section of the Academy of Physical Education and Sport Jędrzej Śniadeckiego in Gdańsk.

== History ==
Formed in 1988, the club was initially known as Lotnik Pruszcz Gdański and served as Lechia Gdańsk's affiliate team, due to Lechia being a strong team in the Polish leagues and an affiliate team provided playing time for younger or fringe players. Lotnik made their II liga debut in 1992 and continued to play in this league until dropping back to the third tier for the 1996 season. The club immediately returned to the second tier, then known as Seria B, and won the league securing promotion to Poland's top division. In 1998, along with the club's promotion the team's name changed, becoming Dębica Lincer Pruszcz Gdański. During the club's early years in the top flight the team steadily rose up the league table and becoming a more competitive club. Dębica Lincer enjoyed its greatest success in the 1999–2000 season, when the club finished third in the league and won the Polish Cup. It was after this season the club moved to Gdańsk and joined the AZS-AWFiS Gdańsk sports club, initially using the name AZS AWF Dębica Lincer Gdańsk. The team eventually became generally known as AZS-AWFiS Gdańsk due to its links with the sports club. AZS-AWFiS continued to play in the top division until 2005 when the team suffered relegation to the II liga. After failing to secure an immediate return to the top division the rugby club's operations were temporarily suspended and the team was removed from the leagues.

AZS-AWFiS have not fielded a rugby union side since 2006, but have continued to field a rugby sevens team which first started competing in 2008. The rugby sevens team's greatest current success is a 4th place overall finish in the Polska Liga Rugby 7 tournament in 2011.

=== Historic club names ===
- 1988: Lotnik Pruszcz Gdański
- 1998: Dębica Lincer Pruszcz Gdański
- 2000: AZS AWF Dębica Lincer Gdańsk
- 2001: AZS-AWFiS Gdańsk

== Honours ==
Ekstraliga

- Third place: 1999–2000

I liga

- Winners:1997

Polish Cup

- Winners: 2000
