= Gdańsk Stadium (disambiguation) =

The Gdańsk Stadium may refer to:

- Gdańsk Stadium (Lechia Gdańsk, Euro 2012, Poland women's football arena)
- Gdańsk Athletics and Rugby Stadium
- Gdańsk Sports Center Stadium
- Zbigniew Podlecki Stadium

== See also ==
- Ergo Arena
- Hala Olivia
