= RC Arka Gdynia =

Polish rugby union club, based in Gdynia

(Poland) Arka Gdynia
- Union: Polish Rugby Union
- Nickname: Buldogi (Bulldogs)
- Founded: 1996; 30 years ago
- Location: Gdynia, Poland
- Ground: National Rugby Stadium (Capacity: 2,425)
- Chairman: (Poland) Andrzej Stromski
- Coach: (Poland) Maciej Stachura
- Captain: (Poland) Wojciech Ruszkiewicz
- League: Ekstraliga
- 2021–22: 7th
1st kit	2nd kit

Official website
- www.arkarugby.pl

Arka Gdynia (Polish pronunciation: [ˈarka ˈɡdɨɲa]) is a Polish rugby union club based in Gdynia, in northern Poland. As of 2022–23, it competes in the Ekstraliga, Poland's top division.

== Honours ==
- Ekstraliga
  - Champions (4): 2004, 2005, 2011, 2015
  - Runners-up (7): 2000, 2002, 2007, 2009, 2013
- Polish Cup (rugby):
  - Winners (1): 2010

== History ==
Arka Gdynia Rugby Club's history begins in the mid-1990s. The Arka hooligans decided to start a rugby team. Forming the team and winning the "sevens" tournament in Sopot in 1996, is considered the date when the rugby section was established. Arka performances in the league began in 1997. In the 1999/2000 season, the "Bulldogs" won their first medal, and four years later for the first time became the best team in the country. As of 2022, Arka has won three more Polish Championships.

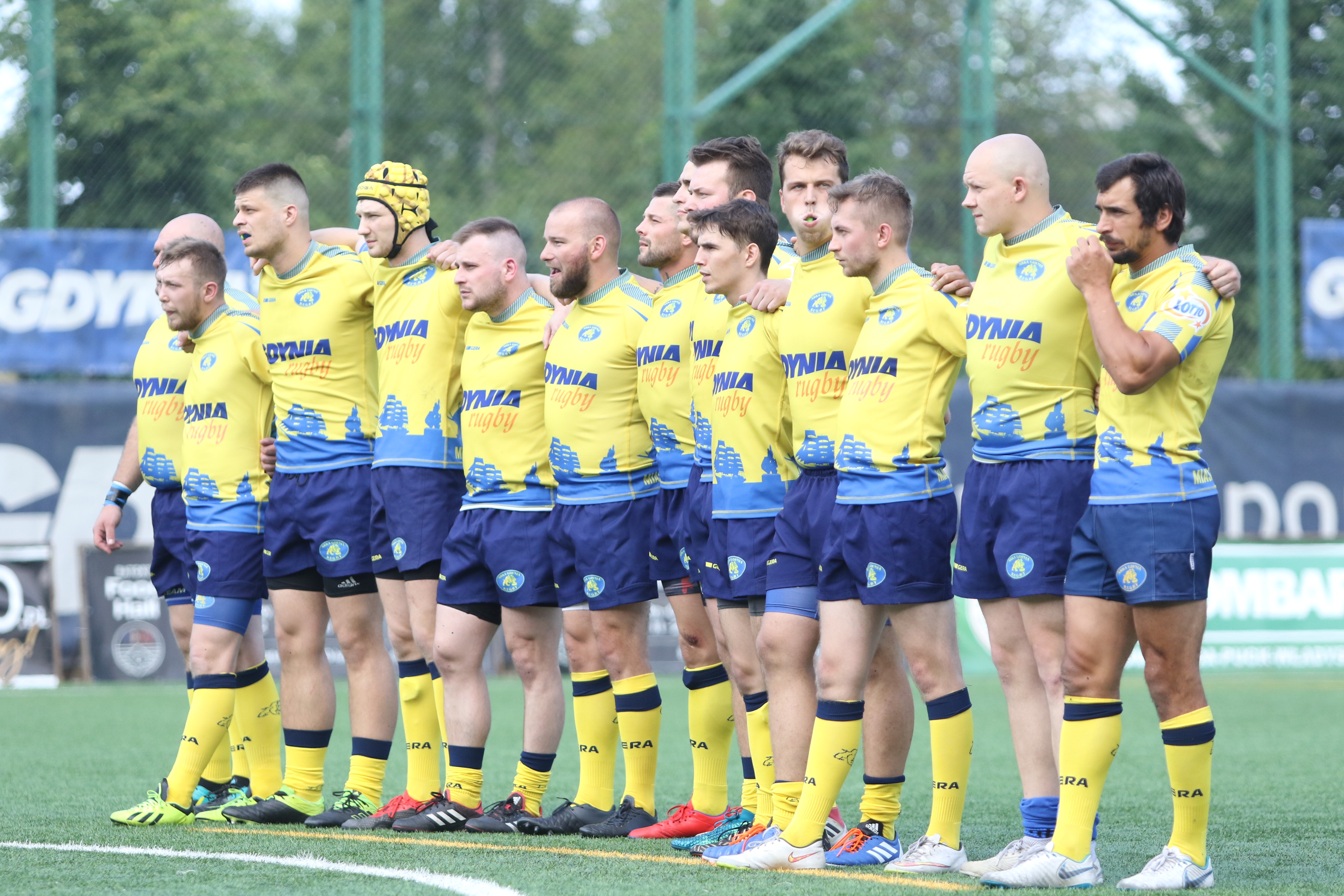
Arka Gdynia rugby team in 2020

== See also ==
- Rugby union in Poland
