= I liga Rugby =

- Sport: Rugby union
- Founded: 1957
- No. of teams: 6
- Country: Poland
- Most recent champion: Juvenia Kraków

I liga Rugby is the second tier league for rugby union in Poland. Originally there were two divisions, consisting of 8 teams in the Rugby Ekstraliga and 6 in I liga, however as the sport is growing in popularity and more and more teams are being registered, third division has now been created, the II liga Rugby.

For victory, a team gets four points, two points for a tie and zero for a loss. There is an extra point for a team that loses by 7 points or less, and an extra point for scoring 4 or more tries in a game. In the event of a forfeit, the team unable to play will be docked 1 point and their opponent will be awarded a score of 25-0 and 5 points.

The champions are promoted to the Rugby Ekstraliga, and the last placed team are relegated to the II liga Rugby.

== Current teams ==
- Sparta Jarocin
- Wataha Zielona Góra
- Arka Rumia
- AZS AWF Warsaw
- Rugby Ruda Śląska
- Legia Warsaw

== Champions ==
- 2016–2017 – Orkan Sochaczew
- 2015–2016 – Juvenia Krakow
- 2014–2015 – Skra Warsaw
- 2013–2014 – Skra Warsaw

== Former teams ==
Team	Stadium	City
AZS-AWF Warsaw	Obrońców Tobruku 11 (980)	Warsaw
RC Kosmaz Koszalin	Wańkowicza 8/37	Koszalin
WMPD Rugby Olsztyn	Artyleryjskiej 3	Olsztyn

== See also ==
- Poland national rugby union team
