= Lechia squamata =

Scientific classification
- Kingdom: Animalia
- Phylum: Arthropoda
- Subphylum: Chelicerata
- Class: Arachnida
- Order: Araneae
- Infraorder: Araneomorphae
- Family: Salticidae
- Genus: Lechia
- Species: L. squamata

Binomial name
- Lechia squamata Żabka, 1985

Synonyms
- Laufeia squamata (Zabka, 1985)

Species of spider

Lechia squamata, synonym Laufeia squamata, is a species of spider of the family Salticidae (jumping spiders). It is found in China and Vietnam. It was formerly the only species in the genus Lechia and was originally described in 1985 by Marek Zabka from a single female, which was beaten from bushes in Vietnam.

== Description ==
The carapace is orange to brown with a broad yellow band near the margin. The areas around the eyes are black, except for the front median eyes, where it is brown-black. The opisthosoma is yellowish with many grey spots. The legs are yellow with grey.
