= Biało-Zielone Ladies Gdańsk =

Rugby sevens club in Gdańsk, Poland

Biało-Zielone Gdańsk
- Full name: Biało-Zielone Ladies Gdańsk
- Union: Polish Rugby Union
- Founded: 2009 as "RC Ladies Lechia Gdańsk"
- Location: Gdańsk, Poland
- Ground(s): Gdańsk Athletics and Rugby Stadium
- League(s): Polish Women's Rugby 7's Championships
| 1st kit | 2nd kit |

Biało-Zielone Ladies Gdańsk is a rugby sevens based in Gdańsk, Poland. Formed in 2009, the club had strong links with the RC Lechia Gdańsk team, and the club itself was known as RC Ladies Lechia Gdańsk at the time of its formation. The ladies rugby club separated from the men's rugby club and the Lechia sports club and became known as Biało-Zielone (English: White-Green).

== History ==
Since the club's creation it has always finished in the top three of the Polish Women's Rugby 7's Championships every year, and has won the competition each year since 2011. In 2013 the team at the time known as RC Mario Ladies Lechia Gdańsk hosted a rugby 7's tournament in Gdańsk called the Mario Cup 2013.

Biało-Zielone Ladies Gdańsk are the most successful ladies rugby 7's team in Poland having won 13 of the 17 national championships (Biało-Zielone did not take part in the first two editions of the championships). The Championships are decided over a series of tournaments held throughout the year. Since their first championship winning season in 2011 Biało-Zielone have played in 85 tournaments winning 78 of them. The first five of the clubs Polish Championships came under the name RC Ladies Lechia Gdańsk, while the most recent eight have been under the Biało-Zielone name.

Biało-Zielone have also won the Polish Cup six times, every time the competition has been competed including winning four years in succession between 2016 and 2019, and won the Rugby 7's beach rugby tournament three times between 2015 and 2017. In both the 2015–16 and 2016–17 seasons Biało-Zielone had unbeaten seasons while also winning the triple both seasons (winning the championship and both the Polish Cup and the Beach Rugby tournament in the same season). In September 2021 Biało-Zielone took part in the European Cup being held in Saint Petersburg, finishing runners-up, and only losing in the final to CSKA Moscow.

It was announced in October 2021 that after 11 consecutive Polish league titles, the Biało-Zielone Gdańsk team was to join the Russian Rugby 7's league, and that the Biało-Zielone II team would continue to play in the Polish leagues, however this decision was reversed after Russia's invasion of Ukraine in February 2022.

== Honours ==
=== Domestic competitions ===
Polish Women's Sevens Championship

- Winners (14): 2011, 2012, 2013, 2013–14, 2014–15, 2015–16, 2016–17, 2017–18, 2018–19, 2019–20, 2020–21, 2021–22, 2022–23, 2023–24
- Runners-up (1): 2010
- Third place (1): 2009

Polish Cup

- Winners (6): 2011, 2016, 2017, 2018, 2019, 2022

Sopot Beach Rugby Tournament

- Winners (3): 2015, 2016, 2017
- Runners-up (1): 2019

Mario Cup

- Winners (2): 2010, 2013

=== Continental competitions ===
European Cup

- Runners-up (1): 2021

Latvian Open 7's

- Winners (1): 2012

Copenhagen 7's

- Winners (1): 2025

== Seasons ==
Seasons are shown since the team's creation in 2009. All available data is included from the 2011 tournaments when all information about the season is easily available online.

(Correct as of 19 May 2024)

| | Championship | | | | | Polish Cup | Other |
| Name | Season | Pos. | Tournaments | Torns. Won | Ref. | Polish Cup | Other |
|---|---|---|---|---|---|---|---|
| Lechia Gdańsk | 2009 | 3rd | - | - | - | Not played | - |
| Lechia Gdańsk | 2010 | 2nd | - | - | - | Not played | Mario Cup |
| Lechia Gdańsk | 2011 | 1st | 4 | 3 | | Winners | - |
| Lechia Gdańsk | 2012 | 1st | 6 | 5 | | Not played | Latvian Open 7's |
| Lechia Gdańsk | 2013 | 1st | **3** | **3** | | Not played | Mario Cup |
| Lechia Gdańsk | 2013–14 | 1st | **6** | **6** | | Not played | - |
| Lechia Gdańsk | 2014–15 | 1st | 7 | 5 | | Not played | Sopot Beach Rugby |
| Biało-Zielone | 2015–16 | 1st | **8** | **8** | | Winners | Sopot Beach Rugby |
| Biało-Zielone | 2016–17 | 1st | **8** | **8** | | Winners | Sopot Beach Rugby |
| Biało-Zielone | 2017–18 | 1st | 8 | 6 | | Winners | - |
| Biało-Zielone | 2018–19 | 1st | **8** | **8** | | Winners | Sopot Beach Rugby |
| Biało-Zielone | 2019–20 | 1st | **5** | **5** | | Not played | - |
| Biało-Zielone | 2020–21 | 1st | 7 | 6 | | Not played | European Cup |
| Biało-Zielone | 2021–22 | 1st | **8** | **8** | - | Winners | |
| Biało-Zielone | 2022–23 | 1st | **7** | **7** | | Not played | |
| Biało-Zielone | 2023–24 | 1st | 8 | 7 | | Not played | |

Key

| | Meaning |
|---|---|
| | Winners |
| | Runners-up |
| | Third place |
| **Bold** | Indicates a "perfect" season of winning every tournament. |

== Awards ==
For the 2020–21 season the tournament organisers introduced a "Most Valuable Player" (MVP) award which could be awarded to the best player of the tournament. The Biało-Zielone recipients of the award are listed below.

| Season | Tournament | Name |
|---|---|---|
| 2020–21 | I | Karolina Jaszczyszyn |
| 2020–21 | II | Natalia Pamięta |
| 2020–21 | III | Natalia Pamięta (2) |
| 2020–21 | IV | Natalia Pamięta (3) |
| 2020–21 | V | Małgorzata Kołdej |
| 2021–22 | I | Karolina Jaszczyszyn (2) |
| 2021–22 | II | Anna Klichowska |
| 2021–22 | III | Natalia Pamięta (4) |
| 2021–22 | VI | Natalia Pamięta (5) |
| 2022–23 | I | Martyna Wardaszka |
| 2022–23 | II | Julia Druzgała |
| 2022–23 | III | Natalia Pamięta (6) |
| 2022–23 | IV | Aleksandra Leśniak |
| 2022–23 | V | Anna Klichowska (2) |
| 2022–23 | VI | Natalia Pamięta (7) |
| 2023–24 | II | Martyna Wardaszka (2) |
| 2023–24 | III | Anna Klichowska (3) |
| 2023–24 | IV | Natalia Pamięta (8) |
| 2023–24 | VI | Anna Klichowska (4) |

=== Multiple MVP winners ===
| Name | Wins |
|---|---|
| Natalia Pamięta | 8 |
| Anna Klichowska | 4 |
| Karolina Jaszczyszyn | 2 |
| Martyna Wardaszka | 2 |
