= AZS Gdańsk =

Former rugby union club based in Gdańsk, Poland

- Full name: Akademicki Zespół Sportowy Politechnika Gdańsk (Academic Sports Team of Gdańsk University of Technology)
- Sport: Rugby union
- Founded: January 1956
- First season: 31 March 1957; Czarni Szczecin – AZS Gdańsk 6:9, verified as a 0:9 walkover
- Disbanded: March 1961
- Based in: Gdańsk
- Location: 4 Siedlecka Street, Gdańsk; 33 Hanka Sawicka Street, Gdańsk
- Owner: Gdańsk University of Technology
- President: Eugeniusz Rogotka
- Head coach: Eugeniusz Rogotka
- Manager: Eugeniusz Rogotka

AZS Gdańsk, also known as AZS Politechnika Gdańsk, was a rugby union club based in Gdańsk, Poland, operating from 1956 to 1961. Founded in January 1956, the club was established, coached, and managed by Eugeniusz Rogotka. The team achieved its greatest success in 1958, winning the Polish senior vice-championship. The rugby section was dissolved in March 1961, before the start of the league season, after some players transferred to Lechia Gdańsk. Allegations of player poaching by Lechia were investigated by the Polish Rugby Union, but no evidence was found. Attempts to revive the team were made in 1963 and 1964 but were unsuccessful.

== History ==
=== Beginnings of rugby in Poland ===
Rugby in Poland emerged in the 1920s, introduced by repatriates and a French military mission. The first club, Orzeł Biały, was established in Warsaw. The inaugural match in Poland took place in Lviv, featuring two teams from Orzeł Biały. Organizational difficulties led to the club's dissolution and a hiatus in rugby activities.

Rugby was revived in Poland in the early 1950s, with Gdańsk becoming a key hub. The first two teams in Gdańsk were AZS Politechnika Gdańsk and a team of students from the Physical Education Technical School, later known as Lechia Gdańsk.

The growing interest in rugby led to its registration as a new sport with the Main Committee for Physical Culture in September 1955. Official registration was formalized by a ministerial decree on 14 December 1955, establishing the Organizing Committee of the Polish Rugby Union, enabling team registrations. AZS Politechnika Gdańsk became the first official rugby team in Gdańsk.

=== Formation of rugby competitions in Poland ===
The first official rugby season in Poland ran from September to December 1956, consisting of five regional leagues serving as qualifiers for the top league in the following season. AZS Politechnika Gdańsk competed in the Gdańsk-Bydgoszcz group against Lechia Gdańsk, Stal Gdańsk, and Goplana Inowrocław, winning the group and earning promotion to the top league.

=== 1957 season ===
AZS Gdańsk began its top-league campaign in the 1957 season, then the only centralized league in Poland. Their first match, on 31 March 1957, was an away game against Czarni Szczecin, ending 6:9 (3:3) but verified as a 0:9 walkover due to an ineligible player in the Szczecin team. In their second match, AZS defeated Górnik Bytom 18:14 (3:6). They suffered their first loss in the third round against the eventual champions, AZS AWF Warszawa. In the fourth round, they drew 3:3 (3:3) with Górnik Kochłowice. Subsequent victories included a 3:6 (3:3) win over Start Łódź. A scheduled home match against Górnik Katowice was not played due to the visitors' failure to appear.

In the second round, AZS lost 0:11 (0:3) away to Górnik Bytom and drew 9:9 at home in Wejherowo against Grochów Warszawa. They lost away to Górnik Kochłowice 5:9 and at home to AZS AWF Warszawa 0:30, trailing only 0:3 at halftime. The remaining matches were walkover victories for AZS Politechnika Gdańsk.

The AZS Politechnika reserves competed in the regional league against Lechia Gdańsk, Polonia Gdańsk, Zryw TWF Gdańsk, Wisła Bydgoszcz, Goplana Inowrocław, and Posnania Poznań.

=== 1958 season ===
In 1958, the top league expanded to 10 teams, including four from the previous season and six promoted from regional leagues. AZS was unbeaten in the spring round, securing six victories against promoted teams: Posnania 11:9 (11:6), Lotnik 3:6 (3:0), AZS Szczecin 17:8 (9:5), Włókniarz 6:9 (3:6), AZS Lublin 14:6 (8:3), and Lechia Gdańsk 6:3 (3:3), later verified as a walkover due to an ineligible player in Lechia's lineup. AZS also defeated the defending champions, AZS AWF Warszawa, 9:8 (3:0), and Czarni Bytom 8:6 (8:3). The match against Górnik Kochłowice was played at the season's end. In the autumn round, AZS lost 8:6 (3:3) away to Posnania but won against Lotnik 14:3 (3:3), Lechia 24:0 (19:0), AZS Szczecin 16:0 (3:0), Włókniarz 18:6 (12:0), Górnik 11:3 (11:3), and AZS Lublin 19:3 (6:0). They lost 6:3 (3:3) to AZS AWF Warszawa in Warsaw and defeated Czarni 6:3 (0:0). Needing only a draw with a bonus point against Górnik Kochłowice to secure the championship, AZS lost, allowing AZS AWF Warszawa to retain the title. AZS Politechnika Gdańsk finished second, earning their only Polish championship medal.

AZS Gdańsk won the fair play classification.

=== 1959 season ===
The 1959 league was divided into northern and southern groups. AZS Politechnika competed in the northern group, with the top two teams advancing to a final group for places 1–4, the third and fourth for places 5–8, and the weakest for place 9.

AZS started with two away losses: 3:8 (0:0) to Lechia and 3:9 (3:3) at home to AZS AWF Warszawa. They won against Posnania in Gdańsk 11:6 (0:3) and Pionier in Szczecin 12:6 (6:3). In the return round, they lost to AZS AWF Warszawa 13:6 (8:3) but defeated Lechia 8:0 (3:0), Pionier 15:11 (6:11), and Posnania 9:6 (3:6). A better small points balance secured their advancement to the final round.

In the finals, AZS lost all matches: 6:17 (3:9) to AZS Warszawa, 3:6 (0:6) to Czarni Bytom, and 8:18 (5:0) to Włókniarz, finishing fourth.

=== 1960 season ===
The 1960 season followed the same format as 1959.

AZS began with a 0:6 (0:3) home loss to Lechia but won 9:8 (3:3) away against AZS AWF Warszawa. They drew 9:9 (3:6) with Posnania in Poznań and defeated Pionier in Szczecin 17:14 (17:0). In the Gdańsk derby, Lechia won 11:9 (0:6), and AZS lost 0:5 (0:5) at home to AZS AWF Warszawa. Victories over Posnania 11:0 and Pionier 23:0 were insufficient for final round qualification.

In the 5–8 place finals, only two matches were played due to Włókniarz's withdrawal and AZS conceding a walkover in their final match. AZS lost 9:22 (6:16) to Posnania, finishing seventh.

=== Dissolution and rugby's situation ===
Before the 1961 season, nine key AZS Politechnika players transferred to Lechia, leading to the team's dissolution due to an incomplete roster. Lechia faced accusations of player poaching, but the Polish Rugby Union found no evidence.

The dissolution coincided with a broader crisis in Polish rugby. The Main Committee for Physical Culture classified rugby as a lower-tier sport. In 1961, AZS Gdańsk, Górnik Kochłowice, and Pionier Szczecin did not compete, with only Rozwój Katowice joining for one season. By 1962, Lotnik Warszawa withdrew, and in 1963, only four teams remained in the league. In 1963, the Polish Rugby Union received a minimal grant from the Polish Olympic Committee, sufficient only for office rent.

== National team players ==
AZS Politechnika Gdańsk produced nine Polish national team players (matches played for Poland while at AZS):

- Wiesław Żurawski – 9 matches
- Tadeusz Jodkowski – 4 matches
- Ryszard Wojciechowski – 3 matches
- Leon Dzieruń – 2 matches
- Maciej Kamiński – 2 matches
- Henryk Dziokiewicz – 1 match
- Henryk Hodiak – 1 match
- Andrzej Rydwan-Wiński – 1 match
- Janusz Rychławski – 1 match

== Bibliography ==
- Bocheński, Damian (2007). Zarys pięćdziesięcioletnich dziejów rugby w gdańskiej Lechii [Outline of Fifty Years of Rugby History at Lechia Gdańsk] (in Polish).
- Powała-Niedźwiecki, Michał; Wierzbicki, Jacek (2004). Encyklopedia Polskiego Rugby [Encyclopedia of Polish Rugby] (in Polish). Lublin: Print 6. ISBN 83-87414-53-0.
- Radzikowski, Leon (1973). 50 lat rugby w Polsce [50 Years of Rugby in Poland] (in Polish). Warsaw: Polski Związek Rugby.
