= Alfa Rugby Bydgoszcz =

- Nickname(s): Alfa, Bydgoskie Byki (Bydgoszcz Bulls)
- Founded: 2003
- Location: Bydgoszcz, Poland
- President: (Poland) Leszek Komoń (also coach)
Team kit

Alfa Rugby Bydgoszcz is a Polish rugby club based in Bydgoszcz.
