= Gdańsk Athletics and Rugby Stadium =

Rugby and athletics stadium in Gdańsk, Poland

Coordinates: 54°23′27.92″N 18°34′57.92″E

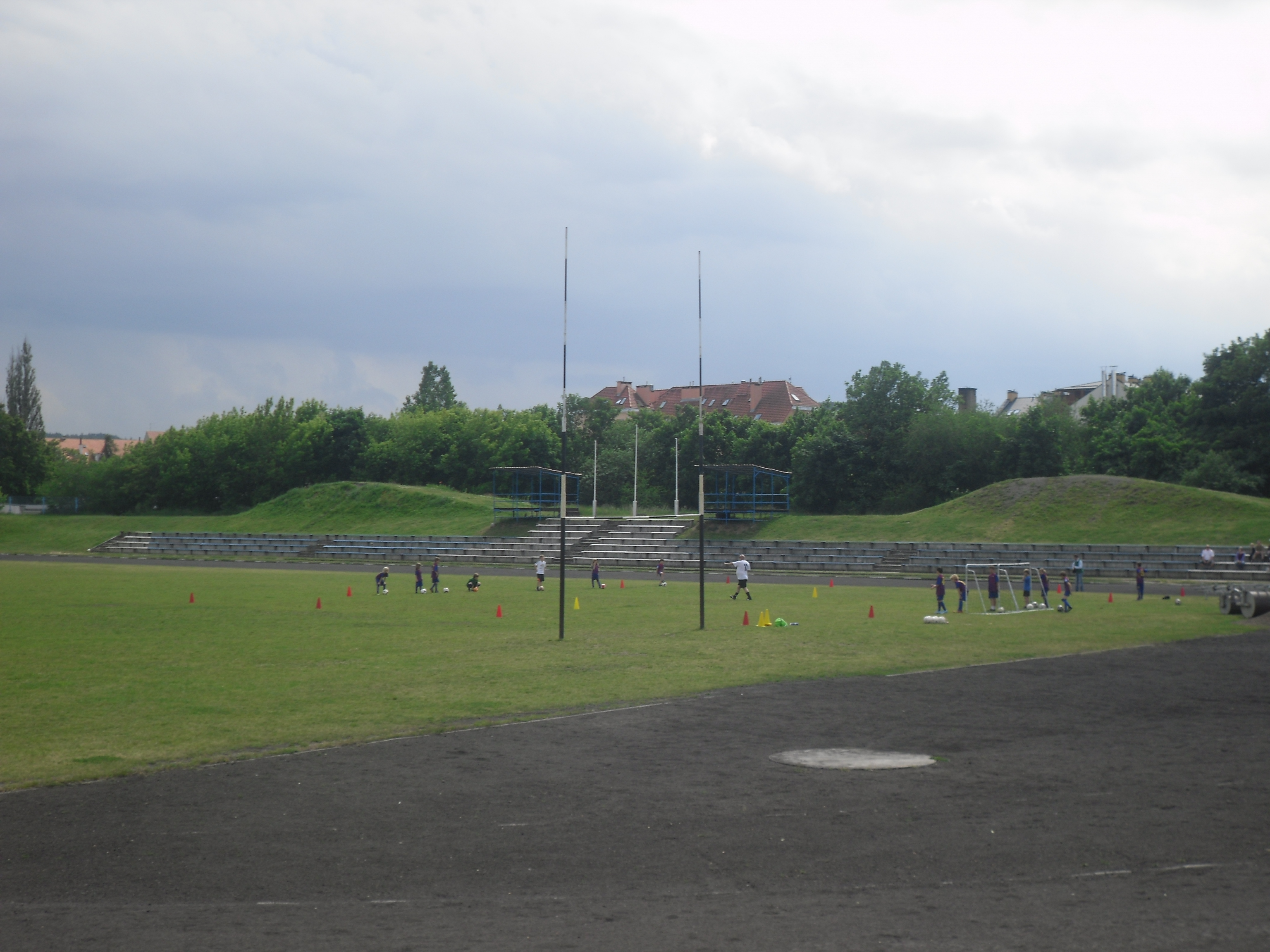
- Gdańsk Athletics and Rugby Stadium
- Interactive map of Gdańsk Athletics and Rugby Stadium
- Full name: Gdański Stadion Lekkoatletyczny i Rugby
- Former names: Gdańskiego Ośrodka Kultury Fizycznej (GOFK Stadion) (Gdańsk Physical Culture Center)
- Location: Gdańsk, Poland
- Owner: Gdańsk Sports Center
- Capacity: 936
- Surface: Grass
- Field size: 102 × 64 m (112 × 70 yd)

Construction
- Renovated: 2015–16

Tenants
- KL Lechia Gdańsk; RC Lechia Gdańsk (2012–); Biało-Zielone Ladies Gdańsk (2012–); AP Orlen Gdańsk (2015–)

Gdańsk Athletics and Rugby Stadium (Polish: Gdański Stadion Lekkoatletyczny i Rugby) is a rugby and athletics stadium in Gdańsk, Poland. Formerly known as the Gdańsk Physical Culture Center (Polish: Gdańskiego Ośrodka Kultury Fizycznej) it was often abbreviated to and known as the GOKF Stadion until the stadiums renovation in 2016. The stadium is run by the Gdańsk Sports Center (Polish: Gdański Ośrodek Sportu) and is currently used by RC Lechia Gdańsk and AP Orlen Gdańsk for their home games, and Biało-Zielone Ladies Gdańsk for their training sessions.

== Facilities ==
The renovation during 2015–16 cost a total of PLN 12 million. The facilities after the renovation were; a sports field with a natural grass surface with the dimensions of 64x102m to be used as a rugby and football pitch with modern sports lighting, an eight lane 400m running track around the pitch, a 100m and 110m section of straight track, areas for throwing events, athletic sports equipment in the sports arena (i.e. two shot put and two javelin areas, a water ditch, areas for discus and hammer throw, two high jump jumps, two pole vault jumps, and two triple jump and long jump sandpits), a professional timing system, scoreboard, a synthetic football pitch for training with the dimensions of 30x60m, stands with space for 924 spectators with space for 12 disabled viewers, and parking for 3 coaches, 64 cars, and space for vehicles of disabled viewers.
