= Lechia (spider) =

Scientific classification
- Kingdom: Animalia
- Phylum: Arthropoda
- Subphylum: Chelicerata
- Class: Arachnida
- Order: Araneae
- Infraorder: Araneomorphae
- Family: Salticidae
- Subfamily: Salticinae
- Genus: Lechia; Żabka, 1985

Type species
- L. squamata Żabka, 1985

Species
- Lechia minuta (Prószyński, 1992); Lechia squamata Żabka, 1985

Genus of jumping spiders

Lechia is a small genus of Asian jumping spiders first described by Marek Michal Zabka in 1985. As of March 2022 it contains only two species: L. minuta and L. squamata.

== See also ==
- Laufeia
- List of Salticidae genera
