= RC Posnania =

Polish rugby union club, based in Poznań

Posnania
- Union: Polish Rugby Union
- Nickname: Muszkieterowie (Musketeers)
- Founded: 8 May 1907; 118 years ago 1956; 70 years ago (rugby team)
- Location: Poznań, Poland
- Ground: Posnania Stadium (Capacity: 3,500)
- Chairman: (Poland) Michał Fijałkowski
- Coach: (Poland) Krzysztof Baraniecki
- League: Rugby Ekstraliga
- 2009–10: 6th
1st kit	2nd kit

Official website
- www.posnania.com

RC Posnania (Polish pronunciation: [pɔzˈnaɲa]) is a Polish rugby union club based in Poznań, Poland. It was founded in 1906 as a sport club. In 1956 the rugby union team was created.

== Honours ==
- Rugby Ekstraliga
  - Runners-up: 1962
- Polish Cup:
  - Winner:(1): 1974

== See also ==
- Rugby union in Poland
- Rugby Ekstraliga
