= Henri Sanz =

France international rugby union player

Henri Sanz (born Versailles, 17 June 1963) was a French rugby union player. He played as a scrum-half.

Sanz first played for Electrogaz Toulouse, then in SC Graulhet, moving afterwards to RC Narbonne, where he would spend most of his career. He reached the post of captain and won three titles of the Cup of France, in 1988/89, 1989/90 and 1990/91. He was a runner-up twice for the title of French Champion, in 1987/88 and 1988/89.

Sanz had 11 caps for France, from 1988 to 1991, scoring 1 try and 4 points in aggregate. He played at the Five Nations in 1990 and was member of the France squad at the 1991 Rugby World Cup, but was never capped.
