= KL Lechia Gdańsk =

Athletics club based in Gdańsk, Poland

- Full name: Klub Lekkoatletyczny Lechia Gdańsk
- Founded: 1945; 80 years ago
- Ground: Gdańsk Athletics and Rugby Stadium
- Website: http://www.kl-lechia.pl/

Klub Lekkoatletyczny Lechia Gdańsk (English: Athletics Club Lechia Gdańsk) is a Polish athletics club based in Gdańsk, Poland. The athletics club was formed and became part of the Lechia Gdańsk sports club. While the club has not been officially associated with the other sporting sections since 2002, the athletics club still continues with the name Lechia.

In 2007 Lechia started building a new athletics stadium and training complex. The building was to be completed in 2010, and to be called the "Stadion Lekkoatletyczny KL Lechia" but was later abandoned.

The club states that its purpose and aims are to; provide better sporting opportunities for the inhabitants of Gdańsk, provide development for the best athletes as well as providing the best possible conditions for its athletes and competitors, and to promote sport and recreation for the disabled inhabitants.

== Achievements ==
The following achievements were attained by athletes from the sports club;

(Time spent at Lechia in brackets)

Kazimierz Zimny (Long-distance runner, 1958–1967) - 1960 Summer Olympics, 5000m, 3rd place. 1958 European Championships, 5000m, 2nd place. 1962 European Championships, 5000m, 2nd place.

Mieczysław Łomowski (Shot put, 1945–1951) - 1948 Summer Olympics, 4th. Flag bearer at the 1948 Summer Olympics.

Katarzyna Radtke (Racewalking, 1983–2000) - 1992 Summer Olympics, 10 km, 11th place. 1996 Summer Olympics, 10 km, 7th place. Holds the Polish record for 3000m with a time of 12:17.17.

Bernadetta Blechacz (Javelin, 1976–1984) - 1980 Summer Olympics, 9th.

Piotr Gładki (Long-distance runner) - Holds the Polish record for the half marathon with a time of 1:01:35. 2000 Hamburg Marathon, 1st.

Other Olympians - Elżbieta Bocian, Jan Kielas, Gerard Mach.

=== Olympic medals ===
Medal	Athlete	Event	Olympics
Bronze	Kazimierz Zimny	1960 Summer Olympics	Men's 5000 metres

== Former athletes ==
Athletes who represented Lechia and went on to have successful careers.

(Time spent at Lechia in brackets)

Władysław Komar (Shot put, 1961–1963)

Komar is the most successful athlete to have ever represented Lechia at some point. While he was too young to have success with Lechia, during his career he went on to win many medals in European championships, with his greatest achievement coming in the 1972 Summer Olympics, winning gold in the shot put.
