= Skra Warsaw (rugby) =

Skra Warszawa Rugby
- Founded: 1964
- Location: 47/51 Grójecka Street, Warsaw, Poland
- Coach(es): Tomasz Borowski
Team kit

Skra Rugby Warsaw (Skra Rugby Warszawa) is a Polish rugby club based in Warsaw. They play in the I liga Rugby.
