= Juvenia Kraków =

Polish rugby union club, based in Kraków

(Poland) RzKS Juvenia Kraków
- Full name: Rzemieślniczy Klub Sportowy Juvenia Kraków
- Union: Polish Rugby Union
- Nickname: Smoki (Dragons)
- Founded: 8 December 1906 (football club); 1973 (rugby team)
- Location: Kraków, Poland
- Ground: Stadion Juvenii Kraków (Capacity: 800)
- Chairman: Leszek Samel
- Coach: Konrad Jarosz
- Captain: Maciej Dorywalski
- League: Rugby Ekstraliga
1st kit	2nd kit

Official website
- juvenia.info

Juvenia Kraków (Polish pronunciation: [ˈjuvɛɲa ˈkrakuf]) is a Polish rugby union club based in Kraków, Poland. They were founded in 1906 (like Wisła Kraków and Cracovia) as a football club. The rugby union team was founded in 1973 and currently plays in the Rugby Extraleague.

== History of the rugby section ==
Originally founded in 1950, the rugby section of Juvenia Kraków was created as a second-tier team and was quickly promoted to I Liga, the highest level of rugby in Poland at the time. However, this initial success was short-lived, and the section was dissolved at the end of the season due to lack of funding. This marked the first interruption in Juvenia's rugby history, leaving a lasting mark on the club.

It wasn’t until 1973 that the rugby section was reorganized, thanks to the efforts of Krzysztof Kalisz, then vice-president of sports at the club, who sought to fill the gap left by the disbanded basketball section. This initiative allowed Juvenia to field a competitive rugby team again, registered in II Liga, the second national division. The first official match of this new era took place in August 1974 against Posnania, a team recently relegated from I Liga. It was a tough start, ending in a 60–0 defeat, but the players remained determined. Juvenia’s first championship victory came in 1976, marking the beginning of their rise. That same year, the team reached the semi-finals of the Polish Cup, narrowly losing to Czarni Bytom (12–15).

The following years were challenging. From 1978 to 1980, the rugby section faced a temporary suspension of competition due to roster issues. This was followed by a return to action in II Liga, where the team showed strong potential. In the 1980s, Juvenia became a feared side, coming close to promotion to I Liga multiple times. In 1982, they missed promotion by a single match, drawing 7–7 with Budowlani Olsztyn. Another close attempt came in 1984, but again ended in disappointment.

In 1987, internal conflicts within the club over the location of matches led to a turning point. The rugby team was transferred to Korona Kraków, where it played for two years before the section was dissolved again in 1988. During this time, players continued to play friendly matches under the Juvenia name. This transitional period ended in 1993 with the official re-establishment of the team as Rugby Klub Kraków 1993. In 1996, the club returned to its original identity, once again competing as Juvenia.

The turn of the millennium marked a revival for Juvenia. In 2000, the team returned to the highest level of national competition, the Ekstraliga. Juvenia competed for three seasons before being relegated in 2003. The team bounced back quickly, regaining its place in Ekstraliga in 2005 after winning a playoff match. This success was boosted in 2006 by securing a strategic sponsor, Salwator, a real estate company, which helped the team professionalize further.

The year 2009 was particularly memorable for Juvenia Kraków. Under the name Salwator Juvenia Kraków, the team achieved its greatest success by finishing third in the national championship and earning the bronze medal. They lost in the semi-finals to a strong Arka Gdynia team (6–15). That year, they also reached the semi-finals of the Polish Cup. However, by the end of the year, the partnership with Salwator ended, leading to financial difficulties.

These challenges led to the team's relegation in 2012. With renewed determination, Juvenia returned to the Ekstraliga in 2014. The year 2015 posed a new challenge: despite solid sporting results, the club's management chose to play in a lower division due to staffing and infrastructure issues. Nonetheless, the team demonstrated resilience and returned to the Ekstraliga the very next year.

Since then, Juvenia Kraków has strengthened its position in Polish rugby. In 2020 and 2021, the team earned bronze medals in the Polish Rugby Sevens Championship, proving it could compete at a high level despite challenges. Meanwhile, Juvenia’s women’s section also stood out, with the senior team winning a bronze medal in 2019, and the juniors collecting three gold and one silver medal in national championships.

The club's commitment to youth development paid off spectacularly in 2019 when its youth teams placed second in an invitational international tournament held during the Dubai Rugby Sevens. The young Dragons of Juvenia stunned the crowd by defeating four South African teams en route to the final.

During the 2023–2024 season, Juvenia Kraków had an exceptional first half, finishing the round-robin phase undefeated. However, a series of injuries affected the squad in the second half of the season. The club ultimately finished 3rd in the overall standings and lost the bronze final to Pogoń Siedlce (30–10). Despite this, the season was considered historic, marking the second-best result in club history with a 4th place finish nationally.

In 2024–2025, former Canadian international Ciaran Hearn took over as head coach. Despite high expectations, Juvenia finished 5th, missing out on the finals in a transitional season focused on integrating young players.

That same year, Juvenia launched a women’s rugby sevens team in partnership with Rugby Rzeszów. Competing in the I Liga, this joint team secured a 5th place finish in its third official tournament, highlighting the growing development of women’s rugby within the club.

In 2025, Juvenia Kraków reopened its modernised facilities after a comprehensive renovation financed by the City of Kraków. The works included the construction of new changing rooms, a gym, renovated functional spaces, and upgraded stands, significantly improving training conditions and the experience for supporters. At the same time, the club continues to develop its Academy, which now includes around 140 young players across eight training categories, reflecting the growing interest in rugby among children and youth. Juvenia aims to further strengthen its training centre and secure a second pitch to meet increasing needs. The club’s sporting objective is to build a senior team capable of consistently competing at the top of the Ekstraliga and ultimately fighting for Polish championship medals.

== The board ==
- President – (Poland) Rafał Budka
- Head Coach - (Canada) Ciaran Hearn
- Assistant Coach - (Poland) Marcjan Krzykawski

== First team squad ==
Forwards; (Poland) Marcin Siemaszko (Poland) Tomir Wiertek (Poland) Bartłomiej Skoczeń (Poland) Maciej Dorywalski (Poland) Mikołaj Wieczorkowski (Poland) Adam Grabski (Poland) Maciej Antczak (Ukraine) Radion Yavorshchuk (Ukraine) Oleg Chornyi (Ukraine) Andrii Matsiuk (South Africa) Peet Vorster (South Africa) Michael Masindi (South Africa) Uzukhanye Nohe (Namibia) MJ Atkinson (France) Arthur Klis (England) Norbert Zastawnik (Georgia (country)) Nika Beroshvili	Backs; (Poland) Patryk Sakwa (Poland) Michał Jurczyński (Poland) Mateusz Polakiewicz (Poland) Rafał Lewicki (Poland) Bartłomiej Janeczko (Poland) Jakub Rapacz (Ukraine) Arsenii Pastukhov (South Africa) Austin van Heerden (Namibia) Riaan van Zyl (France) Patrick Rozycki
