= Juvenia Stadium =

Rugby stadium in Kraków, Poland

Coordinates: 50°03′30″N 19°54′23″E

Juvenia Kraków Stadium
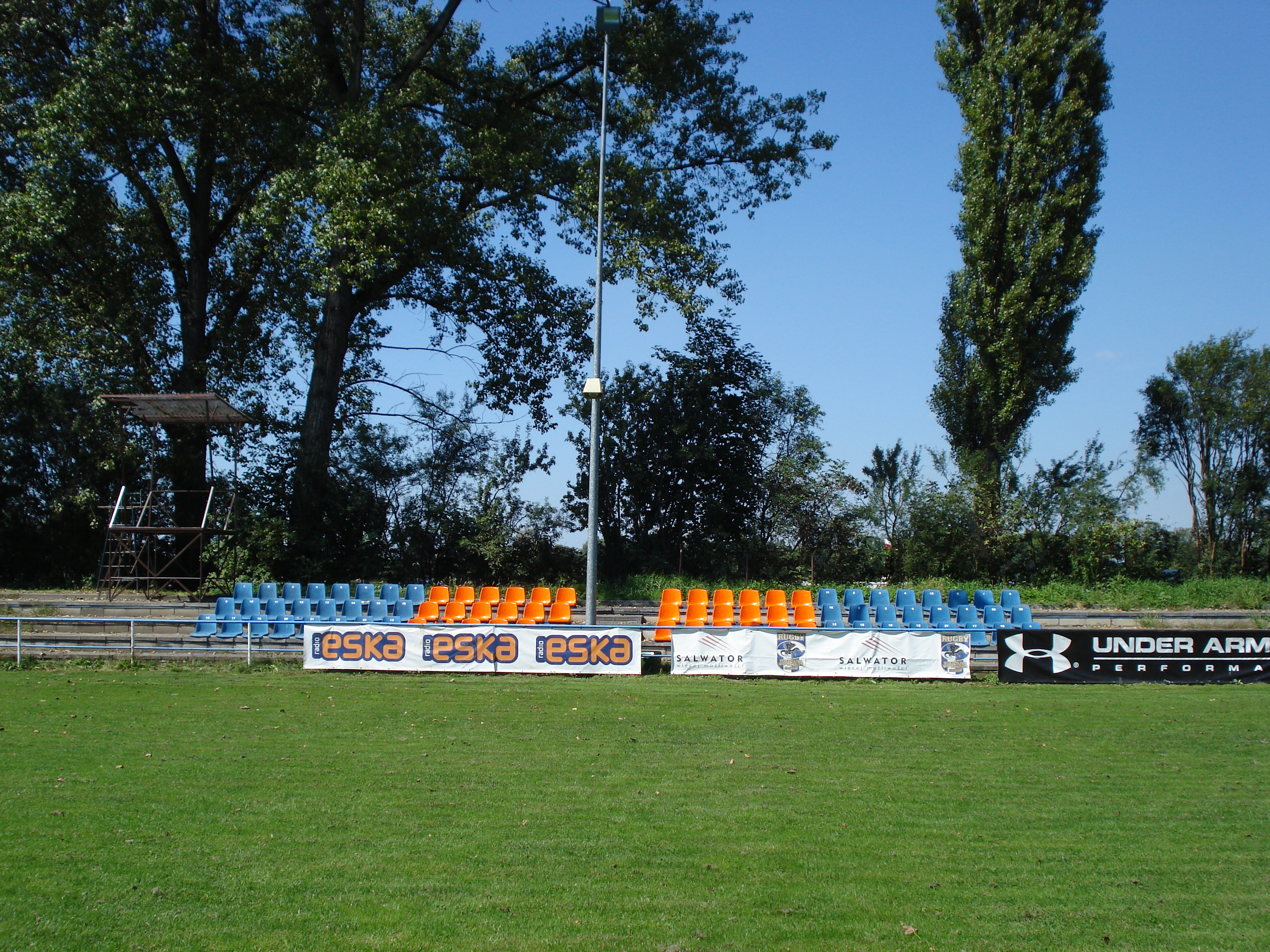
- Interactive map of Juvenia Kraków Stadium
- Location: Kraków, Poland
- Owner: Juvenia Kraków
- Operator: Juvenia Kraków
- Capacity: 800
- Surface: Grass

Tenant
- Juvenia Kraków

Juvenia Stadium (Polish: Stadion Juvenii Kraków) is a rugby union stadium in Kraków, Poland. It currently is used mainly for rugby union matches (it was previously used for football) and is the home stadium of Juvenia Kraków. The stadium has a capacity of 800 people. The pitch area was modernised and upgraded in 2016 - the seating area is still looking to be modernized

Apart from hosting league games, the stadium is also a host to 2 international rugby festivals- Krakow Rugby Festival and Krakow 7's
