= MKS Pogoń Siedlce (rugby union) =

Polish rugby union club, based in Siedlce

(Poland) MKS Pogoń Siedlce
- Full name: Miejski Klub Sportowy Pogoń Aventa Siedlce
- Founded: 1944; 82 years ago
- Location: Siedlce, Poland
- Ground: Municipal Stadium (Capacity: 2,900; expanding to 8,000)
- Chairman: Jakub Czaplicki
- Coach: Marek Mirosz
- League: Rugby Ekstraliga
- 2024–25: 1st (champions)

Official website
- www.pogon.siedlce.pl

Miejski Klub Sportowy Pogoń Siedlce (often referred to just as Pogoń Siedlce) is a Polish rugby union club based in Siedlce, that plays in the Rugby Ekstraliga.

Siedlce were promoted to the Rugby Ekstraliga from the First Division in 2011–12, having finished third. They won their first national title in the 2024–25 season, after defeating Orkan Sochaczew 21–9 in the final.

== History ==
The club was formed in 1944. They were a First Division team, but earned promotion up to the top flight of Polish rugby.

== Stadium ==
The club plays their home games at the Municipal Stadium. They share it with the football club MKP Pogoń Siedlce
