= Budowlani Łódź =

Polish sports club, based in Łódź

(Poland) Klub Sportowy Budowlani Łódź
- Nickname: Budowlani
- Founded: 1948; 78 years ago
- Location: Łódź, Poland
- Ground: ul. Górnicza 5, 91-765 Łódź
- League: Rugby Ekstraliga
- 2013: 4th

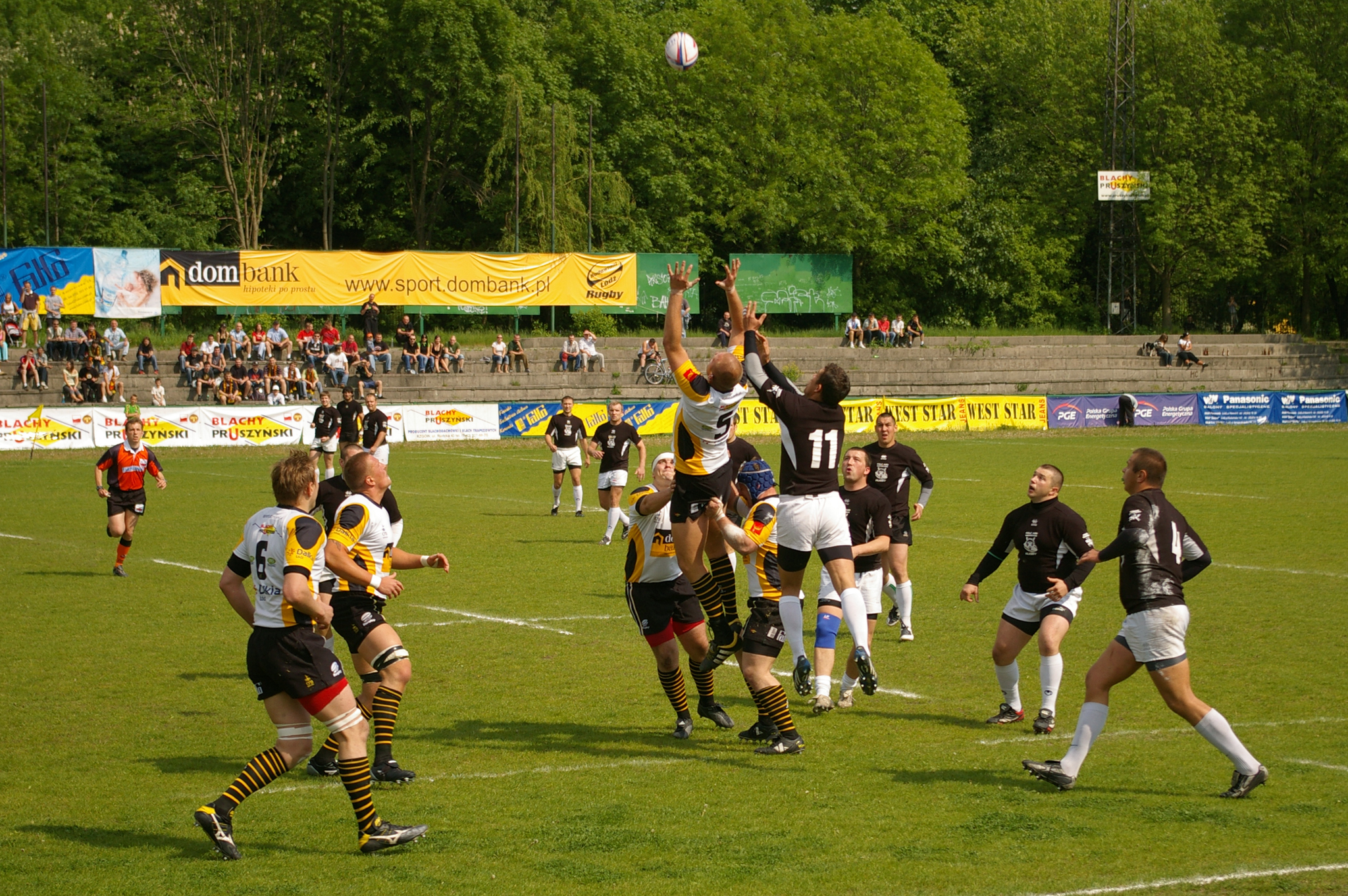
Rugby match between Budowlane Łódź and Folc AZS AWF Warszawa, Łódź, 1st rugby league, regular season

Budowlani Łódź (Klub Sportowy Budowlani Łódź) is a sports club based in Łódź, Poland. The club was founded in 1948. The club participates in many men's and women's sports. They are primarily known as a rugby union club but also compete in volleyball, hockey, Judo and wrestling. They compete in the national men's Rugby Ekstraliga and have won it five times. Budowlani translates to English as 'builders', reflecting the club's origins. The club still often host road builders and other construction workers in the accommodation above the clubhouse.

The club's main facility is located at Gornica Street north of Lodz city centre. There are two rugby pitches, changing rooms, a gym, a bar/restaurant and accommodation. There is also a hall at Brukowa street which houses an indoor hall for sports such as Judo, Volleyball and Wrestling. It is also used for indoor winter training.

== Volleyball ==
The volleyball team play their home games in the Atlas Arena, although they still train at the club's facility at Brukowa Street.

== Rugby ==
KS Budowlani

The club has a long association with rugby union, and are one of Poland's most famous and successful clubs. They were national champions five times, in 1983, 2006 & 2007, 2009 & 2010. The club still maintains one of the largest underage rugby structures in Poland, and reformed a senior men's team in 2013, playing in the second tier Liga I.

Budowlani SA

In 2012, the decision was made to allow the senior men's rugby team split from the club and become a private limited company, an SA. The new company was allowed to assume the team's history and was to continue to play at the club's home ground. However the new company were unhappy with the quality of the facilities and left. They now play most home games at SMS sports klub on Milionowa street. They have also played select games at the much larger ŁKS Stadium. Budowlani SA compete in the top tier of Polish Rugby, the Ekstraliga.

== See also ==
- Rugby union in Poland
- Rugby Ekstraliga
