= Ogniwo Sopot =

Polish rugby union club, based in Sopot

MKS Ogniwo Sopot
- Full name: Miejski Klub Sportowy Ogniwo Sopot
- Location: Sopot, Poland
- President: (Poland) Henryk Kurowski
- Coach: (Poland) Karol Czyż
- League: Ekstraliga
Team kit

MKS Ogniwo Sopot is a Polish rugby club based in Sopot, in Pomeranian Voivodeship. They have been the Polish national champions 11 times.
