= Rugby union in Poland =

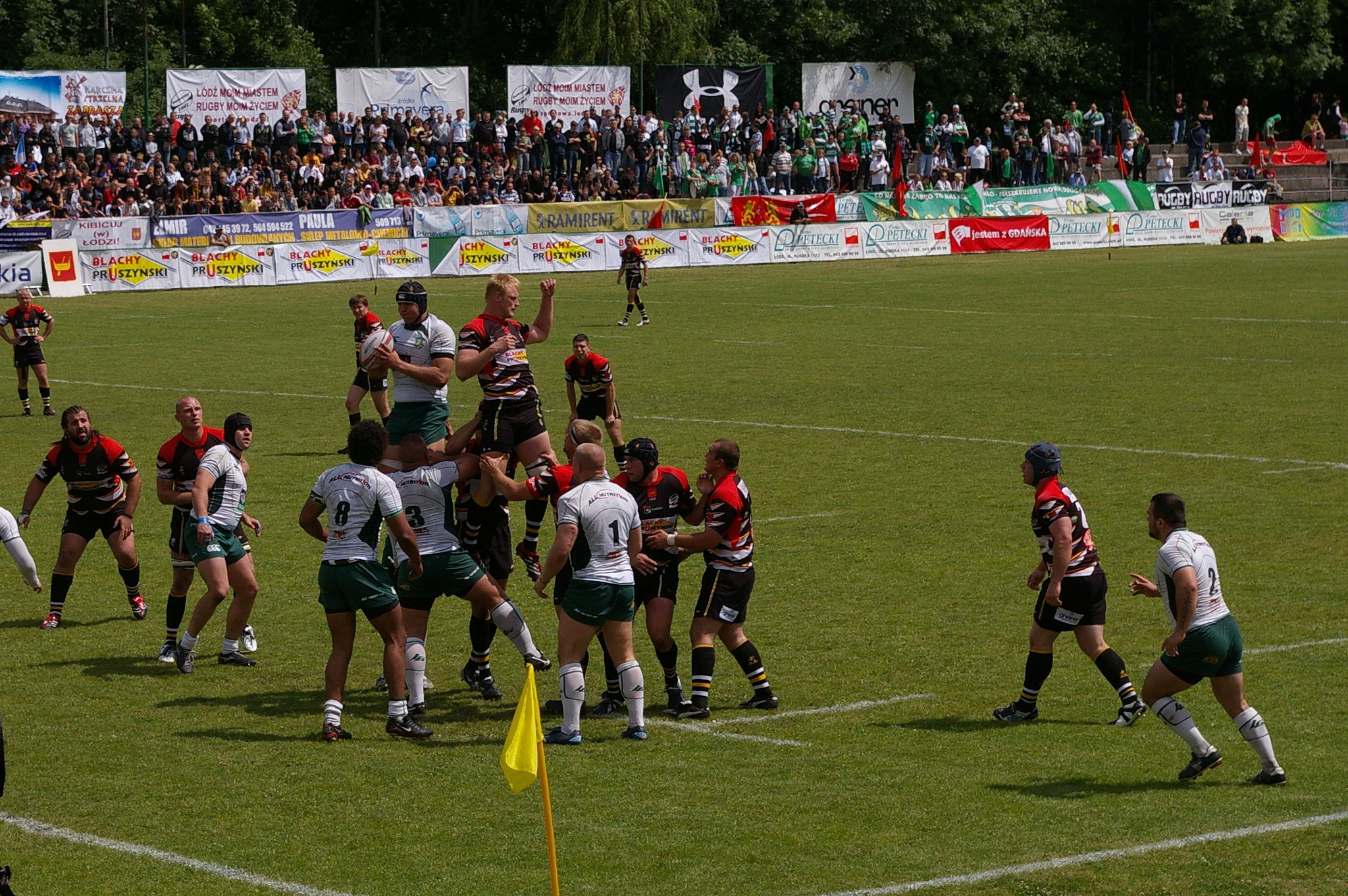
- Budowlani Łódź playing Lechia Gdańsk in the Ekstraliga rugby final in 2010.
- Country: Poland
- Governing body: Polish Rugby Union
- National team: Poland
- Nicknames: Biało-czerwoni (The White and Reds)
- First played: 1922
- Registered players: 6,779
- Clubs: 74

National competitions
- Rugby World Cup; Rugby Europe International Championships; Rugby World Cup Sevens; World Rugby Sevens Series

Club competitions
- Ekstraliga; I liga Rugby; II liga Rugby

Audience records
- Season: Ekstraliga; I liga Rugby; II liga Rugby

Rugby union in Poland is a moderately popular sport, and the Polish men's national team are ranked 30th in the world, as of 1 September 2025. The Poland women's rugby sevens team won the silver medal at the 2023 European Games, behind Great Britain, progressing to the final 2024 Summer Olympic qualification tournament.

== Governing body ==
Polish Rugby Union (Polski Związek Rugby) was founded in 1957, and joined the International Rugby Football Board in 1988. The official supplier of equipment to the PRU is the Polish company Gonga.

An earlier Polish Rugby Union was set up in the early 1920s, but was disbanded in 1928.

== History ==
In 1921, Louis Amblard, a Frenchman, set up the very first Polish rugby club called White Eagles (Białe Orły). The first match was in 1922, and the first club international in 1924 against a Romanian side.

The game became established in the Warsaw Military Academy in the early 1930s.

The tragic events of World War II and the Molotov–Ribbentrop Pact meant that the growth of Polish rugby was retarded until the 1950s. During World War II, there were occasional games between allied POWs in German camps in Poland. For example, a game was held between a Scottish and a Welsh XV, in ten inches of snow. No conversions were allowed, as the ball would have gone over the camp fence, and the game was twenty minutes each way. Players wore army boots, trousers, prison shirts and balaclavas.

Polish rugby arguably achieved its greatest success in the late 1970s when the national team beat Italy, Spain and the USSR, and also held Romania to a 37–21 win in 1977.

"Much to everyone's surprise, Eastern Bloc countries are among the game's vigorous participants, seemingly oblivious to rugby's capitalist class-ridden origins. Russia emerged from behind the Iron Curtain and came under international scrutiny when they played France in Toulouse in November 1978. Romania, Poland and Czechoslovakia are members of the Federation Internationale de Rugby Amateur, the governing body for those countries not in the IB."

In 1983, Poland failed to play Italy in the FIRA Championships, and told FIRA that two of their players had died. It is not known where the other died, but one had died near Bucharest.

The Cold War frequently intruded – for example in the 1984 FIRA Championships, in the game against France, Poland demanded the removal of the French players Didier Camberabero, Henri Sanz and the Brive RFC centre Yves Fouget, because as members of the French armed forces, they were considered to be a security risk.

Because of high Polish emigration, particularly to France, and English speaking nations, the Polish team actually has a fairly large pool of potential players. In addition, a number of Poles returning from jobs in the British Isles and France, have carried the game back with them.

There are currently three divisions in Poland. The second division was relaunched in 2009 using some of the major teams providing 2nd XVs, along with some newly formed sides. The top division has 8 teams while the second division has 6 teams. Prior to that in 2008/2009 there were 10 teams in the top division and only 4 in the second. This led to some very uneven contests between the top teams and those at the bottom of the league. There is now also a regional league played in the centre of Poland (around Lodz and Warsaw) in which some smaller clubs have entered teams and second teams from some of the top clubs nationally compete.

Polish rugby development, however, has tended to concentrate on rugby sevens as a means of introducing the sport to people. The PRU organises regular one day sevens tournaments over the spring/summer with teams travelling from all over the country. There are teams forming all over the country, but there is a shortage of quality coaching and basic equipment. Despite this rugby is making good headway.

Rugby tens also has some popularity in Poland.

== National team ==
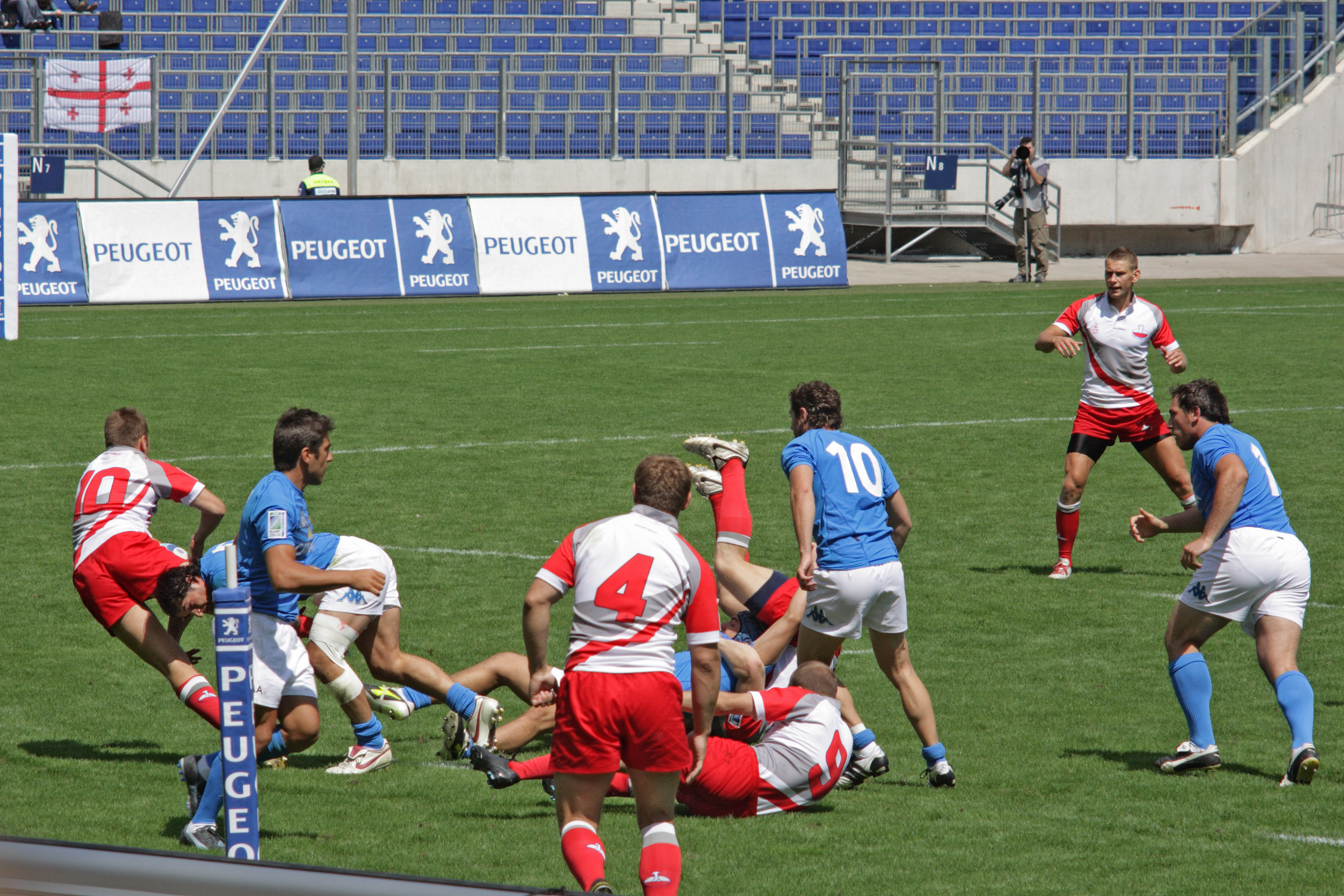
Italy vs Poland, 2008 European Rugby Sevens

Poland's international debut was in 1958 against East Germany, and they won the match, 9–8.

They compete in the second division competition Rugby Europe Trophy, where the winner is promoted to the Premier Division Rugby Europe Championship. In 2018, Poland competed against Portugal, Netherlands, Czech Republic, Switzerland, and Maldova.

In 2018, the Polish XV Men's team was ranked 35 in the world. They also compete in the VII's Europe Grand Prix 7s Series.

Women's Polish Rugby compete in the Women's 7s GPS, where they play other European countries, such as Ireland, Wales, Scotland, Italy, France, Russia and Germany

== Notable players ==
In the 1990s, there were at least fifty Poles playing in the French first and second divisions. Notable amongst these was Grzegorz Kacala, the 114-kilogram (18.0 st) open side flanker, who helped Brive win the 1996 European Cup.

Mariusz Pudzianowski, better known as a Polish strongman, is one of the most famous Polish rugby players. He played with Budowlani Lodz but retired after one season.

== Men's rugby ==
=== XV Rugby ===
==== Ekstraliga ====
Rugby Ekstraliga Teams

- Budowlani SA Łódź
- Lechia Gdańsk
- Orkan Sochaczew
- KS Budowlani Łódź
- Arka Gdynia
- Pogoń Siedlce
- Ogniwo Sopot
- Budowlani Lublin
- Skra Warszawa
- Juvenia Kraków

==== Liga I ====
Teams

- Sparta Jarocin
- Wataha Zielona Góra
- Arka Rumia
- AZS AWF Warszawa
- Rugby Ruda Śląska
- Legia Warszawa

==== Liga II ====
II liga Rugby Teams

- Chaos Poznan
- Mazovia Minsk Mazowiecki
- Copper Lubin
- Alfa Bydgoszcz
- Rugby Bialystok
- Unia Brześć / Terespol

=== Seven's Rugby ===
Teams.

- Posnania Poznań
- Lechia Gdańsk
- GTR Tytan Gniezno
- Juvenia Kraków
- RC Orkan Sochaczew
- AZS AWFiS Gdańsk
- Rugby Bełchatów
- Werewolves Wąbrzeźno
- Rugby Team Olsztyn
- Kaskada Szczecin
- Szarża Grudziądz
- Budowlani Łódź SA
- KS Budowlani Łódź

== Women's rugby ==
Although Poland's women have not yet played test match rugby, they have been playing international sevens rugby since 2005. (Current playing record).

=== Seven's Rugby ===
Teams.

- Biało-Zielone Ladies Gdańsk
- Black Roses Posnania Poznań
- Legia Warszawa
- Juvenia Kraków
- AZS AWF Warszawa
- Legia II Warszawa
- Miedziowe Lubin
- KS Rugby Gierzwałd
- Flota Gdynia
- Diablice Ruda Śląska
- Tygrysice Orkan Sochaczew

== Youth and children's rugby ==
Poland rugby has a youth tournament for different age groups.

=== XV and Seven's Rugby ===
Teams

- UKS Piątka Wilda Poznań
- KS BBRC Łódź
- UKS Karb przy MDK 2 Bytom
- UKS Cisowa Arka Gdynia
- UKS Dziesiątka Gdynia
- UKS Gorce Raba Niżna
- SP Grodysławice
- Hegemon Akademia Rugby
- UKS Kadet Rachanie
- UKS Koziołki Jerzykowo-Biskupice
- UKS Rugby Lubień
- KS Marlin Ozorków
- Miejski Klub Rugby Siedlce
- KR Owal Leszno
- UKS Osiemdziesiątka Sochaczew
- UKS Rugby Czeczewo
- Rugby Gorzów Wielkopolski
- UKS Strzałka
- SP Wożuczyn
- UKS Żaczek Michalów

== Skill standard ==
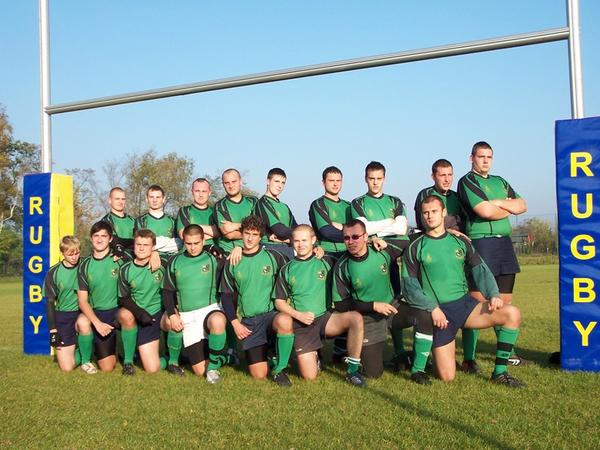
Częstochowa rugby team, and mascot

The standard of domestic rugby is relatively low in Poland. Most national players play in lower division teams in France (even in second/third teams) while some national players play in the domestic league. The main teams are based in the three main conurbations of Tricity, in Warsaw and Łódź (the latter, being current national champions). In Poland, because rugby union is viewed as a "power sport", flamboyance is not encouraged. The lack of foreign coaches stifles development, which is reflected by the national team's performances in the European Nations Cup against nations with less financial muscle and a smaller player pool such as the Czech Republic and the Ukraine, as well as matches against Kazakhstan, and Morocco.

== See also ==
- Poland national rugby union team
- Poland national rugby sevens team
- Poland women's national rugby sevens team
- Ekstraliga
- I liga Rugby
- II liga Rugby
