= RC Lechia Gdańsk =

Polish rugby union club, based in Gdańsk

(Poland) Lechia Gdańsk
- Union: Polish Rugby Union
- Nickname(s): Gdańskie Lwy (Gedanian Lions); Pasiaki (The stripes); Władcy Północy (Rulers of the North); Biało-Zieloni (White-Greens); Lechiści (Lechistas)
- Founded: 1 May 1956; 69 years ago as "BKS Lechia"; 1954 as "TWF" (unofficial)
- Location: Gdańsk, Poland
- Ground: Gdańsk Athletics and Rugby Stadium (Capacity: 924)
- Chairman: (Poland) Bogdan Jancen
- Coach: (Republic of Ireland) Sana Govender
- League: Rugby Ekstraliga
1st kit	2nd kit

Official website
- www.lechiarugby.pl

Lechia Gdańsk is a Polish rugby union team that plays in the Rugby Ekstraliga, the premier rugby union league in Poland. It is one of the oldest and most successful teams in Polish rugby.

== History ==
In early days of Polish rugby in 1950's Gdańsk was one of the epicentres of the sport, mainly of interest among students. The very first 2 teams were "AZS Politechnika", the team representing the Gdańsk Polytechnic and the "Technikum Wychowania Fizycznego" team, the team of the Technical Sports College, abbreviated to "TWF". The main driving force behind the TWF team was a man named Henryk Hodiak. When in 1955 rugby became recognised by the Minister of Sport and a national rugby federation was set up, it allowed the start registration process of teams. When "AZS Politechnika" became one of the first teams to register, Hodiak started to look to register his own team in one of the local sports clubs. Thanks to Sławomir Zieleniewski, an activist at BKS Lechia and a lecturer at TWF, and Stanisław Michowski, the headmaster of TWF, talks began with Stefan Kowalski, the director of Lechia.

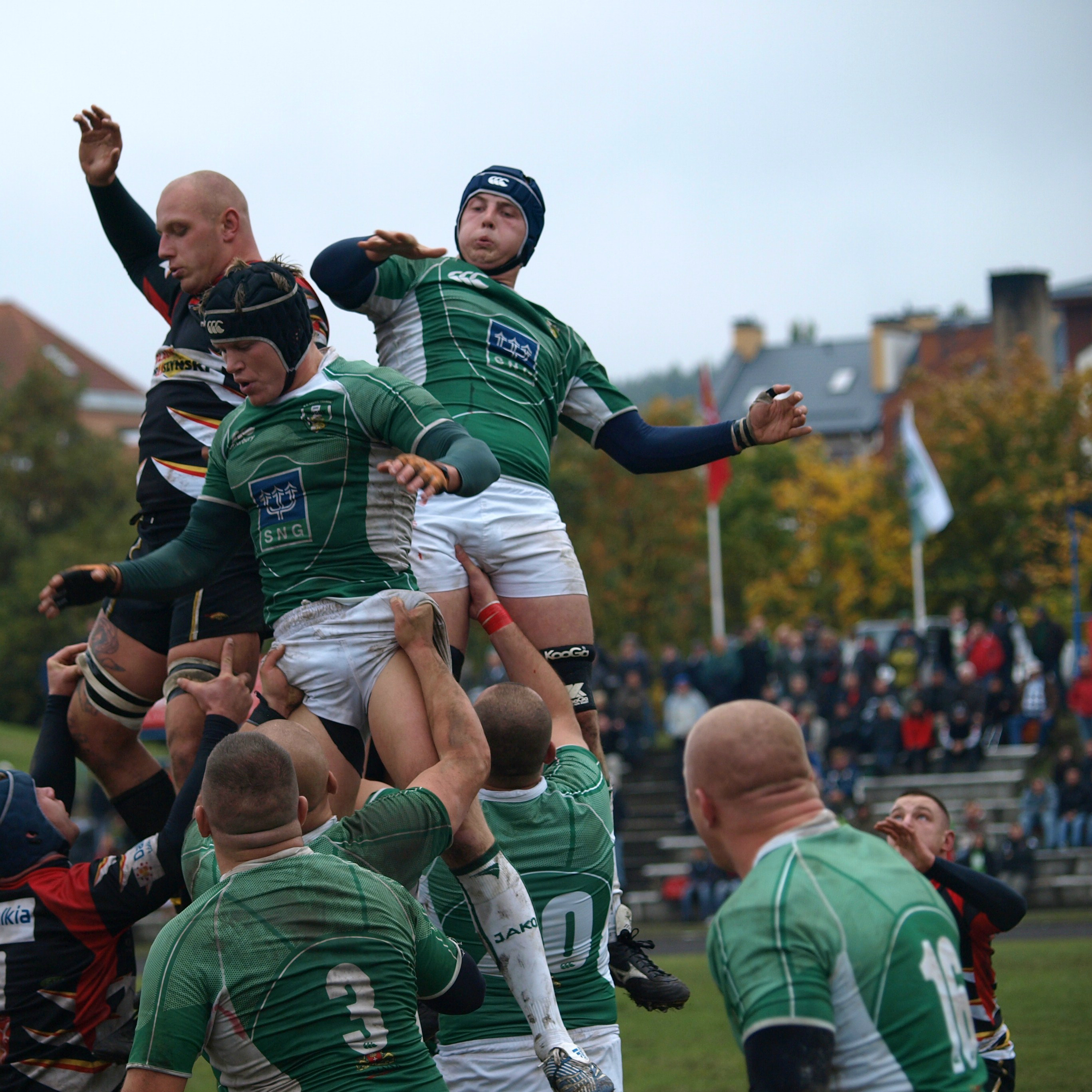
RC Lechia Gdańsk - KS Budowlani Łódź, 11 October 2009

The club was officially set up on 1 May 1956. The bulk of team was composed of TWF students, strengthened by Lechia players from other sections of the club. The first match was against the aforementioned Politechnic. The friendly match took place on 21 September 1956 with a disputed result of 14:0 win over AZS, which was disputed due to claims that no one was keeping score.

Poland's first ever rugby season was in 1956 between September and December. There was no national league but only 5 regional divisions which were meant to determine who shall play in the top flight which was to be established later on. Lechia's first official match was played against Stal Gdańsk on 16 September 1956 and finished in a 6:6 draw. Few days later on 1 November Lechia won their first official match 6:3, away against Goplania Inowrocław.

After that Lechia began to play in national competitions, and whereas most other teams quickly folded after the initial first few seasons, Lechia went to win numerous titles, and remain to this day the only team never to have been relegated from the top division.

== Honours ==
=== Senior ===
- Polish Championship Winners (13): 1960, 1961, 1970, 1994, 1995, 1996, 1998, 1999–00, 2000–01, 2001–02, 2011–12, 2012–13, 2013–14
- Polish Championship Runners-up (11): 1963, 1971–72, 1972–73, 1981–82, 1985, 1986, 1991, 1993, 1997, 2009–10, 2015–16
- Polish Championship 3rd place (15): 1962, 1967, 1968, 1969, 1973–74, 1976–77, 1980–81, 1987, 1988, 1998–99, 2003–04, 2007–08, 2008–09, 2010–11, 2014–15
- Polish Cup Winners (12): 1977, 1984, 1985, 1986, 1994, 1996, 1997, 2004, 2005, 2006, 2008, 2013

=== Junior ===
- Polish Championship Winners: 1960, 1967, 1980, 1998
- Polish Championship Runners-up: 1959, 1961, 1962, 1976, 2012
- Polish Championship 3rd place: 1988, 1991, 1992, 1996

== League History ==
Season	League	Position	Played	W	D	L	Pts F	Pts A	Pts
1958	I liga	10	18	3	2	13	68	221	24
1959	I liga	7	11	5	2	4	57	71	24
1960	I liga	1	14	10	2	2	116	64	36
1961	I liga	1	15	14	0	1	311	45	43
1962	I liga	3	8	5	0	3	129	53	18
1963	I liga	2	6	3	0	3	61	73	12
1964	I liga	4	7	1	2	4	55	103	11
1965	I liga	4	10	3	0	7	108	128	16
1966	I liga	4	10	4	0	6	127	144	18
1967	I liga	3	12	7	0	5	137	116	26
1968	I liga	3	12	6	1	5	111	118	25
1969	I liga	3	14	9	1	4	172	89	33
1970	I liga	1	16	15	0	1	263	84	46
1971	Puchar Polski	2	9	7	0	2	151	47	23
1971–72	I liga	2	20	15	1	4	278	180	51
1972–73	I liga	2	20	14	1	5	528	187	49
1973–74	I liga	3	20	9	3	8	223	204	41
1974–75	I liga	4	20	10	0	10	277	253	39
1975–76	I liga	6	14	5	1	8	144	194	25
1976–77	I liga	3	14	10	0	4	248	128	34
1977–78	I liga	5	14	6	0	8	201	287	26
1978–79	I liga	5	14	5	2	7	269	246	25
1979–80	I liga	7	14	4	0	10	155	226	22
1980–81	I liga	3	14	9	0	5	191	140	32
1981–82	I liga	2	16	11	0	5	278	173	38
1983	I liga	6	14	5	1	8	255	193	25
1984	I liga	4	14	8	0	6	176	167	30
1985	I liga	2	14	9	2	3	205	96	34
1986	I liga	2	18	15	0	3	360	139	48
1987	I liga	3	17	9	1	7	272	216	36
1988	I liga	3	17	14	0	3	401	156	44
1989	I liga	5	14	9	0	5	269	214	32
1990	I liga	6	14	6	1	7	213	209	27
1991	I liga	2	12	8	1	3	272	134	29
1992	I liga	4	14	4	2	8	262	211	24
1993	I liga	2	16	11	2	3	350	176	40
1994	I liga	1	16	15	0	1	464	117	46
1995	I liga	1	14	12	0	2	574	171	38
1996	I liga	1	16	13	0	3	560	199	42
1997	I liga	2	16	11	0	5	565	262	38
1998	I liga	1	10	8	0	2	369	160	26
1998–99	I liga	3	14	10	0	4	536	225	34
1999–2000	I liga	1	14	12	0	2	447	123	38
2000–01	I liga	1	16	15	0	1	606	194	46
2001–02	I liga	1	18	15	1	2	557	196	49
2002–03	I liga	4	16	10	0	6	410	324	36
2003–04	I liga	3	16	11	1	4	475	238	39
2004–05	I liga	4	16	9	1	6	426	207	35
2005–06	I liga	5	18	11	0	7	490	265	40
2006–07	I liga	4	18	14	0	4	425	269	44
2007–08	I liga	3	18	11	1	6	565	221	59
2008–09	I liga	3	18	14	0	4	684	206	70
2009–10	I liga	2	14	10	0	4	348	162	50
2010–11	I liga	3	14	11	0	3	496	186	54
2011–12	I liga	1	14	11	0	3	613	191	55
2012–13	I liga	1	14	10	0	4	549	185	52
2013–14	I liga	1	14	11	0	3	545	217	52
2014–15	I liga	3	19	8	1	10	517	384	32
2015–16	I liga	2	14	12	0	2	603	202	60
2016–17	I liga	4	14	7	0	7	371	295	35
2018	I liga	4	18	10	0	8	453	391	49
2019	I liga	9	9	2	1	6	168	255	11
2019–20 (Note: The 2019–20 season was cancelled due to the coronavirus pandemic after 8 games.)	I liga	6	8	3	0	5	187	156	17
2020–21	I liga	6	18	7	1	10	454	488	42
2021–22	I liga	4	18	11	1	6	499	436	59
2022–23	I liga	5	18	8	0	10	527	507	43

== Rugby sevens ==
RC Lechia Gdańsk sevens is the rugby sevens section of Lechia Gdańsk formed in 1996. The team is one of the most successful in Polands Rugby 7's championships, finishing in the top 3 in every season they have participated.

The Lechia Gdańsk sevens team was created to take part in the newly formed Polish Rugby 7's Championships which took place in 1996. In the first championship Lechia performed strongly finishing in 3rd place, repeating the feat the following year. Despite Lechia starting strongly in the Polish championships first two seasons, the team was removed from the Lechia Rugby club from 1998 until returning in 2009. Upon Lechias return the team in 2009, the team once again showed their quality finishing as runners-up.

Lechia won their first Polish Rugby 7's championship the following year in 2010, beating AZS-AWF Warsaw in the final. This win saw the toppling of AZS-AWF Warsaw being Polands dominant team and saw Lechia rising to take their place. Lechia won 7 championships in a row from 2010–2016 until their domination came to an end with defeat to Posnania in the final in 2017. Lechia returned to the top of the sport the following year, winning a record equalling 8th championship (shared with AZS-AWF Warsaw) after a closely fought final with Posnania.

After their record equalling season, the Lechia sevens team were once again removed from the league system for the next three years, returning again in 2021 when they secured a third-place finish.

=== Honours ===
Polish Rugby Sevens Championship

- Winners (8): 2010, 2011, 2012, 2013, 2014, 2015, 2016, 2018
- Runners-up (2): 2009, 2017
- Third place (3): 1996, 1997, 2021–22

== See also ==
- Rugby union in Poland
- Rugby Ekstraliga
