= 2016–17 Rugby Europe Conference =

Rugby Championship

- Date: 3 September 2016 – 6 May 2017
- Countries: 20

Tournament statistics
- Champions: Czech Republic (2nd title)
- Grand Slam: Czech Republic (2); Hungary (1)
- Matches played: 36
- Attendance: 25,020 (695 per match)
- Tries scored: 237 (6.58 per match)
- Top point scorer(s): Conference 1 (Israel) Ori Abutbul (60); Conference 2 (Hungary) Gregorie Collet (48)
- Top try scorer(s): Conference 1 (Malta) James Kirk (7); Conference 2 (Hungary) Gregorie Collet (6)
- Official website: Rugby International Championship

The 2016–17 Rugby Europe Conference is the third-level rugby union competition below the premier Championship and Trophy competitions. It is the inaugural Conference under its new format, that will see Andorra, Croatia, Cyprus, Czech Republic, Israel, Latvia, Lithuania, Luxembourg, Malta and Sweden compete for the Conference 1 title. While Austria, Bosnia and Herzegovina, Denmark, Estonia, Finland, Hungary, Norway, Serbia, Slovenia and Turkey will compete for the Conference 2 title.

The winners of Conference 1 North and South will play an additional match, a promotion play-off to the Trophy competition for the 2017–18 season. While the bottom placed teams of Conference 1 North and South will be relegated to Conference 2 for the following season, replacing the North and South winners of Conference 2. The team with the worst record in an aggregated Conference 2 table, will be relegated to the Development league for the following season.

== Conference 1 ==
=== North ===
==== Table ====
Champions and advances to
Promotion play-off
Relegated

| Place | Nation | Games | | | | Points | | | Try BP | Losing BP | Grand Slam BP | Table points |
| Place | Nation | played | won | drawn | lost | for | against | difference | Try BP | Losing BP | Grand Slam BP | Table points |
|---|---|---|---|---|---|---|---|---|---|---|---|---|
| 1 | Czech Republic | 4 | 4 | 0 | 0 | 158 | 26 | +132 | 3 | 0 | 0 | 19 |
| 2 | Lithuania | 4 | 3 | 0 | 1 | 93 | 47 | +46 | 2 | 0 | 0 | 14 |
| 3 | Latvia | 4 | 2 | 0 | 2 | 56 | 98 | −42 | 0 | 1 | 0 | 9 |
| 4 | Sweden | 4 | 1 | 0 | 3 | 56 | 124 | −68 | 1 | 1 | 0 | 6 |
| 5 | Luxembourg | 4 | 0 | 0 | 4 | 39 | 107 | −68 | 0 | 1 | 0 | 1 |
Points were awarded to the teams as follows: Win – 4 points Draw – 2 points At least 3 more tries than opponent- 1 point Loss within 8 points – 1 point Loss greater than 8 points – 0 points Completing a Grand Slam – 2 points (will not be counted towards World Cup Qualification)

==== Fixtures ====
| 3 September 2016 | Sweden | 14–56 | Czech Republic | Enköpings Rugbyklubb, Enkoping |
| 15:00 CEST (UTC+02) | Try: Theuri Njuru 72' c Nave Bobby 79' c Con: Conor Murphy (2/2) 73', 79'; Cards: Måns Derl (yellow card) 20' to 30' | Match details | Try: Vojtěch Havel 7' c, 23' c, 60' c Martin Charvát 18' c Aleš Stejskal 36' c Jiří Pantůček 48' c Martin Wognitch 70' c Jan Olbrich 76' c Con: Tomáš Forst (8/8) 8', 19', 24', 37', 48', 61', 71', 77'; Cards: Ondřej Kutil (yellow card) 64' to 74' | Attendance: 400; Referee: Maxime Burlet (Belgium) |

| 22 October 2016 | Latvia | 31–24 | Luxembourg | Jelgava Stadium, Jelgava |
| 15:00 | Try: Emīls Balodis 10'; Valters Raņķis 16'; Guntis Cirša 26'; Elmārs Šefanovskis 44'; Robert Davidsons 67'; Con: Roberts Davidsons 17', 27', 45' | Report | Try: Saman Rezapour 19'; Jean-Baptiste Vert 30' (matchsheet error with Dozin); William Dennis 48'; Jean-Baptiste Vert 55'; Con: William Browne 31', 56' | Attendance: 450; Referee: (Czech Republic) T. Tuma |

| 5 November 2016 | Lithuania | 11–6 | Latvia | Darius and Girėnas Stadium, Kaunas |
| 15:00 EET (UTC+02) | Try: Donatas Vilimavicius 73'; Pen: Kestutis Marcisauskas 15'; Dovydas Taujanskas 80' | Report | Pen: Roberts Džo Davidsons 28', 78' | Attendance: 500; Referee: (Russia) Artur Kaptyukh |

| 5 November 2016 | Luxembourg | 0–19 | Sweden | Stade Josy Barthel, Luxembourg City |
| 16:00 | | Report | Try: James Darbyshire 6'; Henning Ekstrand 14'; Fredrik Enstad 27'; Con: Neill Erasmus 15', 28' | Attendance: 1,200; Referee: (Italy) Trentin Luca |

| 12 November 2016 | Czech Republic | 15–6 | Lithuania | Rugby Club Tatra Smichov, Prague |
| 14:00 CET (UTC+01) | Try: Jan Rohlík 2'; Lukáš Rapant 8'; Con: Tomáš Forst 9'; Pen: Tomáš Forst 66'; Cards: Lukáš Rapant (yellow card) 62' to 72' | Report | Pen: Donatas Vilimavicius 49', 63' | Attendance: 1,500; Referee: (Georgia (country)) Nika Amashukelli |

| 15 April 2017 | Czech Republic | 54–3 | Latvia | Stadion ragby Císařka, Prague |
| 14:00 CEST (UTC+02) |

| 22 April 2017 | Lithuania | 24–12 | Luxembourg | Vingis Park Rugby Stadium, Vilnius |
| 15:00 EEST (UTC+03) |

| 29 April 2017 | Latvia | 16–9 | Sweden | Daugava Stadium, Riga |

| 6 May 2017 | Sweden | 14–52 | Lithuania | Enköpings Rugbyklubb, Enkoping |
| 15:00 CEST (UTC+02) |

| 6 May 2017 | Luxembourg | 3–33 | Czech Republic | Stade Josy Barthel, Luxembourg City |

=== South ===
==== Table ====
Champions and advances to
Promotion play-off
Relegated

| Place | Nation | Games | | | | Points | | | Try BP | Losing BP | Grand Slam BP | Table points |
| Place | Nation | played | won | drawn | lost | for | against | difference | Try BP | Losing BP | Grand Slam BP | Table points |
|---|---|---|---|---|---|---|---|---|---|---|---|---|
| 1 | Malta | 4 | 3 | 1 | 0 | 147 | 49 | +98 | 3 | 0 | 0 | 17 |
| 2 | Israel | 4 | 3 | 0 | 1 | 135 | 100 | +35 | 2 | 0 | 0 | 14 |
| 3 | Croatia | 3 | 1 | 1 | 1 | 77 | 52 | +25 | 1 | 1 | 0 | 8 |
| 4 | Andorra | 4 | 1 | 0 | 3 | 62 | 181 | −119 | 0 | 0 | 0 | 4 |
| 5 | Cyprus | 3 | 0 | 0 | 3 | 45 | 84 | −39 | 0 | 1 | 0 | 1 |
Points were awarded to the teams as follows: Win – 4 points Draw – 2 points At least 3 more tries than opponent- 1 point Loss within 8 points – 1 point Loss greater than 8 points – 0 points Completing a Grand Slam – 2 points (will not be counted towards World Cup Qualification)

==== Fixtures ====
| 22 October 2016 | Andorra | 15–63 | Malta | Estadi Nacional, Andorra La Vella |
| 18:00 CEST (UTC+02) | Try: Albert Canturri 52'; Marc Torrent 72'; Con: Marc Abello 52'; Pen: Marc Abello 5' | Report | Try: Thomas Holloway 14'; James Kirk 24', 28', 42', 48'; Daniel Apsee 39', 46'; Toby Quarendon 63'; Luke Watts 76'; Con: James Morris 15', 25', 29', 43', 47', 77'; Pen: James Morris 3', 10'; Cards: Isaac Bezzina (yellow card) 70' to 80' | Attendance: 400; Referee: (Italy) R. Angelucci |

| 29 October 2016 | Malta | 31–3 | Cyprus | Hibernians Stadium, Paola |
| 14:00 CEST (UTC+02) | Try: James Morris 40'; James Kir 45', 53'; Rory O'Brien 71'; Daniel Apsee 82'; Con: James Morris 41', 45', 83'; Cards: Matthew Spiteri (yellow card) 65' to 75' | Report | Pen: Alex Zavallis 35'; Cards: Matthew King (yellow card) 80' to 83' | Referee: (Israel) Ariel Cabral |

| 29 October 2016 | Croatia | 47–15 | Andorra | Stari plac Stadium, Split |
| 16:00 | Try: Srđan Majkić 2', 9'; Tomislav Burazin 6', 18'; Mario Ozich 15'; Jay Ayoub 33', 55'; Con: Jay Ayoub 3', 6', 10', 16', 34', 56'; Cards: Dominik Draženović (yellow card) 24' to 34'; Luka Perlain (yellow card) 46' to 56' | Report | Try: Fanck Mitjana 51', 76'; Con: Marc Abello 52'; Pen: Benjamin Fajol 1'; Cards: Edisher Jamrulidze (yellow card) 23' to 33'; Peter Ambor (yellow card) 46' to 56' | Attendance: 1,000; Referee: (Romania) Ionut Bodea |

| 5 November 2016 | Israel | 23–16 | Croatia | Wingate Institute, Netanya |
| 14:00 IST (UTC+02) | Try: Amit Kakoun 4'; Gilad Goldstein 31'; Jonathan Radashkovich 38'; Con: Ori Abutbul 31'; Pen: Ori Abutbul 19', 57' | Report | Try: Dylan Rowe 72'; Con: Jay Ayoub 72'; Pen: Jai Ayoub 18', 28', 47' | Attendance: 1,700; Referee: (Belgium) John Catteau |

| 12 November 2016 | Cyprus | 28–38 | Israel | Pafiako Stadium, Paphos |
| 14:30 EET (UTC+02) | Try: Andrew Fell 12'; Marcus Holden 26'; Luke Peters 41'; Con: Marcus Holden 12', 41'; Pen: Marcus Holden 25', 39', 69' | Report | Try: Jonathan Radashkovich 2'; Amit Kakoun 17'; Thomas Burden 32'; Ori Abutbul 60', 62'; Guy Matisis 78'; Con: Ori Abutbul 32'; Pen: Ori Abutbul 48', 85' | Attendance: 500; Referee: (Czech Republic) Matéj Rázga |

| 11 February 2017 | Andorra | 15–14 | Cyprus | Estadi Nacional, Andorra La Vella |
| 18:00 CET (UTC+01) |

| 8 April 2017 | Israel | 57–17 | Andorra | Wingate Institute, Netanya |
| 14:00 IST (UTC+02) |

| 22 April 2017 | Malta | 39–17 | Israel | Hibernians Stadium, Paola |
| 14:00 CET (UTC+01) |

| 29 April 2017 | Croatia | 14–14 | Malta | TBA |
| | | | | Attendance: 1,500 |

| 6 May 2017 | Cyprus | 27–29 | Croatia | Pafiako Stadium, Paphos |
| 15:00 EEST (UTC+03) | | http://www.rugbyeurope.eu/sites/default/files/document/170429_reic_conference_1_sud_crovmal_gamesheet.pdf |

== Conference 2 ==
=== North ===
==== Table ====
Champions
Possibly relegated

| Place | Nation | Games | | | | Points | | | Try BP | Losing BP | Grand Slam BP | Table points |
| Place | Nation | played | won | drawn | lost | for | against | difference | Try BP | Losing BP | Grand Slam BP | Table points |
|---|---|---|---|---|---|---|---|---|---|---|---|---|
| 1 | Denmark | 4 | 3 | 0 | 1 | 161 | 42 | +119 | 3 | 0 | 0 | 15 |
| 2 | Hungary | 3 | 3 | 0 | 0 | 120 | 25 | +95 | 2 | 0 | 0 | 14 |
| 3 | Finland | 3 | 1 | 0 | 2 | 87 | 107 | −20 | 1 | 0 | 0 | 5 |
| 4 | Norway | 3 | 1 | 0 | 2 | 55 | 93 | −38 | 0 | 0 | 0 | 4 |
| 5 | Estonia | 3 | 0 | 0 | 3 | 23 | 179 | −156 | 0 | 0 | 0 | 0 |
Points were awarded to the teams as follows: Win – 4 points Draw – 2 points At least 3 more tries than opponent- 1 point Loss within 8 points – 1 point Loss greater than 8 points – 0 points Completing a Grand Slam – 2 points (will not be counted towards World Cup Qualification)

==== Fixtures ====
| 1 October 2016 | Estonia | 5–53 | Hungary | Kalevi Keskstaadion, Tallinn |
| 14:00 EEST (UTC+03) | Try: Marten Martinson 50'; Cards: Pedro Maria Galladro Mateos (yellow card) 55' to 65' | Report | Try: Gregorie Collet 16', 25', 58'; Kornél Kiss 19'; Dávid Drabbant 54', 71'; Ákos Ágotai 77'; Con: Gregorie Collet 17', 19', 58', 72', 77'; Martin Sacase 25'; Pen: Gregorie Collet 14', 23' | Attendance: 200; Referee: (Russia) George Kopp |

| 8 October 2016 | Norway | 48–31 | Finland | Bislett Stadium, Oslo |
| 14:00 CEST (UTC+02) | Try: Stewart Elliot 20', 79'; Mickael Guardia 25', 54'; Penalty Try 62'; Tobias Nygaard 67'; James Buncle 72'; Con: Adam Jones 21'; Nathan Cummins 55', 62', 73', 80'; Pen: Nathan Cummins 33' | Report | Try: Julius Kekeläinen 5'; Jussi Viljanen 17'; Mauno Konttila 29'; Philip Sleath 35'; Henri Repo 43'; Con: Jussi Viljanen 5', 18', 30'; Cards: Mauno Konttila (yellow card) 68' to 78' | Referee: (Portugal) Alfonso Nogueria |

| 8 October 2016 | Hungary | 25–13 | Denmark | RCH Stadion, Esztergom |
| 15:00 CEST (UTC+02) | Try: Jonatán Katona 28'; Dávid Drabbant 39'; Thomas Ducrocq 45'; Con: Martin Sacase 29'; Gregorie Collet 40'; Pen: Martin Sacase 10', 16'; Cards: Szabolcs Pocskai (yellow card) 80' to 80' | Report | Try: Nicklas Tell 73'; Con: Peder Bjerrum 73'; Pen: Peder Bjerrum 13', 47' | Referee: (Croatia) H. Bartoli |

| 22 October 2016 | Finland | 51–6 | Estonia | Myllypuro sports park, Helsinki |
| 13:00 EEST (UTC+03) | Try: Ossi Aro 2'; Samu-Petteri Pääkkö 17'; Jussi Viljanen 32', 60', 74'; Matti Keränen 41'; Antti Lammi 63'; Richard Hennessy 72'; Con: Henri Repo 61', 64', 73', 75'; Pen: Jussi Viljanen 37' | Report | Pen: Luke Veebel 9', 35'; Cards: Jaan Lorens (yellow card) 31' to 41' | Attendance: 300; Referee: (Lithuania) R. Grumbinas |

| 22 October 2016 | Denmark | 20–0 | Norway | Odense Atletikstadion, Odense |
| 16:00 CEST (UTC+02) | Try: Tomas Mayne 22'; Nicklas Tell 30'; Agbeko Hounou 34'; Con: Joshua Jensen 30'; Pen: Thomas Thimotee; Cards: Mikkel Jensen (yellow card) 80' to 83'; Malte Madsen (yellow card) 83' to 83' | Report | Cards: Andrew Fraser-Smith (yellow card) 66' to 76' | Attendance: 500; Referee: (Germany) Dan Maughan |

| 22 April 2017 | Denmark | 53–5 | Finland | Odense Atletikstadion, Odense |
| 16:00 CEST (UTC+02) |

| 22 April 2017 | Hungary | 42–7 | Norway | TBA |

| 29 April 2017 | Estonia | 12–75 | Denmark | Kalevi Keskstaadion, Tallinn |
| 14:00 EEST (UTC+03) |

| 6 May 2017 | Finland | 5–37 | Hungary | Myllypuro sports park, Helsinki |
| 13:00 EEST (UTC+03) |

| 6 May 2017 | Norway | 43–16 | Estonia | International School of Stavanger, Stavanger |
| 14:00 CEST (UTC+02) |

=== South ===
==== Table ====
Champions and Promoted
Relegated

| Place | Nation | Games | | | | Points | | | Try BP | Losing BP | Grand Slam BP | Table points |
| Place | Nation | played | won | drawn | lost | for | against | difference | Try BP | Losing BP | Grand Slam BP | Table points |
|---|---|---|---|---|---|---|---|---|---|---|---|---|
| 1 | Bosnia and Herzegovina | 4 | 3 | 0 | 1 | 90 | 54 | +36 | 0 | 1 | 0 | 13 |
| 2 | Austria | 4 | 3 | 0 | 1 | 79 | 51 | +28 | 0 | 0 | 0 | 12 |
| 3 | Slovenia | 4 | 2 | 0 | 2 | 114 | 48 | +66 | 1 | 1 | 0 | 10 |
| 4 | Serbia | 4 | 2 | 0 | 2 | 77 | 107 | −30 | 1 | 0 | 0 | 9 |
| 5 | Turkey* | 4 | 0 | 0 | 4 | 0 | 100 | −100 | 0 | 0 | 0 | 0 |
Points were awarded to the teams as follows: Win – 4 points Draw – 2 points At least 3 more tries than opponent- 1 point Loss within 8 points – 1 point Loss greater than 8 points – 0 points Completing a Grand Slam – 2 points (will not be counted towards World Cup Qualification)

==== Fixtures ====
| 8 October 2016 | Austria | 29–22 | Bosnia and Herzegovina | Hohe Warte Stadium, Vienna |
| 15:00 CEST (UTC+02) | Try: Christopher Lynton-Evans 52'; Benjamin Preclik 63'; Con: Max Navas 53', 64'; Pen: Max Navas 9', 23', 33', 60', 73'; Cards: Johannes Dachler (yellow card) 85' to 85' | Report | Try: Mahir Bišić 11'; Fadil Spahić 42'; Mirsad Fetić 77'; Con: Sabahudin Subašić 43', 78'; Pen: Sabahudin Subašić 20'; Cards: Mahir Bišić (yellow card) 17' to 27'; Mirsad Fetić (yellow card) 43' to 53'; Edin Pojskić (yellow card) 73' to 83' | Attendance: 700; Referee: (Czech Republic) Stepan Cekal |

| 29 October 2016 | Slovenia | 74–13 | Serbia | ŽŠD Ljubljana Stadium, Ljubljana |
| 14:00 CEST (UTC+02) | Try: Max Nikolei Skofic 10', 41', 67'; Lewis John Catt 23', 36', 60'; Žiga Burnik 40'; George Frederic Skofic 45', 64', 71'; Lovro Sambol 80'; Con: Frank Joseph Skofic 37', 40', 42', 61', 65', 68', 72', 80'; Pen: Žiga Burnik 7' | Report | Try: Nikola Arsić 48'; Con: Michael Brian Kovacic 49'; Pen: Boris Martić 15', 20'; Cards: Milan Marinković (yellow card) 35' to 45' | Attendance: 500; Referee: (Italy) Matteo Liperini |

| 5 November 2016 | Serbia | 25–0* | Turkey | Vojnom Stadionu, Zrenjanin |
| 14:00 CET (UTC+01) |

| 12 November 2016 | Turkey | 0–25* | Austria | TBA |

| 26 November 2016 | Turkey | 0–25* | Slovenia | TBA |

| 4 March 2017 | Bosnia and Herzegovina | 25–0* | Turkey | Stadion Kamberovice Polje, Zenica |
| 14:00 CET (UTC+01) |

| 8 April 2017 | Slovenia | 15–22 | Bosnia and Herzegovina | ŽŠD Ljubljana Stadium, Ljubljana |
| 14:00 CEST (UTC+02) |

| 22 April 2017 | Austria | 13–0 | Slovenia | TBA |
| 17:00 CEST (UTC+02) |

| 22 April 2017 | Bosnia and Herzegovina | 21–10 | Serbia | Stadion Kamberovice Polje, Zenica |
| 15:00 CEST (UTC+02) |

| 29 April 2017 | Serbia | 29–12 | Austria | Rad Stadium, Belgrade |
| 14:00 CEST (UTC+02) |

- Due to financial problems Turkey could not compete. All games are counted as a 25–0 victory for the opposing side

=== Conference 2 aggregate table ===
relegated

| Place | Nation | Games | | | | Points | | | Bonus points | Table points |
| Place | Nation | played | won | drawn | lost | for | against | difference | Bonus points | Table points |
|---|---|---|---|---|---|---|---|---|---|---|
| 1 | Hungary | 2 | 2 | 0 | 0 | 78 | 18 | +60 | 1 | 14 |
| 2 | Slovenia | 2 | 2 | 0 | 0 | 99 | 13 | +86 | 1 | 9 |
| 3 | Austria | 3 | 3 | 0 | 0 | 67 | 22 | +45 | 0 | 12 |
| 4 | Finland | 2 | 1 | 0 | 1 | 82 | 54 | +28 | 1 | 5 |
| 5 | Bosnia and Herzegovina | 2 | 1 | 0 | 1 | 47 | 29 | +18 | 1 | 5 |
| 6 | Norway | 2 | 1 | 0 | 1 | 48 | 51 | −3 | 1 | 5 |
| 7 | Denmark | 2 | 1 | 0 | 1 | 33 | 25 | +8 | 0 | 4 |
| 8 | Serbia | 2 | 1 | 0 | 1 | 38 | 74 | −36 | 0 | 4 |
| 9 | Estonia | 2 | 0 | 0 | 2 | 11 | 104 | −93 | 0 | 0 |
| 10 | Turkey | 4 | 0 | 0 | 4 | 0 | 100 | −100 | 0 | 0 |
Points were awarded to the teams as follows: Win – 4 points Draw – 2 points 4 or more tries – 1 point Loss within 7 points – 1 point Loss greater than 7 points – 0 points

== See also ==
- Rugby Europe International Championships
- 2016–17 Rugby Europe International Championships
- Six Nations Championship
