= 2017–18 Rugby Europe Conference =

- Date: 14 October 2017 – 26 May 2017
- Countries: 20

Tournament statistics
- Champions: Lithuania (1st title)
- Matches played: 40
- Attendance: 29,325 (733 per match)
- Tries scored: 284 (7.1 per match)
- Top point scorer(s): Conference 1 (Malta) James O'Brien (49); Conference 2 (Denmark) Cassius Deschamps (59)
- Top try scorer(s): Conference 1 (Malta) James Kirk (5) (Malta) Luke Watts (5); Conference 2 (Luxembourg) Gauthier Bares (5) (Serbia) Igor Dejanović (5) (Denmark) Christian Melgaard (5)
- Official website: Rugby International Championship

The 2017–18 Rugby Europe Conference is the third-level rugby union competition below the premier Championship and Trophy competitions. It is the second Conference under its new format. After Czech Republic was promoted to the Trophy and Ukraine relegated at the end of the 2016–17 season, Andorra, Bosnia and Herzegovina, Croatia, Hungary, Israel, Latvia, Lithuania, Malta, Sweden and Ukraine compete for the Conference 1 title. While after the relegation of Turkey and the promotion of Slovakia, Austria, Cyprus, Denmark, Estonia, Finland, Luxembourg, Norway, Serbia, Slovenia and Slovakia will compete for the Conference 2 title.

The winners of Conference 1 North and South will play an additional match, a Conference 1-Trophy Promotion play-off for the right to play the 2018–19 Rugby Europe Trophy. While the bottom placed teams of Conference 1 North and South will be relegated to Conference 2 for the following season, replacing the North and South winners of Conference 2. The bottom placed team with the worse overall record will be relegated and participate in the 2019 Rugby Europe Development season.

The competition saw Alhambra Nievas and Joy Neville become the first and second women referees to take charge of men's fifteen–a–side internationals. On 14 October 2017 Nievas refereed the match between Finland and Norway. On 28 October 2017 Neville refereed the match between Norway and Denmark.

== Conference 1 ==
=== North ===
==== Table ====
Champions and advances to
Promotion play-off
Relegated

Place	Nation	Games				Points			Try BP	Losing BP	Grand Slam BP	Table points
Place	Nation	played	won	drawn	lost	for	against	difference	Try BP	Losing BP	Grand Slam BP	Table points
1	Lithuania	4	4	0	0	127	78	+49	2	0	1	19
2	Ukraine	4	2	1	1	92	63	+29	2	0	0	12
3	Sweden	4	2	0	2	92	109	−17	1	0	0	9
4	Hungary	4	0	1	3	60	72	−12	0	3	0	5
5	Latvia	4	1	0	3	72	121	−49	0	0	0	4
Points were awarded to the teams as follows: Win – 4 points Draw – 2 points At least 3 more tries than opponent- 1 point Loss within 7 points – 1 point Loss greater than 7 points – 0 points Completing a Grand Slam – 1 points

==== Fixtures ====
14 October 2017	Sweden	12–10	Hungary	Bollspelaren, Norrköping
15:00 CEST (UTC+02)		Match Report Gamesheet		Attendance: 650; Referee: Philippe Lenne (Belgium)

21 October 2017	Hungary	6–12	Latvia	Frankarénában, Esztergom
12:00 CEST (UTC+02)		Match Report Gamesheet		Attendance: 300; Referee: Tomás Tuma (Czech Republic)

28 October 2017	Ukraine	29–8	Sweden	Spartak Stadium, Odesa
14:00 EEST (UTC+03)		report gamesheet		Attendance: 1500; Referee: Bodea Ionut (Romania)

28 October 2017	Latvia	19–33	Lithuania	Olympic Center, Jelgava
15:00 EEST (UTC+03)		Report Gamesheet		Attendance: 500; Referee: Dan Maughan (Germany)

4 November 2017	Lithuania	22–12	Ukraine	Aukstaitijos Sporto Kompleksas, Panevėžys
14:00 EET (UTC+02)		Gamesheet		Attendance: 500

21 April 2018	Hungary	25–29	Lithuania	Sportközpont, Százhalombatta
12:00 CEST (UTC+02)				Referee: Claudio Blessano (Italy)

28 April 2018	Lithuania	43–22	Sweden	Centrinis stadionas, Telšiai
15:00 EEST (UTC+03)				Referee: Alexei Bryzgalin (Russia)

28 April 2018	Ukraine	19–19	Hungary	Yunost Stadium, Lviv
14:00 EEST (UTC+03)		Gamesheet		Attendance: 300; Referee: Matteo Liperini (Italy)

5 May 2018	Latvia	14–32	Ukraine	Upesciema stadions, Upesciems
15:00 EEST (UTC+03)		Gamesheet		Referee: Hrvoje Bartolic (Croatia)

12 May 2018	Sweden	50-27	Latvia
15:00 CEST (UTC+02)

=== South ===
==== Table ====
Champions and advances to
Promotion play-off
Relegated

Place	Nation	Games				Points			Try BP	Losing BP	Grand Slam BP	Table points
Place	Nation	played	won	drawn	lost	for	against	difference	Try BP	Losing BP	Grand Slam BP	Table points
1	Malta	4	4	0	0	221	48	+173	3	0	1	20
2	Croatia	4	2	1	1	85	97	−12	1	0	0	11
2	Israel	4	2	0	2	105	86	+19	1	1	0	10
4	Bosnia and Herzegovina	4	1	0	3	5	140	−86	0	0	0	4
5	Andorra	4	0	1	3	60	154	−94	0	2	0	4
Points were awarded to the teams as follows: Win – 4 points Draw – 2 points At least 3 more tries than opponent- 1 point Loss within 7 points – 1 point Loss greater than 7 points – 0 points Completing a Grand Slam – 1 points

==== Fixtures ====
21 October 2017	Andorra	22–27	Israel	Estadi Nacional, Andorra la Vella
16:00 CEST (UTC+02)		Report Gamesheet		Attendance: 600; Referee: Yann Benoit (Switzerland)

28 October 2017	Bosnia and Herzegovina	20–52	Malta	Atletski Stadion, Zenica
14:00 CEST (UTC+02)		Report Gamesheet		Referee: Cekal Stepan (Czech Republic)

28 October 2017	Croatia	32–17	Israel	Stadion Stari plac, Split
14:00 CEST (UTC+02)		Report Gamesheet		Attendance: 600; Referee: Matteo Liperini (Italy)

4 November 2017	Malta	56–8	Croatia	Hibernians Stadium, Paola
14:00 CET (UTC+01)		Gamesheet		Attendance: 3000

11 November 2017	Israel	44–8	Bosnia and Herzegovina	Wingate Institute, Netanya
14:00 IST (UTC+02)		Gamesheet		Attendance: 1400

17 March 2018	Israel	17–24	Malta	Wingate Institute, Netanya
14:00 IST (UTC+02)		Gamesheet		Attendance: 500; Referee: Jorge Mopeceres (Spain)

17 March 2018	Bosnia and Herzegovina	20–17	Andorra	Gradska arena, Zenica
14:00 CET (UTC+01)		Gamesheet		Attendance: 500; Referee: Critian Serban (Romania)

24 March 2018	Malta	89–3	Andorra	Hibernians Stadium, Paola
14:00 CET (UTC+01)		Report

28 April 2018	Croatia	27-6	Bosnia and Herzegovina	Stadion NŠC Stjepan Spajić, Zagreb
18:30 CEST (UTC+02)

5 May 2018	Andorra	18-18	Croatia	Estadi Nacional, Andorra la Vella
17:00 CEST (UTC+02)

== Conference 2 ==
=== North ===
==== Table ====
Champions and Promoted
Relegated

Place	Nation	Games				Points			Try BP	Losing BP	Grand Slam BP	Table points
Place	Nation	played	won	drawn	lost	for	against	difference	Try BP	Losing BP	Grand Slam BP	Table points
1	Luxembourg	4	4	0	0	162	24	+138	2	0	1	19
2	Denmark	4	3	0	1	211	45	+166	2	0	0	14
3	Finland	4	2	0	2	107	120	−13	1	0	0	9
4	Norway	4	1	0	3	83	90	−7	1	1	0	6
5	Estonia	4	0	0	4	31	315	−284	0	0	0	0
Points were awarded to the teams as follows: Win – 4 points Draw – 2 points At least 3 more tries than opponent- 1 point Loss within 7 points – 1 point Loss greater than 7 points – 0 points Completing a Grand Slam – 1 points

==== Fixtures ====
14 October 2017	Finland	15–8	Norway	Myllypuro, Helskini
14:00 EEST (UTC+03)		Report Gamesheet		Attendance: 250; Referee: Alhambra Nievas (Spain)

14 October 2017	Denmark	3–18	Luxembourg	Athletics stadium, Odense
16:00 CEST (UTC+02)		Report Gamesheet		Attendance: 1,000; Referee: Rami Aro (Sweden)

28 October 2017	Norway	12–24	Denmark	Bislett Stadium, Oslo
14:00 CEST (UTC+02)		Report Gamesheet		Attendance: 1500; Referee: Joy Neville (Ireland)

11 November 2017	Luxembourg	64–0	Estonia	Stade Josy Barthel, Luxembourg City
16:00 CET (UTC+01)		Gamesheet		Attendance: 600; Referee: Mike Hawkins (Denmark)

14 April 2018	Luxembourg	45–5	Finland	Stade Josy Barthel, Luxembourg City
16:00 CEST (UTC+02)				Attendance: 1,300

28 April 2018	Denmark	127–5	Estonia	Athletics stadium, Odense
15:00 CEST (UTC+02)				Referee: Finlay Brown (Scotland)

28 April 2018	Luxembourg	35–16	Norway	Stade Josy Barthel, Luxembourg City
18:00 CEST (UTC+02)				Referee: Kacper Michialkiewicz (Poland)

12 May 2018	Finland	10-57	Denmark	Myllypuro, Helskini
14:00 EEST (UTC+03)

12 May 2018	Estonia	16-47	Norway
15:00 EEST (UTC+03)

9 June 2018	Estonia	10-77	Finland	Tartu, Estonia
EET (UTC+02)

Notes:

- The Finland v Norway match was notable for being the first time an all female list of referees were chosen to officiate a men's fifteen a side game.
- Originally a home game for Norway, but moved to Luxembourg due to recent cold weather conditions meaning the pitch could not recover in time.

=== South ===
==== Table ====
Champions and Promoted
Possible Relegation

Place	Nation	Games				Points			Try BP	Losing BP	Grand Slam BP	Table points
Place	Nation	played	won	drawn	lost	for	against	difference	Try BP	Losing BP	Grand Slam BP	Table points
1	Cyprus	4	3	0	1	114	51	+63	2	0	0	14
2	Austria	4	3	0	1	110	88	+22	1	0	0	13
3	Serbia	4	2	0	2	131	98	+33	1	1	0	10
4	Slovenia	4	2	0	2	82	75	+7	0	1	0	9
5	Slovakia	4	0	0	4	45	173	−128	0	0	0	0
Points were awarded to the teams as follows: Win – 4 points Draw – 2 points At least 3 more tries than opponent- 1 point Loss within 7 points – 1 point Loss greater than 7 points – 0 points Completing a Grand Slam – 1 points

==== Fixtures ====
21 October 2017	Austria	27–25	Serbia	Sportsklub-Platz, Vienna
18:15 CEST (UTC+02)		report gamesheet		Referee: Csaba Priskin (Hungary)

28 October 2017	Serbia	21–30	Slovenia	Stadion Borca, Starčevo
14:00 CEST (UTC+02)		report		Attendance: 450; Referee: Lukasz Jasinski (Poland)

4 November 2017	Slovenia	29–15	Slovakia	Stadion park Šiška, Ljubljana
14:00 CET (UTC+01)		Gamesheet		Attendance: 600

11 November 2017	Cyprus	42–5	Austria	Stelios Kyriakides Stadium, Paphos
14:30 EET (UTC+02)				Attendance: 1000

25 November 2017	Slovakia	6–38	Cyprus	Štadión PFK, Piešťany
14:00 CET (UTC+01)		Gamesheet		Attendance: 300

24 March 2018	Austria	56–0	Slovakia	Sportsklub-Platz, Vienna
16:00 CET (UTC+01)		Report

24 March 2018	Cyprus	17–5	Slovenia	Stelios Kyriakides Stadium, Paphos
14:30 EET (UTC+02)		Report Gamesheet

7 April 2018	Slovenia	18–22	Austria	Stadion park Šiška, Ljubljana
14:00 CEST (UTC+02)		Gamesheet		Attendance: 225; Referee: Nika Amashukeli (Georgia)

21 April 2018	Slovakia	24–50	Serbia	Štadión PFK, Piešťany
15:00 CEST (UTC+02)		[www.rugbyeurope.eu/sites/default/files/180421_reic_conf2s_skvvsrb_game_sheet_v2.pdf Gamesheet]		Attendance: 250; Referee: David Sutherland (Scotland)

28 April 2018	Serbia	35–17	Cyprus	Makiš Stadium, Belgrade
14:00 CEST (UTC+02)				Referee: Pedro Mendis Silva (Portugal)

== Conference 1 promotion to Trophy play-off ==
19 May 2018

Lithuania	81-10	Malta

Siaulai, Lithuania

== See also ==
- Rugby Europe International Championships
- 2017–18 Rugby Europe International Championships
- Six Nations Championship
