= 2018–19 Rugby Europe Conference =

- Date: 13 October 2018 – 01 June 2019
- Countries: 20

Tournament statistics
- Matches played: 39
- Attendance: 25,307 (649 per match)
- Tries scored: 230 (5.9 per match)
- Top point scorer(s): Conference 1 (Malta) James Kirk (47); Conference 2 (Bulgaria) Petar Nikolov (60)
- Top try scorer(s): Conference 1 (Croatia) Krešimir Čorić (3) (Malta) Christopher Dudman (3) (Sweden) Axel Kalling Smith (3) (Sweden) Conor Murphy (3) (Croatia) Domagoj Plazibat (3); Conference 2 (Bulgaria) Ivayilo Ivanov (4) (Andorra) Edisher Jamrulidze (4) (Slovenia) Blaž Pilko (4)
- Official website: Rugby International Championship

The 2018–19 Rugby Europe Conference is the third-level rugby union competition below the premier Championship and Trophy competitions. It is the third Conference under its new format. After Lithuania was promoted to the Trophy and Moldova relegated at the end of the 2017–18 season, Bosnia and Herzegovina, Croatia, Cyprus, Hungary, Israel, Luxembourg, Malta, Moldova, Sweden and Ukraine compete for the Conference 1 title. While after the relegation of Estonia and the promotion of Bulgaria, Andorra, Austria, Bulgaria, Denmark, Finland, Latvia, Norway, Serbia, Slovakia and Slovenia will compete for the Conference 2 title. Due to the relegation of a Conference 2 North team and the promotion of a Southern team, the Conference 2 Pools had to be reallocated. While Bulgaria joined the Conference 2 South, Austria switched pools to the Conference 2 North, replacing Estonia.

The winners of Conference 1 North and South will play an additional match, a Conference 1-Trophy Promotion play-off for the right to play the 2019–20 Rugby Europe Trophy. While the bottom placed teams of Conference 1 North and South will be relegated to Conference 2 for the following season, replacing the North and South winners of Conference 2. The bottom placed team with the worse overall record will be relegated and participate in the 2019 Rugby Europe Development season.

Ukraine was directly promoted to 2019–20 Rugby Europe Trophy, because Malta was not able to play the Conference 1-Trophy Promotion play-off game.

== Conference 1 ==
=== North ===
==== Table ====
Champions and promoted to
2019–20 Rugby Europe Trophy
Relegated

Place	Nation	Games				Points			Try BP	Losing BP	Grand Slam BP	Table points
Place	Nation	played	won	drawn	lost	for	against	difference	Try BP	Losing BP	Grand Slam BP	Table points
1	Ukraine (37)	4	3	0	1	113	29	+84	1	1	0	14
2	Sweden (56)	4	3	0	1	130	65	+65	1	0	0	13
3	Luxembourg (64)	4	2	0	2	63	59	+4	1	1	0	9
4	Hungary (68)	4	1	0	3	97	118	-21	1	1	0	6
5	Moldova (44)	4	1	0	3	49	147	-98	0	0	0	4
Pre-Tournament rankings in parentheses. Points were awarded to the teams as follows: Win – 4 points : Draw – 2 points : Loss within 7 points – 1 point : Loss greater than 7 points – 0 points: At least 3 more tries than opponent- 1 point Completing a Grand Slam – 1 point

==== Fixtures ====
13 October 2018	Ukraine	24-13	Luxembourg	Yunist' Stadium, Lviv
14:00 EEST (UTC+03)		Gamesheet		Attendance: 250; Referee: (Romania) Cristian Serbian

20 October 2018	(1 TBP) Sweden	80-6	Moldova	Bollspelaren, Norrköping
14:00 CEST (UTC+02)		Gamesheet		Attendance: 400; Referee: (Netherlands) Gert Visser

03 November 2018	Moldova	16-31	Hungary (1 TBP)	Stadionul Raional, Anenii Noi
13:15 EET (UTC+02)		Gamesheet		Attendance: 200; Referee: (Georgia (country)) Tornike Gvirjishvili

03 November 2018	(1 LBP) Luxembourg	9-10	Sweden	Stade Josy Barthel, Luxembourg City
16:00 CET (UTC+01)		Gamesheet		Attendance: 1,400; Referee: (Switzerland) Yann Benoît

10 November 2018	Hungary	24-48	Ukraine (1 TBP)	Városi Szabadidő Központ, Százhalombatta
14:00 CET (UTC+01)		Gamesheet		Attendance: 600; Referee: (Germany) Dan O'Connell

13 April 2019	Luxembourg	23-10	Moldova	Stade Josy Barthel, Luxembourg City
16:00 CEST (UTC+02)		Gamesheet		Attendance: 1,200; Referee: (Germany) Killian O'BRIEN

20 April 2019	Moldova	17-13	Ukraine (1 LBP)	Stadionul Central orașului, Drochia
13:00 EEST (UTC+03)		Gamesheet		Attendance: 500; Referee: (Croatia) Bartolic Hrvoje

04 May 2019	(1 LBP) Hungary	15-18	Luxembourg	Városi Szabadidő Központ, Százhalombatta
14:15 CEST (UTC+02)		Gamesheet		Attendance: 200; Referee: (Portugal) Pedro Cardios M. Silva

11 May 2019	Sweden	36-27	Hungary	Bollspelaren, Norrköping
14:00 CEST (UTC+02)		Gamesheet		Attendance: 600; Referee: (Russia) Alexei Bryzgalin

19 May 2019	Ukraine	23-14	Sweden	Spartak Stadium, Odesa
14:00 EEST (UTC+03)		Gamesheet		Attendance: 2,200; Referee: (Wales) Mike English

=== South ===
==== Table ====
Champions
Relegated

Place	Nation	Games				Points			Try BP	Losing BP	Grand Slam BP	Table points
Place	Nation	played	won	drawn	lost	for	against	difference	Try BP	Losing BP	Grand Slam BP	Table points
1	Malta	4	3	1	0	117	49	+68	2	0	0	16
2	Croatia	4	3	1	0	123	69	+54	2	0	0	16
3	Israel	4	2	0	2	104	62	+42	1	2	0	11
4	Cyprus	4	1	0	3	79	139	−60	0	0	0	4
5	Bosnia and Herzegovina	4	0	0	4	40	144	−104	0	1	0	1
Pre-Tournament rankings in parentheses. Points were awarded to the teams as follows: Win – 4 points : Draw – 2 points : Loss within 7 points – 1 point : Loss greater than 7 points – 0 points: At least 3 more tries than opponent- 1 point Completing a Grand Slam – 1 point

==== Fixtures ====
13 October 2018	Bosnia and Herzegovina	11–40	Croatia (1 TBP)	Stadion Kamberovića polje, Zenica
19:00 CEST (UTC+02)		Gamesheet		Attendance: 1,000; Referee: (Czech Republic) Matej Razga

20 October 2018	(1 TBP) Croatia	46–24	Cyprus	Stadion Stari plac, Split
16:00 CEST (UTC+02)		Gamesheet		Attendance: n.a. Referee: (Italy) Manuel Bottino

20 October 2018	(1 LBP) Israel	14–21	Malta	Wingate Institute, Netanya
14:00 IDT (UTC+03)		Gamesheet		Attendance: n.a. Referee: (Belgium) John Catteau

27 October 2018	(1 TBP) Malta	41–7	Bosnia and Herzegovina	Hibernians Stadium, Paola
14:00 CEST (UTC+02)		Gamesheet		Attendance: 1,500; Referee: (Monaco) Anthony Lac

27 October 2018	Croatia	19–16	Israel (1 LBP)	Stadion NŠC Stjepan Spajić, Zagreb
15:00 CEST (UTC+02)		Gamesheet		Attendance: n.a. Referee: (Wales) Ben Breakspear

10 November 2018	Cyprus	22–34	Israel	Stelios Kyriakides Stadium, Paphos
15:00 EET (UTC+02)		Gamesheet		Attendance: n.a. Referee: (Spain) Jorge Molpeceres

16 March 2019	(1 TBP) Israel	40–0	Bosnia and Herzegovina	Wingate Institute, Netanya
14:00 IST (UTC+02)		Gamesheet		Attendance: 500; Referee: (Switzerland) Ethan Glass

23 March 2019	Cyprus	10–37	Malta (1 TBP)	Stelios Kyriakides Stadium, Paphos
15:00 EET (UTC+02)		Gamesheet		Attendance: 700; Referee: Scotland Hollie Davidson

06 April 2019	(1 LBP) Bosnia and Herzegovina	22-23	Cyprus	Stadion Kamberovića polje, Zenica
14:00 CEST (UTC+02)		Gamesheet		Attendance: 250; Referee: (Russia) Georgii Kopp

13 April 2019	Malta	18-18	Croatia	Hibernians Stadium, Paola
14:00 CEST (UTC+02)		Gamesheet		Attendance: 1,800; Referee: (Spain) Jorge Molpeceres

== Conference 2 ==
=== North ===
==== Table ====
Champions and Promoted
Possible Relegation

Place	Nation	Games				Points			Try BP	Losing BP	Grand Slam BP	Table points
Place	Nation	played	won	drawn	lost	for	against	difference	Try BP	Losing BP	Grand Slam BP	Table points
1	Latvia	4	4	0	0	118	43	+75	3	0	1	20
2	Finland	4	3	0	1	95	93	+2	0	0	0	12
3	Denmark	4	2	0	2	100	77	+23	2	1	0	11
4	Norway	4	1	0	3	54	112	−58	0	0	0	4
5	Austria	4	0	0	4	62	104	−42	0	3	0	3
Pre-Tournament rankings in parentheses. Points were awarded to the teams as follows: Win – 4 points : Draw – 2 points : Loss within 7 points – 1 point : Loss greater than 7 points – 0 points: At least 3 more tries than opponent- 1 point Completing a Grand Slam – 1 point

==== Fixtures ====
13 October 2018	Finland	22-18	Denmark (1 LBP)	Myllypuron urheilupuisto, Helsinki
15:00 EEST (UTC+03)		Gamesheet		Attendance: 300; Referee: (Sweden) Jacob Bäverstam

13 October 2018	Norway	9-6	Austria (1 LBP)	Fana Stadion, Bergen
15:00 CEST (UTC+02)		Gamesheet		Attendance: 300; Referee: (Belgium) Nicolas Vandecauter

20 October 2018	(1 TBP) Latvia	24-7	Finland	Daugavas stadions, Riga
15:00 EEST (UTC+03)		Gamesheet		Attendance: 500; Referee: (Romania) Alexandru Ionescu

27 October 2018	(1 TBP) Denmark	42-10	Norway	Atletikstadion, Odense
17:00 CEST (UTC+02)		Gamesheet		Attendance: 1,000; Referee: (Poland) Lukasz Jasiński

27 October 2018	(1 LBP) Austria	20-26	Latvia	Wiener Sportclub-Platz, Wien
19:00 CEST (UTC+02)		Gamesheet		Attendance: 1,000; Referee: (Germany) Killian O'Brien

30 March 2019	(1 LBP) Austria	29-32	Finland	Wiener Sportclub-Platz, Wien
15:00 CET (UTC+01)		Gamesheet		Attendance: 500; Referee: (Serbia) STLIGIC Dejean

27 April 2019	(1 TBP) Denmark	37-7	Austria	Hjemmebane Rugbyklubben Speed, Kastrup
16:00 CEST (UTC+02)		Gamesheet		Attendance: 857; Referee: (Monaco) Anthony Lac

4 May 2019	(1 TBP) Latvia	38-3	Denmark	Baldone Stadium, Baldone
17:00 EEST (UTC+03)		Gamesheet		Attendance: 350; Referee: (Switzerland) Ethan Glass

25 May 2019	Norway	13-30	Latvia (1 TBP)	Kanalbanen, Horten Rugby Klubb, Horten
16:00 CEST (UTC+02)		Gamesheet		Attendance: n/a Referee: (Sweden) Rami Aro

1 June 2019	Finland	34-22	Norway	Myllypuron urheilupuisto, Helsinki
17:00 EEST (UTC+03)		Gamesheet		Attendance: 110; Referee: (Netherlands) Gert Visser

=== South ===
==== Table ====
Champions and Promoted
Relegated

Place	Nation	Games				Points			Try BP	Losing BP	Grand Slam BP	Table points
Place	Nation	played	won	drawn	lost	for	against	difference	Try BP	Losing BP	Grand Slam BP	Table points
1	Slovenia (77)	4	3	0	1	191	67	+124	2	0	0	14
2	Bulgaria (94)	4	3	0	1	125	98	+27	0	0	0	12
3	Serbia (82)	4	2	0	2	101	105	-4	1	1	0	10
4	Andorra (70)	4	2	0	2	94	103	-9	1	0	0	9
5	Slovakia (NR)	4	0	0	4	53	191	-138	0	0	0	0
Pre-Tournament rankings in parentheses. Points were awarded to the teams as follows: Win – 4 points : Draw – 2 points : Loss within 7 points – 1 point : Loss greater than 7 points – 0 points: At least 3 more tries than opponent- 1 point Completing a Grand Slam – 1 point

==== Fixtures ====
13 October 2018	(1 LBP) Serbia	29-35	Bulgaria	Stadion Kralj Petar Prvi, Beograd
15:00 CEST (UTC+02)		Gamesheet		Attendance: n.a. Referee: (Czech Republic) Stepan Cekal

20 October 2018	(1 TBP) Slovenia	48-14	Andorra	Rugby stadion OVAL, Ljubljana
14:00 CEST (UTC+02)		Gamesheet		Attendance: 400; Referee: (Croatia) Hrvoje Bartolić

27 October 2018	Bulgaria	13-25	Slovenia	NSA Vassil Levski, Sofia
16:00 CEST (UTC+02)		Gamesheet		Attendance: 600; Referee: (Serbia) Dejan Stiglic

03 November 2018	Andorra	27-14	Slovakia	Estadi Nacional, Andorra la Vella
17:00 CET (UTC+01)		Gamesheet		Attendance: 400; Referee: (Israel) Ariel Cabral

10 November 2018	Slovakia	10-37	Serbia (1 TBP)	Štadión PFK, Piešťany
14:00 CET (UTC+01)		Gamesheet		Attendance: 200; Referee: (Denmark) Mike Hawkins

20 April 2019	Slovakia	24-36	Bulgaria	Štadión PFK, Piešťany
17:00 CEST (UTC+02)		Gamesheet		Attendance: 200; Referee: (Russia) Alexei Lebedev

11 May 2019	Serbia	35-27	Slovenia	Stadion Borca, Starčevo
14:00 CEST (UTC+02)		Gamesheet		Attendance: 400; Referee: (Israel) Ariel Cabral

11 May 2019	Bulgaria	41-20	Andorra	NSA Vassil Levski, Sofia
17:00 EEST (UTC+03)		Gamesheet		Attendance: 800; Referee: (Denmark) Mike Hawkins

18 May 2019	(1 TBP) Slovenia	91-5	Slovakia	Rugby stadion OVAL, Ljubljana
15:00 CEST (UTC+02)		Gamesheet		Attendance: 300; Referee: (Czech Republic) Matej Razga

18 May 2019	(1 TBP) Andorra	33-0	Serbia	Estadi Nacional, Andorra la Vella
18:00 CEST (UTC+02)		Gamesheet		Attendance: 600; Referee: (Portugal) Jao Costa

== See also ==
- Rugby Europe International Championships
- 2018–19 Rugby Europe International Championships
- Six Nations Championship
