= 2006–2008 European Nations Cup Third Division =

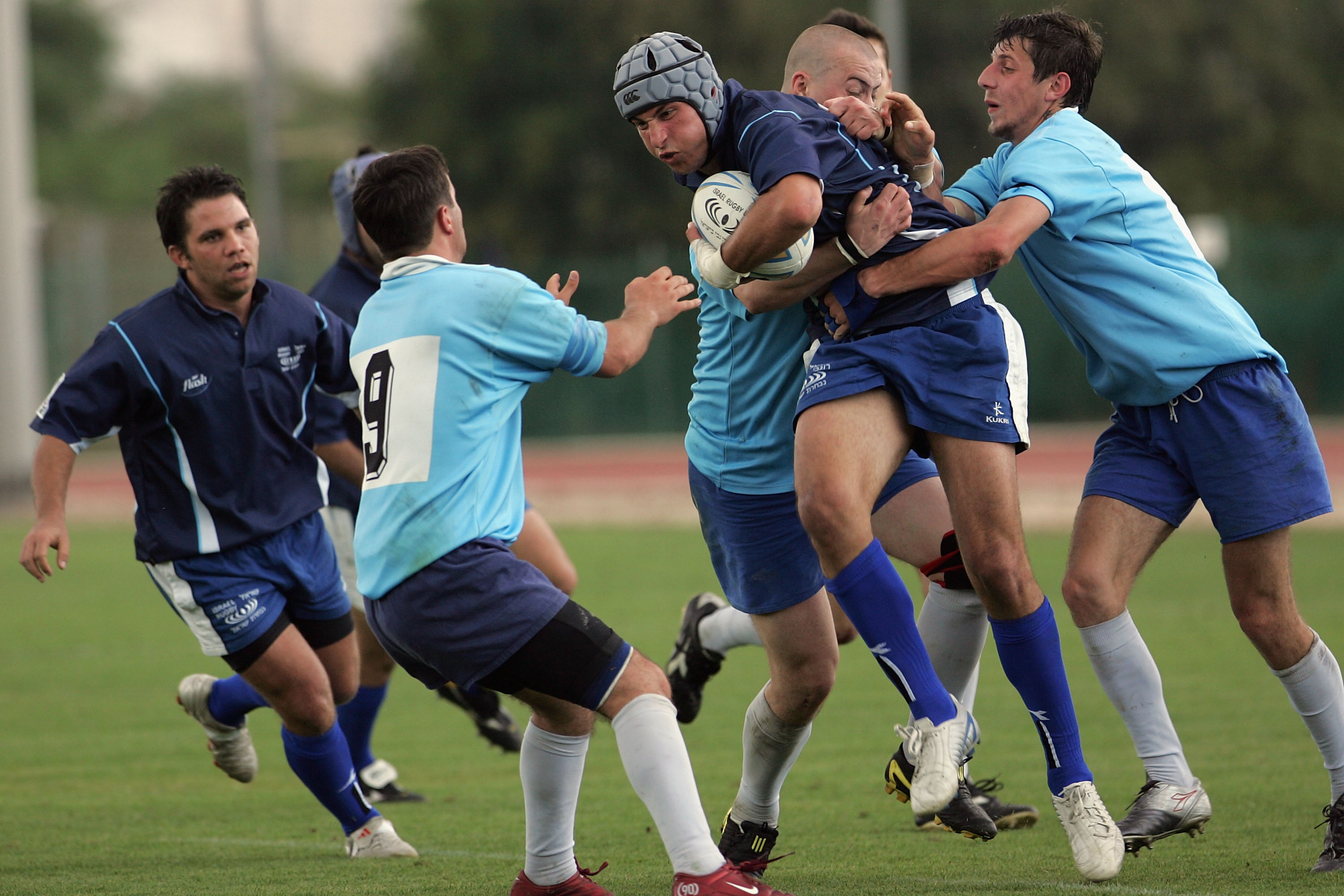
Israel playing Bosnia and Herzegovina for the European Nations Cup Third Division

The 2006–2008 European Nations Cup (ENC) Third Division (a European rugby union competition for national teams) will be contested over two years during which all teams meet each other home and away. The Third Division consists of four levels, which effectively constitute the 5th through 8th levels of European international rugby. The winner of each division shall be promoted to the next highest division, and the loser relegated to the next division lower.

The previous champion of Division 3A, Latvia was promoted to the Second Division and replaced with Serbia and Montenegro (now Serbia), which came last in Round 3 of the qualification for the World Cup 2007.

== Division 3A ==
Pos	Team	Games				Points			Table Points
Pos	Team	Play	Won	Draw	Lost	For	Ag.	Diff.	Table Points
1	Sweden	8	7	0	1	153	66	+87	22
2	Armenia	8	5	0	3	128	115	+13	18
3	Switzerland	8	4	0	4	150	129	+24	16
4	Serbia	8	2	1	5	99	168	−69	13
5	Denmark	8	1	1	6	112	165	−55	11

- Matches:

Date	Match	Result	Venue
30-Sep-2006	Armenia – Switzerland	16–29	Vienne (France)
7-Oct-2006	Switzerland – Serbia	30–9	Nyon (Switzerland)
21-Oct-2006	Sweden – Armenia	24–0	Helsingborg (Sweden)
28-Oct-2006	Denmark – Sweden	13–23	Odense (Denmark)
4-Nov-2006	Serbia – Denmark	34–23	Belgrade (Serbia)
31-Mar-2007	Switzerland – Denmark	22–24	Basel (Switzerland)
7-Apr-2007	Denmark – Armenia	3–11	Odense (Denmark)
14-Apr-2007	Serbia – Sweden	12–30	Belgrade (Serbia)
5-May-2007	Sweden – Switzerland	6–0	Eskilstuna (Sweden)
1-Sep-2007	Armenia – Sweden	16–12	Bourgoin-Jallieu (France)
6-Oct-2007	Switzerland – Armenia	15–28	Nyon (Switzerland)
27-Oct-2007	Denmark – Serbia	17–17	Odense (Denmark)
3-Nov-2007	Sweden – Denmark	8–6	Helsingborg (Sweden)
24-Nov-2007	Serbia – Switzerland	5–13	Belgrade (Serbia)
5-Apr-2008	Denmark – Switzerland	13–28	Odense (Denmark)
12-Apr-2008	Armenia – Denmark	24–13	Yerevan (Armenia)
19-Apr-2008	Switzerland – Sweden	16–28	Nyon (Switzerland)
26-Apr-2008	Sweden – Serbia	22–3	Stockholm (Sweden)
10-May-2008	Armenia – Serbia	25–0	Yerevan (Armenia)
24-May-2008	Serbia – Armenia	19–8	Belgrade (Serbia)

== Division 3B ==
Pos	Team	Games				Points			Table Points
Pos	Team	Play	Won	Draw	Lost	For	Ag.	Diff.	Table Points
1	Lithuania	8	8	0	0	315	56	+259	24
2	Hungary	8	5	0	3	144	83	+61	18
3	Norway	8	2	1	5	114	152	−38	13
4	Austria	8	2	1	5	32	152	−120	13
5	Bulgaria	8	2	0	6	87	249	−162	12

- Matches:

Date	Match	Result	Venue
7-Oct-2006	Norway – Hungary	8–13	Stavanger (Norway)
28-Oct-2006	Hungary – Bulgaria	42–3	Kecskemét (Hungary)
28-Oct-2006	Lithuania – Norway	37–15	Vilnius (Lithuania)
18-Nov-2006	Bulgaria – Lithuania	10–50	Etropole (Bulgaria)
21-Apr-2007	Hungary – Austria	27–5	Dunaújváros (Hungary)
5-May-2007	Austria – Bulgaria	7–3	Vienna (Austria)
19-May-2007	Austria – Lithuania	0–27	Vienna (Austria)
19-May-2007	Bulgaria – Norway	25–10	Sofia (Bulgaria)
2-Jun-2007	Lithuania – Hungary	36–7	Vilnius (Lithuania)
9-Jun-2007	Norway – Austria	22–8	Fosen (Norway)
27-Oct-2007	Lithuania – Bulgaria	64–3	Vilnius (Lithuania)
27-Oct-2007	Hungary – Norway	5–3	Székesfehérvár (Hungary)
17-Nov-2007	Bulgaria – Hungary	32–6	Etropole (Bulgaria)
26-Apr-2008	Austria – Norway	3–3	Vienna (Austria)
3-May-2008	Lithuania – Austria	48–0	Vilnius or Kaunas (Lithuania)
10-May-2008	Norway – Bulgaria	44–21	Stavanger (Norway)
17-May-2008	Hungary – Lithuania	12–13	Esztergom (Hungary)
24-May-2008	Bulgaria – Austria	16–0	Sofia (Bulgaria)
7-Jun-2008	Norway – Lithuania	9–40	Tønsberg (Norway)
8-Jun-2008	Austria – Hungary	9–6	Vienna (Austria)

== Division 3C ==
Pos	Team	Games				Points			Table Points
Pos	Team	Play	Won	Draw	Lost	For	Ag.	Diff.	Table Points
1	Slovenia	8	7	0	1	227	65	+162	22
2	Luxembourg	8	4	0	4	126	105	+21	16
3	Finland	8	3	1	4	84	131	−47	15
4	Israel	8	3	0	5	141	158	−17	14
5	Bosnia-Herz.	8	2	1	5	92	211	−119	13

Bosnia was relegated to division 3D, while Israel will undertook a relegation/promotion playoff with Cyprus.

- Matches:

Date	Match	Result	Venue
30-Sep-2006	Luxembourg – Finland	16–8	Cessange (Luxembourg)
7-Oct-2006	Bosnia – Finland	7–14	Zenica (Bosnia and Herzegovina)
28-Oct-2006	Israel – Slovenia	5–28	Netanya (Israel)
21-Apr-2007	Bosnia – Luxembourg	12–17	Zenica (Bosnia and Herzegovina)
28-Apr-2007	Israel – Bosnia	34–13	Netanya (Israel)
5-May-2007	Slovenia – Luxembourg	25–16	Ljubljana (Slovenia)
19-May-2007	Slovenia – Bosnia	77–5	Ljubljana (Slovenia)
20-May-2007	Luxembourg – Israel	22–16	Luxembourg City (Luxembourg)
26-May-2007	Finland – Slovenia	6–21	Helsinki (Finland)
2-Jun-2007	Finland – Israel	27–20	Jyväskylä (Finland)
27-Oct-2007	Luxembourg – Bosnia	30–3	Luxembourg City (Luxembourg)
27-Oct-2007	Slovenia – Finland	32–3	Ljubljana (Slovenia)
19-Apr-2008	Luxembourg – Slovenia	3–10	Luxembourg City (Luxembourg)
20-Apr-2008	Bosnia – Israel	27–19	Zenica (Bosnia and Herzegovina)
26-Apr-2008	Slovenia – Israel	17–5	Ljubljana (Slovenia)
3-May-2008	Israel – Luxembourg	20–12	Netanya (Israel)
10-May-2008	Bosnia – Slovenia	22–17	Zenica (Bosnia and Herzegovina)
17-May-2008	Finland – Bosnia	3–3	Helsinki (Finland)
24-May-2008	Finland – Luxembourg	11–10	Helsinki (Finland)
31-May-2008	Israel – Finland	22–12	Netanya (Israel)

== Division 3D (2006–07) ==
=== Semifinals ===
Date	Match	Result	Venue
7-Oct-2006	Azerbaijan – Greece	5–20	Baku (Azerbaijan)
4-Nov-2006	Greece – Azerbaijan	45–10	Athens (Greece)

Date	Match	Result	Venue
14-Oct-2006	Slovakia – Monaco	0–6	Bratislava (Slovakia)

- Monaco was disqualified for irregular use of French players.

=== Final ===
Date	Match	Result	Venue
12-May-2007	Greece – Slovakia	20–17	Thessaloniki (Greece)

- Greece promoted to 2008–10 Div. 3/C

== Division 3D (2007–08) ==
Pos	Team	Games				Points			Table Points
Pos	Team	Play	Won	Draw	Lost	For	Ag.	Diff.	Table Points
1	Cyprus	3	3	0	0	86	21	+65	9
2	Monaco	2	1	0	1	51	22	+29	4
3	Slovakia	2	1	0	1	71	26	−15	4
4	Azerbaijan	3	0	0	3	24	103	−79	3

- Matches:

2007-10-28

Slovakia	33–18	Azerbaijan

Makario Stadium, Nicosia

2007-10-29

Cyprus	29–0	Azerbaijan
Try: Tony Crassas, Andrew Binikos, Colm O'Cleirigh, Phillipos Kyriakou; Con: Tony Crassas (3); Pen: Tony Crassas

Pafiako Stadium, Paphos

2007-10-31

Cyprus	19–10	Monaco
Try: George Agathocleous; Con: Tony Thoma; Pen: Tony Thoma (3)		Try: Davide Pozzati; Con: Davide Pozzati; Drop: Davide Pozzati

Makario Stadium, Nicosia

2007-11-03

Cyprus	38–8	Slovakia
Try: George Agathocleous (2), Panayiotis Ioulianou, Andrew Binikos (2), Tony Crassas; Con: Tony Crassas (4)		Try: Nosko Roman; Pen: Cmiel Martin

Kiniras Sport Centre, Geriskipou

2007-11-03

Monaco	41–3	Azerbaijan

Kiniras Sport Centre, Geriskipou

== 3C/3D Promotion/relegation play-off ==
Date	Match	Result	Venue
6-Sep-2008	Israel – Cyprus	23–14	Netanya (Israel)

== See also ==
- 2006-2008 European Nations Cup First Division
- 2006-2008 European Nations Cup Second Division
