= 2014–2016 European Nations Cup Second Division =

2014–16 European Nations Cup
- Date: 2014–2016
- Countries: Division 2A: Croatia; Czech Republic; Israel; Malta; Switzerland; Division 2B: Andorra; Cyprus; Hungary; Latvia; Lithuania; Division 2C: Austria; Denmark; Luxembourg; Serbia; Slovenia; Division 2D: Bosnia and Herzegovina; Bulgaria; Finland; Norway; Turkey

Tournament statistics
- Matches played: Division 2A: 5 Division 2B: 5 Division 2C: 5 Division 2D: 5
- Top point scorers: Division 2A: (Czech Republic) Marek Loutocký (25 points) Division 2B: (Cyprus) Alexander Zavallis (25 points) Division 2C: (Slovenia) Žiga Burnik (29 points) Division 2D: (Bosnia and Herzegovina) Armin Vehabović (58 points)
- Top try scorers: Division 2A: (Czech Republic) Marek Loutocký (5 tries) Division 2B: (Lithuania) Vytaras Bloskys & (Andorra) Joan Fité (3 tries) Division 2C: 1 try – 21 players Division 2D: (Bosnia and Herzegovina) Armin Vehabović & (Finland) Thomas Finell (3 tries)
- Official website: Rugby Europe

The 2014–16 European Nations Cup Second Division is the third tier rugby union in Europe behind the Six Nations Championship and the 2014–16 European Nations Cup First Division.

The second division comprises four pools (2A, 2B, 2C, and 2D). Teams within each division play each other in a home and away round robin schedule over a two-year period.

At the end of every season a champion is declared, but for relegation and promotion only the two years ranking are considered.

Starting in the 2016–2017 season, standings over one-year cycles will be used for promotion and relegation, instead of two-year cycles

With the adoption of the new format for 2016–17 Rugby Europe International Championships, the relegation/promotion format was changed, at the end of tournament.

While the first of pool A will be always promoted to First Division 1 Pool B, now renamed 2016–17 Rugby Europe Trophy, for other ranked teams all change in this way

- A New 2016–17 Rugby Europe Conference 1 will be formed with the team originally destined to 2016–17 Pool A and Pool B, but will be divided in two pool according to the geographical basis.
- A New 2016–17 Rugby Europe Conference 2 will be formed with the team originally destined to 2016–17 Pool C and Pool D, but will be divided in two pool according to the geographical basis.

(Originally The first in the 2014–2016 ranking of each pool will be promoted while last place teams will be relegated. Winners of pool 2A, will be promoted to division 1 pool B for the 2016–17 edition while the last place team in pool 2A will be relegated to pool 2B. Likewise, winners of 2B will be promoted to 2A, last place in 2B will be relegated to 2C, winner of 2C will be promoted to 2B, last place of 2C will be relegated to 2D, winner of 2D will be promoted to 2C and last place of 2D will be relegated to 3; The winner of 3 replacing the relegated 2D team.)

== Division 2A ==
=== 2014–2015 ===
Table

2014–15 Champions

Place	Nation	Games				Points			Bonus points	Table points
Place	Nation	played	won	drawn	lost	for	against	difference	Bonus points	Table points
1	Czech Republic (39)	4	3	1	0	92	62	+30	3	17
2	Switzerland (45)	4	3	0	1	106	85	+21	2	14
3	Malta (41)	4	2	0	2	80	89	−9	1	9
4	Croatia (49)	4	1	0	3	86	103	−17	4	8
5	Israel (51)	4	0	1	3	77	102	−25	1	3

Pre-tournament IRB rankings in parentheses (as at 20 October 2014)

Games

25 October 2014	Israel	18–29	Switzerland	Wingate Institute, Netanya, Israel
	Try: Guy Matisis (54'), Jonathan Radashkovich (79'c); Con: Ronen Tollman; Pen: Ori Abutbul 2 (24', 36'); Cards: Nathan Amos (yellow card) 39' to 49', Adrian Rainstein (yellow card) 56' to 66', Ushangi Manjavidze (yellow card) 75' to 80'	Team Sheet	Try: Julien Gros (3'), Cyril Lin (27'c), Lucas Heinrich (65'c), Penalty Try (78'c); Con: Simon Perrod 3 Pen: Simon Perrod (36'); Cards: Ludovic Pommies (yellow card) 75' to 80'	Attendance: 1,200; Referee: (Belgium) Nicolas Vandecauter

1 November 2014	Switzerland	14–27	Czech Republic	Stade de Colovray, Nyon, Switzerland
	Try: Mathias Bernath-Yendt (5'c), Thibault Gery (22'c); Con: Simon Perrod 2 Cards: Ludovic Pommies (yellow card) 58' to 68'	Team Sheet	Try: Robert Voves (33'c), Marek Loutocký 3 (50'c, 59', 68'); Con: Pavel Vokrouhlík 2 Pen: Pavel Vokrouhlík (26')	Attendance: 1,018; Referee: (Spain) Jorge Molpeceres

1 November 2014	Malta	31–26	Croatia	Hibernians Ground, Paola, Malta
	Try: Vincent Stivala 2 (35'c, 64'), Toby Quarendon (43'c); Con: James O'Brien 2 Pen: James O'Brien 4 (4', 8', 10', 31'); Cards: James Morris (yellow card) 23' to 33'	Team Sheet	Try: Jay Ayoub (18'c), Luka Perlain (25'), Nik Jurišić (60'c), Tonći Buzov (75'c); Con: Jay Ayoub 3	Attendance: 2,500; Referee: (France) Tual Trainini

8 November 2014	Czech Republic	27–13	Malta	Stadion ragby Císařka, Prague, Czech Republic
	Try: Ales Stejskal (32'), Marek Loutocký 2 (37'c, 60'c), Martin Sadilek (42'); Con: Petr Čížek, Pavel Vokrouhlík; Pen: Petr Čížek (23'); Cards: Martin Wognitsch (yellow card) 40' to 50'	Team Sheet	Try: James O'Brien (72'), Robert Holloway (75'); Pen: James O'Brien (45'); Cards: Christian Shranz (yellow card) 31' to 41'	Attendance: 950; Referee: (Portugal) Paolo Duarte

8 November 2014	Croatia	31–20	Israel	Stadion Stari Plac, Split, Croatia
	Try: Dušan Hakaraia (14'), Marko Buljac (28'), Jason Newton (40'), Tomislav Burazin (74'), Stipe Tomić (80'); Pen: Jay Ayoub 2 (4', 33'); Cards: Jason Newton (yellow card) 78' to 80'	Team Sheet	Try: Matan Brosh (8'c), Yonatan Kaplan (23'c); Con: Ori Abutbul 2 Pen: Ori Abutbul 2 (73', 78')	Attendance: 1,000; Referee: (Netherlands) Gert Wisser

11 April 2015	Croatia	9–12	Czech Republic	Stadion Lučko, Zagreb, Croatia
	Pen: Jay Ayoub 3 (10', 20', 40'); Cards: Ivan Miljak (yellow card) 47' to 57'	Team Sheet	Try: Vakhtang Pailodze (8'), Jiri Frank (49'c); Con: Tomas Forst	Attendance: 500; Referee: (Spain) Igotz Gallastegui

18 April 2015	Israel	13–16	Malta	Wingate Institute, Netanya, Israel
	Try: Ori Abutbul (40'+2'), Michael Eli (80'+2'); Pen: Ori Abutbul (62'); Cards: Fabian Maguid (yellow card) 73' to 80'	Team Sheet	Try: Harry Collins (54'), James Kirk (77'); Pen: James O'Brien 2 (24', 42')	Attendance: 350; Referee: (Italy) Claudio Blessano

18 April 2015	Switzerland	40–20	Croatia	Monthey, Switzerland
	Try: Brice Monzeglio 2 (2'c, 51'c), Ghislain Monteil (11'c), Mathieu Guyou (68'c); Con: Simon Perrod 4 Pen: Simon Perrod 3 (39', 46', 59'); Drop: Sebastian Hirsch (53'); Cards: Nicolas Guyou (yellow card) 21' to 31'	Team Sheet	Try: Jay Ayoub (8'c), Tomislav Burazin (55'c); Con: Jay Ayoub 2 Pen: Jay Ayoub (5', 44'); Cards: Tvrtko Dumancic (yellow card) 58' to 68'	Attendance: 2,000; Referee: (Germany) Frank Himmer

25 April 2015	Malta	20–23	Switzerland	Hibernians Ground, Paola, Malta
	Try: Rhodri Apsee, Dominic Busuttil; Con: James O'Brien 2 Pen: James O'Brien, James Morris	WR Team Sheet; Match Report – Times of Malta	Try: Thibault Gery, Brice Monzeglio, Ghislain Montiel; Con: Sebastian Dimitri; Pen: Sebastian Dimitri; Drop: Sebastian Dimitri	Referee: (Germany) Gert Visser

25 April 2015	Czech Republic	26–26	Israel	RC Sparta Prague, Prague, Czech Republic
	Try: Aleš Stejska (16'c), Jiří Lacina 2 (53'c, 74'c), Jan Olbrich (79'); Con: Pavel Vokrouhlík, Petr Čížek 2	WR Team Sheet	Try: Jonathan Radashkovich (22'c), Ori Abutbul (26'c); Con: Ori Abutbul 2 Pen: Ori Abutbul 3 (14', 53', 58'); Drop: Vitali Pryimak (77')	Attendance: 1,200; Referee: (Russia) Alexei Bryzgalin

=== 2015–16 ===
Table

2015–16 Champions

Place	Nation	Games				Points			Bonus points	Table points
Place	Nation	played	won	drawn	lost	for	against	difference	Bonus points	Table points
1	Switzerland	4	4	0	0	117	35	+82	3	19
2	Czech Republic	4	3	0	1	100	57	+43	3	15
3	Croatia	4	2	0	2	80	114	−34	1	9
4	Malta	4	1	0	3	73	92	−19	3	7
5	Israel	4	0	0	4	50	124	−74	1	1

Games

24 October 2015	Czech Republic	14–20	Switzerland	JIMI RC Vyškov, Vyškov, Czech Republic
14:00 CEST (UTC+2)	Try: Loutocky 58'c Wognitsch 70'c Con: Cizek (2/2) 59', 70'; Cards: Pantucek (yellow card) 34' to 44'		Try: Hirsch 21'c Heinrich 65'c Con: Perrod (2/2) 22', 66'; Pen: Perrod 11', 48'; Cards: Montiel (yellow card) 19' to 29'	Attendance: 500; Referee: (Belgium) M. Burlet

7 November 2015	Israel	21–26	Croatia	Wingate Institute, Netanya, Israel
	Try: Amos 37'c Humphreys 61'; Con: Abutbul 38'; Pen: Abutbul 3', 28', 54'		Try: Vinac 59'c Newton 79'c Con: Newton 60', 79'; Pen: Newton 5', 16', 34', 51'	Attendance: 1150; Referee: (France) L. Corona

14 November 2015	Croatia	34–27	Malta	Split, Croatia
14:00 CET (UTC+1)	Try: Jurisic 17'c Suta 35'c Newton 56'; Con: Newton 17', 35'; Pen: Newton 7', 29', 40+1', 67', 73'; Cards: Grcic (yellow card) 78' to 80'		Try: Borg 26'; Watts 63'c Con: Quarendon 63'; Pen: Quarendon 21', 39', 69',77'	Referee: (Germany) F. Himmer

14 November 2015	Switzerland	28–3	Israel	Geneva, Switzerland
16:00 CET (UTC+1)	Try: Doy 6'c Lin 27'c S. Hirsch 41'c Gangath-Samba 73'c Con: G. Hirsch 7'c, 28'c, 42'c, 74'c		Pen: Abutbul 37'; Cards: Lotan (yellow card) 63' to 73'	Referee: (Portugal) P. Mendes Silva

21 November 2015	Malta	13–20	Czech Republic	Hibernians Stadium, Kordin, Malta
14:00 CET (UTC+1)	Try: Luke Watts 38'c Con: Toby Quarendon 39'; Pen: Toby Quarendon 52', 64'; Cards: Mark Davey (yellow card) 28' to 38'		Try: Ales Stejskal 19'; Marek Loutocký 29'; Martin Wognitsch 80'c Con: Petr Cizek 80'; Pen: Petr Cizek 49'; Cards: Jiri Pentucek (yellow card) 32' to 42'; Robert Voves (yellow card) 42' to 52'	Attendance: 2000; Referee: (France) S. Boyer

2 April 2016	Israel	19–40	Czech Republic	Netanya, Israel
15:00 IDT (UTC+3)				Referee: (Italy) E. Rizzo

9 April 2016	Switzerland	29–3	Malta	Stadion Utogrund, Zürich, Switzerland
16:00	Try: Cyril Lin 7'c Florian Escoffier 14'; Brice Monzeglio 62'c Lucas Heinrich 69'c Con: Simon Perrod 8', 63', 70'; Pen: Simon Perrod 2'		Pen: James Morris 42'; Cards: Darren Deguara (yellow card) 62' to 72'	Attendance: 2500; Referee: (France) Cyril Lafon

9 April 2016	Czech Republic	26–5	Croatia	Havířov, Czech Republic
14:00 CEST (UTC+2)				Referee: (Spain) J. Molpeceres

16 April 2016	Malta	30–9	Israel	Hibernians Stadium, Kordin, Malta
14:00 CEST (UTC+2)	Try: Rory O'Brien 5'c Darren Deguara 36'c Anthony Harvey 42'; Mark Davey 84'; Con: James Morris 6', 37'; Pen: James Morris 2', 21'		Pen: Ori Abutbul 8', 35', 40'; Cards: Ori Abutbul (yellow card) 44' to 54'; Matan Brosh (yellow card) 61' to 71'	Attendance: 2,500; Referee: (Wales) C. Evans

16 April 2016	Croatia	15–40	Switzerland	Zagreb, Croatia
15:00 CEST (UTC+2)	Try: Luciano Rosso 22'; Toni Grle 36'; Dylan Rowe 55'		Try: Cyril Lafuye 6'c, 12'c Lucas Heinrich 15'c Jonathan Wullschleger 39'c Con: Simon Perrod 6', 12', 15', 39'; Pen: Simon Perrod 45', 67', 78', 80'	Attendance: 1100; Referee: (Spain) I. Gallastegui

=== 2014–2016 ===
Combined table

Promoted to 2016–17 Rugby Europe Trophy
To 2016–17 Rugby Europe Conference 1

Place	Nation	Games				Points			Bonus points	Table points
Place	Nation	played	won	drawn	lost	for	against	difference	Bonus points	Table points
1	Switzerland (45)	8	7	0	1	223	120	+103	5	33
2	Czech Republic (39)	8	6	1	1	192	119	+73	6	32
3	Croatia (49)	8	3	0	5	166	217	−51	5	17
4	Malta (41)	8	3	0	5	153	181	−28	4	16
5	Israel (51)	8	0	1	7	129	226	−97	2	4

Pre-tournament IRB rankings in parentheses (as at 20 October 2014)

== Division 2B ==
=== 2014–2015 ===
Table

2014–15 Champions

Place	Nation	Games				Points			Bonus points	Table points
Place	Nation	played	won	drawn	lost	for	against	difference	Bonus points	Table points
1	Lithuania (50)	4	4	0	0	144	75	+69	4	20
2	Cyprus (NR)	4	2	0	2	87	90	−3	1	9
3	Latvia (64)	4	2	0	2	71	94	−23	1	9
4	Andorra (63)	4	2	0	2	62	87	−25	1	9
5	Hungary (68)	4	0	0	4	76	94	−18	4	4

Pre-tournament IRB rankings in parentheses (as at 13 October 2014). Cyprus are not a full member of the IRB, and therefore have no rating (NR).
Games

18 October 2014	Andorra	15–34	Lithuania	Estadi Nacional, Andorra la Vella, Andorra
	Try: Joan Fité 2 (29', 67'c); Con: Marc Abello; Pen: Marc Abello (11'); Cards: Benjamin Fajol (yellow card) 32' to 42', Joan Fité (yellow card) 43' to 53'	Team Sheet	Try: Justinas Vasiliauskas (19'), Vytaras Bloskys 3 (36'c, 39', 71'c), Tomas Zibolas (43'c); Con: Dovydas Taujanskas 3 Pen: Dovydas Taujanskas (32'); Cards: Justinas Urbonas (yellow card) 13' to 23', Zygimantas Radzius (yellow card) 50' to 60'	Attendance: 500; Referee: (Portugal) Afonso Nogueira

25 October 2014	Lithuania	38–29	Hungary	Šiauliai, Lithuania
	Try: Justinas Vasiliauskas 2 (6',9'), Domantas Tautkus (29'c), Tomas Zibolis (36'), Kestutis Marcisauskas (43'c); Con: Kestutis Marcisauskas 2 Pen: Kestutis Marcisauskas 3 (13', 60', 73'); Cards: Ignas Jankaitis (yellow card) 77' to 80'	Team Sheet	Try: Juan Carlos Berbesi (22'c), David Darquier (58'c), Dániel Pluhár (78'), Attila Jámbor (80'c); Con: György Kömüves 3 Pen: György Kömüves (63')	Attendance: 800; Referee: (Russia) Vadim Pikhovkin

1 November 2014	Cyprus	30–10	Andorra	Paphos, Cyprus
	Try: Alexander Zavallis (40'c), Joakim Antoniou (48'c), Stevie Awah (80'+1'c); Con: Alexander Zavallis 3 Pen: Alexander Zavallis 3 (41', 48', 64'); Cards: Georgios Agathokleous (yellow card) 26' to 36'	Team Sheet	Try: Joan Fite (26'); Con: Marc Abello; Pen: Marc Abello (15')	Attendance: 600; Referee: (Israel) Ariel Cabral

2 November 2014	Hungary	14–16	Latvia	RCH Stadion, Esztergom, Hungary
	Try: Jonatán Katona (25'); Pen: Gregoire Collet 3 (11', 18', 65'); Cards: Roland Nagy (yellow card) 56' to 66'	Team Sheet	Try: Uldis Saulite (40'c); Con: Vadims Martinenko; Pen: Ruslans Kotlevs 2 (4', 43'), Vadims Martinenko (78')	Referee: (Croatia) Hrvoje Bartolic

15 November 2014	Latvia	39–20	Cyprus	Daugava Stadium, Riga, Latvia
	Try: Janis Skuja (19'c), Guntis Cirsa (33'), Matiss Zalcmanis (58'c), Leno Bramanis (64'c), Uldis Saulite (72'c); Con: Ruslans Kotlevs, Vadims Martinenko 3 Pen: Ruslans Kotlevs (4'), Vadims Martinenko (45')	Team Sheet	Try: Marcus Holden 2 (28'c, 62'), Yiannis Loizias (80'); Con: Alexander Zavallis; Pen: Alexander Zavallis (12')	Referee: (Russia) Georgij Kopp

Note: The loss by Cyprus ended their world record winning streak of 24 consecutive wins, extending back to November 2008.

29 March 2015	Hungary	15–17	Cyprus	Városi Szabadidő Központ, Szazhalombatta, Hungary
	Pen: Gregoire Collet 5 (1', 27', 39', 59', 71'); Cards: Thomas Ducrocq (yellow card) 13' to 23', Bence Róth (yellow card) 34' to 44'	Team Sheet	Try: Burham Torgut 2 (27', 48'c), Matthew King (80'+7'); Con: Alexander Zavallis-Roebuck	Attendance: 300; Referee: (Czech Republic) Štěpán Čekal

4 April 2015	Andorra	23–18	Hungary	Estadi Nacional, Andorra la Vella, Andorra
	Try: Galaktion Gagnidze (12'), Roger Fite (41'), Giorgi Rekhviashvili (60'), Joan Fite (80'); Pen: Marc Gispert (28'); Cards: Matthew Dawson (yellow card) 55' to 65'	Team Sheet	Pen: Gregoire Collet 3 (7',31',66'), Jonathan Katona 3 (21', 38', 70'); Cards: Attila Czakó (yellow card) 39' to 49'	Attendance: 300; Referee: (Portugal) Pedro Fonseca

25 April 2015	Lithuania	46–11	Latvia	Vingis Park Rugby Stadium, Vilnius, Lithuania
		WR Team Sheet		Referee: (Russia) Vladimir Volovik

2 May 2015	Latvia	5–14	Andorra	Daugava Stadium, Riga, Latvia
	Try: Emils Balodis (27'); Cards: Martinš Berzinš (yellow card) 11' to 21', Artūrs Kisle (yellow card) 74' to 80'	Team Sheets	Try: Daniel Raya (19'); Pen: Julien Ginesta 2 (11', 36'), Paul Alieu (80'); Cards: Joan Fite (yellow card) 71' to 80'	Attendance: 200; Referee: (Ukraine) Sergei Poplavskij

2 May 2015	Cyprus	20–26	Lithuania	Paphos, Cyprus
	Try: Mathrew King (47'), Fidias Efthymiou (62'), Michael Asprou (65'c); Con: Mathrew King; Pen: Mathrew King (33')	Team Sheet	Try: Zygimantas Radzius (20'c), Mantautas Vilimavicius (25'c), Tomas Zibolas 2 (39'c, 42'); Con: Dovydas Taujanskas 3	Attendance: 700; Referee: (Croatia) Marijo Jelovic

=== 2015–16 ===
Table

2015–16 Champions

Place	Nation	Games				Points			Bonus points	Table points
Place	Nation	played	won	drawn	lost	for	against	difference	Bonus points	Table points
1	Latvia	4	4	0	0	141	30	+111	4	20
2	Lithuania	4	3	0	1	140	84	+56	3	15
3	Andorra	4	2	0	2	77	106	−29	0	8
4	Cyprus	4	1	0	3	46	103	−57	0	4
5	Hungary	4	0	0	4	38	119	−81	0	0

Games

24 October 2015	Hungary	15–37	Lithuania	Esztergom, Hungary
15:00 CEST (UTC+2)	Try: Darquier 30'c Collet 51'; Con: Collet 31'; Pen: Collet 39'		Try: Kalinauskas 18'; Andrijauskas 20'; Bloskys 24', 42'; Marcisauskas 54'c Tautkus 78'c Con: Vilimavicius 54', 78'; Pen: Vilimavicius 72'; Cards: Radzius (yellow card) 39' to 49'	Attendance: 600; Referee: (Czech Republic) Štěpán Čekal

31 October 2015	Lithuania	49–17	Andorra	Šiauliai, Lithuania
14:00 EET (UTC+2)	Try: Mikalcius 1', 37'c Kalinauskas 12'; Poskevicius 20'; Radzius 28'; Vilimavicius 35', 50'c Bloskys 41'; Zibolis 63'; Con: Vilimavicius 37', 50'; Cards: Radzius (yellow card) 8' to 18'; Duncikas (yellow card) 60' to 70'		Try: penalty try 16'c Fite 39'c Con: Ginesta 16', 39'; Pen: Ginesta 9'; Cards: Macedo (yellow card) 79' to 80'	Referee: (Belgium) N. Vandecauter

31 October 2015	Latvia	39–10	Hungary	Daugava Stadium, Riga, Latvia
15:00 EET (UTC+2)	Try: Valdavs 31', 68'; Jansons 53'c Bekmanis 77'c Con: Davidsons 54', 77'; Pen: Davidsons 11', 16', 36' 43' 51'; Cards: Valdavs (yellow card) 55' to 65'; Silvoniks (yellow card) 65' to 75'		Try: Pluhar 65'c Con: Nagyhegyesi 66'; Pen: Nagyhegyesi 5'; Cards: Czako (yellow card) 24' to 34'	Attendance: 300; Referee: (Croatia) H. Bartolic

7 November 2015	Cyprus	3–31	Latvia	Paphos, Cyprus
14:30 EET (UTC+2)	Pen: M. Holden 13'; Cards: P. Tsangari (yellow card) 24' to 34'		Try: V. Valdavs 31'c L. Bramanis 36'; M. Bokiss 54'; V. Rankis 73'; Con: R. Davidsons 31'; Pen: R. Davidsons 10', 16', 58'; Cards: E. Imbrass (yellow card) 46' to 56'	Attendance: 700; Referee: (Belgium) N. Vandecauter

28 November 2015	Andorra	22–13	Cyprus	Estadi Nacional, Andorra La Vella, Andorra
16:00 CET (UTC+1)	Try: Roger Fite 21'c Peter Ambor 33'c Marc Abello 50'; Con: Marc Abello 22', 33'; Pen: Marc Abello 38'; Cards: Marc Arasanz (yellow card) 17' to 27'; Joan Fite (yellow card) 40' to 50'		Try: Yianis Blond 69'c Con: Thomas Timotheou 69'; Pen: Burham Torgut 6', 40'; Cards: Burham Torgut (yellow card) 17' to 27' Demetris Christopher (yellow card) 49' to 59'; Alexandros Philiotis (yellow card) 53' to 63'	Attendance: 500; Referee: (Portugal) A. Nogueira

26 March 2016	Andorra	10–34	Latvia	Andorra La Vella, Andorra
16:00 CET (UTC+1)	Try: CANTURRI 62'; MACEDO 77'; Cards: Ginesta (yellow card) 64' to 74'		Try: BALODIS 9'c BRAMANIS 31'; GRIEĶIS 45'c RAŅĶIS 55'c, 70'; Con: DAVIDSONS 10', 46', 56'; Pen: DAVIDSONS 65'; Cards: BRAMANIS (yellow card) 36' to 46'	Referee: (Italy) E. Tomo

9 April 2016	Cyprus	15–3	Hungary	Paphos, Cyprus
14:30 EEST (UTC+3)	Try: Burham Tourgut 5'; Matthew King 44'c Con: Matthew King 44'; Pen: Matthew King 39'		Pen: Gregoire Collet 48'	Referee: (Italy) E. Tomo

16 April 2016	Latvia	37–7	Lithuania	Daugava Stadium, Riga, Latvia
15:00 EEST (UTC+3)	Try: Leno Bramanis 22'c Maris Streikišs 56'c, 79'c Davis Bajārs 66'c Con: Robert Davidsons 23', 57', 66', 79'; Pen: Robert Davidsons 9', 39', 69'; Cards: Reinis Pepa (yellow card) 74' to 80'		Try: Kasparas Krasauskas 53'c Con: Lukas Sinkunas54'	Attendance: 400; Referee: (Russia) A. Bryzgalin

23 April 2016	Lithuania	47–15	Cyprus	Vingio Parkas, Vilnius
	Try: Dainius Tamoliunas 20'c Vytaras Bloskys 38', 42', 61'; Kestutis Marcisauskas 58'c, 67'c Vaitkevichius Darius 74'; Con: Armandas Burba (3/7) 20', 58', 67'; Pen: Armandas Burba 2', 52'; Cards: Dainius Tamoliunas 28' to 38'; Gediminas Marcisauskas 31' to 41'		Try: Marko Mladevonic 40'; Stylianos Theoklitou-Panaglotou 78'c Con: Marcus Holden (1/2) 78'; Pen: Marcus Holden 6'	Attendance: 1000; Referee: (Russia) G. Kopp

14 May 2016	Hungary	10–28	Andorra	Esztergom
	Try: Timar Suiogan 5'c Con: Timar Suiogan (1/1) 6'; Pen: Timar Suiogan 12'; Cards: Attila Jambor 36' to 46'; Alexandru Banu 63' to 73'; Karoly Suiogan 76' to 80'		Try: Liam Jordan 1'c Daniel Raya 19'; Galaktion Gagnidze 72'c Con: Marc Abello (1/2) 2'; Julien Ginesta (1/1) 73'; Pen: Marc Abello 30', 37', 44'; Cards: David Forto 24' to 34'; Albert Canturri 76' to 80'	Attendance: 300; Referee: Tomáš Tůma (Czech Rep.)

=== 2014–2016 ===
To 2016–17 Rugby Europe Conference 1
To 2016–17 Rugby Europe Conference 2

Place	Nation	Games				Points			Bonus points	Table points
Place	Nation	played	won	drawn	lost	for	against	difference	Bonus points	Table points
1	Lithuania (50)	8	7	0	1	284	159	+125	7	35
2	Latvia (64)	8	6	0	2	212	124	+88	5	29
3	Andorra (63)	8	4	0	4	139	193	−54	1	17
4	Cyprus (NR)	8	3	0	5	133	193	−60	1	13
5	Hungary (68)	8	0	0	8	114	213	−99	4	4

Pre-tournament IRB rankings in parentheses (as at 13 October 2014). Cyprus are not a full member of the IRB, and therefore have no rating (NR).

== Division 2C ==
=== 2014–2015 ===
Table

2014–15 Champions

Place	Nation	Games				Points			Bonus points	Table points
Place	Nation	played	won	drawn	lost	for	against	difference	Bonus points	Table points
1	Luxembourg (85)	4	4	0	0	81	29	+52	1	17
2	Slovenia (84)	4	3	0	1	92	43	+49	2	14
3	Serbia (83)	4	2	0	2	50	109	−59	0	8
4	Austria (82)	4	1	0	3	61	84	−23	2	6
5	Denmark (72)	4	0	0	4	64	83	−19	3	3

Pre-tournament IRB rankings in parentheses (as at 6 October 2014).

Games

11 October 2014	Austria	29–27	Denmark	Hohe Warte Stadium, Vienna, Austria
	Try: David Barry (52'); Pen: Maximilian Navas 8 (5', 18', 23', 45', 48', 61', 70', 79')	Team Sheet	Try: Christian Mellgaard (25'), PW Bjerrum (42'), Tomas Mayn (58'); Pen: Sebastian Hurst 2 (9', 40'), Joshua Jensen (64', 76'); Cards: Rasmus Dufke (yellow card) 70' to 80'	Attendance: 400; Referee: (Malta) Lionel da Silva

18 October 2014	Slovenia	48–3	Serbia	Ljubljana, Slovenia
	Try: George Skofic (9'), Blaž Pilko (34'c), Frank Skofic (39'c), Lewis Podpadec (53'c), Žiga Burnik (64'c), Jack Skofic (67'), Archie Skofic (72'c); Con: Žiga Burnik 5 Pen: Žiga Burnik (25')	Team Sheet	Drop: Andrija Jankovic	Attendance: 800; Referee: (Lithuania) Ramunas Gumbrinas

25 October 2014	Serbia	0–36	Luxembourg	Stadion Kralj Petar I, Belgrade, Serbia
		Team Sheet	Try: Philippe Vimond (13'), Christopher Rossa (24'c), Jean-Baptiste Vert (34'c), William Browne (58'c), John Fitzpatrick (65'c); Con: William Browne 4 Pen: William Browne (2')	Attendance: 350; Referee: (Hungary) Csaba Priskin

25 October 2014	Denmark	10–16	Slovenia	Odense Atletikstadion, Odense, Denmark
	Try: Victor Hounou (2'c); Con: Sebastian Hurst; Pen: Joshua Jensen (72')	Team Sheet	Try: Jernej Šercer (11'c); Con: Žiga Burnik; Pen: Žiga Burnik 2 (52', 62'); Drop: Žiga Burnik (24')	Referee: (Finland) George Mossford

8 November 2014	Luxembourg	18–13	Austria	Stade Josy Barthel, Luxembourg, Luxembourg
	Try: Francois Simon (20'c), Julien Da Col (52'); Con: William Browne; Pen: William Browne 2 (5', 46'); Cards: Jean-Baptiste Vert (yellow card) 36' to 46'	Team Sheet	Try: Jakob Liska (59'c); Con: Maximilian Freydell; Pen: Maximilian Navas (37'), Maximilian Freydell (78')	Attendance: 800; Referee: (Belgium) Ken Lasmbrecht

18 April 2015	Serbia	22–3	Austria

18 April 2015	Slovenia	11–14	Luxembourg

25 April 2015	Denmark	22–25	Serbia	Odense Atletikstadion, Odense, Denmark
		WR Team Sheet		Attendance: 1,155; Referee: (Sweden) Julian Bevan

25 April 2015	Austria	16–17	Slovenia	Vienna, Austria
		WR Team Sheet		Referee: (Serbia) Dejan Stiglic

9 May 2015	Luxembourg	13–5	Denmark	Stade Josy Barthel, Luxembourg, Luxembourg
	Try: Stuart Logier (19'), Yared Ketema (77'); Pen: William Browne (72')	Team Sheet	Try: Christian Mellgaard (80')	Referee: (Lithuania) Ramon Grumbinas

=== 2015–16 ===
Table

2015–16 Champions

Place	Nation	Games				Points			Bonus points	Table points
Place	Nation	played	won	drawn	lost	for	against	difference	Bonus points	Table points
1	Luxembourg	4	4	0	0	112	54	+58	2	18
2	Slovenia	4	3	0	1	102	85	+17	2	14
3	Serbia	4	2	0	2	90	95	−5	2	10
4	Austria	4	1	0	3	72	123	−51	1	5
5	Denmark	4	0	0	4	75	94	−19	5	5

Games

10 October 2015	Denmark	25–31	Austria	Odense Atletikstadion, Denmark
	Try: G. Hounou (28'c); T. Mayne (50'); M. Madsen (62'); C. Melgaard (77'); Con: J. Jensen (29'); Pen: J. Jensen (22')		Try: G. Chiu (17'c); S. Psota (34'c); M. Oberhauser (48'c); S. Pauser (73'c); Con: M. Navas (18', 35', 49', 74'); Pen: M. Navas (12')	Attendance: 600; Referee: (Belgium) John Catteau

24 October 2015	Austria	6–34	Luxembourg	Vienna, Austria
15:00 CEST (UTC+2)	Pen: Navas 7', 24'		Try: Browne 38'c Vert 43'c Rossa 63'c Olsen 80'c Con: Browne 38', 64', 80'; Bert 44'; Pen: Browne 3', 36'	Attendance: 500; Referee: (Russia) A. Bryzgalin

7 November 2015	Serbia	17–33	Slovenia	Belgrade, Serbia
	Try: P. Keglic 40'c B. Martic 49', 56'; Con: B. Martic 40'; Cards: M. Zivanov (yellow card) 41' to 51'; V. Radeka (yellow card) 61' to 71'		Try: B. Pilko 15'c Z. Vhunc 22'c M. Skofic 36'; A. Subic 44'c J. Skofic 77'c Con: Z. Burnik 16', 22', 45'; P. Kavcic 78'; Cards: L Popadec (yellow card) 28' to 38'	Referee: (Croatia) M. Jelavic

14 November 2015	Slovenia	21–16	Denmark	Ljubljana, Slovenia
14:00 CET (UTC+1)	Try: G. Okic 57'; L. Podpadec 70'c Con: P. Kavcic 71'; Pen: Z. Burnik 9', 35'; P. Kavcic 52'; Cards: G. Jelencic (yellow card) 67' to 77'		Try: C. Melgaard 44'; C. Orskov Olsen 79'; Pen: R. Groom 13', 27'; Cards: A. Robertson (yellow card) 51' to 61'; R. Pedersen (yellow card) 67' to 77'	Referee: (Romania) I. Bodea

14 November 2015	Luxembourg	30–24	Serbia	Luxembourg, Luxembourg
16:00 CET (UTC+1)	Try: C. Rossa 5'c T. Kremer 32'; A. Timmermans 40', 67'c Con: C. Keane 5'; W. Browne 67'; Pen: C. Keane 27'; Drop: C. Keane 18'; Cards: J. Vert (yellow card) 20' to 30'; A. Marcus (yellow card) 79' to 80'		Try: B. Martic 30'c P. Keglic 37'c J. Matijasevic 50'c Con: I. Dejanovic 31', 38'; B. Martic 51'; Pen: B. Martic 22'	Attendance: 1000; Referee: (Netherlands) G. Visser

9 April 2016	Austria	12–26	Serbia	Wiener Sportclub, Vienna, Austria
15:00 CEST (UTC+2)	Try: Alexander Radomirov 40'; Paul Hruschka 74'c Con: Maximilian Navas 75'; Cards: Stefan Psota (yellow card) 51' to 61'		Try: Aleksandar Djordjevic 15'c Predrag Keglic 30'; Marko Gvozdenović 43'c, 60'c Con: Boris Martic 16', 61'c Marko Gvozdenović 44'; Cards: Mirko Rankovic (yellow card) 40' to 50'; Aleksandar Djordjevic (yellow card) 71' to 80'	Attendance: 1,800; Referee: (Sweden) R. Aro

16 April 2016	Serbia	23–20	Denmark	Belgrade, Serbia
	Try: Marko Gvozdenović 34'c, 75'c Con: Boris Martic 35', 75'; Pen: Marko Gvozdenović 20', 40', 80'; Drop: Boris Martic (yellow card) 60' to 70'		Try: Andresa Robertson 16'; Christian Melgaard 58'; Gerard Hounou 68'c Con: Simon Holm 69'; Pen: Simon Holm 65'	Attendance: 200; Referee: (Ukraine) S. Poplavsky

30 April 2016	Denmark	14–19	Luxembourg	Odense, Denmark
	Try: 1 Pen: 3		Try: 2 Pen: 3	Referee: (Finland) G. Mossford

7 May 2016	Slovenia	38–23	Austria
16:00 CEST (UTC+2)	Try: 4 Con: 3 Pen: 4		Try: 2 Con: 2 Pen: 3	Referee: (Hungary) Priskin

14 May 2016	Luxembourg	29–10	Slovenia
				Referee: (Denmark) F. Himmer

=== 2014–2016 ===
Promoted to Rugby Europe Conference 1
Admitted to Rugby Europe Conference 2

Place	Nation	Games				Points			Bonus points	Table points
Place	Nation	played	won	drawn	lost	for	against	difference	Bonus points	Table points
1	Luxembourg (85)	8	8	0	0	193	83	+110	3	35
2	Slovenia (84)	8	6	0	2	194	128	+66	4	28
3	Serbia (83)	8	4	0	4	140	204	−64	2	18
4	Austria (82)	8	2	0	6	133	207	−74	3	11
5	Denmark (72)	8	0	0	8	139	177	−38	8	8

Pre-tournament IRB rankings in parentheses (as at 6 October 2014).

== Division 2D ==
The 2014–15 season game between Norway and Turkey, as well as the game between Finland and Bulgaria, were deferred to the 2015–16 season. The second match between Norway and Finland, as well as Turkey and Bulgaria, was played during the 2014–15 season, instead of during the 2015–16 season. This ensured all teams played four games in each season.

=== 2014–2015 ===
Table

2014–15 Champions

Place	Nation	Games				Points			Bonus points	Table points
Place	Nation	played	won	drawn	lost	for	against	difference	Bonus points	Table points
1	Bosnia and Herzegovina (93)	4	4	0	0	138	54	+84	1	17
2	Finland (101)	4	3	0	1	83	64	+19	2	14
3	Norway (95)	4	2	0	2	91	72	+19	3	11
4	Bulgaria (90)	4	1	0	3	51	145	−94	1	5
5	Turkey (NR)	4	0	0	4	80	108	−28	3	3

Pre-tournament IRB rankings in parentheses (as at 29 September 2014). Turkey are not a full member of the IRB, and therefore have no rating (NR).
Games

4 October 2014	Finland	32–10	Norway	Helsinki, Finland
	Try: Robert Hussey 2 (12'c, 70'c), Thomas Finell (29'c), Elias Korhonen (80'); Con: Thomas Finell 3 Pen: Thomas Finell 2 (2', 40')	Team Sheet	Try: Thierry Davy (14'), 1 try (38')	Attendance: 200; Referee: (Denmark) Michael Kristensen

4 October 2014	Bosnia and Herzegovina	59–12	Bulgaria	Zenica, Bosnia and Herzegovina
	Try: Armin Vehabović 2 (25'c, 35'c), Adi Milak (32'c), Samed Smajlović 2 (37', 68'c), Sabahudin Subašić (60'c), Adnan Hamzić (73'c); Con: Armin Vehabović 6 Pen: Armin Vehabović 4 (4', 12', 29', 51')	Team Sheet	Try: Stefan Avramov (21'c), Yavor Dragnev (56'); Con: Stefan Stefanov; Cards: Deyan Ivanov (yellow card) 30' to 40', Petar Aleksov (yellow card) 73' to 80'	Attendance: 100; Referee: (Switzerland) Matthew Sandell

25 October 2014	Turkey	25–34	Bosnia and Herzegovina	Edirne 25 Kasım Stadium, Edirne, Turkey
	Try: Sürer Bökeyhan 2 (18', 76'), Doruk Çelıkt (24'), Halıl Gözükücük (45'c); Con: Sürer Bökeyhan; Pen: Sürer Bökeyhan (50'); Cards: Ramazan Kabak (red card) 55'	Team Sheet	Try: Armin Vehabović (11'c), Sabahudin Subašić (57'), Zijad Ajkunić (69'c); Con: Armin Vehabović 2 Pen: Armin Vehabović 5 (2', 7', 40', 43', 48'); Cards: Sedad Tufekčić (yellow card) 33' to 43'	Attendance: 200; Referee: (Ukraine) Sergii Poplavyski

1 November 2014	Bulgaria	26–19	Turkey	Sofia, Bulgaria
	Try: Stefan Avramov (22'c), Antonio Ivanov (33'c), Danail Andreev (45'), Aleksandar Tomanov (62'c); Con: Stefan Stefanov 3 Cards: Stefan Stefanov (yellow card) 49' to 59', Stefan Avramov (yellow card) 52' to 62', Antonio Ivanov (yellow card) 70' to 80'	Team Sheet	Try: Zakır Kalabas (10'), Mehmet Dumrul (39'c), Sezer Demırel (41'c); Con: Zakır Kalabas 2 Cards: Halıl Gözükücük (yellow card) 51' to 61'	Attendance: 700; Referee: (Switzerland) Yann Benoît

25 April 2015	Bosnia and Herzegovina	29–7	Finland	Stadion Kamberovića polje, Zenica, Bosnia and Herzegovina
		WR Team Sheet		Referee: (Romania) Serban Cristian

9 May 2015	Bosnia and Herzegovina	16–10	Norway	Zenica, Bosnia and Herzegovina
	Try: Sabahudin Subašić (75'c); Con: Armin Vehabović; Pen: Armin Vehabović 3 (2', 55', 65')	Team Sheet	Try: Kasper Solli (47'c); Con: Nathan Cummins; Pen: Nathan Cummins (17')	Attendance: 500; Referee: (Hungary) Csaba Priskin

23 May 2015	Finland	20–12	Turkey	Helsinki, Finland
	Try: Kalle Valimaki (15'); Robert Hussey (24'c); Kalle Hellin (33'); Con: Thomas Finell 1 Pen: Henri Repo (62')		Try: Zakir Kalabas (56'); Yasin Bakar (78'c); Con: Ibrahim Demircan 1 Cards: Bahri Dagli (yellow card) 13' to 23'

23 May 2015	Norway	43–0	Bulgaria	Bergen, Norway
	Try: Pierre Rougelle (14'c); Pascal Raclin (21'c); Kasper Solli (27'); Kristoffer Borsheim (35', 72'); Fredrik Skolvy (42'c); Nicolas Barral (49'c); Con: Nathan Cummins 4 Cards: Axel Wilhelmsen (yellow card) 58' to 68'		Cards: Georgi Vaklinov (yellow card) 34' to 44'; Spartak Ignatov (yellow card) 41' to 51'

7 May 2016	Norway	28–24	Turkey	Norway
	Try: 4 Con: 4		Try: 3 Con: 3 Pen: 1

28 May 2016	Finland	24–13	Bulgaria	Finland
	Try: 4 Con: 2		Try: 2 Pen: 1

=== 2015–16 ===
Table

2015–16 Champions

Place	Nation	Games				Points			Bonus points	Table points
Place	Nation	played	won	drawn	lost	for	against	difference	Bonus points	Table points
1	Bosnia and Herzegovina	4	4	0	0	92	59	+33	2	18
2	Turkey	4	3	0	1	115	69	46	2	14
3	Norway	4	2	0	2	60	81	−21	0	8
4	Bulgaria	4	1	0	3	90	82	+8	3	7
5	Finland	4	0	0	4	45	111	−66	1	1

Games

18 October 2014	Norway	20–12	Finland	Bislett Stadion, Oslo, Norway
	Try: Kristoffer Borsheim (31'); Pen: Kristoffer Borsheim 5 (2', 20', 24', 44', 73'); Cards: Daniel Krolak (yellow card) 50' to 60', Alastair Reed (yellow card) 65' to 75'	Team Sheet	Try: Thomas Finell 2 (39', 66'c); Con: Thomas Finell	Attendance: 300; Referee: (Denmark) Michael Vestorp

25 April 2015	Turkey	28–26	Bulgaria	Antalya, Turkey
		WR Team Sheet		Referee: (Greece) Kalaxilos

3 October 2015	Finland	6–12	Bosnia and Herzegovina	Finland

3 October 2015	Bulgaria	15–16	Norway	Bulgaria

17 October 2015	Bosnia and Herzegovina	24–21	Turkey	Kamberovic Polje, Zenica, Bosnia & Herzegovina
	Try: Z. Stanković (17'); S. Turčinović (28'); H Oruč (43'c); D. Durgut (52'c); Con: S. Subašić (44', 53'); Cards: S. Glavaš (yellow card) 54' to 64'; Z. Stanković (yellow card) 63' to 73'		Try: M. Erturk (58'); Penalty Try (72'c); Con: B. Erdener (73'); Pen: B. Erdener (21', 24', 34'); Cards: Z. Kalabas (yellow card) 73' to 80'	Attendance: 400

24 October 2015	Bulgaria	34–15	Finland	Sofia, Bulgaria
15:00 EEST (UTC+3)	Try: Gavrilov 14'; Marinov 29'c Borisov 52'c, 58'; Todorov 69'c Con: Debrenliev 29'; Nikolov 53', 70'; Pen: Nikolov 45'; Cards: Borisov (yellow card) 71' to 80'		Try: Valimaki 64'c Harrod 79'; Con: Viljanen 65'; Pen: Viljanen 2'	Attendance: 1,000; Referee: (Romania) R. Diaconescu

16 April 2016	Norway	17–33	Bosnia and Herzegovina	Norway
	Try: Russel Watson 11'; Nathan Cummins 35'c Sondre Gundersen 41'; Con: Bård Berthelsen 36'; Cards: Levan Abramishvili (yellow card) 52' to 62'		Try: Darijo PETRUŠIĆ 17'; Sejad KADIĆ 21'c Fadil SPAHIĆ 45'c Haris ORUČ 70'c Adnan HAMZIĆ 79'c Con: Sabahudin SUBAŠIĆ 21', 45', 71', 79'	Attendance: 300; Referee: (Denmark) Kristensen Michael

23 April 2016	Turkey	45–12	Finland	Sorumlusu Futbol Antrenoru, Turkey
	Try: 8 HALİL GÖZÜKÜÇÜK 8'c, 36'c 13 AYKUT KANAÇLAR 22'; 10 ALİ SÜRER 44'c, 56'c 15 ZAKİR KALABAŞ 64'; 21 A.DORUK ÇELİKTUTAN 76'c Con: 10 ALİ SÜRER 9', 37', 45', 57', 77'		Try: 18 Juha Rainvuori 41'c 10 Jussi Viljanen 79'; Con: 10 Juss Viljanen 42'	Attendance: 200; Referee: (Georgia (country)) Shota Tevzadze

30 April 2016	Turkey	21–7	Norway	Turkey

7 May 2016	Bulgaria	15–23	Bosnia and Herzegovina	Bulgaria
	Try: 2 Con: 1 Pen: 1		Try: 2 Con: 2 Pen: 3

=== 2014–2016 ===
To 2016–17 Rugby Europe Conference 2
Relegated to 2016–17 Rugby Europe Development

Place	Nation	Games				Points			Bonus points	Table points
Place	Nation	played	won	drawn	lost	for	against	difference	Bonus points	Table points
1	Bosnia and Herzegovina (93)	8	8	0	0	230	113	+117	4	36
2	Norway (95)	8	4	0	4	151	153	−2	3	19
3	Turkey (NR)	8	3	0	5	195	177	+18	5	17
4	Finland (101)	8	3	0	5	128	175	−47	3	15
5	Bulgaria (90)	8	2	0	6	141	227	−86	4	12

Pre-tournament IRB rankings in parentheses (as at 29 September 2014). Turkey are not a full member of the IRB, and therefore have no rating (NR).
