= Cyprus national rugby union team =

National rugby union team

Cyprus
- Union: Cyprus Rugby Federation
- Nickname: The Mighty Mouflons
- Emblem: Mouflon
- Ground(s): Stelios Kyriakides Stadium, Paphos
- President: Constantinos Constantinides
- Coach: Marcus Holden
- Captain: Billy Cosma
- Most caps: Georgios Agathokleous
- Top scorer: Marcus Holden (470)
- Most tries: Georgios Agathokleous (30)
Team kit	Change kit

First international
- Cyprus 39–3 Greece (24 March 2007)

Largest win
- Bulgaria 3–94 Cyprus (28 May 2012)

Largest defeat
- Latvia 31–3 Cyprus (7 November 2015); Malta 31 – 3 Cyprus (29 October 2016)

World Cup
- Appearances: 0

The Cyprus national rugby union team is nicknamed ‘’The Mighty Mouflons’’ after a native wild horned sheep which is also the republic's national animal. Cyprus won 28 of their first 30 games from 2007–2015 and hold the world record for the most consecutive international men's rugby union tests wins with 24, which ended on 15 November 2014 in a loss Latvia. They were controversially disqualified from the knock-out phase of the 2015 Rugby World Cup Qualifiers, as they did not meet the necessary membership criteria according to the International Rugby Board.

== History ==
The first international game of the Cyprus national rugby union team took place on 24 March 2007 against Greece in Paphos. The Cypriot XV won the game by 39-3 in front of 2,500 fans setting a world record for largest win in début match.

In October and November 2007, Cyprus beat Azerbaijan, Monaco and Slovakia to win the 2006–08 European Nations Cup Division 3D, in their first year on the international scene. However, they lost the play-off game for promotion to Division 3C for the 2008–10 European Nations Cup on 6 September 2008 against Israel by a score of 23–14. This would be Cyprus' only loss in international rugby for the next six years.

=== Record setting win streak ===
The following season, Cyprus had another attempt to be promoted as they played Bosnia and Herzegovina, Azerbaijan and Monaco in a round-robin home-and-away basis. They won every game scoring a total of 187 points and conceding only 17. They gained automatic promotion to Division 3B, although, for the following season, the divisions had changed numbers, so instead of moving to Division 3B, they were in fact in Division 2D.

The 2010–12 European Nations Cup saw Cyprus play in Division 2D (the lowest level of the second division) against Bulgaria, Finland, Greece and Luxembourg. They won all their games for the second consecutive year increasing their win success to 15 and making it two consecutive seasons and nearly four years unbeaten. They scored 4 or more tries in each of their games during the 2010–2012 season, including an emphatic 94–3 win over Bulgaria, and were promoted to Division 2C for 2012–2014.

Their 2012–14 European Nations Cup Division 2B campaign kicked off in style with a 54–20 win over Austria. They followed that win with consecutive home and away wins against Slovenia, Bulgaria and Hungary and also a home win over Austria. On 16 March 2013 ahead of their match against Bulgaria, Cyprus were aware of a potential world record of 18 games unbeaten which would overtake the men's official record of 17 games originally held by both New Zealand (between 1965 and 1969 and again between 2013 and 2014), South Africa (between 1997 and 1998) and Lithuania (between 2006 and 2010). They won the match comfortably 79–10. A month later, Cyprus were informed that they would not be eligible to qualify for the 2015 Rugby World Cup and were disqualified by the International Rugby Board due to 'not meeting the necessary membership criteria'.

Cyprus played in Division 2B for the 2014–16 European Nations Cup, where they were grouped with Lithuania, Latvia, Andorra and Hungary.

Listed below are several world records and achievements Cyprus set during their world record 24 match winning streak:

- World record for most consecutive men's international rugby union test wins (24), which ended in a 39–20 loss to Latvia on 15 November 2014.
- World record for most consecutive international rugby union wins by greater than a converted try (14).
- World record for most consecutive international rugby union matches scoring 4 or more tries (11).
- Won 11 away games in a row, tied for second most all time.
- Won 10 consecutive matches by 30-plus points between 2011–2013, which ended in a 16–15 victory over Hungary.

== Motto ==
The Cyprus Rugby Federation has adopted as its motto the famous Spartan phrase:

Ἢ τὰν ἢ ἐπὶ τᾶς, translating as "either with this or upon this", an idiom that effectively means victory or death. The origin of the motto is ancient Sparta and "this" refers to the shield. Spartans killed in battle were carried home on the shield, while those returning alive and victorious from battle would still have it. A soldier fleeing the battle would have to drop the shield.

== Kit ==
Home

2013/14

Away

2013/14

== Home grounds ==
Until March 2010, Cyprus did not have a National Stadium, due to the poor recognition of the government they did not supply a stadium. Cyprus' first international was played in Paphos at Kiniras Sports ground. Then a further game at the same ground in the ENC 3D tournament against Slovakia. They then moved to the British Army base playing their games at Happy Valley in Episkopi. Now the national stadium has been recognised as Pafiako Stadium which is situated in the centre of Paphos. It holds a capacity of 10,000.

Ground	Record	Recent Win	Team	Recent Draw	Recent Loss
Pafiako Stadium, Paphos	77,8%	2018	Slovenia	N/A	6 May 2017
Happy Valley, Episkopi	100%	2009	Slovakia	N/A	N/A
Kiniras Sports Ground, Paphos	100%	2007	Slovakia	N/A	N/A

== Performances ==
Rugby Europe International Championships

- European Nations Cup Second Division 2C: (2) 2012–13, 2013–14
- European Nations Cup Second Division 2D: (2) 2010–11, 2011–12
- Rugby Europe Conference South: (1) 2017–18

== List of test matches ==
Cyprus only lost 15 out their first fifty test matches. They recorded their first win over Malta on 23 November by 18–16 to celebrate their 50th international.

Cyprus are not a full member of the International Rugby Board, so none of their international matches count towards the IRB World Rankings.

Date	Home	Score	Away	Venue	Competition
24 March 2007	Cyprus	39 – 3	Greece	Paphos	Friendly (First International)
29 October 2007	Cyprus	29 – 0	Azerbaijan	Paphos	2006-08 ENC 3D
31 October 2007	Cyprus	19 – 10	Monaco	Nicosia	2006-08 ENC 3D
3 November 2007	Cyprus	38 – 8	Slovakia	Paphos	2006-08 ENC 3D
6 September 2008	Israel	23 – 14	Cyprus	Netanya	2006-08 ENC 3C/3D play-off
29 November 2008	Azerbaijan	3 – 37	Cyprus	Baku	2008-10 ENC 3D
6 December 2008	Cyprus	24 – 3	Monaco	Episkopi	2008-10 ENC 3D
14 March 2009	Cyprus	33 – 7	Slovakia	Episkopi	2008-10 ENC 3D
21 March 2009	Bosnia and Herzegovina	6 – 8	Cyprus	Zenica	2008-10 ENC 3D
14 November 2009	Monaco	5 – 44	Cyprus	Monaco	2008-10 ENC 3D
6 March 2010	Cyprus	59 – 0	Azerbaijan	Paphos	2008-10 ENC 3D
27 March 2010	Cyprus	15 – 0	Bosnia and Herzegovina	Paphos	2008-10 ENC 3D
20 November 2010	Greece	13 – 33	Cyprus	Athens	2010-12 ENC 2D
12 March 2011	Cyprus	55 – 8	Bulgaria	Paphos	2010-12 ENC 2D
26 March 2011	Cyprus	70 – 10	Finland	Paphos	2010-12 ENC 2D
7 May 2011	Luxembourg	0 – 50	Cyprus	Luxembourg	2010-12 ENC 2D
8 October 2011	Cyprus	48 – 7	Luxembourg	Paphos	2010-12 ENC 2D
28 April 2012	Bulgaria	3 – 94	Cyprus	Pernik	2010-12 ENC 2D
26 May 2012	Cyprus	72 – 5	Greece	Paphos	2010-12 ENC 2D
9 June 2012	Finland	5 – 52	Cyprus	Helsinki	2010-12 ENC 2D
17 November 2012	Austria	20 – 54	Cyprus	Vienna	2012-14 ENC 2C
8 December 2012	Cyprus	49 – 8	Slovenia	Paphos	2012-14 ENC 2C
16 March 2013	Cyprus	79 – 10	Bulgaria	Paphos	2012-14 ENC 2C
20 April 2013	Hungary	15 – 16	Cyprus	Esztergom	2012-14 ENC 2C
9 November 2013	Slovenia	3 – 34	Cyprus	Ljubljana	2012-14 ENC 2C
30 November 2013	Cyprus	22 – 8	Austria	Paphos	2012-14 ENC 2C
26 April 2014	Bulgaria	15 – 46	Cyprus	Sofia	2012-14 ENC 2C
17 May 2014	Cyprus	46 – 13	Hungary	Paphos	2012-14 ENC 2C
1 November 2014	Cyprus	30 – 10	Andorra	Paphos	2014-16 ENC 2B
15 November 2014	Latvia	39 – 20	Cyprus	Riga	2014-16 ENC 2B
28 March 2015	Hungary	15 – 17	Cyprus	Szazhalombatta	2014-16 ENC 2B
2 May 2015	Cyprus	20 – 26	Lithuania	Paphos	2014-16 ENC 2B
7 November 2015	Cyprus	3 – 31	Latvia	Paphos	2014-16 ENC 2B
28 November 2015	Andorra	22 – 13	Cyprus	Andorra la Vella	2014-16 ENC 2B
9 April 2016	Cyprus	15 – 3	Hungary	Paphos	2014-16 ENC 2B
23 April 2016	Lithuania	47 – 15	Cyprus	Vilnius	2014-16 ENC 2B
23 October 2016	Malta	31 – 3	Cyprus	Paola	2016-17 Conference 1 South
12 November 2016	Cyprus	28 – 38	Israel	Paphos	2016-17 Conference 1 South
11 February 2017	Andorra	15 – 14	Cyprus	Andorra la Vella	2016-17 Conference 1 South
6 May 2017	Cyprus	27 – 29	Croatia	Paphos	2016-17 Conference 1 South
11 November 2017	Cyprus	42 – 5	Austria	Paphos	2017-18 Conference 2 South
14 November 2017	Slovakia	6 – 38	Cyprus	Piestany	2017-18 Conference 2 South
24 March 2018	Cyprus	17 – 5	Slovenia	Paphos	2017-18 Conference 2 South
28 April 2018	Serbia	35 – 17	Cyprus	Belgrade	2017-18 Conference 2 South
20 October 2018	Croatia	46 – 24	Cyprus	Split	2018-19 Conference 1 South
10 November 2018	Cyprus	22 – 34	Israel	Paphos	2018-19 Conference 1 South
23 March 2019	Cyprus	10 – 37	Malta	Paphos	2018-19 Conference 1 South
6 April 2019	Bosnia and Herzegovina	22 – 23	Cyprus	Zenica	2018-19 Conference 1 South
19 October 2019	Cyprus	20 – 25	Croatia	Paphos	2018-19 Conference 1 South
23 November 2019	Malta	16 – 18	Cyprus	Paola	2018-19 Conference 1 South
13 November 2021	Cyprus	8 – 29	Croatia	Paphos	2021-22 Conference 1 South
26 March 2022	Cyprus	28 – 0	Slovenia	Paphos	2022-23 Conference 1 South
16 April 2022	Malta	27 – 10	Cyprus	Paola	2022-23 Conference 1 South
1 October 2022	Slovenia	7 – 56	Cyprus	Ljubljana	2022-23 Conference 1 South
12 November 2022	Cyprus	21 – 22	Israel	Paphos	2022-23 Conference 1 South
25 March 2023	Malta	41 – 24	Cyprus	Paola	2022-23 Conference 1 South
13 May 2023	Cyprus	35 – 17	Bulgaria	Nicosia	2022-23 Conference 1 South
4 November 2023	Malta	22 – 17	Cyprus	Paola	2023–24 Rugby Europe Conference Pool D
4 May 2024	Cyprus	14 – 24	Malta	Limassol	2023–24 Rugby Europe Conference Pool D
5 October 2024	Malta	43 – 21	Cyprus	Paola	2024–25 Rugby Europe International Championships Pool D
5 April 2025	Cyprus	19 – 28	Andorra	Limassol	2024–25 Rugby Europe International Championships Pool D

== Overall ==
Below is a table of the representative rugby matches played by a Cyprus national XV at test level up until 17 October 2026, updated after match with Gibraltar.

Against	Played	Won	Lost	Drawn	Points for	Points against	Points diff	% Won
Andorra	4	1	3	0	76	75	+1	25%
Austria	3	3	0	0	118	33	+85	100%
Azerbaijan	3	3	0	0	125	3	+122	100%
Bosnia and Herzegovina	3	3	0	0	46	28	+18	100%
Bulgaria	5	5	0	0	309	53	+256	100%
Croatia	4	0	4	0	79	129	–50	0%
Finland	2	2	0	0	122	15	+107	100%
Gibraltar	1	1	0	0	48	17	+31	100%
Greece	3	3	0	0	144	21	+123	100%
Hungary	4	4	0	0	94	46	+48	100%
Israel	6	0	6	0	118	153	–35	0%
Latvia	2	0	2	0	23	70	–47	0%
Lithuania	2	0	2	0	35	73	–38	0%
Luxembourg	2	2	0	0	98	7	+91	100%
Malta	10	1	9	0	135	284	–159	10%
Monaco	3	3	0	0	87	18	+69	100%
Serbia	1	0	1	0	17	35	–18	0%
Slovakia	3	3	0	0	109	21	+88	100%
Slovenia	7	7	0	0	268	30	+238	100%
Total	67	40	27	0	1867	994	+877	59.7%

== Coaches ==
Name	Years	Tests	Won	Drew	Lost	Win percentage
Niall Doherty	2007–2008	4	4	0	0	100%
Paul Shanks	2008–2014	24	23	0	1	96%
Phil Llewellyn	2014–2015	4	2	0	2	50%
Paul Shanks	2015–2015	1	0	0	1	0%
Alexander Zavallis	2015–2015	1	0	0	1	0%
Andrew Binikos	2016–2025	11	4	0	7	36%
Andrew Barnett	2018–2025	9	3	0	6	33%

== Current squad ==
The following players formed the squad for the 2024–25 Rugby Europe Conference match against Andorra.

- Known Caps updated after match with Croatia.

Note: Flags indicate national union for the club/province as defined by World Rugby.

Player	Position	Date of birth (age)	Caps	Club/province
George Cosma	Prop	20 December 1997 (age 28)		(England) Eton Manor
Pantelis Stylianou	Hooker	17 April 2002 (age 24)		(England) CS Stags
Stylianos Panagiotou	Prop	28 November 1996 (age 29)		(England) Doncaster Phoenix
Billy Cosma (c)	Lock			(England) Epping
Marcus Kay	Lock	5 July 2003 (age 23)		(England) University of Leeds
Joe Ridgewell	Flanker			(England) Manchester RFC
Marko Mladenovic	Flanker	24 December 1990 (age 35)	12	(Scotland) Murrayfield Wanderers FC
Giovanni Dall'Amico	Number 8	7 February 1997 (age 29)		
William Yiannakou	Scrum-half	28 November 1993 (age 32)		
Marcus Holden	Fly-half	22 August 1989 (age 37)	30	(Scotland) Stirling County
Joakim Antoniou	Wing	4 June 1986 (age 40)		(England) Henley Hawks
George Agathocleous	Centre	23 January 1982 (age 44)	22	(Cyprus) Paphos Tigers
Benjamin Yarrow	Centre	31 January 2003 (age 23)		(Scotland) Stirling County
Vaki Antoniou	Wing	12 May 2000 (age 26)		(England) Charlton Park RFC
Dominic Georgiou	Fullback	24 June 1988 (age 38)		(England) Old Brodleians
Dimitri Grigoriou	Hooker	28 November 1995 (age 30)		
Farhad Fayaz	Prop	3 September 2003 (age 23)		(England) University of Bath
Stylianos Panagiotou	Prop	28 November 1996 (age 29)		(England) Doncaster Phoenix
James Hebbard	Back row	19 November 1996 (age 29)		
Robert Yiannakou	Back row	3 October 1996 (age 30)		
George Shaouna	Wing	5 July 1999 (age 27)		
Philippos Pouroullis	Wing	7 September 1987 (age 39)		
Leslie Mabaleka	Scrum-half	29 June 1999 (age 27)		

Staff

- Head Coach - Andrew Barnett
- Coach - Alexander Zavallis Roebuck
- Team Manager - Peter Morrish
- Physio - Theo Lenos

== See also ==
- Rugby union in Cyprus
- Cyprus Rugby Federation
