= Estadi Nacional =

Former home stadium of the Andorran National Football Team

Coordinates: 42.5046°N 1.5175°E

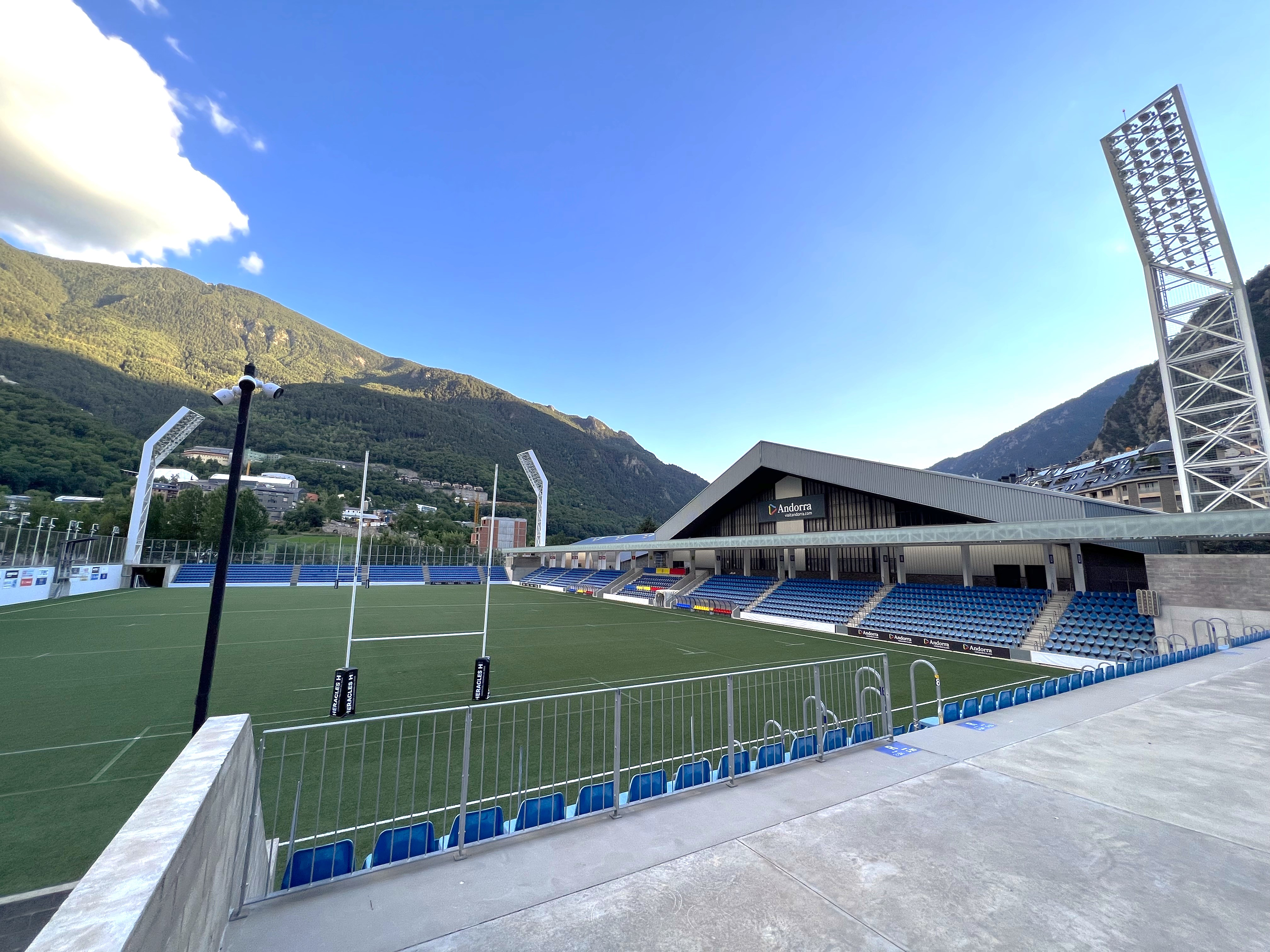
- Interactive map of Estadi Nacional
- Full name: Estadi Nacional d'Andorra
- Location: Andorra la Vella, Andorra
- Capacity: 3,306
- Surface: Artificial turf
- Record attendance: 3,631; FC Andorra v Albacete Balompié (8 May 2022)

Construction
- Groundbreaking: 2013
- Opened: 2014

Tenants
- Andorra national football team Andorra national rugby union team FC Andorra (2021–2025)

The Estadi Nacional is a stadium located in Andorra la Vella. It was formerly the national stadium of Andorra and is used for association football and rugby union.

It has a capacity of 3,306, and the pitch is made of artificial turf.

== History ==
The stadium was built at the former ground of the Camp d'Esports del M.I. Consell General. Construction started in 2013 and finished in 2014.

The stadium is the home of the Andorra national football team and the Andorra national rugby union team. The first official match was a 1–2 defeat to Wales valid for the UEFA Euro 2016 qualifying Group B, played on 9 September 2014, after the 3G artificial pitch passed UEFA inspection a week before the match.

In August 2015, the National Government and FC Andorra agreed that the club would play in the Estadi Nacional the two first months of the 2015–16 season, until the works in the Camp de la Borda Mateu finish.

In July 2021, the Government of Andorra reached an agreement with FC Andorra for playing their matches of Primera División RFEF in this stadium. In July 2025, FC Andorra left this stadium to move to the new Estadi de la FAF, which has a hybrid grass pitch and a larger capacity, to adapt to the requirements of Spanish professional football.

=== Television gantry fire ===
On 8 October 2021, one day before Andorra were due to play England in a 2022 FIFA World Cup Qualifier, a fire broke out in the stadium's television gantry. There was extensive damage to the metal gantry and the television equipment within, one of the pitchside VAR monitors was destroyed, some of the seating in one of the dugouts melted and part of the artificial turf was scorched. Repairs were made in the following hours, so that the match was able to go ahead at the stadium, in spite of the fire.

== Attendances to official games ==
As of 9 October 2021

=== Andorra men's national football team ===
Season	Total	High	Low	Average
Euro 2016	11,778	3,150	1,054	2,354
2018 World Cup	10,484	3,193	1,115	2,097
2018–19 Nations League	3,567	1,311	1,021	1,189
Euro 2020	9,718	3,187	947	1,944
2022 World Cup (Note: Two games with limited attendance due to COVID-19 pandemic.)	4,308	2,285	285	1,077
2022–23 Nations League	2,790	1,102	756	930
Euro 2024	8,218	2,927	568	1,644
2024–25 Nations League	1,796	984	812	898
2026 World Cup (Note: Only one match played at Estadi Nacional.)	957	957	957	957

=== Andorra women's national football team ===
Season	Total	High	Low	Average
2023–24 Nations League	1,572	813	156	524
2025 Euro	1,230	428	376	410
2025 Nations League (Note: Only one match played at Estadi Nacional.)	407	407	407	407

=== Rugby games ===
Season	Total	High	Low	Average
2014–16 European Nations Cup	1,300	500	300	433
2016–17 Rugby Europe Conference	1,400	1,000	400	700
2017–18 Rugby Europe Conference	1,100	600	500	550
2018–19 Rugby Europe Conference	1,000	600	400	500
