= Stelios Kyriakides Stadium =

Sports venue in Paphos, Cyprus

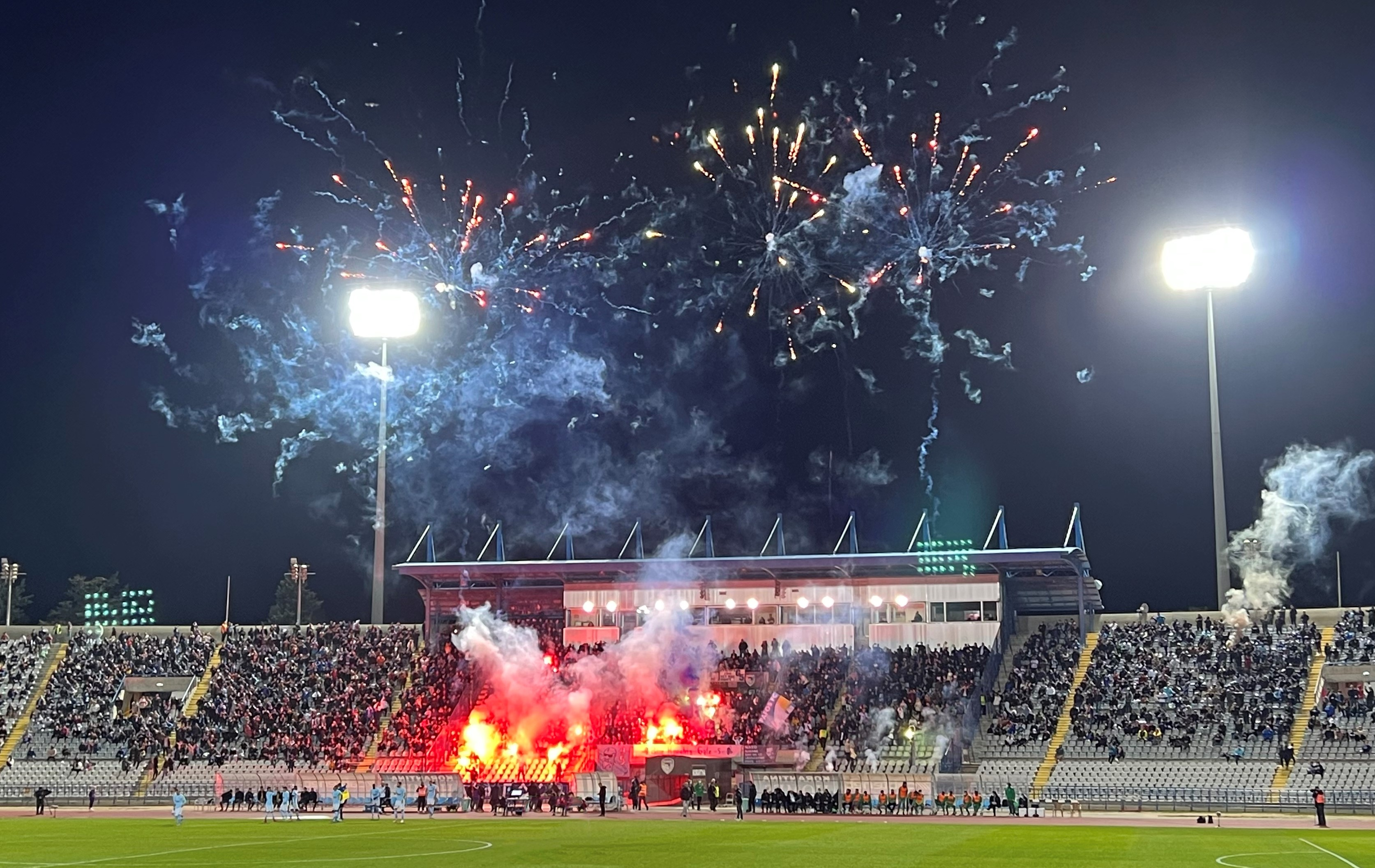
- Interactive map of Stelios Kyriakides Stadium
- Full name: Paphiako Athletic Center 'Stelios Kyriakides'
- Location: Paphos, Cyprus
- Coordinates: 34°46′09.07″N 32°26′24.52″E
- Owner: Cyprus Sport Organisation (Greek: Κυπριακός Οργανισμός Αθλητισμού)
- Capacity: 9,394
- Surface: Grass
- Record attendance: 9,000 (Pafos FC vs AEK Larnaca FC, 18 May 2025)
- Field size: 102 m × 65 m (335 ft × 213 ft)

Construction
- Opened: 1985
- Renovated: 2003

Tenants
- APOP Paphos (1985–2000); Evagoras Paphos (1985–2000); AEP Paphos (2000–2014); APOP Kinyras (2005–2006); AEK Kouklia (2013–2014); Pafos FC (2014–present); AEZ Zakakiou (2016–2017); Karmiotissa FC (2020–2021, 2023–2024); Akritas Chlorakas (2022–2023, 2025–2026); Cyprus national rugby union team (2007–present)

The Stelios Kyriakides Stadium (previous Pafiako Stadium) (Greek: Στάδιο Στέλιος Κυριακίδης) is a multi-use stadium in Paphos, the stadium holds 9,394 people. It has a full size running track around the outside of its football and rugby playing field and is used for many athletics events throughout the year. It is regarded as one of the best pitches in Cyprus and situated ideally for the public. Until 25 May 2017 its name was Pafiako Stadium (Greek: Παφιακό Στάδιο), but the Cyprus Sport Organisation changed its name to Stelios Kyriakides Stadium after marathon runner Stelios Kyriakides.

It is the home stadium of Akritas Chlorakas and Pafos FC. It was also the home stadium also of AEP Paphos, AEK Kouklia, APOP and Evagoras and was used also as home by APOP Kinyras Peyias when they were playing in the First Division during 2005–06 season. GSK Stadium, or Gymnastic Club Korivos Stadium was the home of APOP and Evagoras before the Pafiako was built. In 1992, the UEFA European Under-16 Football Championship was hosted in Cyprus and three matches of the tournament were hosted in Pafiako stadium. Also various music venues took place here.

The stadium has also become the home of the National Rugby Team of Cyprus, having played a total of 3 games there and winning all. The first game of the European 3D tournament in 2007 between Cyprus and Azerbaijan was played there. The stadium has only become the official national team stadium since 2010, where Cyprus overcame Azerbaijan and Bosnia respectively to gain promotion into the 2nd tier of European Rugby. It also hosted the final stage of the European Sevens in a two-day tournament.

On 25 May 2017, K.O.A (Cyprus Athletic Association) decided to rename the stadium to Στέλιος Κυριακίδης (Stelios Kyriakides Stadium) in honor of the Boston Marathon of 1946 winner from Statos Agios Fotios village.
