= Slovenia national rugby union team =

National rugby union team

Slovenia
- Nicknames: Encijani, Gentians
- Union: Rugby zveza Slovenije
- Head coach: Peter Kavčič
- Captain: Enej Radelj Šemrov
First colours

World Rugby ranking
- Current: 82 (as of 16 November 2024)
- Highest: 76 (4 April 2022)

First international
- Slovenia 21 - 19 Austria (1992-05-31)

Biggest win
- Slovenia 91 - 5 Slovakia (2019-05-18)

Biggest defeat
- Slovenia 0 - 88 Switzerland (2012-05-17)

The Slovenia national rugby union team is governed by the Rugby zveza Slovenije, and has yet to qualify for the Rugby World Cup.

The national side is ranked 82nd in the world, as of 4 November 2024.

== Current players ==
Name	Caps	Club/Province	Club rugby played
Radelj Šemrov Enej (Captain)	28	Blackburn R. U. F. C.	(England)
Mihelič Igor	12	RAK Olimpija	(Slovenia)
Mostar Simon	5	RAK Olimpija	(Slovenia)
Sajevic Jaka	18	RK Ljubljana	(Slovenia)
Puš Tadej	2	RK Ljubljana	(Slovenia)
Pilko Blaž	18	RK Ljubljana	(Slovenia)
Okič Igor	5	RK Ljubljana	(Slovenia)
Fogec Žan	1	RK Ljubljana	(Slovenia)
Hočevar Tit	46	RK Ljubljana	(Slovenia)
Gobec Peter	34	RK Ljubljana	(Slovenia)
Kovacic Michael	4	Rosslyn Park FC	(England)
Miljuš Grega	44	RK Ljubljana	(Slovenia)
Šercer Jernej	23	RK Ljubljana	(Slovenia)
Dobnikar Domen	10	RK Ljubljana	(Slovenia)
Skofic Max	9	Sedgley Park Tigers	(England)
Delmas Guillaume	5	USO Massif Central(France)	(France)
Lah Lev	3	RK Ljubljana	(Slovenia)
Javornik Iztok	13	RK Ljubljana	(Slovenia)
Skofic Jack	10	Tarleton Rugby Union Football Club	(England)
Burnik Žiga	26	RK Ljubljana	(Slovenia)
Sambol Lovro	19	RK Ljubljana	(Slovenia)
Kavčič Peter	34	RK Ljubljana	(Slovenia)
Skofic Frank Joseph	14	Blackburn R. U. F. C.	(England)
Skofic George	8	Blackburn R. U. F. C.	(England)
Troppan Anže	25	RK Ljubljana	(Slovenia)
Okič Gal	18	RK Ljubljana	(Slovenia)
Železnik Črt	10	RK Ljubljana	(Slovenia)

== Record ==
Below is a table of the representative rugby matches played by a Slovenia national XV at test level up until 17 October 2026, updated after match with Croatia.

Against	Played	Won	Lost	Drawn	Win percentage
Andorra	7	3	4	0	42.86%
Armenia	2	0	2	0	0%
Austria	25	12	13	0	48%
Belgium	3	1	2	0	33.33%
Bosnia and Herzegovina	6	4	2	0	66.67%
Bulgaria	5	2	3	0	40%
Croatia	12	3	9	0	25%
Cyprus	4	0	4	0	0%
Czech Republic	1	1	0	0	100%
Denmark	7	5	2	0	71.43%
Finland	2	2	0	0	100%
Hungary	14	9	5	0	64.29%
Israel	6	2	3	1	33.33%
Kosovo	1	1	0	0	100%
Lithuania	2	1	0	1	50%
Luxembourg	7	2	5	0	28.57%
Malta	4	1	3	0	25%
Moldova	2	2	0	0	100%
Monaco	4	2	2	0	50%
Montenegro	1	1	0	0	100%
Norway	2	2	0	0	100%
Serbia	8	5	3	0	62.5%
Slovakia	3	3	0	0	100%
Spain	1	0	1	0	0%
Switzerland	5	1	3	1	20%
Turkey	1	1	0	0	100%
Ukraine	1	0	1	0	0%
Yugoslavia	1	0	1	0	0%
Total	136	65	68	3	47.79%

== Results ==
Results of Slovenia's games at the 2018–19 Rugby Europe Conference 2 South

Champions and Promoted
Possible Relegation

Place	Nation	Games				Points			Try BP	Losing BP	Grand Slam BP	Table points
Place	Nation	played	won	drawn	lost	for	against	difference	Try BP	Losing BP	Grand Slam BP	Table points
1	Slovenia	4	3	0	1	191	67	+124	2	0	0	14
2	Bulgaria	4	3	0	1	125	98	+27	0	0	0	12
3	Serbia	4	2	0	2	101	105	-4	1	1	0	10
4	Andorra	4	2	0	2	94	103	−9	1	0	0	9
5	Slovakia	4	0	0	4	53	191	−138	0	0	0	0
Points were awarded to the teams as follows: Win – 4 points : Draw – 2 points : Loss within 7 points – 1 point : Loss greater than 7 points – 0 points: At least 3 more tries than opponent- 1 point Completing a Grand Slam – 1 point

20 October 2018
14:00 CEST (UTC+02)

(1 TBP) Slovenia	48–14	Andorra
	Gamesheet

Rugby stadion OVAL, Ljubljana
Attendance: 400
Referee: (Croatia) Hrvoje Bartolić

27 October 2018
16:00 CEST (UTC+02)

Bulgaria	13–25	Slovenia
	Gamesheet

NSA Vassil Levski, Sofia
Attendance: 600
Referee: (Serbia) Dejan Stiglic

11 May 2019
14:00 CEST (UTC+02)

Serbia	35-27	Slovenia
	Gamesheet

Stadion Borca, Starčevo
Attendance: 400
Referee: (Israel) Ariel Cabral

18 May 2019
15:00 CEST (UTC+02)

(1 TBP) Slovenia	91-5	Slovakia
	Gamesheet

Rugby stadion OVAL, Ljubljana
Attendance: 300
Referee: (Czech Republic) Matej Razga

== Guinness world record ==
Slovenia had the most siblings competing in a Rugby Union international when Archie, Jack, Frank, George and Max Skofic played for Slovenia against Bulgaria in the European Nations Cup Division Two match at Park Siska, Ljubljana, Slovenia on 12 April 2014.

Yet another record has been set in a test match against Austria when father and son played at the same time. Igor Okič (prop) joined Gal Okič (wing) from the bench as Slovenia scored a late game try to steal the game.

== See also ==
- Rugby union in Slovenia

== Links of Important Slovenian Clubs ==
- RAK Olimpija
- RK Ljubljana
- Rugby Maribor
- RUGBY SLOVENIA

== RZS related links ==
- official website
- Slovenian "Get into rugby portal
