= Odense Athletics Stadium =

Multi-use stadium in Odense, Denmark

Coordinates: 55°23′56″N 10°21′04″E

Odense Atletikstadion
- Interactive map of Odense Atletikstadion
- Location: Odense, Denmark
- Capacity: 8,000

Construction
- Opened: 1941
- Renovated: 1996

Tenant
- FC Fyn

Odense Atletikstadion is a multi-use stadium in Odense, Denmark. It is used mostly for athletics and even some football matches and served as the home stadium of FC Fyn. The stadium holds 8,000 people.

== History ==
The stadium was a notable motorcycle speedway venue from 1950 to 1974. It hosted rounds of the Speedway World Team Cup in 1960, 1961 and 1965. The meetings were organised by the Fyens Motor Sport and the Sports Motor Club Odin and the track record around the 400 metres track was held by Ove Fundin, a legendary rider within the speedway world.
