= Bosnia and Herzegovina national rugby union team =

National rugby union team

Bosnia and Herzegovina
- Union: Rugby Union of Bosnia and Herzegovina
- Head coach: Damir Uzunovic
- Captain: Armin Vehabović
First colours

World Rugby ranking
- Current: 94 (as of 6 October 2025)
- Highest: 73 (29 July 2019)
- Lowest: 102 (2024)

First international
- Bosnia and Herzegovina 3–47 Croatia (28 November 1992)

Biggest win
- Bosnia and Herzegovina 77–10 Kosovo (Zenica, Bosnia and Herzegovina; 5 April 2025)

Biggest defeat
- Slovenia 77–5 Bosnia and Herzegovina (19 May 2007)

The Bosnia and Herzegovina national rugby union team has yet to make its debut at the Rugby World Cup. Bosnia and Herzegovina have been playing international rugby since the early 1990s.

== History ==
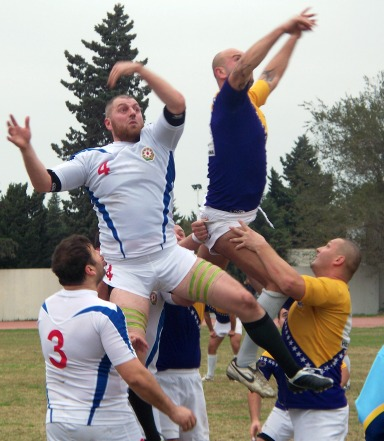
Bosnia and Herzegovina and Azerbaijan awaiting the ball in a line-out in 2009

Bosnia and Herzegovina made their international debut in November 1992 in a match against Croatia, losing 3 points to 47. They also played numerous matches during the late 1990s, including fixtures against Croatia, Luxembourg, Slovenia and Hungary before winning their first international in 2000 against Hungary, winning by one point 13-12.

Bosnia and Herzegovina participated in qualifying for the 2003 Rugby World Cup in Australia, competing in Pool B of Round 1 during 2000-01. They finished fifth in their group (winning two games). They also participated in qualifying tournaments for the 2007 Rugby World Cup in France.

== Current squad ==
Squad to 2015 Rugby World Cup – Europe qualification.

Forwards: Semir Ajanović; Haris Valjevac; Mirsad Fetić; Armin Kavazović; Edin Pojskić; Danijel Keserović; Damir Jovanović; Haris Oruč	Backs: Armin Zadić; Armin Vehabović (C); Fadil Spahić; Sejad Kadić; Adi Milak; Selmir Glavaš; Sabahudin Subašić	Reserves: Nedžad Garanović; Vedran Izić; Adis Topalović; Nejro Ahmić; Senad Turčinović; Sedad Tufekčić; Adnan Hamzić; Zijad Ajkunić

== Record ==
Below is a table of the representative rugby matches played by a Bosnia and Herzegovina national XV at test level up until 18 April 2026, updated after match with Kosovo.

Opponent	Played	Won	Lost	Drawn	% Won
Andorra	4	2	2	0	50%
Austria	8	0	8	0	0%
Azerbaijan	6	5	1	0	83.33%
Bulgaria	7	3	4	0	42.86%
Croatia	5	0	5	0	0%
Cyprus	3	0	3	0	0%
Finland	6	3	2	1	50%
Greece	2	0	2	0	0%
Hungary	6	1	5	0	16.67%
Israel	6	2	4	0	33.33%
Kosovo	2	2	0	0	100%
Lithuania	2	0	2	0	0%
Luxembourg	10	3	7	0	30%
Malta	3	0	3	0	0%
Monaco	3	2	1	0	66.67%
Montenegro	4	4	0	0	100%
Norway	5	3	2	0	60%
Serbia	3	1	2	0	33.33%
Serbia and Montenegro	2	1	0	1	50%
Slovakia	3	3	0	0	100%
Slovenia	6	2	4	0	33.33%
Switzerland	1	0	1	0	0%
Turkey	5	4	0	1	80%
Yugoslavia	1	1	0	0	100%
Total	104	42	58	3	40.38%

== See also ==
- Rugby Union of Bosnia and Herzegovina
- Rugby union in Bosnia and Herzegovina
- Bosnia and Herzegovina national rugby sevens team
- 2003 Rugby World Cup - European qualification
- 2007 Rugby World Cup - Europe qualification
