= History of rugby union matches between Denmark and Sweden =

Sweden Rugby Union badge

Denmark and Sweden have played each other at rugby union since 1949. A total of 53 matches have been played, with Sweden having won 40 times, Denmark having won 10 times and 3 matches having been drawn.

Denmark have played Sweden mostly in one-off annual non-tournament friendly matches, however more recently there have been significant meetings in international tournaments run by FIRA / Rugby Europe as well as Rugby World Cup qualification matches and the now-defunct Nordic Cup regional tournament.

== Overall Summary ==
Venue	Played	Won by Denmark	Won by Sweden	Drawn	Denmark points	Sweden points
Denmark	23	7	14	2	212	326
Sweden	27	2	24	1	193	535
Neutral venue	4	1	3	0	52	85
Overall	54	10	41	3	457	946

== Records ==
Note: Date shown in brackets indicates when the record was or last set.

Record	Denmark	Sweden
Longest winning streak	6 (27 September 1992 - 27 October 2001)	9 (21 September 1974 - 4 April 1985)
Largest points for
Home	33 (27 October 2001)	55 (9 April 2011)
Away	21 (24 April 1991)	37 (4 April 2010)
Largest winning margin
Home	13 (27 May 1995)	40 (9 April 2011)
Away	8 (24 September 2017	29 (15 November 1981)
Neutral	21 (26 September 1993)	39 (20 April 1989)
Largest aggregate score
70 (Sweden 55-15 Denmark) (9 April 2011)

== Results ==
No.	Date	Venue	Score	Winner	Competition
1	3 October 1949	(Sweden) Stockholm	6 - 0	Sweden	Friendly
2	19 November 1950	(Denmark) Copenhagen	0 - 14	Sweden	Friendly
3	6 October 1951	(Sweden) Stockholm	30 - 3	Sweden	Friendly
4	17 March 1953	(Sweden) Gothenburg	16 - 6	Sweden	Friendly
5	2 October 1954	(Denmark) Copenhagen	6 - 9	Sweden	Friendly
6	26 September 1958	(Sweden) Norrköping	5 - 5	Draw	Friendly
7	4 October 1959	(Denmark) Copenhagen	6 - 8	Sweden	Friendly
8	2 October 1960	(Sweden) Stockholm	11 - 3	Sweden	Friendly
9	15 October 1961	(Denmark) Odense	12 - 12	Draw	Friendly
10	7 October 1962	(Sweden) Malmö	9 - 8	Sweden	Friendly
11	13 October 1963	(Denmark) Copenhagen	6 - 0	Denmark	Friendly
12	13 August 1964	(Sweden) Malmö	14 - 3	Sweden	Friendly
13	13 June 1965	(Denmark) Aalborg	3 - 6	Sweden	Friendly
14	25 September 1966	(Sweden) Gothenburg	18 - 0	Sweden	Friendly
15	1 October 1967	(Denmark) Copenhagen	6 - 9	Sweden	Friendly
16	27 October 1968	(Sweden) Helsingborg	11 - 0	Sweden	Friendly
17	19 October 1969	(Denmark) Copenhagen	9 - 9	Draw	Friendly
18	27 September 1970	(Sweden) Vänersborg	8 - 0	Sweden	Friendly
19	23 May 1971	(Denmark) Køge	5 - 18	Sweden	Friendly
20	13 August 1971	(Sweden) Gothenburg	11 - 3	Sweden	Gothenburg Trophy

No.	Date	Venue	Score	Winner	Competition
21	29 October 1972	(Sweden) Västerås	26 - 12	Sweden	Friendly
22	27 October 1973	(Denmark) Aalborg	12 - 7	Denmark	Friendly
23	21 September 1974	(Sweden) Enköping	24 - 0	Sweden	Friendly
24	17 May 1975	(Denmark) Copenhagen	9 - 20	Sweden	Friendly
25	18 May 1976	(Sweden) Karlstad	3 - 0	Sweden	Friendly
26	3 September 1977	(Denmark) Odense	3 - 26	Sweden	Friendly
27	20 May 1978	(Sweden) Malmö	40 - 3	Sweden	Friendly
28	13 September 1980	(Denmark) Aarhus	4 - 20	Sweden	1980-81 FIRA Trophy Third Division
29	15 November 1981	(Denmark) Copenhagen	6 - 35	Sweden	1981-82 FIRA Trophy Third Division
30	16 October 1982	(Sweden) Lund	25 - 0	Sweden	Friendly
31	04 April 1985	(Sweden) Malmö	16 - 0	Sweden	Friendly
32	4 October 1986	(Denmark) Aalborg	12 - 11	Denmark	Friendly
33	11 October 1987	(Sweden) Eskilstuna	27 - 6	Sweden	1987 Nordic Cup
34	19 October 1988	(Denmark) Aalborg	10 - 21	Sweden	1988 Nordic Cup
35	20 April 1989	(France) Tours	39 - 0	Sweden	1991 Rugby World Cup Qualifying
36	1 October 1989	(Norway) Oslo	12 - 9	Sweden	1989 Nordic Cup
37	26 May 1990	(Denmark) Copenhagen	0 - 3	Sweden	Friendly
38	30 September 1990	(Finland) Toijala	29 - 17	Sweden	1990 Nordic Cup
39	24 April 1991	(Sweden) Malmö	23 - 21	Sweden	1990-92 Fira Trophy Third Division Pool 2
40	28 September 1991	(Sweden) Karlstad	30 - 9	Sweden	1990-92 Fira Trophy Third Division Pool 2; 1991 Nordic Cup

No.	Date	Venue	Score	Winner	Competition
41	27 September 1992	(Denmark) Aalborg	13 - 5	Denmark	1992 Nordic Cup
42	4 April 1993	(Sweden) Trelleborg	13 - 15	Denmark	Friendly
43	26 September 1993	(Norway) Stavanger	26 - 5	Denmark	1993 Nordic Cup
44	27 May 1995	(Denmark) Copenhagen	16 - 3	Denmark	1995 Baltic Cup
45	31 October 1998	(Denmark) Copenhagen	19 - 9	Denmark	1998-99 FIRA Tournament Division 3 Pool 3
46	27 October 2001	(Denmark) Copenhagen	33 - 21	Denmark	2003 Rugby World Cup Qualifying
47	5 November 2005	(Sweden) Helsingborg	16 - 14	Sweden	2004-06 European Nations Cup Third Division Pool A
48	28 October 2006	(Denmark) Odense	13 - 23	Sweden	2006-08 European Nations Cup Division 3A
49	3 November 2007	(Sweden) Helsingborg	8 - 6	Sweden	2006-08 European Nations Cup Division 3A
50	4 April 2010	(Denmark)	15 - 37	Sweden	Friendly
51	9 April 2011	(Sweden) Stockholm	55 - 15	Sweden	2011 Viking Tri Nations
52	24 September 2017	(Sweden) Malmö	10 - 18	Denmark	Friendly
53	16 March 2025	(Sweden) Häljarp	47 - 11	Sweden	Friendly
54	4 April 2026	(Sweden) Trelleborg	33 - 32	Sweden	2025-26 Rugby Europe Trophy
55	TBA	TBA - likely (Denmark)			2026-27 Rugby Europe Trophy
