= 2024–25 Rugby Europe Trophy =

European national rugby tournament

- Date: 26 October 2024 - 12 April 2025
- Countries: Croatia; Czech Republic; Lithuania; Luxembourg; Poland; Sweden

Tournament statistics
- Champions: Poland (2nd title)
- Matches played: 15
- Attendance: 9,750 (650 per match)
- Tries scored: 116 (7.73 per match)

The 2024–25 Rugby Europe Trophy is the seventh season of the second premier rugby union competition for European national teams outside the Six Nations Championship which itself is a part of the Rugby Europe International Championships. The confirmed teams that are competing include Czechia, Croatia, Lithuania, Luxembourg, Poland and Sweden.

== Participants ==
Nation	Stadium			Head coach	Captain
Nation	Home stadium	Capacity	Location	Head coach	Captain
Croatia	Stadion Lučko	1,500	Zagreb	(New Zealand) Anthony Posa	Nik Jurišić
Czech Republic	Markéta Stadium	10,000	Prague	(Czech Republic) Miroslav Němeček	Dan Hošek
Lithuania	Šiauliai Rugby Academy Stadium; Aukštaitija Stadium	4,000; 6,600	Šiauliai; Panevėžys	(Lithuania) Gediminas Marcišauskas	Tautvydas Krasauskas
Luxembourg	Stade de Luxembourg	9,471	Luxembourg	(Luxembourg) Alexandre Benedetti	Christian Olsen
Poland	Narodowy Stadion Rugby	2,425	Gdynia	(Wales) Christian Hitt	Piotr Zeszutek
Sweden	Trelleborg Rugby Arena	2,000	Trelleborg	(England) Alex Laybourne	Axel Kalling-Smith

== Table ==
Champions
Relegated to Rugby Europe Conference

Pos	Team	Pld	W	D	L	PF	PA	PD	TF	TA	TB	LB	Pts
1	Poland	5	5	0	0	182	90	+92	23	14	2	0	22
2	Sweden	5	4	0	1	192	113	+79	26	16	2	1	19
3	Czech Republic	5	3	0	2	164	89	+75	20	9	2	2	16
4	Croatia	5	1	1	3	147	203	−56	22	27	0	0	6
5	Lithuania	5	1	0	4	105	182	−77	13	25	1	0	5
6	Luxembourg	5	0	1	4	95	208	−113	11	26	0	0	2

Source: Rugby Europe
Rules for classification:
If two teams have the same number of points the best ranked will be: 1) match points in the games played between the tied Unions; 2) tries in the games played between the tied Unions; 3) match points difference in all pool games; 4) tries difference for in all pool games; 5) match points for in all pool games.
If three or more teams have same number of points, the best ranked will be: 1) match points difference in all pool games; 2) tries for in all pool games; 4) match points for in all pool games.
Points were awarded to the teams as follows: Win – 4 points, Draw – 2 points, At least 3 more tries than opponent – 1 point, Loss within 7 points – 1 point

== Fixtures ==
26 October 2024
14:00 EEST (UTC+2)

(1 TBP) Lithuania	47–20	Luxembourg
	Repjrt

Siauliai Rugby Academy Stadium, Šiauliai
Attendance: n/a
Referee: Adrian Pawlik (Poland)

26 October 2024
14:00 CEST (UTC+2)

Sweden	22–16	Czech Republic (1 LBP)
	Report

Trelleborg Rugby Arena, Trelleborg
Attendance: 600
Referee: Andrei Gheorghe (Romania)

2 November 2024
14:00 EET (UTC+2)

Lithuania	19–46	Sweden (1 TBP)
	Report

Aukštaitija Stadium, Panevėžys
Attendance: 300
Referee: Francisco Serra (Portugal)

9 November 2024
14:00 CET (UTC +1)

Czech Republic	49–26	Croatia
	Report

Markéta Stadium, Prague
Attendance: 500
Referee: Adele Robert (Belgium)

16 November 2024
14:00 CET (UTC +1)

Croatia	31–42	Sweden
	Report

Stadion Lučko, Zagreb
Attendance: 300
Referee: Maria Latos (Germany)

16 November 2024
16:00 CET (UTC +1)

(1 TBP) Poland	40–13	Lithuania
	Report

Narodowy Stadion Rugby, Gdynia
Attendance: 1,500
Referee: Edwin Van Der Spek (Netherlands)

23 November 2024
14:00 CET (UTC +1)

Croatia	32–23	Lithuania
	Report

Stadion Lučko, Zagreb
Attendance: 200
Referee: Eugeniu Procopi (Moldova)

23 November 2024
20:15 CET (UTC +1)

(1 LBP) Czech Republic	15–22	Poland
	Report

Markéta Stadium, Prague
Attendance: 200
Referee: Papuna Chiqaberidze (Georgia)

30 November 2024
18:00 CET (UTC+1)

Luxembourg	31–31	Croatia
	Report

Stade de Luxembourg, Luxembourg
Attendance: 1,000
Referee: Phila Bitterhout (Netherlands)

22 February 2025
16:00 CET (UTC +1)

(1 TBP) Poland	58–27	Croatia
	Report

Narodowy Stadion Rugby, Gdynia
Attendance: 1,500
Referee: Inigo Atorrasagasti (Spain)

8 March 2025
14:00 CET (UTC +1)

(1 TBP) Czech Republic	40–16	Luxembourg
	Report

Markéta Stadium, Prague
Attendance: 300
Referee: Diogo Miranda (Portugal)

29 March 2025
14:00 EET (UTC+2)

Lithuania	3–44	Czech Republic (1 TBP)
	Report

Siauliai Rugby Academy Stadium, Šiauliai
Attendance: 500
Referee: Ethan Glass (Switzerland)

29 March 2025
18:00 CET (UTC+1)

Luxembourg	18–57	Sweden (1 TBP)
	Report

Stade de Luxembourg, Luxembourg
Attendance: 1,100
Referee: Saba Makharadze (Georgia)

5 April 2025
18:00 CEST (UTC+1)

Luxembourg	10–33	Poland
	Report

Stade de Luxembourg, Luxembourg
Attendance: 900
Referee: Eki Fanlo (Spain)

12 April 2025
15:00 CEST (UTC+1)

(1 LBP) Sweden	25–29	Poland
	Report

Trelleborg Rugby Arena, Trelleborg
Attendance: 850
Referee: Nicolae Fratila (Romania)

== See also ==
- Rugby Europe International Championships
- Six Nations Championship
