= 2026–27 Rugby Europe Trophy =

European national rugby tournament

- Date: 31 October 2026 – 2 April 2027
- Countries: Czech Republic; Denmark; Germany; Lithuania; Malta; Sweden

Tournament statistics
- Matches played: 9
- Attendance: 5,800 (644 per match)
- Tries scored: 88 (9.78 per match)

The 2026–27 Rugby Europe Trophy is the ninth season of the second premier rugby union competition for European national teams outside the Six Nations Championship; itself a part of the Rugby Europe International Championships. The confirmed teams that are competing include Czechia, Denmark, Germany, Lithuania, Malta and Sweden.

== Tournament format ==
=== Schedule ===
The six teams play each other once home or away in two windows: the first being during the World Rugby Autumn International window of 31st October - 14th November 2026; the latter being around Easter 2027.

==== Scoring ====
Teams receive 4 points for a win, 2 for a draw and 0 for a loss. A bonus point is awarded for teams who score three more tries than their opponents, and a losing bonus point isawarded to the losing team that have a score within 7 points of the winning side. Additional factors such as points difference and discipline is used to split ties.

== Broadcasting ==
Games will be streamed on Rugby Europe TV via either YouTube or DailyMotion.

== Participants ==
| Nation | Stadium | | | Head coach | Captain |
| Nation | Home Stadium / Stadia | Capacity | Location(s) | Head coach | Captain |
|---|---|---|---|---|---|
| Czech Republic | Markéta Stadium | 10,000 | Prague | (France) David Courteix | Jakub Havel |
| Denmark | Erritsø Rugbystadion | N/A | Fredericia | (Denmark) Andreas Robertson | Mikkel Andresen |
| Germany | Rugby-Park Köln; Fritz-Grunebaum-Sportpark | 1,500; 5,000 | Cologne; Heidelberg | (Germany) Michael Poppmeier | Hassan Rayan |
| Lithuania | Rugby Stadium Gardino | 4,000 | Šiauliai | (Lithuania) Gediminas Marcišauskas | Tautvydas Krasauskas |
| Malta | Tony Bezzina Stadium | 3,038 | Paola | (Malta) Martin Barbara | Joseph Greaves |
| Sweden | Trelleborg Rugby Arena | 2,000 | Trelleborg | (England) Alex Laybourne | Axel Kalling-Smith |

== Table ==
Champions and advances to Promotion/relegation play-off
Relegated to Rugby Europe Conference

| Pos | Team | Pld | W | D | L | PF | PA | PD | TF | TA | TB | LB | Pts |
|---|---|---|---|---|---|---|---|---|---|---|---|---|---|
| 1 | Czech Republic | 3 | 3 | 0 | 0 | 114 | 72 | +42 | 18 | 10 | 2 | 0 | 14 |
| 2 | Malta | 3 | 3 | 0 | 0 | 109 | 82 | +27 | 14 | 13 | 0 | 0 | 12 |
| 3 | Germany | 3 | 2 | 0 | 1 | 151 | 63 | +88 | 22 | 8 | 2 | 1 | 11 |
| 4 | Sweden | 3 | 1 | 0 | 2 | 122 | 89 | +33 | 20 | 13 | 1 | 2 | 7 |
| 5 | Denmark | 3 | 0 | 0 | 3 | 60 | 154 | −94 | 10 | 23 | 0 | 0 | 0 |
| 6 | Lithuania | 3 | 0 | 0 | 3 | 49 | 145 | −96 | 6 | 23 | 0 | 0 | 0 |

Updated to match(es) played on 14 November 2026. Source: Rugby Europe
Rules for classification:
If two teams have the same number of points the best ranked will be: 1) match points in the games played between the tied Unions; 2) tries in the games played between the tied Unions; 3) match points difference in all pool games; 4) tries difference for in all pool games; 5) match points for in all pool games.
If three or more teams have same number of points, the best ranked will be: 1) match points difference in all pool games; 2) tries for in all pool games; 4) match points for in all pool games.
Points were awarded to the teams as follows: Win – 4 points, Draw – 2 points, At least 3 more tries than opponent – 1 point, Loss within 7 points – 1 point

== Fixtures ==
31 October 2026
13:00 CET (UTC+1)

Denmark
Try: Madum (2) 12' m, 15' c
Kilsdal 36' m
Con: Wiggins (1/3)
Pen: Wiggins (0/1)
17–36
Report
Malta
Try: Connolly 40' c

Dudman 42' c, 44' c
Sultana 52' m

Eden 79' m
Con: Dudman (4/5)
Pen: Connolly (0/1)
Dudman (1/1)

Erritsø Rugby Stadium, Fredericia
Attendance: 500
Referee: (Germany) Paul Warman

Team details

| LP | 1 | Marcus Borup | | (substituted off) 54' |
| HK | 2 | Finn Graham | (yellow card) 58' to 68' | (substituted off) 68' |
| TP | 3 | Rasmus Brofeldt | | (substituted off) 60' |
| LL | 4 | Jeppe Holm |
| RL | 5 | Will Sorensen | | (substituted off) 54' |
| BF | 6 | Adam van Geyzel |
| OF | 7 | Erwan Caquineau | | (substituted off) 70' |
| N8 | 8 | Mikkel Andresen (c) |
| SH | 9 | Christian Kilsdal |
| FH | 10 | Benjamin Wiggins |
| LW | 11 | João Dias de Oliveria De Sousa Cardoso | | (substituted off) 54' |
| IC | 12 | Cassius Deschamps |
| OC | 13 | Rasmus Madum | | (substituted off) 68' |
| RW | 14 | Lukas Maidens | | (substituted off) 70' |
| FB | 15 | Mads Jorgensen | | (substituted off) 58' | (substituted on) 68' |
Replacements:
| HK | 16 | Facundo Bellone | | (substituted on) 58' | (substituted off) 68' | (substituted on) 68' |
| LK | 17 | Tobias Christensen | | (substituted on) 54' |
| PR | 18 | Marco Castilletti | | (substituted on) 60' |
| LK | 19 | Nils Hagen | | (substituted on) 54' |
| FL | 20 | Marcus Reid | | (substituted on) 70' |
| SH | 21 | Franco Mazza | | (substituted on) 54' |
| FH | 22 | Laust Olsen | | (substituted on) 70' |
| WG | 23 | Alvin Halbech | | (substituted on) 68' |
Coach:
Andreas Robertson

| LP | 1 | Rhodri Apsee) | | (substituted off) 40' |
| HK | 2 | Ryan Connolly | | (substituted off) 76' |
| TP | 3 | Terence Galdes | | (substituted off) 40' |
| LL | 4 | Luke Watts | | (substituted off) 40' |
| RL | 5 | Mark Davey | | (substituted off) 60' |
| BF | 6 | Cameron Sultana | (yellow card) 80' to 80' |
| OF | 7 | Joseph Walker | | (substituted off) 80' |
| N8 | 8 | Joseph Greaves |
| SH | 9 | Thomas Holloway |
| FH | 10 | Robert Holloway | (yellow card) 24' to 34' |
| LW | 11 | Adam Kelly | | (substituted off) 60' |
| IC | 12 | Christopher Dudman |
| OC | 13 | Brendan Dalton |
| RW | 14 | Zarrin Galea | | (substituted off) 66' |
| FB | 15 | John Connolly |
Replacements:
| PR | 16 | Caleb Bonello | | (substituted on) 76' |
| HK | 17 | Alexander Hignett | | (substituted on) 40' |
| PR | 18 | Samuel Eden | | (substituted on) 40' |
| N8 | 19 | Blake Scott | | (substituted on) 60' |
| FL | 20 | George Strickland | | (substituted on) 40' |
| SH | 21 | Dylan McDonald | | (substituted on) 80' |
| CE | 22 | Jethro Zammit Randich | | (substituted on) 60' |
| WG | 23 | Rory Brien | | (substituted on) 66' |
Coach:
Phil Pretorius

Touch judges:
Nathanael Legras (Belgium)
Juanma Escudero (Spain)

31 October 2026
14:00 EET (UTC+2)

| Lithuania | 7–54 | Germany (1 TBP) |
| | Report |

Rugby Stadium Gardino, Šiauliai
Attendance: 400
Referee: (Monaco) Wissam Baamara

31 October 2026
14:00 CET (UTC+1)

| (1 LBP) Sweden | 28–31 | Czech Republic |
| | Report |

Trelleborg Rugby Arena, Trelleborg
Attendance: 400
Referee: (Denmark) Emmanuel Jasques

7 November 2026
13:00 CET (UTC+1)

| Denmark | 24–52 | Czech Republic (1 TBP) |
| | Report |

Erritsø Rugby Stadium, Fredericia
Attendance: n/a
Referee: (Romania) Nicolae Fratila

7 November 2026
14:00 EET (UTC+2)

| Lithuania | 22–60 | Sweden (1 TBP) |
| | Report |

Rugby Stadium Gardino, Siauliai
Attendance: 350
Referee: (Poland) Lech Mieszko

7 November 2026
14:30 CEST (UTC+2)

| Malta | 37–31 | Germany (1 LBP) |
| | Report |

Tony Bezzina Stadium, Paola
Attendance: n/a
Referee: (Croatia) Luka Lerotic

14 November 2026
13:30 CET (UTC+1)

| (1 TBP) Germany | 66–19 | Denmark |
| | Report |

Rugby-Park Köln, Cologne
Attendance: 2,350
Referee: (Netherlands) Katherine Ritchie

14 November 2026
14:00 CEST (UTC+2)

| Malta | 37–34 | Sweden (1 LBP) |
| | Report |

Tony Bezzina Stadium, Paola
Attendance: 1,600
Referee: (Switzerland) Ethan Glass

14 November 2026
20:40 CET (UTC+1)

| (1 TBP) Czech Republic | 31–20 | Lithuania |
| | Report |

Marketa Stadium, Prague
Attendance: 200
Referee: (Spain) Alberto Diaz

27 February 2027

| Malta | v | Czech Republic |

Tony Bezzina Stadium, Paola

6 March 2027
13:00 CET (UTC+1)

| Czech Republic | v | Germany |

Marketa Stadium, Prague

27 March 2027

| Germany | v | Sweden |

Fritz-Grunebaum-Sportpark, Heidelberg

27 March 2027
14:00 CET (UTC+1)

| Denmark | v | Lithuania |

TBC

2 April 2027

| Sweden | v | Denmark |

TBC

2 April 2027

| Lithuania | v | Malta |

TBC

== Relegation/promotion play-off ==
| v |

== See also ==
- Rugby Europe International Championships
- Six Nations Championship
