= 2021–22 Rugby Europe International Championships =

Rugby union championship

- Date: 2 October 2021 – 21 May 2022
- Countries: 34

Tournament statistics
- Champions: Championship; Georgia (14); Trophy; Belgium (3); Conference 1 Sweden (3); Croatia (1); Conference 2 Moldova (1); Bulgaria (1); Development
- Antim Cup: Georgia (15th title)
- Matches played: 57
- Attendance: 92,517 (1,623 per match)
- Tries scored: 298 (5.23 per match)

The 2021–22 Rugby Europe International Championships is the European Championship for tier 2 and tier 3 rugby union nations. The 2021–22 season is the fifth of its new format and structure, where all Levels play on a one-year cycle, replacing the old format of a two-year cycle, with the teams playing each other both home and away.

For all teams competing in the Championship, this year's edition of the Rugby Europe International Championships doubles as the second year of 2023 Rugby World Cup qualifiers for the European region, where the winner and runner-up teams of the two-year cycle, automatically qualifies to the tournament as Europe 1 and Europe 2. The third team qualifies to the Final qualification tournament.

On February 28, 2022 Russia and Belarus were suspended from all international rugby and cross-border club rugby activities until further notice.

== Countries ==
Pre-tournament World Rugby rankings in parentheses.

Championship

- Georgia * (12)
- Netherlands (26)
- Portugal (20)
- Romania (15)
- Russia X (25)
- Spain (19)

Conference 1
North

- Czech Republic (37)
- Hungary (64)
- Latvia (63)
- Luxembourg (56)
- Sweden (53)

Conference 2
North

- Denmark (71)
- Finland (86)
- Moldova (59)
- Norway (95)

Development

- Estonia
- Montenegro
- Slovakia

Trophy

- Belgium ↓ (27)
- Germany (30)
- Lithuania (44)
- Poland (34)
- Switzerland (28)
- Ukraine (36)

South

- Croatia (45)
- Cyprus (NR)
- Israel (60)
- Malta (38)
- Slovenia (70)

South

- Andorra (72)
- Bosnia and Herzegovina (82)
- Bulgaria (73)
- Serbia (88)
- Turkey (NR)

Legend:
* Champion of 2020–21 season; ↓ Relegated from higher division during 2019–20 season; X Disqualified

== 2022 Rugby Europe Championship ==
Champions
Disqualified

Pos.	Team	Games				Points			Tries			TBP	LBP	GS	Table points
Pos.	Team	Played	Won	Drawn	Lost	For	Against	Diff	For	Against	Diff	TBP	LBP	GS	Table points
1	Georgia	5	4	1	0	172	73	+99	25	8	+17	2	0	0	20^{[a]}
2	Romania	5	3	0	2	153	128	+25	19	18	+1	1	1	0	14
3	Spain	5	4	0	1	170	135	+35	23	16	+7	1	0	0	12*
4	Portugal	5	2	1	2	139	98	+41	19	11	+8	1	1	0	12^{[a]}
5	Netherlands	5	1	0	4	25	212	-187	3	34	-31	0	0	0	4^{[a]}
6	Russia	5	0	0	5	62	75	-13	7	9	-2	0	1	0	1
Source - Points were awarded to the teams as follows: Win – 4 points | Draw – 2 points | At least 3 more tries than opponent – 1 point | Loss within 7 points – 1 point | Completing a Grand Slam – 1 point^{a} Georgia, Portugal and Netherlands awarded 4 points for cancelled games against Russia * deducted points

Matches

5 February 2022
14:30 EET (UTC+2)

Romania	34–25	Russia
	Report

Arcul de Triumf Stadium, Bucharest
Attendance: 0
Referee: Adam Leal (England)

5 February 2022
16:00 CET (UTC+1)

(1 TBP) Spain	43–0	Netherlands
	Report

Estadio Nacional Complutense, Madrid
Attendance: 2,000
Referee: Gianluca Gnecchi (Italy)

6 February 2022
15:00 GET (UTC+4)

Georgia	25–25	Portugal
	Report

Mikheil Meskhi Stadium, Tbilisi
Attendance: 7,000
Referee: Romain Poite (France)

12 February 2022
13:00 MSK (UTC+3)

(1 LBP) Russia	37–41	Spain
	Report

Slava Metreveli Central Stadium, Sochi
Attendance: 0
Referee: Andrea Piardi (Italy)

12 February 2022
13:15 CET (UTC+1)

Netherlands	10–72	Georgia (1 TBP)
	Report

NRCA Stadium, Amsterdam
Attendance: 900
Referee: Ludovic Cayre (France)

12 February 2022
17:30 EET (UTC+2)

Romania	37–27	Portugal
	Report

Arcul de Triumf Stadium, Bucharest
Attendance: 2,700
Referee: Frank Murphy (Ireland)

26 February 2022
14:00 GMT (UTC±0)

(1 TBP) Portugal	59–3	Netherlands
	Report

Campo de Rugby Complexo Desportivo, Caldas da Rainha
Attendance: 2,500
Referee: Federico Vedovelli (Italy)

27 February 2022
12:45 CET (UTC+1)

Spain	38–21	Romania
	Report

Estadio Nacional Complutense, Madrid
Attendance: 5,000
Referee: Sam Grove-White (Scotland)

n/a
n/a

Georgia	Cancelled (Note: Georgia awarded 4 points)	Russia

n/a
Attendance: n/a
Referee: n/a

n/a
n/a

Russia	Cancelled (Note: Netherlands awarded 4 points)	Netherlands

n/a
Attendance: n/a
Referee: n/a

12 March 2022
17:30 EET (UTC+2)

(1 LBP) Romania	23–26	Georgia
	Report

Arcul de Triumf Stadium, Bucharest
Attendance: 6,000
Referee: Ben Breakspear (Wales)

13 March 2022
12:45 CET (UTC+1)

Spain	33–28	Portugal (1 LBP)
	Report

Estadio Nacional Complutense, Madrid
Attendance: 6,000
Referee: Tual Trainini (France)

19 March 2022
13:00 CET (UTC+1)

Netherlands	12–38	Romania (1 TBP)
	Report

NRCA Stadium, Amsterdam
Attendance: 1,200
Referee: Ben Blain (Scotland)

n/a
n/a

Portugal	Cancelled (Note: Portugal awarded 4 points)	Russia

n/a
Attendance: n/a
Referee: n/a

20 March 2022
18:00 GET (UTC+4)

(1 TBP) Georgia	49–15	Spain
	Report

Boris Paichadze Dinamo Arena, Tbilisi
Attendance: 11,000
Referee: Craig Evans (Wales)

== 2021–22 Rugby Europe Trophy ==
Champions and promoted to Championship
Promoted to Championship

Place	Nation	Games				Points			Tries			TBP	LBP	Table points
Place	Nation	Played	Won	Drawn	Lost	For	Against	Diff	For	Against	Diff	TBP	LBP	Table points
1	Belgium	5	4	0	1	149	76	+73	21	5	+16	4	1	21
2	Poland	5	4	0	1	139	116	+23	15	15	0	1	0	17
3	Germany	5	3	0	2	150	95	+55	16	9	+7	3	2	17
4	Switzerland	5	2	0	3	120	117	+3	9	14	−5	1	0	9
5	Ukraine	5	1	0	4	63	148	−85	9	13	−4	0	1	5
6	Lithuania	5	1	0	4	108	177	−69	12	26	−14	0	1	5
Source - Points were awarded to the teams as follows: Win – 4 points | Draw – 2 points | At least 3 more tries than opponent – 1 point | Loss within 7 points – 1 point | Completing a Grand Slam – 1 point

Matches

9 October 2021
12:50 EEST (UTC +3)

(1 LBP) Ukraine	24–27	Poland
	Report

Yunist Stadion, Lviv
Attendance: 2,000
Referee: John Catteau (Belgium)

23 October 2021
13:50 EEST (UTC+03)

(1 LBP) Lithuania	37–39	Ukraine
	Report

Šiauliai Rugby Academy Stadium, Šiauliai
Attendance: 500
Referee: Ethan Glass (Switzerland)

30 October 2021
13:50 EEST (UTC+03)

Lithuania	16–46	Germany (1 TBP)
	Report

Šiauliai Rugby Academy Stadium, Šiauliai
Attendance: 450
Referee: Gert Visser (Netherlands)

13 November 2021
14:55 CET (UTC+01)

Poland	21–16	Germany (1 LBP)
	Report

Narodowy Stadion Rugby, Gdynia
Attendance: 2,500
Referee: Saba Abulashvili (Georgia)

13 November 2021
15:20 CET (UTC+01)

Switzerland	20–28	Lithuania
	Report

Centre Sportif de Colovray, Nyon
Attendance: 1,140
Referee: Dan O'Connell (Germany)

20 November 2021
14:20 CET (UTC+01)

Poland	37–25	Switzerland
	Report

Stadion Polonii, Warsaw
Attendance: N/A
Referee: Eki Fanlo (Spain)

12 February 2022
15:00 CET (UTC+01)

(1 TBP) Belgium	28–0	Ukraine
	n/a

n/a
Attendance: n/a
Referee: n/a

19 February 2022
14:50 CET (UTC+01)

(1 LBP) Germany	26–33	Belgium (1 TBP)
	Report

Fritz Grunebaum Sportpark, Heidelberg
Attendance: 1,000
Referee: Shota Tevzadze (Georgia)

12 March 2022
15:20 CET (UTC+01)

Switzerland	22–18	Belgium (1 LBP)
	Report

Stade des Cherpines, Geneva
Attendance: 1,376
Referee: Alexandru Ionescu (Romania)

19 March 2022
13:45 CET (UTC+01)

(1 TBP) Germany	34–25	Switzerland
	Report

Sportzentrum Martinsee, Heusenstamm
Attendance: 800
Referee: Gert Visser (Ireland)

19 March 2022
14:50 CET (UTC+01)

(1 TBP) Belgium	41–11	Poland
	Report

Sportscentrum Nelson Mandela, Brussels
Attendance: 1,850
Referee: Andrew Cole (Netherlands)

26 March 2022
13:50 EST (UTC+03)

Lithuania	17–29	Belgium (1 TBP)
	Report

Šiauliai Rugby Academy Stadium, Šiauliai
Attendance: 300
Referee: Inigo Atorrasagasti (Spain)

9 April 2022
14:35 CEST (UTC+02)

(1 TBP) Poland	43–10	Lithuania
	Report

Narodowy Stadion Rugby, Gdynia
Attendance: 2,000
Referee: Eugeniu Procopi, (Romania)

16 April 2022
15:00 CEST (UTC +2)

Germany	28–0	Ukraine
	n/a

n/a
Attendance: n/a
Referee: n/a

== 2021–22 Rugby Europe Conference ==
=== Conference 1 ===
==== Conference 1 North ====
Champions and promoted to 2022–23 Rugby Europe Trophy

Place	Nation	Games				Points			TBP	LBP	Table points
Place	Nation	Played	Won	Drawn	Lost	For	Against	Diff	TBP	LBP	Table points
1	Sweden	4	4	0	0	154	73	+81	2	0	18
2	Czech Republic	4	3	0	1	142	70	+72	3	0	15
3	Latvia	3	1	0	2	67	109	-42	1	0	5
4	Luxembourg	4	1	0	3	56	128	-72	0	0	4
5	Hungary	3	0	0	3	61	90	-29	0	2	2
Source - Points were awarded to the teams as follows: Win – 4 points | Draw – 2 points | At least 3 more tries than opponent – 1 point | Loss within 7 points – 1 point | Completing a Grand Slam – 1 point

Matches

23 October 2021
14:00 CEST (UTC +2)

(1 TBP) Sweden	51–5	Luxembourg
	Report

Bollspelaren, Norrköping
Attendance: 305
Referee: Artur Kisle (Latvia)

6 November 2021
13:00 CET (UTC+01)

(1 TBP) Czech Republic	31–13	Hungary
	Report

Stadion ragby Císařka, Prague
Attendance: 550
Referee: Eugeniu Procopi (Moldova)

27 November 2021
18:00 CET (UTC+01)

Luxembourg	12–39	Czech Republic (1TBP)
	Report

Stade de Luxembourg, Gasperich
Attendance: 0
Referee: Vaidotas Girdvainis (Lithuania)

12 March 2022
18:00 CET (UTC+01)

Luxembourg	30–23	Hungary (1 LBP)
	Report

Stade de Luxembourg, Gasperich
Attendance: 1,300
Referee: Francisca Serra (Portugal)

2 April 2022
14:00 EEST (UTC+03)

(1 TBP) Latvia	25–9	Luxembourg
	Report

Baldones stadions, Baldone
Attendance: 400
Referee: Hrvoje Bartolic (Croatia)

23 April 2022
15:00 EEST (UTC+03)

Latvia	25–46	Sweden (1 TBP)
	Report

Baldones stadions, Baldone
Attendance: 200
Referee: Mike Hawkins (Denmark)

7 May 2022
14:00 CEST (UTC +2)

(1 LBP) Hungary	25–29	Sweden
	Report

Rugby Center at Kincsem Park, Budapest
Attendance: 800
Referee: Nicolas Vandecauter (Belgium)

7 May 2022
14:00 CEST (UTC +2)

(1 TBP) Czech Republic	54–17	Latvia
	Report

Rugby Club Sparta Praha, Prague
Attendance: 400
Referee: Lukas Kasinski (Poland)

14 May 2022
14:00 CEST (UTC +2)

Sweden	28–18	Czech Republic
	Report

Olympiastadion, Stockholm
Referee: Kilian O'Brien (Germany)

n/a
n/a

Hungary	n/a	Latvia
	n/a

Sportközpont, Százhalombatta
Referee: n/a

==== Conference 1 South ====
Champions and promoted to 2022–23 Rugby Europe Trophy

Place	Nation	Games				Points			TBP	LBP	Table points
Place	Nation	Played	Won	Drawn	Lost	For	Against	Diff	TBP	LBP	Table points
1	Croatia	4	4	0	0	111	33	+78	2	0	18
2	Malta	4	3	0	1	69	40	+29	0	1	13
3	Israel	4	2	0	2	62	54	+8	0	1	9
4	Cyprus	4	1	0	3	58	70	-12	1	1	6
5	Slovenia	4	0	0	4	13	116	-103	0	0	0
Source - Points were awarded to the teams as follows: Win – 4 points | Draw – 2 points | At least 3 more tries than opponent – 1 point | Loss within 7 points – 1 point | Completing a Grand Slam – 1 point

Matches

30 October 2021
14:00 CEST (UTC+02)

Slovenia	10–24	Malta
	Report

Oval Ljubljana, Ljubljana
Attendance: 0
Referee: Norbert Matrai (Hungary)

6 November 2021
14:00 CET (UTC+01)

(1 TBP) Croatia	48–3	Slovenia
	Report

Stari plac, Split
Attendance: 100
Referee: Benjamin Loader (Austria)

13 November 2021
15:00 EET (UTC+02)

Cyprus	8–29	Croatia (1 TBP)
	Report

Stelios Kyriakides Stadium, Paphos
Attendance: 0
Referee: Florin Bonea (Romania)

13 November 2021
13:00 CET (UTC+01)

Malta	15–13	Israel (1 LBP)
	Report

Tony Bezzina stadium, Paola
Attendance: 0
Referee: Pedro Mendes-Silva (Portugal)

26 March 2022
n/a

(1 TBP) Cyprus	28–0	Slovenia
	n/a

n/a
Attendance: n/a
Referee: n/a

2 April 2022
14:00 CEST (UTC+02)

Slovenia	0–16	Israel
	Report

Oval Ljubljana, Ljubljana
Attendance: 225
Referee: Rutger Van Faasen (Netherlands)

2 April 2022
14:15 CEST (UTC+02)

Croatia	7–3	Malta (1 LBP)
	Report

Stadion NŠC Stjepan Spajić, Zagreb
Attendance: 350
Referee: Ethan Glass (Switzerland)

9 April 2022
15:00 IDT (UTC+03)

Israel	19–27	Croatia
	Report

Yizre'el Rugby Club, Yizre'el
Attendance: 300
Referee: Eki Fanlo (Spain)

16 April 2022
14:00 CEST (UTC+02)

Malta	27–10	Cyprus
	Report

Tony Bezzina stadium, Paola
Attendance: 931
Referee: Benjamin Loader (Austria)

30 April 2022
14:00 IST (UTC+02)

Israel	14–12	Cyprus (1 LBP)
	Report

Petah Tikva Municipal Stadium, Petah Tikva
Attendance: 0
Referee: Jeremy Coomans (Belgium)

=== Conference 2 ===
==== Conference 2 North ====
Champions and promoted

Place	Nation	Games				Points			TBP	LBP	Table points
Place	Nation	Played	Won	Drawn	Lost	For	Against	Diff	TBP	LBP	Table points
1	Moldova	3	3	0	0	83	19	+64	2	0	14
2	Denmark	3	2	0	1	95	46	+49	1	0	9
3	Finland	3	1	0	2	43	60	-17	1	0	5
4	Norway	3	0	0	3	3	104	-101	0	0	0
Source - Points were awarded to the teams as follows: Win – 4 points | Draw – 2 points | At least 3 more tries than opponent – 1 point | Loss within 7 points – 1 point | Completing a Grand Slam – 1 point

Matches

9 October 2021
14:00 CEST (UTC+02)

Denmark	29–19	Finland
	Report

Odense Athletics Stadium, Odense
Attendance: 500
Referee: Jonathan Teppler (Germany)

23 October 2021
15:00 CEST (UTC+02)

Norway	0–47	Denmark (1 TBP)
	Report

Bislett Stadium, Oslo
Attendance: 550
Referee: Liam Wright (Netherlands)

16 April 2022
n/a

(1 TBP) Moldova	28–0	Norway
	n/a

n/a
Attendance: n/a
Referee: n/a

7 May 2022
14:00 CEST (UTC+02)

Norway	3–24	Finland (1 TBP)
	Report

Kanalbanen stadion, Horten
Attendance: 100
Referee: David Horner (Denmark)

7 May 2022
15:00 CEST (UTC+02)

Denmark	19–27	Moldova
	Report

Odense Athletics Stadium, Odense
Attendance: 400
Referee: Artur Kisle (Latvia)

n/a
n/a

Finland	0–28	Moldova
	n/a

Myllypuro Stadium, Helsinki
Attendance: n/a
Referee: n/a

==== Conference 2 South ====
Champions and promoted

Place	Nation	Games				Points			TBP	LBP	Table points
Place	Nation	Played	Won	Drawn	Lost	For	Against	Diff	TBP	LBP	Table points
1	Bulgaria	4	4	0	0	134	61	+73	2	0	18
2	Serbia	4	3	0	1	110	74	+36	1	1	14
3	Andorra	4	1	0	3	69	72	+3	0	3	7
4	Bosnia and Herzegovina	4	1	1	2	81	124	-43	0	0	6
5	Turkey	4	0	1	3	55	132	-77	0	0	2
Source - Points were awarded to the teams as follows: Win – 4 points | Draw – 2 points | At least 3 more tries than opponent – 1 point | Loss within 7 points – 1 point | Completing a Grand Slam – 1 point

Matches

2 October 2021
13:55 CEST (UTC+2)

Bosnia and Herzegovina	24–49	Bulgaria (1 TBP)
	Report

Kamberovića Polje, Zenica
Attendance: 300
Referee: Francisco Serra, (Portugal)

9 October 2021
10:50 TRT (UTC+03)

Turkey	12–22	Andorra
	Report

Burdur MAKÜ Spor Toto Stadyumu, Burdur
Attendance: 1,000
Referee: Ivan Zelic (Croatia)

16 October 2021
15:00 CEST (UTC+02)

Bulgaria	14–11	Serbia (1 LBP)
	Report

National Sports Academy Stadium, Sofia
Attendance: 0
Referee: Valeriu Chipercean (Romania)

23 October 2021
14:00 CEST (UTC+02)

(1 TBP) Serbia	37–14	Turkey
	Report

Borac Starčevo, Starčevo
Attendance: 0
Referee: Valeriy Maksiuk (Ukraine)

30 October 2021
16:00 CEST (UTC+02)

(1 LBP) Andorra	18–19	Bosnia and Herzegovina
	Report

Estadi Nacional, Andorra la Vella
Attendance: 400
Referee: Adèle Robert (Belgium)

2 April 2022
14:00 CEST (UTC+02)

(1 LBP) Andorra	13–17	Bulgaria
	Report

Estadi Nacional, Andorra la Vella
Attendance: 250
Referee: Liam Wright (Netherlands)

16 April 2022
14:00 CEST (UTC+02)

Serbia	24–18	Andorra (1 LBP)
	Report

Borac Starčevo, Starčevo
Attendance: 400
Referee: Florin Bonea (Romania)

7 May 2022
15:00 CEST (UTC+2)

Bosnia and Herzegovina	19–38	Serbia
	Report

Kamberovića Polje, Zenica
Attendance: 350
Referee: Inaki Munoz (Spain)

7 May 2022
15:00 CEST (UTC+02)

(1 TBP) Bulgaria	54–13	Turkey
	Report

National Sports Academy Stadium, Sofia
Attendance: 4,000
Referee: Norbert Matrai (Hungary)

21 May 2022
12:00 TRT (UTC+03)

Turkey	19–19	Bosnia and Herzegovina
	Report

Edirne 25 Kasım Stadium, Edirne
Attendance: 300
Referee: Robert Diaconescu (Romania)

== 2022 Rugby Europe Development ==
Champions

Place	Nation	Games				Points			TBP	LBP	Table points
Place	Nation	Played	Won	Drawn	Lost	For	Against	Diff	TBP	LBP	Table points
1	Slovakia	1	1	0	0	65	0	+65	1	0	5
2	Montenegro	2	1	0	1	28	65	-37	1	0	5
3	Estonia	1	0	0	1	0	28	-28	0	0	0
Source - Points were awarded to the teams as follows: Win – 4 points | Draw – 2 points | At least 3 more tries than opponent – 1 point | Loss within 7 points – 1 point | Completing a Grand Slam – 1 point

Matches

23 April 2022
15:00 CET (UTC+01)

(1 TBP) Slovakia	65–0	Montenegro
	n/a

Bratislava Cunovo, Bratislava
Attendance: n/a
Referee: Diogo Inacio (Portugal)

14 May 2022
14:00 CEST (UTC+02)

(1 TBP) Montenegro	28–0	Estonia
	n/a

Stadion Topolica, Bar
Attendance: n/a
Referee: George Mossford (Finland)

n/a
n/a

Estonia	v	Slovakia

n/a
Referee: n/a
