= 2025–26 Rugby Europe Trophy =

European national rugby tournament

- Countries: Croatia; Czech Republic; Denmark; Lithuania; Poland; Sweden

Tournament statistics
- Champions: Czech Republic (1st title)
- Matches played: 15
- Attendance: 12,780 (852 per match)
- Tries scored: 138 (9.2 per match)

The 2025–26 Rugby Europe Trophy is the eighth season of the second premier rugby union competition for European national teams outside the Six Nations Championship which itself is a part of the Rugby Europe International Championships. The confirmed teams that are competing include Czechia, Croatia, Denmark, Lithuania, Poland and Sweden.

== Participants ==
Nation	Stadium			Head coach	Captain
Nation	Home stadium/stadia	Capacity	Location(s)	Head coach	Captain
Croatia	Gradski Sportski Centar; Stadion Stari plac	3,000; 3,000	Makarska; Split	(Croatia) Tonči Buzov	Nik Jurišić
Czech Republic	Markéta Stadium	10,000	Prague	(France) David Courteix	Jakub Havel
Denmark	Aalborg Rugbyklub; Erritsø Rugbystation	N/A	Aalborg; Fredericia	(Denmark) Andreas Robertson	Mikkel Andresen
Lithuania	Rugby Stadium Gardino	4,000	Šiauliai	(Lithuania) Gediminas Marcišauskas	Tautvydas Krasauskas
Poland	Municipal Stadium; Narodowy Stadion Rugby	8,000; 2,425	Siedlce; Gdynia	(Wales) Christian Hitt	Piotr Zeszutek
Sweden	Trelleborg Rugby Arena	2,000	Trelleborg	(England) Alex Laybourne	Philip Murphy

== Table ==
Champions
Relegated to Rugby Europe Conference

Pos	Team	Pld	W	D	L	PF	PA	PD	TF	TA	TB	LB	Pts
1	Czech Republic	5	5	0	0	305	111	+194	43	15	3	0	23
2	Poland	5	4	0	1	263	45	+218	38	5	4	1	21
3	Sweden	5	3	0	2	148	167	−19	23	24	2	0	14
4	Lithuania	5	1	0	4	97	212	−115	13	31	1	1	6
5	Denmark	5	1	0	4	121	233	−112	19	32	0	1	5
6	Croatia	5	1	0	4	92	258	−166	14	39	0	0	4

Source: Rugby Europe
Rules for classification:
If two teams have the same number of points the best ranked will be: 1) match points in the games played between the tied Unions; 2) tries in the games played between the tied Unions; 3) match points difference in all pool games; 4) tries difference for in all pool games; 5) match points for in all pool games.
If three or more teams have same number of points, the best ranked will be: 1) match points difference in all pool games; 2) tries for in all pool games; 4) match points for in all pool games.
Points were awarded to the teams as follows: Win – 4 points, Draw – 2 points, At least 3 more tries than opponent – 1 point, Loss within 7 points – 1 point

== Fixtures ==
25 October 2025
14:00 EEST (UTC+3)

Lithuania	8–41	Poland (1 TBP)
	Report

Rugby Stadium Gardino, Siauliai
Attendance: 300
Referee: (Spain) Alberto Diaz

25 October 2025
14:00 CEST (UTC+2)

(1 TBP) Sweden	57–12	Croatia
	Report

Trelleborg Rugby Arena,
Attendance: 250
Referee: (Poland) Adrian Pawlik

31 October 2025
20:00 CET (UTC+1)

Croatia	36–26	Denmark
	Report

Gradski Sportski Centar, Makarska
Attendance: 250
Referee: (Belgium) Adele Robert

1 November 2025
14:00 CET (UTC+1)

(1 TBP) Sweden	38–3	Lithuania
	Report

Trelleborg Rugby Arena, Trelleborg
Attendance: 300
Referee: (Georgia (country)) Papuna Chiqaberidze

8 November 2025
14:00 CET (UTC+1)

Croatia	33–55	Czech Republic
	Report

Stadion Stari plac, Split
Attendance: 400
Referee: (Netherlands) Liam Wright

8 November 2025
16:00 CET (UTC+1)

(1 TBP) Poland	47–6	Denmark
	Report

Municipal Stadium, Siedlce
Attendance: 2,500
Referee: (Sweden) Monray Gilbert

15 November 2025
14:00 CET (UTC+1)

Denmark	38–34	Lithuania (1 LBP)
	Report

Aalborg Rugbyklub, Aalborg
Attendance: 300
Referee: (Poland) Dominik Jastrzebski

15 November 2025
20:15 CET (UTC+1)

(1 TBP) Czech Republic	48–24	Sweden
	Report

Marketa Stadium, Prague
Attendance: 1,000
Referee: (Germany) Maria Latos

22 November 2025
13:00 CET (UTC+1)

(1 LBP) Poland	30–32	Czech Republic
	Report

Narodowy Stadion Rugby, Gdynia
Attendance: 2,300
Referee: (Romania) Andrei Gheorghe

28 February 2026
13:00 CET (UTC+1)

(1 TBP) Czech Republic	87–5	Lithuania
	Report

Marketa Stadium, Prague
Attendance: 1,000
Referee: (Croatia) Ivan Zelic

28 February 2026
14:00 CET (UTC+1)

Croatia	3-73	Poland (1 TBP)
	Report

Gradski Sportski Centar, Makarska
Attendance: 200
Referee: (Portugal) Diogo Inacio

4 April 2026
14:00 CEST (UTC+2)

Sweden	33–32	Denmark (1 LBP)
	Report

Trelleborg Rugby Arena
Attendance: 600
Referee: (Portugal) Marco Minelli

11 April 2026
14:00 CEST (UTC+2)

Denmark	19–83	Czech Republic (1 TBP)
	Report

Erritsø Rugbystation, Fredericia
Attendance: 450
Referee: (Germany) Paul Warman

11 April 2026
17:00 CEST (UTC+2)

(1 TBP) Poland	72–3	Sweden
	Report

Narodowy Stadion Rugby, Gdynia
Attendance: 2,430
Referee: (Scotland) Ruairidh Cambell

18 April 2026
14:00 EEST (UTC+3)

(1 TBP) Lithuania	47–8	Croatia
	Report

Rugby Stadium Gardino, Siauliai
Attendance: 500
Referee: (Germany) Benedikt Niklas

== Two-Year overall table ==
Pos	Team	Pld	W	D	L	PF	PA	PD	TF	TA	TB	LB	Pts	Promotion
1	Poland	10	9	0	1	445	135	+310	61	19	6	1	43	Rugby Europe Championship
2	Czech Republic	10	8	0	2	469	200	+269	59	24	5	2	39	
3	Sweden	10	7	0	3	340	280	+60	49	40	4	1	33	
4	Lithuania	10	2	0	8	202	394	−192	26	56	2	1	11	
5	Croatia	10	2	1	7	239	461	−222	39	66	0	0	10	
6	Denmark	5	1	0	4	121	233	−112	17	34	0	1	5	
7	Luxembourg	5	0	1	4	95	208	−113	11	26	0	0	2	

Updated to match(es) played on 28 February 2026. Source: Rugby Europe
Rules for classification:
If two teams have the same number of points the best ranked will be: 1) match points in the games played between the tied Unions; 2) tries in the games played between the tied Unions; 3) match points difference in all pool games; 4) tries difference for in all pool games; 5) match points for in all pool games.
If three or more teams have same number of points, the best ranked will be:1) match points difference in all pool games; 2) tries for in all pool games; 4) match points for in all pool games.
Points were awarded to the teams as follows: Win – 4 points, Draw – 2 points, At least 3 more tries than opponent – 1 point, Loss within 7 points – 1 point

== See also ==
- Rugby Europe International Championships
- Six Nations Championship
