= Sweden national rugby union team =

Men's national rugby union team representing Sweden

Sweden
- Union: Svenska Rugbyförbundet
- Head coach: (England) Alex Laybourne
- Captain: Axel Kalling-Smith
- Top scorer: Axel Kalling-Smith (23)
First colours

World Rugby ranking
- Current: 34 (as of 19 June 2026)
- Highest: 30 (2024)
- Lowest: 62 (2016)

First international
- Sweden 6–0 Denmark (23 October 1949)

Biggest win
- Luxembourg 3–116 Sweden (5 May 2001)

Biggest defeat
- Soviet Union 72–0 Sweden (1 July 1976)

World Cup
- Appearances: 0

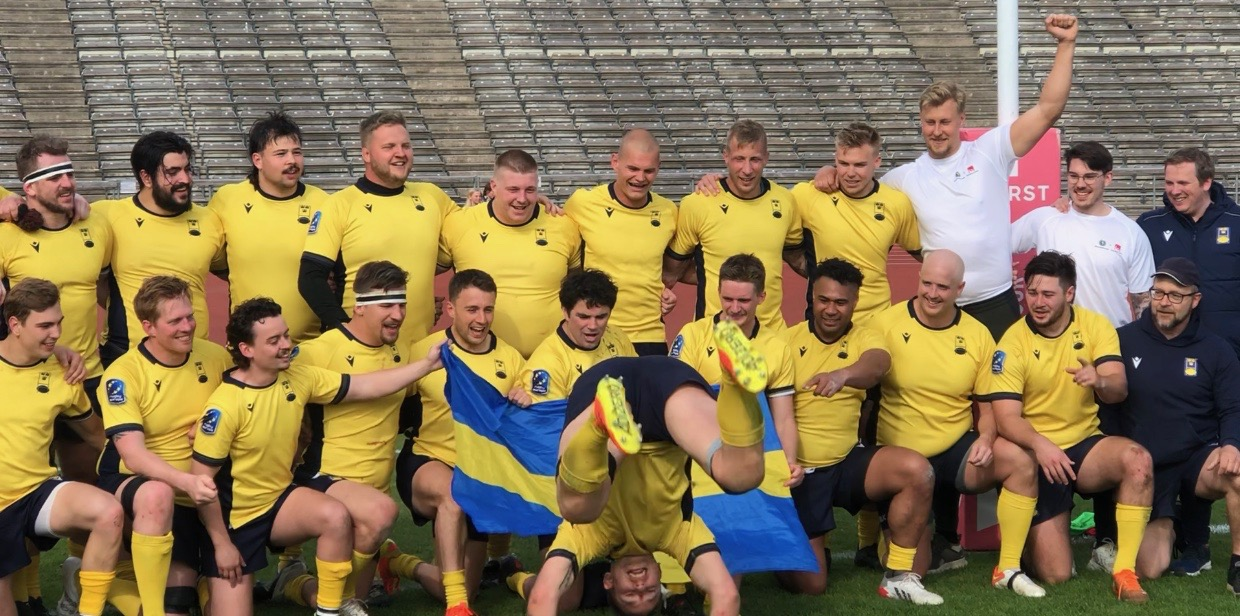
Sami Paulsson rolls into the picture after Sweden beat Czech Republic 28–18 at Stockholm's Stadion on May 14th 2022, winning Conference 1 North

The Sweden men's national rugby union team represents Sweden in rugby union. They currently compete in the Rugby Europe Trophy division, two levels of competition below the Six Nations.

== History ==
The national team is governed by the Swedish Rugby Union. Rugby has been played in Sweden since 1933. The first full international was played in 1949 against neighbours Denmark, a game Sweden won 6-0. Sweden has been a member union of World Rugby since 1988 and is one of the 48 members of Rugby Europe.

Sweden celebrated its 75th anniversary as a rugby nation in 2008.

Sweden have won several FIRA / Rugby Europe divisional competitions throughout their history, notably achieving Grand Slams in 1981-82 and 2021-2022. They also won five straight editions of the regional Nordic Cup between 1987 and 1991. Sweden have not yet successfully qualified for the Rugby World Cup.

In recent years the team has enjoyed a sustained period of relative success, having risen to their highest ever world ranking of 30th and going unbeaten in calendar year 2024. Following promotion to the Trophy in 2022, they have consolidated their position at this level having finished second in the table for three straight seasons, losing only to Switzerland and Poland.

In May 2025 the team was invited to compete in the inaugural Granite Trophy, a challenge match set up to showcase a newly formed combined Channel Islands rugby team composed of players drawn from Jersey and Guernsey.

== Honours ==
- 1981-82 FIRA Trophy Division 3 - Champions (Grand Slam)
- 1987 Nordic Cup - Champions
- 1988 Nordic Cup - Champions
- 1989 Nordic Cup - Champions
- 1990-92 FIRA Trophy Division 3 - Champions
- 1990 Nordic Cup - Champions
- 1991 Nordic Cup - Champions
- 2006-08 European Nations Cup Division 3 - Champions
- 2011-12 European Nations Cup Division 3 - Champions
- 2011 Viking Tri Nations - Champions
- 2022-23 Rugby Europe Conference 1 North - Champions (Grand Slam)

== Age grade and sevens ==
The Swedish Rugby Union also administers age grade rugby for both sexes; a women's national team and a Sevens national team.

== Home ground ==
Sweden currently play international matches primarily at the purpose built Trelleborg Rugby Arena, home of Pingvin RC. Built to replace Pingvin's former home Pilevallen, on which Pilehallen now stands, it was completed in 2024 and features an all-wooden covered grandstand and clubhouse.

In previous seasons games have also been played at Stockholm Olympic Stadium, Malmö Stadium and Bollspelaren in Norrköping.

== Players & Staff ==
Sweden draws its players both from its domestic clubs as well as players competing abroad.

=== Coaching Team ===
Coach	Role
(England) Alex Laybourne	Head Coach
(Finland) Pasi d'Niemelä	Team Manager
(England) Dan Rosies	Strength & Conditioning
(Australia) Karl Savimaki	Forwards Coach
(Sweden) Gunnar Mattiasson	Media & Analysis
(Sweden) Monica Häljetsig (Sweden) Jane Jaräker (Sweden) Olivia Palmgren	Physiotherapists

=== 2026/27 Squad ===
Forwards	Position	Club
Dan Cutler	Flanker	(Austria) Rugby Union Donau Wien
Marc Duvel	Prop	(Sweden) Hammarby IF Rugby
Elias Granath	Lock	(Sweden) Enköpings RK
Maxim Galet	Prop	(France) Gennevilliers Rugby
Nils Granath	Second Row	(Sweden) Enköping RC
Armir Kozhani	Hooker	(Sweden) Kalmar Södra IF
Gustav Lindberg	Prop	(Sweden) Malmö RC
Alexander Nahas	Prop	(Sweden) Erikslunds KF
Adam Nilsson	Second row	(Sweden) Erikslunds KF
Anthony Rafael	Flanker / Number 8	(Sweden) Stockholm Exiles
Daniel Roos	Number 8	(Sweden) Pingvin RC
Christopher Vannerberg	Lock	(France) GTO RC77
Jeremy Viala	Flanker	(Sweden) Stockholm Exiles
Levan Xhizanishvili	Prop / Hooker	(Sweden) Stockholm Exiles

Backs	Position	Club
Joar Blanck	Outside half	(Wales) Dunvant RFC
Samuel Ekfeldt	Centre / Wing	(Sweden) Stockholm Exiles
Fredrik Enstad	Scrum half	(Sweden) Vänersborgs RK
Robin Fransson	Fullback	(Sweden) Enköpings RK
Axel Kalling-Smith (C)	Centre	(England) Rams RFC
Setanta MacAodha	Wing	(Sweden) Enköpings RK
Hannes Nylén	Fullback	(Sweden) Enköpings RK
Karl Nilsson	Wing	(Sweden) Malmö RC
Mattias Nilsson	Scrum half	(France) Grenade Sports Rugby
Harry O'Reilly	Centre	(Sweden) IKSU
Jack Tatu Robertsson	Half back	(Latvia) RK Livonia
Kristian Thomson	Centre / Wing	(England) Barnes RFC

=== Uncapped 2026 Squad players ===
The following players participated in the non-cap international vs Gibraltar in March 2026 but are yet to make their full international debuts:

Player	Position	Club
Kyle Manson Kullin	Prop	(Sweden) Stockholm Exiles

=== Other/former squad players ===
The following players have either participated in a full-squad training session or taken part in a full senior international game since Autumn 2024:

Player	Position	Club
Samuel Ahlbeck	Wing	(Sweden) Malmö RC
Linus Ahlgren	Flanker	(Sweden) Pingvin RC
Vilhelm Carlsson	Lock	(Sweden) Stockholm Exiles
Adam Christersson	Hooker	(Sweden) Kalmar Södra IF
James Cole	Scrum half	(Sweden) Stockholm Exiles
Viktor Cordes	Prop	(Sweden) Lugi Rugbyklubb
Mathis De Chavaille	Wing	(France) CM Floirac Rugby
Jack Duffy	Scrum half	(Netherlands) Amsterdam Athletic Club
Lukas Edström	Flanker	(England) Newcastle University
Vaa Pusateri Iuta "Tezza" Fryxell	Number 8	(Sweden) Stockholm Exiles
Jonathan Hector	Wing	(Sweden) Vänersborgs RK
Petter Stråhle Heelge	Prop	(Latvia) RK Livonia
David Hill	Wing	(Sweden) Stockholm Exiles
Tim Johansson	Outside half	(Sweden) Enköpings RK

Player	Position	Club
Theodor Karlsson	Flanker	(Sweden) Stockholm Exiles
Oscar Larsson	Lock	(Sweden) Malmö RC
Ale Loman	Prop	(England) Leicester Tigers
Arthur Marini (ret)	Flanker	(France) Rugby Club de Drancy
Philip Murphy (ret)	Centre	(Ireland) Trinity College Dublin
Will Neilson	Hooker	(Wales) St. Joseph's RFC
Oliver Nilsson	Flanker	(Netherlands) ASRV Ascrum
Christopher Nilsérius	Prop / Hooker	(Sweden) Enköpings RK
Alfred Nordgren	Wing	(Sweden) Malmö RC
Eskil Flawn Orpana	Wing / Fullback	(Sweden) Pingvin RC
Elias Pettifor	Prop	(Sweden) Spartacus
Aron Qvarnström	Flanker	(Sweden) Spartacus
Christopher Sidgwick	Lock	(Sweden) NRK Troján
Adrian Wadden	Lock	(Canada) Oakville Crusaders

== Leading Try Scorers ==
Name	Tries
Axel Kalling-Smith	25
Ian Gowland	21
Andreas Bruhn	18
Kari Tapper	16
Kanogo Njuru	14
Bobby Nave	13
Alan Letele	12
Theodor Karlsson	12
Johan Andersson	11
Alfred Nordgren	10
Thomas Arvidsson	10

== Kit Manufacturers ==
Manufacturer	Years
(Italy) Macron	2020 - present
(Australia) BLK	2017 - 2020
(Wales) Olorun	2011 - 2017
(England) Gilbert Rugby	2005 - 2006
(New Zealand) Canterbury	2005

== Upcoming Season ==
=== 2026-27 Rugby Europe Trophy ===
==== Table ====
Champions and advances to Promotion/relegation play-off
Relegated to Rugby Europe Conference

Pos	Team	Pld	W	D	L	PF	PA	PD	TF	TA	TB	LB	Pts
1	Czech Republic	2	2	0	0	83	52	+31	13	8	1	0	9
2	Malta	2	2	0	0	73	48	+25	9	7	0	0	8
3	Germany	2	1	0	1	85	44	+41	12	5	1	1	6
4	Sweden	2	1	0	1	88	53	+35	14	8	1	1	6
5	Denmark	2	0	0	2	41	88	−47	7	13	0	0	0
6	Lithuania	2	0	0	2	29	114	−85	4	18	0	0	0

Updated to match(es) played on 7 November 2026. Source: Rugby Europe
Rules for classification:
If two teams have the same number of points the best ranked will be: 1) match points in the games played between the tied Unions; 2) tries in the games played between the tied Unions; 3) match points difference in all pool games; 4) tries difference for in all pool games; 5) match points for in all pool games.
If three or more teams have same number of points, the best ranked will be: 1) match points difference in all pool games; 2) tries for in all pool games; 4) match points for in all pool games.
Points were awarded to the teams as follows: Win – 4 points, Draw – 2 points, At least 3 more tries than opponent – 1 point, Loss within 7 points – 1 point

Key:
↓ Relegated from 2026 Rugby Europe Championship
↑ Promoted from 2025-26 Rugby Europe Conference

==== Fixtures ====
31 October 2026
14:00 CET (UTC+1)

Sweden	28 - 31	Czech Republic
Try: Kozhani 2' c M Nilsson 26' c Kalling-Smith 31' m Con: Tatu-Robertsson (2/3) 3' 27'; Pen: Tatu-Robertsson (3/3) 23' 38' 52'	Report	Try: Koblic 10' c Cimprich 12' c Sehnal 48' c Kulhavy 71' c Con: Cimprich (4/4) 11' 13' 49' 72'; Pen: Cimprich (1/2) 62'; Cards: Kulhavy (yellow card) 22', Brada (yellow card) 38'

Trelleborg Rugby Arena
Attendance: 400
Referee: (Denmark) Emmanuel Jasques

7 November 2026
14:00 EET (UTC+2)

Lithuania	22 - 60	Sweden
Try: Skinulis 3' c Marcinkus 35' m Aleksanian 59' c Con: Taujanskas (2/3) 6' 59'; Pen: Taujanskas 13'; Cards: Aleksanian (yellow card) 75'	Report	Try: Duvel 10' c Kalling-Smith 15' c Kozhani (3) 17' m, 22' c, 32' c Fransson 61' m K Nilsson 64' m M Nilsson 72' c O'Reilly 77' m Rafael 79' m Con: Tatu-Robertsson (4/5) 11' 15' 23' 33'; M Nilsson (1/5) 73'; Cards: A Nilsson (red card) 56'

Rugby Stadium Gardino, Šiauliai
Attendance: 350
Referee: (Poland) Lech Mieszko

14 November 2026

Malta	v	Sweden

Tony Bezzina Stadium

27 March 2027

Germany	v	Sweden

Fritz-Grunebaum-Sportpark

3 April 2027

Sweden	v	Denmark

TBC

== Recent Results ==
The following is a list of test and representative matches since 2018.

=== 2026-27 Season ===
Date	Opponent	Venue	Competition	Result	Score
31 October 2026	Czech Republic	Trelleborg, Sweden	Rugby Europe Trophy	L	28 - 31
7 November 2026	Lithuania	Šiauliai Rugby Academy Stadium, Lithuania	Rugby Europe Trophy	W	22 - 60
14 November 2026	Malta	Tony Bezzina Stadium, Paola	Rugby Europe Trophy		
27 March 2027	Germany	TBC, Germany	Rugby Europe Trophy		
2 April 2027	Denmark	TBC, Sweden	Rugby Europe Trophy		

=== 2025-26 Season ===
Date	Opponent	Venue	Competition	Result	Score
25 October 2025	Croatia	Trelleborg, Sweden	Rugby Europe Trophy	W	57 - 12
1 November 2025	Lithuania	Trelleborg, Sweden	Rugby Europe Trophy	W	38 - 3
15 November 2025	Czech Republic	Břevnov, Prague, Czech Republic	Rugby Europe Trophy	L	48 - 24
21 March 2026	Gibraltar	Europa Point Stadium, Gibraltar	Non-cap friendly	W	13 - 37
4 April 2026	Denmark	Trelleborg, Sweden	Rugby Europe Trophy	W	33 - 32
11 April 2026	Poland	Gdynia, Poland	Rugby Europe Trophy	L	72 - 3

=== 2024-25 Season ===
Date	Opponent	Venue	Competition	Result	Score
27 October 2024	Czech Republic	Trelleborg, Sweden	Rugby Europe Trophy	W	22 - 16
2 November 2024	Lithuania	Aukštaitija Stadium, Lithuania	Rugby Europe Trophy	W	19 - 46
16 November 2024	Croatia	NSC Stjepan Spajic, Zagreb, Croatia	Rugby Europe Trophy	W	31 - 42
16 March 2025	Denmark	Häljarp, Sweden	Non-cap Friendly	W	47 - 11
29 March 2025	Luxembourg	Stade de Luxembourg	Rugby Europe Trophy	W	18 - 57
12 April 2025	Poland	Trelleborg, Sweden	Rugby Europe Trophy	L	25 - 29
17 May 2025	(Jersey) (Guernsey) (Alderney) (Herm) (Sark); Channel Islands	Footes Lane, Guernsey	Granite Trophy (Non-cap Friendly)	L	28 - 66

=== 2023-24 Season ===
Date	Opponent	Venue	Competition	Result	Score
28 October 2023	Czech Republic	Stockholm Olympic Stadium, Sweden	Rugby Europe Trophy	W	48 - 37
4 November 2023	Switzerland	Stade Municipal, Yverdon-les-Bains, Switzerland	Rugby Europe Trophy	L	23 - 12
18 November 2023	Croatia	Gradski sportski centar, Makarska, Croatia	Rugby Europe Trophy	W	20 - 22
23 March 2024	Lithuania	Šiauliai Rugby Academy Stadium, Lithuania	Rugby Europe Trophy	W	8 - 27
6 April 2024	Ukraine	Östervangsstadion, Trelleborg, Sweden	Rugby Europe Trophy	W	36 - 24

=== 2022-23 Season ===
Date	Opponent	Venue	Competition	Result	Score
October 29, 2022	Croatia	Stockholm Olympic Stadium, Sweden	Rugby Europe Trophy	W	37 - 17
November 5, 2022	Switzerland	Malmö Stadion, Sweden	Rugby Europe Trophy	L	12 - 69
March 5, 2023	Catalonia	Foixarda, Barcelona	Friendly	L	51 - 14
March 18, 2023	Ukraine	Stadion Stari plac, Split, Croatia ‡	Rugby Europe Trophy	L	38 - 15
April 1, 2023	Lithuania	Šiauliai Rugby Academy Stadium, Lithuania	Rugby Europe Trophy	W	15 - 18

‡ Ukraine played their home game in Croatia due to the 2022 Russian Invasion of Ukraine

=== 2021-22 Season ===
Date	Opponent	Venue	Competition	Result	Score
23 October 2021	Luxembourg	Bollspelaren, Norrköping, Sweden	Rugby Europe Conference 1 North	W	51 - 5
23 April 2022	Latvia	Baldones Stadions, Baldone, Latvia	Rugby Europe Conference 1 North	W	25 - 46
7 May 2022	Hungary	Budapest Rugby Center, Hungary	Rugby Europe Conference 1 North	W	25 - 29
14 May 2022	Czech Republic	Stockholm Olympic Stadium, Sweden	Rugby Europe Conference 1 North	W	28 - 18

=== 2019-20 Season ===
Date	Opponent	Venue	Competition	Result	Score
26 October 2019	Latvia	Sloka Stadium, Jurmala, Latvia	Rugby Europe Conference 1 North †	W	22 - 26
2 November 2019	Luxembourg	Malmö Stadion, Sweden	Rugby Europe Conference 1 North †	L	0 - 13

† Competition cancelled mid-season due to the COVID-19 pandemic

=== 2018-19 Season ===
Date	Opponent	Venue	Competition	Result	Score
20 October 2018	Moldova	Bollspelaren, Norrköping, Sweden	Rugby Europe Conference 1 North	W	80 - 6
3 November 2018	Luxembourg	Stade Josy Barthel, Luxembourg	Rugby Europe Conference 1 North	W	9 - 10
11 May 2019	Hungary	Bollspelaren, Norrköping, Sweden	Rugby Europe Conference 1 North	W	36 - 27
19 May 2019	Ukraine	Spartak Stadium, Odesa, Ukraine	Rugby Europe Conference 1 North	L	23 - 14

=== 2017-18 Season ===
Date	Opponent	Venue	Competition	Result	Score
14 October 2017	Hungary	Bollspelaren, Norrköping, Sweden	Rugby Europe Conference 1 North	W	12 - 10
28 October 2017	Ukraine	Spartak Stadium, Odesa, Ukraine	Rugby Europe Conference 1 North	L	29 - 8
14 April 2018	(England) Dorking RFC	Brockham, Surrey, England	Non-cap friendly	W	74 - 5
28 April 2018	Lithuania	Centrinis Stadionas, Telšiai, Lithuania	Rugby Europe Conference 1 North	L	43 - 22
12 May 2018	Latvia	Enköping, Sweden	Rugby Europe Conference 1 North	W	50 - 27

== Recent Tournament Record ==
=== 2025-26 Rugby Europe Trophy ===
==== Results ====
25 October 2025	Sweden	57 - 12	Croatia	Trelleborg Rugby Arena
14:00 CEST (UTC+2)	Try: E Granath 10' c Loman 36' m De Chavaille 42' m, 76'c Aron Qvarnström 52' c Fryxell 66' c Hector 70' c Kalling-Smith 80' m Con: Tatu-Robertsson (6/9) 11', 21', 53', 67', 71', 77'	Report	Try: Mau'u 3' m Galic 40+1' c Con: Newton (1/2) 40+2'	Referee: (Poland) Adrian Pawlik

- Joar Blanck and Levan Xhizanishvili made their full team debuts
- Axel Kalling-Smith scored his 23rd try for Sweden, extending the national team record

1 November 2025	Sweden	38 - 3	Lithuania	Trelleborg Rugby Arena
14:00 CET (UTC+1)	Try: Marini 3' c Rafael 33' c Eckfeldt (2) 38' m, 50' c Kalling-Smith 59' m O Nilsson 67' c Con: Tatu-Robertsson (4/6) 4', 34', 51', 61', 68'	Report	Pen: Taujanskas 23'	Referee: (Georgia (country)) Papuna Chiqaberidze

- First international try for Anthony Rafael
- First international try for Oliver Nilsson
- First international tries for Samuel Eckfeldt
- Axel Kalling-Smith scored his 24th try for Sweden, extending the national team record
- First time Sweden had kept the opposition from scoring a try since November 2018 match v Luxembourg

15 November 2025	Czech Republic	48 - 24	Sweden	Marketa Stadium, Prague
20:15 CET (UTC+1)	Try: Cimprich 9' c Havel 14' c Koblic 16' c Miracky (2) 33' m, 36' m Kulhavy 50' c Aschenbrenner 60' c Con: Cimprich (5/7) 10', 15', 17', 51', 61' Pen: Horak 11' Cards: Schutz (yellow card) 5', (red card) 57'	Report	Try: Karlsson (2) 6' c, 27' c Tatu-Robertsson 78' c Con: Tatu-Robertsson (3/3) 7', 28', 79' Pen: Tatu-Robertsson 40' Cards: Tatu-Robertsson (yellow card) 9', De Chavaille (yellow card) 57'	Referee: (Germany) Maria Latos

- First win for Czech Republic against Sweden since 2016

4 April 2026	Sweden	33 - 32	Denmark	Trelleborg Rugby Arena
14:00 CEST (UTC+2)	Try: Johansson 11'm Karlsson 29' c Rafael 47' c Hector 73' c Thomson 78' c Con: Tatu-Robertsson (4/5) 30', 48', 74', 79'	Report	Try: Holm 24' m Mayne 33' m Coleman 40' c Maidens 51' m Haedo 80+3' c Con: B Wiggins (2/5) 40', 80+3' Pen: B Wiggins 9' Cards: Jorgensen (yellow card) 75'	Attendance: 650; Referee: Portugal Marco Minelli

- Full-cap debuts for Will Neilson, Kristian Thomson and Lukas Edström, first competitive start for Joar Blanck
- First try for Sweden for Kristian Thomson
- First competitive FIRA/Rugby Europe match between Sweden and Denmark since 2007
- Sweden have now won 41 of the 54 recorded matches vs Denmark

11 April 2026	Poland	72 - 3	Sweden	Narodowy Stadion Rugby, Gdynia
20:00 CEST (UTC+2)	Try: Saborit 7' m Piortowicz 10' c Wrobel 36' c Janiec (2) 38' c, 41' c Bartoszewicz-Malicki 40' c Malecki 45' c Wilczuk (2) 57' c, 80' m Pilchta 71' c Con: Piortowiz (8/10) 11', 37', 39', 40', 42', 45', 58', 73' Pen: Piortowiz (2/2) 2', 70'	Report	Pen: J Tatu-Robertsson 14'	Referee: Scotland Ruairidh Campbell

- Sweden's second-worst ever defeat, just behind a 72-0 loss to the Soviet Union in 1976
- Last matches for captain Philip Murphy and second row Arthur Marini who both retired from the international team after this game

==== Table ====
Champions
Relegated to Rugby Europe Conference

Pos	Team	Pld	W	D	L	PF	PA	PD	TF	TA	TB	LB	Pts
1	Czech Republic	5	5	0	0	305	111	+194	43	15	3	0	23
2	Poland	5	4	0	1	263	45	+218	38	5	4	1	21
3	Sweden	5	3	0	2	148	167	−19	23	24	2	0	14
4	Denmark	5	1	0	4	121	233	−112	19	32	0	1	5
5	Croatia	4	1	0	3	84	211	−127	13	32	0	0	4
6	Lithuania	4	0	0	4	50	204	−154	6	30	0	1	1

Updated to match(es) played on 28 February 2026. Source: Rugby Europe
Rules for classification:
If two teams have the same number of points the best ranked will be: 1) match points in the games played between the tied Unions; 2) tries in the games played between the tied Unions; 3) match points difference in all pool games; 4) tries difference for in all pool games; 5) match points for in all pool games.
If three or more teams have same number of points, the best ranked will be: 1) match points difference in all pool games; 2) tries for in all pool games; 4) match points for in all pool games.
Points were awarded to the teams as follows: Win – 4 points, Draw – 2 points, At least 3 more tries than opponent – 1 point, Loss within 7 points – 1 point

Key:
↑ 2025 promoted side

=== Mid-season Friendly ===
21 March 2026	Gibraltar	13 - 37	Sweden	Europa Point Stadium, Gibraltar
13:30 CET (UTC+1)	Try: Morris 17' c Con: Morris 18' Pen: Morris 37'	Report	Try: MacAodha 21' c Neilson 26' m Nylèn 28' m Fryxell 40' m Fransson 55' m Carlsson 70' m K Nilsson 80+4' m Con: Nylèn 1/4 22' Cards: Xhizasnishvili (yellow card) 80'	Referee: Harry Parsons (RFU)

FB	15	Chris Porral
RW	14	Pablo Kussner
OC	13	Charlie Baker
IC	12	Simon Adamson
LW	11	Chris Winrow
FH	10	Benn Morris
SH	9	Euan Kent
N8	8	Tristan Lark
OF	7	Oscar Cruz (c)
BF	6	Charlie Hill
RL	5	Kalib Falconer
LL	4	Ollie Porral
TP	3	Kris Timmins
HK	2	Luke Payas
LP	1	Tommy Grimes
Replacements:
	16	Phil Nilsen
	17	Stefan Tilbury
	18	Aidan Beazley
	19	Joey Galloway
	20	James Savignon
	21	Max Wiseman
	22	Harvey Leroy
	23	Julian Turnock
	24	Ashley White

FB	15	Hannes Nylen
RW	14	Samuel Ahlbäck
OC	13	Kristian Thomson
IC	12	Philip Murphy (c)
LW	11	Setanta MacAodha
FH	23	Tim Johansson
SH	9	Jack Duffy
N8	8	Theodor Karlsson
OF	7	Lukas Edström
BF	6	Vaa Iuta Fryxell
RL	5	Christopher Sidgwick
LL	4	Elias Granath
TP	3	Anthony Rafael
HK	2	Will Neilson
LP	1	Kyle Manson-Kullin
Replacements:
	16	Armir Kozhani
	17	Levan Xhizanishvili
	18	Adam Christersson
	19	Christopher Vannerberg
	20	Karl Nilsson
	21	David Hill
	22	Robin Fransson
	10	Jonathan Hector
	24	Dan Cutler
	24	Vilhelm Carlsson

- Dan Cutler, Lukas Edström, Setanta MacAodha, Kyle Manson-Kullin, Will Neilson, Karl Nilsson and Kristian Thomson made their full team debuts, with MacAodha, Neilson and Nilsson all scoring tries.
- Gibraltar's second ever full international

=== 2024-25 Rugby Europe Trophy ===
==== Results ====
26 October 2024
14:00 CEST (UTC+2)

Sweden	22–16	Czech Republic (1 LBP)
	Report

Trelleborg Rugby Arena, Trelleborg
Attendance: 600
Referee: Andrei Gheorghe (Romania)

2 November 2024
14:00 EET (UTC+2)

Lithuania	19–46	Sweden (1 TBP)
	Report

Aukštaitija Stadium, Panevėžys
Attendance: 300
Referee: Francisco Serra (Portugal)

16 November 2024
14:00 CET (UTC +1)

Croatia	31–42	Sweden
	Report

Stadion Lučko, Zagreb
Attendance: 300
Referee: Maria Latos (Germany)

29 March 2025
18:00 CET (UTC+1)

Luxembourg	18–57	Sweden (1 TBP)
	Report

Stade de Luxembourg, Luxembourg
Attendance: 1,100
Referee: Saba Makharadze (Georgia)

12 April 2025
15:00 CEST (UTC+1)

(1 LBP) Sweden	25–29	Poland
	Report

Trelleborg Rugby Arena, Trelleborg
Attendance: 850
Referee: Nicolae Fratila (Romania)

==== Table ====
Trophy	WR	Pld	W	D	L	PF	PA	PD	TF	TA	TB	LB	Pts
Poland	28	5	5	0	0	182	90	+92	23	14	2	0	22
Sweden	31	5	4	0	1	192	113	+79	26	16	2	1	19
Czech Republic	32	5	3	0	2	164	89	+75	20	9	2	2	16
Croatia	33	5	1	1	3	147	203	-56	22	27	0	0	6
Lithuania	34	5	1	0	4	105	182	-77	13	25	1	0	5
Luxembourg ↑▼	37	5	0	1	4	95	208	-113	11	26	0	0	2

Key:
↑ 2024 promoted side
▼ Relegated to 2025/6 Rugby Europe Conference
WR World Ranking as of April 2025

=== 2025 Granite Trophy ===
17 May 2025	Channel Islands (Jersey) (Guernsey) (Alderney) (Herm) (Sark)	66 - 28	Sweden	Footes Lane, Guernsey
19:30 BST (UTC+1)		Report

=== 2023-24 Rugby Europe Trophy ===
==== Results ====
28 October 2023
14:00 CEST (UTC+2)

Sweden	48–37	Czech Republic
	Report

Stockholm Olympic Stadium, Stockholm
Attendance: 1,400
Referee: Eugeniu Procopi (Moldova)

4 November 2023
15:30 CET (UTC+1)

Switzerland	23–12	Sweden
	Report

Stade Municipal, Yverdon-les-Bains
Attendance: n/a
Referee: Killian O'Brien (Germany)

18 November 2023
14:30 CET (UTC +1)

(1 LBP) Croatia	20–22	Sweden
	Report

Stadion NŠC Stjepan Spajić, Zagreb
Attendance: 1,000
Referee: Lukasz Jasinski (Poland)

23 March 2024
14:00 EET (UTC+2)

Lithuania	8–27	Sweden (1 TBP)
	Report

Šiauliai Rugby Academy Stadium, Šiauliai
Attendance: 300
Referee: Pedro Mendes-Silva (Portugal)

6 April 2024
14:00 CEST (UTC+2)

(1 TBP) Sweden	36–24	Ukraine
	Report

Östervångsstadion, Trelleborg
Attendance: 1,200
Referee: Gert Visser (Netherlands)

==== Table ====
Trophy	WR	Pl	W	D	L	B	F	A	DIFF	Pts
Switzerland ▲	28	5	5	0	0	2	198	64	134	22
Sweden	31	5	4	0	1	2	145	112	33	18
Czech Republic ↑	32	5	3	0	2	2	192	153	39	14
Croatia	33	5	2	3	3	3	130	132	-2	11
Lithuania	34	5	1	0	4	0	103	143	-40	4
Ukraine ▼	37	5	0	0	5	0	61	225	-164	0

Key:
↑ 2023 promoted side
▲ Promoted to 2025 Rugby Europe Championship
▼ Relegated to 2024/5 Rugby Europe Conference North
WR World Ranking as of April 2024

=== 2022-23 Rugby Europe Trophy ===
==== Results ====
29 October 2022
14:00 CEST (UTC +2)

(1TBP) Sweden	37–17	Croatia
	Report

Olympiastadion, Stockholm
Attendance: 1,500
Referee: Eugeniu Procopi (Moldova)

5 November 2022
14:00 CET (UTC +1)

Sweden	12–69	Switzerland (1 TBP)
	Report

Malmö Stadion, Malmö
Attendance: 200
Referee: Ignacio Munoz-Martin (Spain)

18 March 2023
15:30 CET (UTC +1)

(1 TBP) Ukraine	38–15	Sweden
	Report

Stari plac, Split
Attendance: 250
Referee: Kevin Sulejmani (Belgium)

1 April 2023
14:00 EEST (UTC +3)

(1 LBP) Lithuania	15–18	Sweden
	Report

Regbio stadionas, Šiauliai
Attendance: n/a
Referee: Lukasz Jasinski (Poland)

==== Table ====
Trophy	WR	Pl	W	D	L	B	F	A	DIFF	Pts
Switzerland	27	4	4	0	0	3	205	72	133	19
Ukraine	36	4	2	0	2	1	117	135	-18	9
Sweden ↑	39	4	2	0	2	1	82	139	-57	9
Lithuania	52	4	1	0	3	3	97	122	-25	7
Croatia ↑	42	4	1	0	3	1	100	133	-33	5

Key:
↑ 2022 promoted sides
WR World Ranking April 2023

=== 2021-22 Rugby Europe Conference 1 North ===
==== Results ====
23 October 2021
14:00 CEST (UTC +2)

(1 TBP) Sweden	51–5	Luxembourg
	Report

Bollspelaren, Norrköping
Attendance: 305
Referee: Artur Kisle (Latvia)

23 April 2022
15:00 EEST (UTC+03)

Latvia	25–46	Sweden (1 TBP)
	Report

Baldones stadions, Baldone
Attendance: 200
Referee: Mike Hawkins (Denmark)

7 May 2022
14:00 CEST (UTC +2)

(1 LBP) Hungary	25–29	Sweden
	Report

Rugby Center at Kincsem Park, Budapest
Attendance: 800
Referee: Nicolas Vandecauter (Belgium)

14 May 2022
14:00 CEST (UTC +2)

Sweden	28–18	Czech Republic
	Report

Olympiastadion, Stockholm
Referee: Kilian O'Brien (Germany)

==== Table ====
Conference 1 North	WR	Pl	W	D	L	B	F	A	DIFF	Pts
Sweden ▲	38	4	4	0	0	3	154	81	71	19
Czech Republic ↓	37	4	3	0	1	3	142	70	72	15
Latvia ↑	63	3	1	0	2	1	74	109	-35	5
Luxembourg	61	4	1	0	3	0	56	145	-89	4
Hungary	64	3	0	0	3	2	61	90	-29	2

Key:
▲ Promoted to Rugby Europe Trophy
↑ 2019 promoted side
↓ 2019 relegated side
WR World Ranking May 2022

== Overall tournament record ==
=== 2017-present : Rugby Europe International Championships ===
Season	Competition	Single season position	Overall season position
2026 - 2027	Rugby Europe Trophy	TBD (of 6)	
2024 - 2026	Rugby Europe Trophy	3rd (of 6)	3rd (of 7)
2024 - 2026	Rugby Europe Trophy	2nd (of 6)	3rd (of 7)
2022 - 2024	Rugby Europe Trophy	2nd (of 6)	2nd (of 5)
2022 - 2024	Rugby Europe Trophy	2nd (of 5)	2nd (of 5)
2021 - 2022	Rugby Europe Conference 1 North	1st (of 5) Grand Slam Champions; Promoted to Trophy	
2019 - 2020	Rugby Europe Conference 1 North	N/A Season cancelled due to COVID-19 pandemic	
2018 - 2019	Rugby Europe Conference 1 North	2nd (of 5)	
2017 - 2018	Rugby Europe Conference 1 North	3rd (of 5)	
2016 - 2017	Rugby Europe Conference 1 North	4th (of 5)	

=== 2000-2016 : FIRA-AER European Nations Cup ===
Season	Competition	Single season position	Overall season position
2014 - 2016	European Nations Cup - Division 1B	6th (of 6)	6th (of 6); Relegated to Conference 1
2014 - 2016	European Nations Cup - Division 1B	6th (of 6)	6th (of 6); Relegated to Conference 1
2012 - 2014	European Nations Cup - Division 1B	6th (of 6)	5th (of 6)
2012 - 2014	European Nations Cup - Division 1B	4th (of 6)	5th (of 6)
2010 - 2012	European Nations Cup - Division 2A	3rd (of 5)	1st (of 5) Champions; Promoted to Division 1B
2010 - 2012	European Nations Cup - Division 2A	1st (of 5)	1st (of 5) Champions; Promoted to Division 1B
2008 - 2010	European Nations Cup Division 2B	4th (of 5)	
2006 - 2008	European Nations Cup Division 3A	1st (of 5) Champions; Promoted to Division 2B	
2004 - 2006	European Nations Cup Third Division Pool A	2nd (of 5)	
2002 - 2004	European Nations Cup Second Division Pool A	5th (of 5); Relegated to Third Division	
2000 - 2002	World Cup Qualifying Round 2 Pool A	3rd (of 5)	Did not qualify
2000 - 2002	World Cup Qualifying Round 1 Pool A	1st (of 6)	Did not qualify
1999 - 2000	European Nations Cup Fourth Division Pool 3	1st (of 4) Champions (No promotion)	

=== 1967-1999 : FIRA ===
Season	Competition	Position
1998 - 1999	FIRA Tournament Pool 3	3rd (of 4)
1996 - 1998	World Cup Qualifying Pool 3	2nd (of 5) - Did Not Qualify
1992 - 1994	World Cup Qualifying Round 1 Central Group	3rd (of 4) - Did Not Qualify
1992 - 1994	FIRA Trophy Second Division Pool A	5th (of 5)
1990 - 1992	FIRA Trophy Third Division Pool 2 Nordic Cup	1st (of 4) Champions; Promoted to Second Division
1989 - 1990	World Cup Qualifying - Preliminary Competition	Did Not Qualify
1985 - 1987	FIRA Trophy Second Division Pool B	4th (of 4)
1984 - 1985	FIRA Trophy Third Division	4th (of 4)
1983 - 1984	FIRA Trophy Second Division Pool B	3rd (of 5)
1982 - 1983	FIRA Trophy Second Division	5th (of 5)
1981 - 1982	FIRA Trophy Third Division	1st (of 5) Grand Slam Champions; Promoted to Second Division
1980 - 1981	FIRA Trophy Third Division	3rd (of 5)
1979 - 1980	FIRA Trophy Second Division	5th (of 5); Relegated to Third Division
1978 - 1979	FIRA Trophy Second Division Pool 2	4th (of 4)
1977 - 1978	FIRA Trophy Second Division Pool 2	2nd (of 3)
1976 - 1977	FIRA Trophy Second Division	4th (of 5)
1967 - 1968	FIRA Nations Cup Division 2 Pool 1	3rd (of 3)

=== Rugby World Cup Qualification ===
World Cup record								World Cup Qualification record					
Year	Round	P	W	D	L	F	A	P	W	D	L	F	A
(Australia) (New Zealand) 1987	Not Invited							Not Invited					
(United Kingdom) (Ireland) (France) 1991	Did not qualify							4	3	0	1	101	49
(South Africa) 1995	Did not qualify							3	1	0	2	39	75
(Wales) 1999	Did not qualify							4	3	0	1	191	60
(Australia) 2003	Did not qualify							9	7	0	2	315	99
(France) 2007	Did not qualify							6	3	0	3	110	138
(New Zealand) 2011	Did not qualify							4	1	0	3	64	73
(England) 2015	Did not qualify							10	3	0	7	193	307
(Japan) 2019	Did not qualify							4	1	0	3	56	124
(France) 2023	Did not qualify							Automatically eliminated					
(Australia) 2027	Did not qualify							Automatically eliminated					
(United States) 2031	To be determined												
Total	0/11	0	0	0	0	0	0	44	22	0	22	1069	925

=== Minor & Regional Comptitions ===
Competition	Format	Other teams	W	D	L	Result
2025 Granite Trophy	Challenge Match	(Jersey) (Guernsey) Channel Islands XV	0	0	1	Runners up
2011 Viking Tri Nations	Round robin	Denmark; Norway	2	0	0	Champions
1995 Baltic Cup	Knockout / Playoff for position	Denmark; Norway; Poland; Russia	0	0	3	4th place
1993 Nordic Cup	Knockout	Denmark; Denmark A Norway	1	0	1	2nd place Lost to Denmark in final
1992 Nordic Cup	Round robin	Denmark; Norway	1	0	1	2nd place
1991 Nordic Cup	Knockout	Denmark; Finland; Norway	2	0	0	Champions
1990 Nordic Cup	Knockout	Denmark; Finland; Norway	2	0	0	Champions
1989 Nordic Cup	Knockout	Denmark; Finland; Norway	2	0	0	Champions
1988 Nordic Cup	Knockout	Denmark; Denmark A Norway	2	0	0	Champions
1987 Nordic Cup	Knockout	Denmark; Finland; Norway	2	0	0	Champions
1971 Gothenburg Trophy	Round robin	(Czech Republic) Czechoslovakia XV; Denmark; Netherlands	3	1	0	Unknown (at least 2nd place)

== Head to Head Records ==
Below is a table of the representative rugby matches played by a Sweden national XV at test level up until 14 November 2026, updated after match with Malta.

Opponent	Played	Won	Lost	Drawn	% Won
Andorra	6	2	4	0	33.33%
Armenia	2	1	1	0	50%
Austria	2	2	0	0	100%
Belgium	15	4	11	0	26.67%
Catalonia	1	1	0	0	100%
Croatia	8	7	1	0	87.5%
Czechoslovakia	6	0	6	0	0%
Czech Republic	10	5	5	0	50%
Denmark	54	41	10	3	75.93%
East Germany	3	0	3	0	0%
Finland	2	2	0	0	100%
Gibraltar	2	1	1	0	50%
Germany	5	1	4	0	20%
Hungary	4	4	0	0	100%
Israel	3	3	0	0	100%
Latvia	13	9	4	0	69.23%
Lithuania	14	11	2	1	78.57%
Luxembourg	8	7	1	0	87.5%
Malta	5	1	4	0	20%
Moldova	5	3	2	0	60%
Netherlands	21	1	20	0	4.76%
Norway	7	7	0	0	100%
Poland	18	1	15	2	5.56%
Portugal	2	0	2	0	0%
Serbia	2	2	0	0	100%
Soviet Union	2	0	2	0	0%
Spain	2	0	2	0	0%
Switzerland	8	6	2	0	75%
Tunisia	1	0	1	0	0%
Ukraine	10	1	9	0	10%
Yugoslavia	3	1	2	0	33.33%
West Germany	5	2	3	0	40%
Total	240	118	116	6	49.17%
