= 2023–24 Rugby Europe Trophy =

European national rugby tournament

- Date: 28 October 2023 - 13 April 2024
- Countries: Croatia; Czech Republic; Lithuania; Sweden; Switzerland; Ukraine

Tournament statistics
- Champions: Switzerland (2nd title)
- Matches played: 15
- Attendance: 13,818 (921 per match)
- Tries scored: 111 (7.4 per match)

The 2023–24 Rugby Europe Trophy is the sixth season of the second premier rugby union competition for European national teams outside the Six Nations Championship which itself is a part of the Rugby Europe International Championships. The confirmed teams that are competing include Czechia, Croatia, Lithuania, Sweden, Switzerland and Ukraine.

== Participants ==
Nation	Stadium			Head coach	Captain
Nation	Home stadium	Capacity	Location	Head coach	Captain
Croatia	Stadion Stari plac Stadion NŠC Stjepan Spajić	5,000; 5,000	Split; Zagreb	(New Zealand) Anthony Posa	Nik Jurišić
Czech Republic	Markéta Stadium	10,000	Prague	(Czech Republic) Miroslav Němeček	Dan Hošek
Lithuania	Klaipėda Central Stadium; Šiauliai Rugby Academy Stadium	4,428; 4,000	Klaipėda; Šiauliai	(Lithuania) Gediminas Marcišauskas	Tautvydas Krasauskas
Sweden	Olympiastadion; Östervångsstadion	14,417 n/a	Stockholm; Trelleborg	(England) Alex Laybourne	Sami Paulsson
Switzerland	Stade Municipal Yverdon; Colovray Sports Centre; Centre Sportif des Cherpines	6,600; 7,200; 1,000	Yverdon-les-Bains; Nyon; Plan-les-Ouates	(France) Olivier Nier	Cyril Lin
Ukraine	Makarska City Stadium*; Rugby Club Havirov Stadium*	3,000; 300	Makarska*; Havířov*	(Ukraine) Valerii Kochanov	Oleg Kosariev; Viacheslav Ponomarenko

* Owing to the ongoing Russian invasion of Ukraine, Ukraine's home matches will be played in Croatia and Czech Republic

== Table ==
Champions
Relegated to Conference

Place	Nation	Games				Points			Tries			TBP	LBP	Table points
Place	Nation	Played	Won	Drawn	Lost	For	Against	Diff	For	Against	Diff	TBP	LBP	Table points
1	Switzerland (P)	5	5	0	0	198	64	+134	25	8	+17	2	0	22
2	Sweden	5	4	0	1	145	112	+33	21	13	+8	2	0	18
3	Czech Republic	5	3	0	2	192	153	+39	26	19	+7	2	0	14
4	Croatia	5	2	0	3	130	132	-2	20	10	+1	2	1	11
5	Lithuania	5	1	0	4	103	143	-40	12	20	-8	0	0	4
6	Ukraine	5	0	0	5	61	225	-164	8	33	-25	0	0	0
Source - Points were awarded to the teams as follows: Win – 4 points | Draw – 2 points | At least 3 more tries than opponent – 1 point | Loss within 7 points – 1 point | Completing a Grand Slam – 1 point (P) - promoted to 2025 Rugby Europe Championship

== Fixtures ==
28 October 2023
14:00 CEST (UTC+2)

Sweden	48–37	Czech Republic
	Report

Stockholm Olympic Stadium, Stockholm
Attendance: 1,400
Referee: Eugeniu Procopi (Moldova)

4 November 2023
13:00 CET (UTC+1)

(1 TBP) Czech Republic	48–22	Croatia
	Report

Markéta Stadium, Prague
Attendance: 1,000
Referee: Adrian Pawlik (Poland)

4 November 2023
14:00 CET (UTC +1)

Ukraine	14–32	Lithuania
	Report

Makarska City Stadium, Makarska
Attendance: 300
Referee: Ethan Glass (Switzerland)

4 November 2023
15:30 CET (UTC+1)

Switzerland	23–12	Sweden
	Report

Stade Municipal, Yverdon-les-Bains
Attendance: n/a
Referee: Killian O'Brien (Germany)

11 November 2023
14:00 EET (UTC+2)

Lithuania	17–31	Switzerland
	Report

Klaipėda Central Stadium, Klaipėda
Attendance: 500
Referee: Sulkhan Chikladze (Georgia)

11 November 2023
14:30 CET (UTC +1)

Ukraine	5–41	Croatia (1 TBP)
	Report

Makarska City Stadium, Makarska
Attendance: 1,000
Referee: Luis Fernandez (Spain)

18 November 2023
14:30 CET (UTC +1)

(1 LBP) Croatia	20–22	Sweden
	Report

Stadion NŠC Stjepan Spajić, Zagreb
Attendance: 1,000
Referee: Lukasz Jasinski (Poland)

25 November 2023
14:00 CET (UTC+1)

Czech Republic	34–24	Lithuania
	Report

Markéta Stadium, Prague
Attendance: 700
Referee: Gert Visser (Netherlands)

9 March 2024
14:00 CET (UTC+1)

Czech Republic	25–41	Switzerland
	Report

Markéta Stadium, Prague
Attendance: 600
Referee: Joshua Ferreira (Germany)

16 March 2024
14:30 CET (UTC+1)

(1 TBP) Croatia	37–22	Lithuania
	Report

Stadion NŠC Stjepan Spajić, Zagreb
Attendance: 300
Referee: Maria Latos (Germany)

23 March 2024
13:00 CET (UTC+1)

Ukraine	18–48	Czech Republic (1 TBP)
	Report

Rugby Club Havirov Stadium, Havířov
Attendance: 1,500
Referee: Mike Hawkins (Denmark)

23 March 2024
14:00 EET (UTC+2)

Lithuania	8–27	Sweden (1 TBP)
	Report

Šiauliai Rugby Academy Stadium, Šiauliai
Attendance: 300
Referee: Pedro Mendes-Silva (Portugal)

23 March 2024
15:30 CET (UTC+1)

(1 TBP) Switzerland	35–10	Croatia
	Report

Stade Municipal, Yverdon-les-Bains
Attendance: 1,518
Referee: Nicola Fratila (Romania)

6 April 2024
14:00 CEST (UTC+2)

(1 TBP) Sweden	36–24	Ukraine
	Report

Östervångsstadion, Trelleborg
Attendance: 1,200
Referee: Gert Visser (Netherlands)

13 April 2024
15:30 CEST (UTC+2)

(1 TBP) Switzerland	68–0	Ukraine
	Report

Utogrund, Zürich
Attendance: 2,500
Referee: Ignacio Munoz Martin (Spain)

== Two-Year overall table ==
Promoted to Championship

Place	Nation	Games				Points			Tries			TBP	LBP	Table points
Place	Nation	Played	Won	Drawn	Lost	For	Against	Diff	For	Against	Diff	TBP	LBP	Table points
1	Switzerland	9	9	0	0	403	136	+267	54	16	+38	5	0	41
2	Sweden	9	6	0	3	227	251	-24	32	32	0	3	0	27
3	Croatia	9	3	0	6	230	65	-35	32	28	-4	2	2	16
4	Czech Republic	5	3	0	2	192	153	+39	26	19	+7	2	0	14
5	Lithuania	9	2	0	7	200	265	-65	25	35	-10	1	2	11
6	Ukraine	9	2	0	7	178	360	-182	23	53	-30	1	0	9
Source - Points were awarded to the teams as follows: Win – 4 points | Draw – 2 points | At least 3 more tries than opponent – 1 point | Loss within 7 points – 1 point | Completing a Grand Slam – 1 point

== See also ==
- Rugby Europe International Championships
- Six Nations Championship
