= 2012–2014 European Nations Cup First Division =

2012–14 European Nations Cup
- Date: 2012–2014
- Countries: Division 1A: Belgium; Georgia; Portugal; Romania; Russia; Spain; Division 1B: Czech Republic; Germany; Moldova; Poland; Sweden; Ukraine

Final positions
- Champions: Georgia (2013, 2014)
- Antim Cup: Georgia (2013, 2014)

Tournament statistics
- Matches played: Division 1A: 30; Division 1B: 30
- Top scorer(s): Division 1A: (Romania) Florin Vlaicu (58); Division 1B: (Ukraine) Oleg Kosariev (30)
- Most tries: Division 1A: (Portugal) Gonçalo Foro (Russia) Igor Klyuchnikov (Georgia (country)) Tedore Zibzibadze (2); Division 1B: (Sweden) Ian Gowland (3)

The 2012–14 European Nations Cup First Division is the premier rugby union competition below the Six Nations Championship in Europe. It is divided into two tiers; Division 1A and Division 1B.

The divisions play on a two-year cycle with the teams playing each other both home and away. From 2009 onward, the title is awarded according to a one-year ranking.

The competition has been slightly altered for the 2012–14 edition. The top tier Division 1A has seen the relegation of Ukraine to Division 1B. They have been replaced with Belgium, who finished at the top of Division 1B in the 2010–12 season. The bottom tier division 1B has seen the relegation of the Netherlands to the European Nations Cup Second Division. They have been replaced by Sweden who won promotion from Division 2A.

The champions of 1B will be promoted to Division 1A for the 2015–16 season, while the last placed team in each division will be relegated.

== 2015 Rugby World Cup qualifying ==
As with the 2008–2010 tournament, this edition will also serve a role in the qualification process for the 2015 Rugby World Cup.

The top two teams at the end of the overall ENC Division 1A 2013–14 tournament will qualify directly for the 2015 Rugby World Cup. The third placed team will enter a playoff series against the champions of Division 1B and the leaders of the four levels of the ENC Second Division as of the end of the 2012–2013 season. The winner of this playoff will advance to the repechage playoff against teams from other continents.

== Format ==
Table points are determined as follows:

- 4 points for a win
- 2 points for a draw
- 0 point for a loss
- 1 bonus point for scoring 4 tries in a match
- 1 bonus point for losing by 7 points or fewer

== Division 1A ==
=== 2013 ===
==== Table ====
ENC 2013 champions

Place	Nation	Games					Points			Table points
Place	Nation	Played	Won	Drawn	Lost	Bonus	For	Against	Diff	Table points
1	Georgia (17)	5	4	1	0	1	135	61	+74	19
2	Romania (19)	5	4	1	0	1	114	65	+49	19
3	Russia (20)	5	3	0	2	2	110	116	−6	14
4	Portugal (22)	5	1	1	3	1	75	96	−21	7
5	Belgium (21)	5	0	1	4	3	92	131	−39	5
6	Spain (18)	5	0	2	3	1	72	129	−57	5

Pre-tournament IRB rankings in parentheses

==== Games ====
2 February 2013

Portugal	13–19	Romania
Try: Julien Bardy 63'; Con: Pedro Leal; Pen: Pedro Leal (2) 24', 69'	Team Sheet	Try: Eugen Căpăţână 75'; Con: Florin Vlaicu; Pen: Florin Vlaicu (4) 5', 29', 35', 51'

Estádio Universitário de Lisboa, Lisbon
Attendance: 3,000
Referee: Neil Hennessy (Wales)

2 February 2013

Russia	13–9	Spain
Try: Mikhail Babaev 11'; Con: Igor Klyuchnikov (1/1); Pen: Igor Klyuchnikov (2) 59', 71'	Team Sheet	Pen: Jaime Nava de Olano 14'; Drop: Jaime Nava de Olano (2) 45', 54'

Slava Metreveli Central Stadium, Sochi
Attendance: 400
Referee: David Willinson (Ireland)

2 February 2013

Belgium	13–17	Georgia
Try: Alain Miriallakis 25'; Con: Alan Williams; Pen: Alan Williams (2) 39', 43'	Team Sheet	Try: Mamuka Gorgodze 50'; Levan Chilachava 71'; Con: Merab Kvirikashvili (2/2); Pen: Merab Kvirkashvili 27'

King Baudouin Stadium, Brussels
Referee: Matteo Liperini (Italy)

9 February 2013

Georgia	25–12	Portugal
Try: Lasha Khmaladze 3'; Tedore Zibzibadze (2) 64', 79'; Con: Merab Kvirikashvili (2); Pen: Merab Kvirikashvili (2) 59', 72'	Team Sheet	Pen: Pedro Leal (4) 8', 55' 60', 70'

Mikheil Meskhi Stadium, Tbilisi
Referee: Gia Amirkhanashvili (Georgia)

9 February 2013

Romania	29–14	Russia
Try: Robert Dascălu 58'; Florin Vlaicu 79'; Con: Florin Vlaicu (2); Pen: Florin Vlaicu (5) 7', 38', 44', 71', 75'	Team Sheet	Try: Dmitry Gerasimov 15'; Pen: Igor Klyuchnikov (3) 13', 40', 71'

Stadionul Arcul de Triumf, Bucharest
Attendance: 2,500
Referee: Luke Pearce (England)

9 February 2013

Belgium	21–21	Spain
Try: Julien Berger 23'; Guillaume Piron 50'; Con: Alan Williams; Pen: Alan Williams (3) 1', 7', 75'	Team Sheet	Try: Matías Tudela Perret 4'; Jaike Carter 71'; Con: Corey Smith; Pen: Corey Smith (3) 38', 57', 64'

King Baudouin Stadium, Brussels
Referee: Stephan Pomarede (France)

23 February 2013

Russia	9–23	Georgia
Pen: Igor Klyuchnikov (2) 6', 66'; Sergey Sugrobov 76'		Try: Viktor Kolelishvili 60'; Davit Kubriashvili 80'; Con: Merab Kvirikashvili (2) 60', 80'; Pen: Merab Kvirikashvili (3) 11', 25', 71'

Slava Metreveli Central Stadium, Sochi
Referee: Laurent Cardona (France)

23 February 2013

Spain	15–25	Romania
Try: Lionel Pardo 46'; César Sempere 78'; Con: Corey Simpson 46'; Pen: Corey Simpson 19'	Team Sheet	Try: Cătălin Fercu 22'; Con: Florin Vlaicu 22'; Pen: Florin Vlaicu (6) 6', 12', 17', 29', 49', 67'

Las Mestas, Gijón
Attendance: 4,500
Referee: Giuseppe Vivarini (Italy)

23 February 2013

Portugal	18–12	Belgium
Try: Gonçalo Foro (2) 17', 61'; Con: Pedro Leal 62'; Pen: Pedro Leal (2) 6', 76'		Pen: Alan Williams (4) 4', 8', 40', 70'

Lisbon
Referee: Vlad Iordăchescu (Romania)

9 March 2013

Georgia	61–18	Spain
Try: Dimitri Basilaia (2) 22', 63'; Merab Sharikadze 26'; Lasha Khmaladze 33'; Irakli Machkhaneli 46'; Vasil Kakovin 49'; Tamaz Mchedlidze (2) 69', 79'; Con: Merab Kvirikashvili (4); Beka Tsiklauri (2); Pen: Merab Kvirikashvili (3) 8', 21', 31'	Team Sheet	Try: Matías Tudela Perret 57'; Jaike Christian Carter 67'; Con: Corey Noel Simpson

Mikheil Meskhi Stadium, Tbilisi
Referee: Stuart Gaffikin (Ireland)

9 March 2013

Portugal	23–31	Russia
Try: Aderito Esteves 55'; Pen: Pedro Leal (3) 4', 17', 32'; Samuel Marques (3) 21', 30', 38'	Team Sheet	Try: Vladimir Ostroushko 22'; Kirill Kulemin 45'; Andrey Temnov 48'; Vasily Artemyev 65'; Con: Sergey Yanyushkin (3); Sergey Sugrobov; Pen: Sergey Yanyushkin 8'

Estádio Universitário de Lisboa, Lisbon
Referee: J. P. Matheu (France)

9 March 2013

Belgium	14–32	Romania
Try: Thomas Demolder 64'; Pen: Alan Williams (3) 2', 29', 39'	Team Sheet	Try: Andrei Radoi 3'; Penalty try 35'; Mihai Macovei 41'; Ionut Dimofte 55'; Con: Florian Vlaicu (3); Pen: Florian Vlaicu 14'; Ionut Dimofte 71'

King Baudouin Stadium, Brussels
Referee: Andy Ireland (Scotland)

16 March 2013

Romania	9–9	Georgia
Pen: Florian Vlaicu (3) 15', 20' 52'	Team Sheet	Pen: Merab Kvirikashvili (3) 7', 30', 44'

Stadionul Arcul de Triumf, Bucharest
Referee: Ian Davies (Wales)

16 March 2013

Spain	9–9	Portugal
Pen: Corey Simpson (2) 10', 80'; Jaime Nava Olana 16'	Team Sheet	Pen: Pedro Leal (2) 46', 69'; Samuel Marques 62'

Estadio San Lázaro, Santiago de Compostela
Attendance: 3,500
Referee: Cedric Marchat (France)

16 March 2013

Russia	43–32	Belgium
Try: Victor Gresev 7'; Kirill Kulemin (2) 21', 66'; Penalty try 36'; Dmitry Gerasimov 48'; Andrey Temnov 53'; Grigory Tsnobiladze 80+3'; Con: Igor Klyuchnikov (4)	Team Sheet	Try: Alain Miriallakis 17'; Cyril Nana 62'; Julien Berger 69'; Penalty try 80'; Con: Carlos Fierro (3); Pen: Carlos Fierro (2) 11', 38'

Sochi Central Stadium, Sochi
Referee: Claudio Blessano (Italy)

=== 2014 ===
==== Table ====
ENC 2014 champions

Place	Nation	Games					Points			Table points
Place	Nation	Played	Won	Drawn	Lost	Bonus	For	Against	Diff	Table points
1	Georgia	5	5	0	0	2	151	45	+106	22
2	Romania	5	4	0	1	3	128	41	+87	19
3	Russia	5	3	0	2	2	109	133	−24	14
4	Spain	5	2	0	3	2	87	114	−27	10
5	Portugal	5	1	0	4	1	70	126	−56	5
6	Belgium	5	0	0	5	1	42	128	−86	1

==== Games ====
1 February 2014

Romania	24–0	Portugal
Try: Rădoi, Gal; Con: Vlaicu (1); Pen: Vlaicu (4)

Cluj Arena, Cluj
Attendance: 5,000

1 February 2014

Spain	25–28	Russia

Madrid

1 February 2014

Georgia	35–0	Belgium

Tbilisi

8 February 2014

Portugal	9–34	Georgia

Lisbon

8 February 2014

Russia	3–34	Romania
Pen: Kushnarev		Try: Burcea, Lucaci, Dumitru, Manole; Con: Vlaicu (3), Calafeteanu; Pen: Vlaicu (2)

Nebug

8 February 2014

Spain	11–6	Belgium

Madrid

22 February 2014

Georgia	36–10	Russia

Dinamo Arena, Tbilisi
Attendance: 54,000

22 February 2014

Romania	32–6	Spain
Try: I.Dumitru (2), V. Calafeteanu, Penalty try Con: F. Vlaicu (3); Pen: F. Vlaicu (2)		Pen: Malie (2)

Cluj Arena, Cluj
Attendance: 6,000

22 February 2014

Belgium	6–19	Portugal
Pen: Alan Williams (2)		Try: Gonçalo Uva, Carl Murray; Pen: Pedro Avila (3)

Brussels

8 March 2014

Spain	17–24	Georgia
	Team sheet

Madrid

8 March 2014

Russia	34–18	Portugal
	Team sheet

Sochi

8 March 2014

Romania	29–10	Belgium

Constanța

15 March 2014

Georgia	22–9	Romania

Mikheil Meskhi Stadium, Tbilisi
Attendance: 25,517
Referee: Luke Pearce (England)

15 March 2014

Portugal	24–28	Spain
	Team sheet

Lisbon

15 March 2014

Belgium	20–34	Russia

Brussels

=== Table 2013–2014 ===
Relegated to Division 1B

Place	Nation	Games				Points			Bonus points	Table points
Place	Nation	Played	Won	Drawn	Lost	For	Against	Diff	Bonus points	Table points
1	Georgia	10	9	1	0	286	106	+180	3	41
2	Romania	10	8	1	1	242	106	+136	4	38
3	Russia	10	6	0	4	219	249	−30	4	28
4	Spain	10	2	2	6	159	243	−84	3	15
5	Portugal	10	2	1	7	145	222	−77	2	12
6	Belgium	10	0	1	9	134	259	−125	4	6
Points were awarded to the teams as follows: Win – 4 points Draw – 2 points 4 or more tries – 1 point Loss within 7 points – 1 point Loss greater than 7 points – 0 points

== Division 1B ==
=== 2012–13 ===
==== Table ====
2013 champions

Place	Nation	Games				Points			Bonus points	Table points
Place	Nation	Played	Won	Drawn	Lost	For	Against	Difference	Bonus points	Table points
1	Germany (31)	5	4	0	1	191	89	+102	4	20
2	Moldova (34)	5	3	0	2	119	136	−17	3	15
3	Poland (28)	5	3	0	2	95	71	+24	1	13
4	Sweden (38)	5	3	0	2	122	130	−8	1	13
5	Ukraine (30)	5	2	0	3	122	122	0	2	10
6	Czech Republic (40)	5	0	0	5	56	157	−101	1	1

Pre-tournament rankings in parentheses

==== Games ====
6 October 2012

Czech Republic	3–29	Poland
Drop: Petr Čížek 8'	Report	Try: Romuald Berthe 23'; Alexandre Beccuau 28'; Con: David Chartier (2); Pen: David Chartier (5) 3', 6', 20', 34', 40'

Fiat Arena - Stadion Josefa Kohouta, Říčany
Referee: J. P. Matheu (France)

20 October 2012

Sweden	10–22	Ukraine
Try: Robin Fransson 64'; Con: Dustin Eaton; Pen: Robin Fransson 20'	Report	Try: Oleksandr Lomakin 42'; Con: Oleg Kosariev; Pen: Oleg Kosariev (5) 8', 15' 28' 40', 47'

Stockholm
Attendance: 750
Referee: Pedro Murinello (Portugal)

27 October 2012

Sweden	54–6	Moldova
Try: Thomas Arvidsson (2) 14', 80'; Ian Gowland (3) 61', 68', 78'; Lee Sandberg 73'; Simon Pierce 75'; Con: Robin Fransson (5); Pen: Robin Fransson (3) 34', 40+1', 65'	Report	Pen: Mihai Golubenco (2) 21', 47'

Stockholm
Referee: Igotz Gallastegi (Spain)

27 October 2012

Germany	46–28	Ukraine
Try: Sean Armstrong 7'; Manuel Wilhelm 14'; Robert May (2) 21', 68'; Benjamin Simm 56'; Raynor Parkinson 78'; Con: Raynor Parkinson (5); Pen: Raynor Parkinson (2) 34', 52'	Report	Try: Oleg Lytvynenko 24'; Oleg Kosariev 35'; Serhii Sukhikh 47'; Vladyslav Hrabovskyy 63'; Con: Oleg Kosariev (4)

Sportsclub Siemensstadt, Berlin
Attendance: 1,100
Referee: Robert Diaconescu (Romania)

3 November 2012

Poland	22–13	Germany
Try: Michał Krużycki 32'; Con: David Chartier; Pen: David Chartier (5) 50', 66', 74', 79', 80+2'	Report	Try: Sean Armstrong 20'; Con: Raynor Parkinson; Pen: Raynor Parkinson (2) 58', 80'

Gdańsk
Referee: Pikovkhin (Russia)

10 November 2012

Czech Republic	18–22	Sweden
Try: Vojtěch Havel 3'; Vojtěch Mára 9'; Con: Petr Čížek; Pen: Petr Čížek 36'; Martin Schneider 68'	Report	Try: Robin Fransson 6'; Con: Robin Fransson; Pen: Robin Fransson (2) 19', 44'; Dustin Eaton (3) 70', 72', 79'

Stadion RC Tatra Smíchov, Prague
Referee: Ken Lambrechts (Belgium)

17 November 2012

Germany	32–14	Moldova
Try: Kehoma Brenner 19'; Kieran Manawatu (2) 22', 68'; Damien Tussac 31'; Con: Raynor Parkinson (3); Pen: Raynor Parkinson (2) 44', 52'	Report	Try: Andrei Romanov 46'; Maxim Cobilas 61'; Con: Mihai Golubenco (2)

Fritz-Grunebaum-Sportpark, Heidelberg
Referee: Claudio Blessano (Italy)

17 November 2012

Ukraine	42–15	Czech Republic
Try: Oleksyi Novokreshcheno 3'; Ievgen Chalka 51'; Vitalii Krasnodemskyi 79'; Con: Pavlo Masiukov (3); Pen: Pavlo Masiukov (6) 21', 33', 44', 46', 64', 69'; Drop: Sergiy Tserkovniy 60'	Report	Pen: Petr Čížek (5) 6', 13', 40', 54', 57'

Meteor Dnipropetrovsk, Dnipro
Referee: Radu Petrescu (Romania)

9 March 2013

Czech Republic	8–27	Germany
Try: Pavel Vokrouhlík 38'; Pen: Petr Čížek 52'	Report	Try: Pieter Jordaan (2) 7', 36'; Sean Armstrong 42'; Marten Strauch 49'; Con: Raynor Parkinson (2); Pen: Raynor Parkinson 47'

Prague
Attendance: 500
Referee: Vlad Iordachescu (Romania)

16 March 2013

Moldova	37–12	Czech Republic
Try: Victor Arhip 9'; Dumitru Vasilachi 12'; Veaceslav Titica (3) 42', 52', 64'; Sergiu Castravet 57' unknown 78'; Con: Mihai Golubenco	Report	Try: Lukáš Macháček 11'; Michal Jirman 80+1'; Con: Václav Jursík

Chișinău
Attendance: 2,000
Referee: Andrea Spadoni (Italy)

Goalpost crossbars were fixed at 4m, instead of 3m.

30 March 2013

Poland	13–12	Ukraine
Try: Alexander Beccau 75'; Con: David Chatier; Pen: David Chatier (2) 9', 80+2'	Report	Try: Vitalii Krasnodemskyi 5'; Vitalii Kramarenko 10'; Con: Pavlo Masiukov

Gdynia
Referee: Lloyd Linton (Scotland)

6 April 2013

Germany	73–17	Sweden
Try: Manuel Wilhelm (2) 5', 32'; Alexander Hug 28'; Marten Strauch 34'; Kieran Manawatu 40'; Raynor Parkinson 56'; Clemens von Grumbkow 59'; Lars Eckert 69'; Kehoma Brenner 73'; Robert Mohr 80'; Con: Raynor Parkinson (10); Drop: Raynor Parkinson 65'	Report	Try: Simon Pierce 53'; Ian Gowland 66'; Tim Johansson 78'; Con: Robin Fransson

Hamburg
Attendance: 3,500
Referee: Pedro Montoya (Spain)

7 April 2013

Ukraine	18–38	Moldova
Try: Taras Marchenko 32'; Ruslan Radchuk 73'; Con: Mykola Deliyergiev; Pen: Sergiy Tserkovniy 4'; Mykola Deliyergiev 40'	Report	Try: Dumitru Arhip (2) 13', 27'; Vadim Cobilas 17'; Veaceslav Titica 53'; Alexandru Bulgac 56'; Stefan Leca 79'; Con: Octavian Manoli (4)

Odesa
Attendance: 4,500
Referee: Radu Petrescu (Romania)

13 April 2013

Moldova	24–20	Poland
Try: Maxim Cobilas 15'; Dumitru Arhip 34'; Nicolae Chirila 53'; Oleg Prepelita 71'; Con: Octavian Manoli (2)	Report	Try: Alexander Beccau 29'; Krzysztof Hotowski 66'; Con: David Chatier (2); Pen: David Chatier (2)

Chișinău

1 June 2013

Sweden	19–11	Poland

Stockholm

=== Season 2013–14 ===
2014 champions

Place	Nation	Games					Points			Table points
Place	Nation	Played	Won	Drawn	Lost	Bonus	For	Against	Difference	Table points
1	Germany	5	4	0	1	3	207	91	+116	19
2	Moldova	5	4	0	1	3	148	92	+56	19
3	Ukraine	5	3	0	2	2	105	105	0	14
4	Czech Republic	5	2	0	3	2	86	153	−67	10
5	Poland	5	2	0	3	1	113	112	+1	9
6	Sweden	5	0	0	5	0	71	177	−106	1

==== Games ====
7 September 2013

Poland	30–9	Sweden
Try: Mateusz Bartoszek 9'; Lukasz Szostek 39'; Szymon Sirocki 80'; Con: Dawid Banaszek (3) 9', 39', 80'; Pen: Dawid Banaszek (3) 25', 68', 72'	Report	Pen: Robin Fransson (3) 28', 33', 58'

Stadion Polonii, Warsaw
Referee: Maxime Burlet (Belgium)

12 October 2013

Poland	30–10	Czech Republic
Try: Robert Pawelec 68'; Michal Kruzycki 70'; Con: Dawid Banaszek 70'; Pen: Dawid Banaszek (5) 4', 16', 39', 53', 60'; Tomasz Gasik 27'		Try: Robert Voves 65'; Con: Petr Cizek 65'; Pen: Petr Cizek 40'

Stadion Polonii, Warsaw
Attendance: 4,500
Referee: Frank Himmer (Germany)

19 October 2013

Sweden	11–17	Czech Republic

Stockholm

26 October 2013

Ukraine	16–28	Germany
Try: Vyacheslav Ponomarenko 54'; Sergiy Tserkovniy 65'; Pen: Maksym Tyurikov (2) 12', 29'	Report	Try: Pieter Jordaan 20'; Mark Sztyndera (2) 25', 72'; Con: Raynor Parkinson (2) 21', 72'; Pen: Raynor Parkinson (3) 9', 58', 63'

Kharkiv
Referee: Vlad Iordăchescu (Romania)

2 November 2013

Ukraine	35–11	Sweden
Try: Oleg Kosariev (2) 14', 19'; Mykola Aleksandriuk 25'; Denys Masiukov 37'; Viachesl Krasylnyk 70'; Con: Oleg Kosariev (5) 15', 20', 26', 38', 71'	Report	Try: Andrew Daish 78'; Pen: Niklas Ståhle (2) 28', 35'

Kyiv
Attendance: 2,000
Referee: Radu Petrescu (Romania)

9 November 2013

Moldova	50–20	Sweden

Chișinău

9 November 2013

Germany	43–13	Poland
Try: Widiker (2) 16' m, 32' m Parkinson 24' c Jordaan 38' c Szczesny 52' c Nostadt 67' c Mai 74' m Con: Parkinson (4/7)		Try: Gask 80' c Con: Banaszek (1/1); Pen: Banaszek (2) 2', 9'

Berlin

16 November 2013

Moldova	30–15	Germany

Chișinău

16 November 2013

Czech Republic	10–17	Ukraine

Zlín

5 April 2014

Germany	76–12	Czech Republic

Heidelberg

5 April 2014

Poland	12–21	Moldova

Warsaw

12 April 2014

Moldova	28–8	Ukraine

Chișinău

26 April 2014

Czech Republic	37–19	Moldova

Prague
Attendance: 800

26 April 2014

Sweden	20–45	Germany

Stockholm

26 April 2014

Ukraine	29–28	Poland

Lviv

=== Table 2012–2014 ===
Promoted to Division 1A
Relegated to Division 2A

Place	Nation	Games					Points			Table points
Place	Nation	Played	Won	Drawn	Lost	Bonus	For	Against	Diff	Table points
1	Germany	10	8	0	2	7	398	180	+218	39
2	Moldova	10	7	0	3	6	267	228	+39	34
3	Ukraine	10	5	0	5	4	227	227	0	24
4	Poland	10	5	0	5	2	208	183	+25	22
5	Sweden	10	3	0	7	2	193	307	−114	14
6	Czech Republic	10	2	0	8	3	142	310	−168	11

== See also ==
- European Nations Cup (rugby union)
- Rugby Europe
- Six Nations Championship
- Antim Cup
- 2015 Rugby World Cup qualifying
