= 2022–23 Rugby Europe Trophy =

- Date: 22 October 2022 - 1 April 2023
- Countries: Croatia; Lithuania; Sweden; Switzerland; Ukraine

Tournament statistics
- Champions: Switzerland (1st title)
- Matches played: 10
- Attendance: 7,700 (770 per match)
- Tries scored: 80 (8 per match)

The 2022–23 Rugby Europe Trophy is the sixth season of the second premier rugby union competition for European national teams outside the Six Nations Championship which itself is a part of the Rugby Europe International Championships. The confirmed teams that are competing include Croatia, Lithuania, Sweden, Switzerland and Ukraine.

== Participants ==
Nation	Stadium			Head coach	Captain
Nation	Home stadium	Capacity	Location	Head coach	Captain
Croatia	Stari plac Stadion NŠC Stjepan Spajić	5,000; 5,000	Split; Zagreb	(New Zealand) Anthony Posa	Nik Jurišić
Lithuania	Šiauliai Rugby Academy Stadium	4,000	Šiauliai	(Lithuania) Gediminas Marcišauskas	Tautvydas Krasauskas
Sweden	Malmö Stadion; Olympiastadion	26,500; 14,417	Malmö; Stockholm	(England) Alex Laybourne	Sami Paulsson
Switzerland	Stade Municipal Yverdon; Colovray Sports Centre; Centre Sportif des Cherpines	6,600; 7,200; 1,000	Yverdon-les-Bains; Nyon; Plan-les-Ouates	(France) Olivier Nier	Cyril Lin
Ukraine	Stari plac*	5,000	Split*	(Ukraine) Valerii Kochanov	Oleh Kosariev; Viacheslav Ponomarenko

* Owing to the ongoing Russian invasion, Ukraine's home matches were played in Croatia

== Table ==
Champions

Place	Nation	Games				Points			Tries			TBP	LBP	Table points
Place	Nation	Played	Won	Drawn	Lost	For	Against	Diff	For	Against	Diff	TBP	LBP	Table points
1	Switzerland	4	4	0	0	205	72	+133	29	8	+21	3	0	19
2	Ukraine	4	2	0	2	117	135	-18	15	20	-5	1	0	9
3	Sweden	4	2	0	2	82	139	-57	11	19	-8	1	0	9
4	Lithuania	4	1	0	3	97	122	-25	13	15	-2	1	2	7
5	Croatia	4	1	0	3	100	133	-33	12	18	-4	0	1	5
Source - Points were awarded to the teams as follows: Win – 4 points | Draw – 2 points | At least 3 more tries than opponent – 1 point | Loss within 7 points – 1 point | Completing a Grand Slam – 1 point

== Fixtures ==
22 October 2022
14:15 CEST (UTC +2)

(1 LBP) Croatia	22–27	Ukraine
	Report

Stadion NŠC Stjepan Spajić, Zagreb
Attendance: 650
Referee: Pedro Mendes-Silva (Portugal)

29 October 2022
14:00 CEST (UTC +2)

(1TBP) Sweden	37–17	Croatia
	Report

Olympiastadion, Stockholm
Attendance: 1,500
Referee: Eugeniu Procopi (Moldova)

5 November 2022
14:00 EET (UTC+2)

(1 TBP) Lithuania	39–20	Ukraine
	Report

Šiauliai Rugby Academy Stadium, Šiauliai
Attendance: 700
Referee: Sulkhan Chikladze (Georgia)

5 November 2022
14:00 CET (UTC +1)

Sweden	12–69	Switzerland (1 TBP)
	Report

Malmö Stadion, Malmö
Attendance: 200
Referee: Ignacio Munoz-Martin (Spain)

12 November 2022
15:00 CET (UTC +1)

(1 TBP) Switzerland	45–6	Lithuania
	Report

Stade Juan Antonio Samaranch, Lausanne
Attendance: 650
Referee: John Catteau (Belgium)

11 March 2023
14:00 CET (UTC +1)

Ukraine	32–59	Switzerland (1 TBP)
	Report

Stadion NŠC Stjepan Spajić, Zagreb
Attendance: 150
Referee: Anthony Lac (Monaco)

18 March 2023
15:30 CET (UTC +1)

(1 TBP) Ukraine	38–15	Sweden
	Report

Stari plac, Split
Attendance: 250
Referee: Kevin Sulejmani (Belgium)

25 March 2023
14:00 EET (UTC +2)

(1 LBP) Lithuania	37–39	Croatia
	Report

Šiauliai Rugby Academy Stadium, Šiauliai
Attendance: 600
Referee: Ignacio Munoz-Martin (Spain)

1 April 2023
14:00 EEST (UTC +3)

(1 LBP) Lithuania	15–18 (Note: Fixture reversed due to the Swedish RFU having no stadium available)	Sweden
	Report

Regbio stadionas, Šiauliai
Attendance: n/a
Referee: Lukasz Jasinski (Poland)

1 April 2023
16:00 CEST (UTC +2)

Croatia	22–32	Switzerland
	Report

Gradski sportski centar, Makarska
Attendance: 3,000
Referee: Killian O'Brien (Germany)

== See also ==
- Rugby Europe International Championships
- Six Nations Championship
