= Nordic Cup =

Nordic Cup may refer to:

- Alpine Nordic Cup, circuit of alpine skiing competitions in the Nordic countries
- Nordic Cup (1994), a football competition for national teams from the Nordic countries staged during summer 1994
- Nordic Cup (football), 1959–62 club competition for Nordic countries football clubs
- Nordic Cup (rugby league), rugby league competition for national teams from the Nordic countries
- Nordic Cup (women's football), a football competition for women's under-23 national teams from the Nordic countries and invited teams
- Nordic Cup for Juniors, a youth football competition for national teams from the Nordic countries and invited teams
- Nordic Futsal Cup, a futsal competition for national teams from the Nordic countries
- Rugby Nordic Cup, club competition for Nordic countries rugby union teams
