= Tobias Christensen =

Tobias Christensen may refer to:

- Tobias Christensen (footballer, born 1995), Danish footballer who plays for Vendsyssel FF
- Tobias Christensen (footballer, born 2000), Norwegian footballer who plays for Wieczysta Kraków
