= 1991 Rugby World Cup – European qualification =

Tournament details
- Dates: 30 April 1989 – 7 October 1990
- No. of nations: 14

In 1989–1990, 14 European teams competed for the two available positions in the 1991 Rugby World Cup.

== Preliminary ==
=== Pool 1 ===
(played in France)

Team	Played	Won	Drawn	Lost	For	Against	Difference	Points
Sweden	3	3	0	0	98	25	+63	9
Denmark	3	2	0	1	42	57	-15	7
Switzerland	3	1	0	2	49	74	-25	5
Israel	3	0	0	3	31	64	-33	3

30 April 1989

Israel	15 - 22	Switzerland

Chinon

30 April 1989

Denmark	0 - 39	Sweden

Chinon

2 May 1989

Denmark	26 - 12	Switzerland

Tours

2 May 1989

Israel	10 - 26	Sweden

Tours

4 May 1989

Sweden	33 - 15	Switzerland

Loches

4 May 1989

Denmark	16 - 6	Israel

Tours

=== Pool 2 ===
- Round 1

9 September 1989

Czechoslovakia	23 - 6	Yugoslavia

Vyškov

- Round 2

17 September 1989

West Germany	6 - 12	Netherlands

Heidelberg

1 October 1989

Czechoslovakia	13 - 15	Portugal

Říčany

- Round 3

8 October 1989

Netherlands	32 - 3	Portugal

Metz

=== Preliminary final ===
15 October 1989

Netherlands	24 - 3	Sweden

Copenhagen

== Round 2 ==
Final Standings

Team	Played	Won	Drawn	Lost	For	Against	Difference	Points
Spain	3	3	0	0	110	30	+80	9
Netherlands	3	2	0	1	80	68	+12	7
Poland	3	1	0	2	61	79	-18	5
Belgium	3	0	0	3	41	115	-74	3

29 October 1989

Spain	29 - 15	Netherlands

Ciudad Universitaria, Madrid

29 October 1989

Belgium	23 - 25	Poland

Ciudad Universitaria, Madrid

1 November 1989

Spain	23 - 9	Poland

Ciudad Universitaria, Madrid

1 November 1989

Belgium	12 - 32	Netherlands

Ciudad Universitaria, Madrid

5 November 1989

Spain	58 - 6	Belgium

Ciudad Universitaria, Madrid

5 November 1989

Netherlands	33 - 27	Poland

Ciudad Universitaria, Madrid

== Round 3 ==
Final Standings

Team	Played	Won	Drawn	Lost	For	Against	Difference	Points
Italy	3	3	0	0	83	38	+45	9
Romania	3	2	0	1	85	42	+43	7
Spain	3	1	0	2	34	61	-27	5
Netherlands	3	0	0	3	30	91	-61	3

30 September 1990

Italy	30 - 6	Spain

Stadio Battaglini, Rovigo

30 September 1990

Netherlands	7 - 45	Romania

Monigo, Treviso

3 October 1990

Romania	19 - 6	Spain

Stadio Plebiscito, Padua

3 October 1990

Italy	24 - 11	Netherlands

Monigo, Treviso

7 October 1990

Netherlands	12 - 22	Spain

Stadio Battaglini, Rovigo

7 October 1990

Italy	29 - 21	Romania

Stadio Plebiscito, Padua

Italy and Romania qualified to 1991 Rugby World Cup, Pool 1 and Pool 4, respectively.

== Bibliography ==
- (in Italian) Francesco Volpe, Valerio Vecchiarelli (2000), 2000 Italia in Meta, Storia della nazionale italiana di rugby dagli albori al Sei Nazioni, GS Editore (2000) ISBN 88-87374-40-6.
- (in Italian) Francesco Volpe, Paolo Pacitti (Author), Rugby 2000, GTE Gruppo Editorale (1999).
