= George Strickland =

George Strickland may refer to:

- George Strickland (baseball) (1926–2010), American baseball player and manager
- Sir George Strickland, 7th Baronet (1782–1874), English MP
- George Strickland (politician) (1942–2019), member of the Western Australian Legislative Assembly

== See also ==
- George Strickland Kingston (1807–1880), South Australia surveyor and politician
