= Aalborg RK =

Danish rugby club

- Full name: Aalborg RK
- Nickname: Lynet (Lightning)
- Founded: 1964
- Location: Aalborg, Denmark
- Chairman: Henrik Bach Nielsen
- Coach: (Scotland) Rory Blackstock
- Captain: Sylvester Ellekær Michaelsen
Team kit

Aalborg RK is a Danish rugby club in Aalborg.

== History ==
The club was founded in 1964.
