= Rugby Nordic Cup =

The title Nordic Cup has been applied to two separate rugby union tournaments:

== Rugby Nordic Cup (club competition) ==
The Rugby Nordic Cup was a pan-Scandinavian club rugby union tournament annually pitching the champions of each Nordic country against each other. It ran for two seasons between 2008 and 2009.

Year	Winner	Score	Runner up
2009	(Norway) Oslo RK	33 - 24	(Finland) Helsinki Warriors
2008	(Sweden) Enköpings	20 - 7	(Norway) Oslo RK

== Rugby Nordic Cup (international tournament) ==
A series of international tournaments entitled Nordic Cup were played between the national sides of Denmark (plus two "A" team entries), Finland, Norway and Sweden between 1987 and 1993. Two editions of an expanded competition featuring Latvia, Poland and Russia, retitled the Baltic Cup, were held in 1994 and 1995. A further one-off tournament, entitled the Viking Tri-Nations, was held in 2011.

=== Results summary ===
	Team	Tournaments	1st	2nd	3rd	4th	5th
1	Sweden	9	8	2	0	1	-
2	Denmark	10	8	7	1	0	0
3	Poland	2	1	0	1	0	0
4	Russia	1	1	0	0	0	0
5	Latvia	1	0	1	0	0	-
6	Norway	10	0	0	7	2	1
7	Finland	4	0	0	1	3	-
8	Denmark A	2	0	0	0	2	-

=== Viking Tri-Nations ===
Year	Format	1st	2nd	3rd
2011	Round Robin	Sweden	Denmark	Norway

=== Baltic Cup ===
Year	Format	1st	2nd	3rd	4th	5th
1995	Knockout + positional playoffs	Russia	Denmark	Poland	Sweden	Norway
1994	Knockout + playoff for 3rd/4th	Poland	Latvia	Denmark	Norway	-

=== Nordic Cup ===
Year	Format	1st	2nd	3rd	4th
1993	Knockout + playoff for 3rd/4th	Denmark	Sweden	Norway	Denmark A
1992	Round robin	Denmark	Sweden	Norway	-
1991	Knockout + playoff for 3rd/4th	Sweden	Denmark	Finland	Norway
1990	Knockout + playoff for 3rd/4th	Sweden	Denmark	Norway	Finland
1989	Knockout + playoff for 3rd/4th	Sweden	Denmark	Norway	Finland
1988	Knockout + playoff for 3rd/4th	Sweden	Denmark	Norway	Denmark A
1987	Knockout + playoff for 3rd/4th	Sweden	Denmark	Norway	Finland
