= Erritsø GIF Rugby =

- Full name: Erritsø GIF Rugby
- Founded: 1984
- Location: Fredericia, Denmark
- Chairman: Kurt Due Petersen
- Coach: Kristoffer Borsheim
- Captain: Jens Olang
Team kit

Erritsø GIF Rugby is a Danish rugby club in the Erritsø suburb of Fredericia. The club forms part of the Erritsø Gymnastik- & Idrætsforening (Gymnastics and Sports Club)

== History ==
The club was founded in 1984.
