= Nik Jurišić =

Croatian rugby union player

- Born: 6 July 1988 (age 38) Zagreb, SR Croatia, SFR
- Height: 189 cm (6 ft 2 in)
- Weight: 98 kg (15 st 6 lb)

Rugby union career
- Position: First five-eighth
Senior career
Years	Team	Apps	(Points)
2006-	HARK Mladost		
International career
Years	Team	Apps	(Points)
2007-	Croatia		

Nik Jurišić (born 6 July 1988) is a Croatian rugby union player of HARK Mladost and national captain player.
