= Stadion NŠC Stjepan Spajić =

Football stadium in Zagreb, Croatia

Coordinates: 45.771201°N 15.971594°E

NŠC Stjepan Spajić
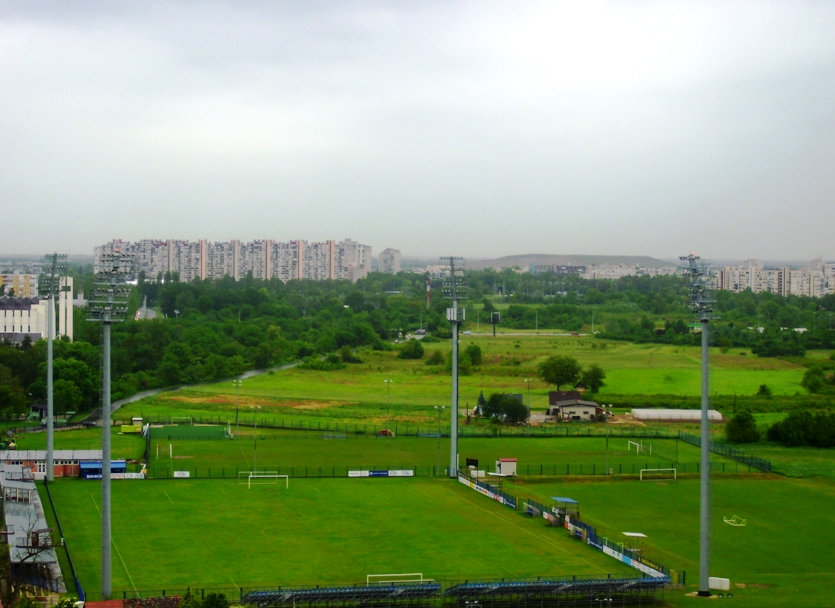
- Aerial view of the stadium
- Interactive map of NŠC Stjepan Spajić
- Full name: Stadion NŠC Stjepan Spajić
- Location: Zagreb, Croatia
- Capacity: 5,000
- Surface: Grass

Construction
- Built: 2000

Tenant
- NK Hrvatski Dragovoljac

Stadion NŠC Stjepan Spajić is a football stadium in the Siget neighborhood of Zagreb, Croatia. It was built in 2000 and serves as home stadium for the NK Hrvatski Dragovoljac football club. The stadium has an all seater capacity of 5,000 spectators. It is named after the late club president Stjepan Spajić.

Stadium was venue of the Rugby Europe Trophy held in Zagreb, in 2018, 2019 and 2021, as well as of the rugby 7s tournament of the 2016 European Universities Games.
