= Romanian Rugby Federation =

Rugby union governing body in Romania

Federația Română de Rugby
- Sport: Rugby union
- Founded: 1913; 112 years ago
- World Rugby affiliation: 1987
- Rugby Europe affiliation: 1934
- President: Alin Petrache
- Men's coach: Eugen Apjok
- Sevens coach: Men's: Florin Vlaicu; Women's: Neculai Tarcan
- Website: rugbyromania.ro

The Romanian Rugby Federation (Romanian: Federația Română de Rugby), abbreviated as FRR, is the governing body for the sport of rugby union in Romania. Romania currently comprises 24,610 players, 9,810 members of which are registered and 113 clubs in the whole country.

== History ==
The Romanian Rugby Federation was founded in 1913, shortly after rugby union was introduced to Romania by French University students who moved to study in Romania and were also one of the founding members of the Fédération Internationale de Rugby Amateur, now known as Rugby Europe.

The federation became affiliated to the International Rugby Football Board, now known as World Rugby, in 1987 when Romania were invited to take part in the inaugural World Cup the same year.

Octavian Morariu was a former president of the FRR, and was considered by many the pioneer in the reconstruction of rugby union in Romania as well as the federation itself. Due to his success, he later became the President of the Romanian Olympic and Sports Committee (COSR) and was replaced by George Straton, one of his closest associates. The current president of FRR is Alin Petrache, another former rugby union player for Romania.

== Presidents ==
Name	Tenure
Grigore Caracostea	1915–1940
Ion Petrescu	1940–1941
Dumitru Tănăsescu	1941–1942
Nicolae Chrissoveloni	1942–1943
Șerban Ghica	1943–1945
Paul Nedelcovici	1945–1946
Grigore Preoteasa	1947
Ascanio Damian	1947–1952
Mihai Nicolau	1952–1953
Emil Drăgănescu	1953–1967
Corneliu Burada	1967–1982
Emil Drăgănescu	1982–1984
Marin Cristea	1984–1989
Emil Ghibu	1989
Mihai Nicolescu	1990–1992
Viorel Morariu	1992–1998
Dumitru Mihalache	1998–2001
Octavian Morariu	2001–2003
George Straton	2003–2009
Alin Petrache	2009–2014
Hari Dumitraș	2014–2017
Alin Petrache	2017–present

== See also ==
- Rugby union in Romania
- Romania national rugby union team
- List of Romania national rugby union players
- Sport in Romania
