= Pingvin RC =

Pingvin Rugby Club
- Founded: 1962
- Location: Trelleborg, Sweden
- Ground: Trelleborg Rugby Arena
- Chairman: Daniel Sörensen
- Coach: (Fiji) Tomasi Tabua-Tamanivalu
- League: Allsvenskan
Team kit

Pingvin RC is a Swedish rugby club in Trelleborg. They currently play in Allsvenskan.

== History ==
The club was founded in 1962.
