= List of Luxembourg national rugby union players =

== List ==
Note: The Lions number is an indication and subject to change, certain match sheets are currently incomplete due to missing records primarily from Match #21 (Switzerland 1995) and Match #13 (Denmark 1992). Currently for the sake of this list below the Lions number can only be assigned alphabetically on the match sheet prior to the match to those making their selection debut whether someone took the field or not.

Lions Number	Name	Year of debut	Test caps	Try #	Total points	Average points per match	Match Debut (#)	c	p	dp	Last cap	(#)
1	Louis Baccega	1975	3	1	4	1.33	Belgium (1)				Belgium	3
2	Christian Baldi	1975	5				Belgium (1)				Switzerland	5
3	Roy Cattermole	1975	2				Belgium (1)				Switzerland	2
4	Dave Cidale	1975	1				Belgium (1)				Belgium	1
5	Maurice Crosbie	1975	2				Belgium (1)				Switzerland	1
6	Tim Crosby	1975	5				Belgium (1)				Switzerland	5
7	Brian Darke	1975	3				Belgium (1)				Belgium	3
8	Bob Dunnaway	1975	1				Belgium (1)				Belgium	1
9	Mick Emslie	1975	2				Belgium (1)				Switzerland	2
10	Stefano Fraschetti	1975	2				Belgium (1)				Switzerland	2
11	Mick Lowe	1975	5				Belgium (1)				Switzerland	5
12	Franco Mastroddi	1975	11		5	0.45	Belgium (1)	1		1	Yugoslavia	11
13	Richard Peterson	1975	3	1	4	1.33	Belgium (1)				Belgium	3
14	Eric Phillips	1975	5				Belgium (1)				Switzerland	5
15	Bucaebe Razzak	1975	2				Belgium (1)				Switzerland	2
16	Marcello Ridolfi	1975	7				Belgium (1)				Switzerland	15
17	Chritian Schock	1975	2				Belgium (1)				Belgium	3
18	John Smithum	1975	2				Belgium (1)				Belgium	4
19	Henri Verbeke	1975	3				Belgium (1)				Belgium	3
20	Frank Wall	1975	3		3	1	Belgium (1)		1		Belgium	3
21	Roy Worsley	1975	2				Belgium (1)				Switzerland	2
22	Ron Ensweiler	1977	1				Switzerland (2)				Switzerland	2
23	Stuart McKenzie	1977	3				Switzerland (2)				Belgium	4
24	David Moody	1977	1				Switzerland (2)				Switzerland	2
25	John Watson	1977	1				Switzerland (2)				Switzerland	2
26	Ami Amrani	1978	3				Belgium (3)				Switzerland	5
27	Francois Andoche	1978	1				Belgium (3)				Belgium	3
28	Andy Binstead	1978	2				Belgium (3)				Belgium	4
29	Trevor Calder	1978	1				Belgium (3)				Belgium	3
30	Chris Lomax	1978	1				Belgium (3)				Belgium	3
31	Kevin McMillin	1978	1				Belgium (3)				Belgium	3
32	Andy Heath	1979	2				Belgium (4)				Switzerland	5
33	Patrick Lannes	1979	1				Belgium (4)				Belgium	4
34	Mike Lyssejko	1979	2		3	1.5	Belgium (4)		1		Switzerland	5
35	Jean-Marie Magnesse	1979	1				Belgium (4)				Belgium	4
36	Nick Montague	1979	1				Belgium (4)				Belgium	4
37	Stuart Rowlands	1979	1				Belgium (4)				Belgium	4
38	Richard Shand	1979	2				Belgium (4)				Switzerland	5
39	Don Smith	1979	2	2	8	4	Belgium (4)				Switzerland	5
40	Martin Abel	1980	1				Switzerland (5)				Switzerland	5
41	Joe Amabile	1980	1				Switzerland (5)				Switzerland	5
42	Gilbert Courades	1980	1				Switzerland (5)				Switzerland	5
43	Ian Drummond	1980	1				Switzerland (5)				Switzerland	5
44	Steve Mills	1980	1				Switzerland (5)				Switzerland	5
45	! Philpott	1980	1				Switzerland (5)				Switzerland	5
46	Francois Vainker	1980	1				Switzerland (5)				Switzerland	5
47	Ian Bonallo	1987	2				Andorra (6)				Bulgaria	7
48	Ben Bowan	1987	1				Andorra (6)				Andorra	6
49	Andy Browne	1987	9	1	9	1	Andorra (6)	1	1		Georgia	16
50	Charles Courlander	1987	5	1	4	0.8	Andorra (6)				Israel	25
51	Massimo Ferrari	1987	13				Andorra (6)				Bermuda	23
52	David Hatfield	1987	1				Andorra (6)				Andorra	6
53	Patrick Hutchines	1987	4		6	1.5	Andorra (6)		2		Bulgaria	9
54	Eric Kuhn	1987	2				Andorra (6)				Bulgaria	14
55	Andy Laughton	1987	1				Andorra (6)				Andorra	6
56	Mark McKeown	1987	10	1	11	1.1	Andorra (6)		2		Switzerland	15
57	Tony Miles	1987	6				Andorra (6)				Yugoslavia	11
58	Graham Paul	1987	21				Andorra (6)				Sweden	30
59	Rob Roger	1987	1				Andorra (6)				Andorra	6
60	Neil Rowlandson	1987	1				Andorra (6)				Andorra	6
61	Tony Savage	1987	6				Andorra (6)				Yugoslavia	11
62	Chris Schram	1987	2				Andorra (6)				Bulgaria	9
63	John Shoesmith	1987	1				Andorra (6)				Andorra	6
64	Jean-Louis Veran	1987	9				Andorra (6)				Georgia	16
65	Mike West	1987	4				Andorra (6)				East Germany	12
66	David Winters	1987	2				Andorra (6)				Bulgaria	7
67	Michel Bic	1988	1				Bulgaria (7)				Bulgaria	7
68	Marc Boussoualem	1988	5	1	4	0.8	Bulgaria (7)				Georgia	16
69	Scott Duncan	1988	6	1	4	0.67	Bulgaria (7)				East Germany	12
70	Richard Geoffreys	1988	5				Bulgaria (7)				East Germany	12
71	C Kandel	1988	1				Bulgaria (7)				Bulgaria	7
72	Gordon Mallaby	1988	1				Bulgaria (7)				Bulgaria	7
73	Colin Phipps	1988	7	1	5	0.71	Bulgaria (7)				Switzerland	15
74	Andy Smith	1988	4				Bulgaria (7)				East Germany	12
75	Jonathan Smyth	1988	8				Bulgaria(7)				Latvia	18
76	Nick Webb	1988	1				Bulgaria (7)				Bulgaria	7
77	Marc Brown	1989	2				Andorra (8)				Bulgaria	9
78	Andre Emering	1989	7				Andorra (8)				Georgia	16
79	Alain Gorge	1989	1				Andorra (8)				Andorra	8
80	Carl Hogan	1989	4				Andorra (8)				Yugoslavia	11
81	Jeff Sweetnam	1989	2				Andorra (8)				Bulgaria	9
82	Ralf Theune	1989	5	1	4	0.8	Andorra (8)				East Germany	12
83	Jeff Damron	1990	2				Andorra (10)				East Germany	12
84	Andy Deutschmann	1990	3				Andorra (10)				East Germany	12
85	Ray Fitzpatrick	1990	1				Andorra (10)				Andorra	10
86	Ewan Grant	1990	2				Andorra (10)				Yugoslavia	11
87	Steve McKeown	1990	3				Andorra (10)				East Germany	12
88	Wolfgang Pirsch	1990	1				Yugoslavia (11)				Yugoslavia	11
89	Paul Chilcott	1990	1				East Germany (12)				East Germany	12
90	Mark Gillies	1990	10	2	9	0.9	East Germany (12)				Lithuania	52
91	Ken Hall	1990	1				East Germany (12)				East Germany	12
92	Ray Linsay	1990	3				East Germany (12)				Switzerland	15
93	John Sutherland	1990	8	3	14	1.75	East Germany (12)				Bosnia and Herzegovina	49
94	Gilles Caviglia	1992	37	5	288	7.78	Denmark (13)	43	57	2	Cyprus	85
95	Bart D'Ancona	1992	9				Denmark (13)				Israel	48
96	Mark Phillips	1992	8				Denmark (13)				Israel	25
97	Christophe Carre	1993	16				Bulgaria (14)				Lithuania	52
98	Marc DeWindt	1993	5				Bulgaria (14)				Bosnia and Herzegovina	32
99	Steve Egan	1993	2				Bulgaria (14)				Switzerland	15
100	Tom Eischen	1993	17				Bulgaria (14)				Bosnia and Herzegovina	63
101	Eduardo Perez	1993	2				Bulgaria (14)				Switzerland	15
102	Alastair Richardson	1993	2				Bulgaria (14)				Switzerland	15
103	Robert Shearer	1993	7				Bulgaria (14)				Croatia	20
104	Reid Thurlow	1993	1				Bulgaria (14)				Bulgaria	14
105	Ian Unsworth	1993	2				Bulgaria (14)				Switzerland	15
106	! Sefton	1993	1				Switzerland (15)				Switzerland	15
107	Peter Whitten	1993	17	3	15	0.88	Switzerland (15)				Tunisia	36
108	Phill Williams	1993	11				Switzerland (15)				Hungary	28
109	Allister Browne	1993	1				Georgia (16)				Georgia	16
110	Graham Cope	1993	11	1	61	5.54	Georgia (16)	4	16		Hungary	28
111	Nicolas Edwards	1993	24	2	10	0.42	Georgia (16)				Bosnia and Herzegovina	46
112	Bill Gourlay	1993	11				Georgia (16)				Hungary	28
113	Fred Greg-Hill	1993	5	1	5	1	Georgia (16)				Croatia	20
114	Ange Guilloteau	1993	3				Georgia (16)				Latvia	18
115	Jason Jenkins	1993	14	1	5	0.36	Georgia (16)				Sweden	30
116	Guy Maslin	1993	1				Georgia (16)				Georgia	16
117	Ray Schaeler	1993	5				Georgia (16)				Croatia	24
118	Tony Whiteman	1993	19		27	1.42	Georgia (16)	6	5		Finland	73
119	Richard Cuerton-Taylor	1994	2				Switzerland (17)				Latvia	18
120	Arwel Hughes	1994	16				Switzerland (17)				Lithuania	54
121	David Steene	1994	7		3	0.43	Switzerland (17)			1	Croatia	24
122	Warren Young	1994	9	7	35	3.89	Switzerland (17)				Monaco	33
123	Christophe Baumann	1994	8				Slovenia (19)				Tunisia	36
124	Jason Bloomfield	1994	3				Slovenia (19)				Bermuda	23
125	Greg Brittin	1994	23	2	10	0.44	Slovenia (19)				Lithuania	54
126	Mike Davies	1994	3				Slovenia (19)				Israel	25
127	Ken Dolan	1994	4				Slovenia (19)				Bermuda	23
128	Richard Hughes	1994	4	1	5	1.25	Slovenia (19)				Monaco	26
129	Murray Reiha	1994	2				Slovenia (19)				Croatia	20
130	Jason Brittin	1994	3				Croatia (20)				Bermuda	23
131	Mitch Growsky	1994	3				Croatia (20)				Bermuda	23
132	Harry Stroeher	1994	5				Croatia (20)				Monaco	33
133	Marco Bus	1995	14				Andorra (22)				Austria	44
134	Carlo Corollo	1995	4				Andorra (22)				Israel	25
135	John Vercoe	1995	8	1	5	0.63	Andorra (22)				Bulgaria	31
136	Fiorenzo Zampieri	1995	6				Bermuda (23)				Austria	44
137	Khurram Akram	1995	2				Croatia (24)				Israel	25
138	Reynaldo Figueredo	1995	7				Croatia (24)				Sweden	37
139	Matthew Jolly	1995	1				Croatia (24)				Croatia	24
140	Chris Moger	1995	3				Croatia (24)				Lithuania	27
141	Marco Peretti	1995	1				Croatia (24)				Croatia	24
142	David Bowen	1996	4				Israel (25)				Monaco	33
143	Aaron Burke	1996	3				Israel (25)				Hungary	28
144	Richard Dey	1996	1				Israel (25)				Israel	25
145	Enda Horan	1996	24				Israel (25)				Finland	66
146	Arnaud Tribellini	1996	35	2	10	0.29	Israel (25)				Bosnia and Herzegovina	63
147	Bruce Whiteman	1996	6				Israel (25)				Sweden	30
148	Clayton Adams	1996	2				Monaco (26)				Lithuania	27
149	Christophe Hoffmann	1996	32				Monaco (26)				Bosnia and Herzegovina	97
150	Marc Landgraf	1996	7				Monaco (26)				Monaco	33
151	James Bell	1996	3				Lithuania (27)				Sweden	30
152	Anthony Isturis	1996	17	5	25	1.47	Lithuania (27)				Lithuania	54
153	Steve Ridolfi	1996	9				Lithuania (27)				Bulgaria	78
154	James Boyd	1996	1				Hungary (28)				Hungary	28
155	Eric Lubert	1996	14	2	10	0.71	Hungary (28)				Austria	44
156	Peter Doyle	1997	4				Andorra (29)				Bosnia and Herzegovina	32
157	Ruadhri Guilfoyle	1997	31	4	38	1.23	Andorra (29)	3	4		Finland	73
158	Jerome Jansen	1997	3				Andorra (29)				Bulgaria	31
159	Richard Pickering	1997	2	1	16	8	Andorra (29)	1	3		Sweden	30
160	Derek Ramage	1997	7				Andorra (29)				Tunisia	36
161	Rolf Stub	1997	10				Andorra (29)				Austria	44
162	Simon Williams	1997	15	5	25	1.67	Andorra (29)				Israel	48
163	Youcef Bekhti	1997	1				Sweden (30)				Sweden	30
164	Francois Clement	1997	6				Bulgaria (31)				Tunisia	36
165	Mike Kimber	1997	1		2	2	Bulgaria (31)	1			Bulgaria	31
166	Jonathan Orr	1997	9	1	5	0.56	Bulgaria (31)				Israel	48
167	Nigel Sharplin	1997	51	4	20	0.39	Bulgaria (31)				Austria	101
168	Nigel Barnes	1998	2		10	5	Bosnia and Herzegovina (32)	2	2		Monaco	33
169	Guy Bishop	1998	1				Bosnia and Herzegovina (32)				Bosnia and Herzegovina	32
170	Stefan Focas	1998	22	3	18	0.82	Bosnia and Herzegovina (32)		1		Israel	62
171	Chis Muller	1998	2				Monaco (33)				Germany	34
172	Joe Lister	1998	27	2	10	0.37	Germany (34)				Israel	72
173	Andy Thompson	1998	27	1	5	0.19	Germany (34)				Bosnia and Herzegovina	70
174	Martin Thompson	1998	6	1	5	0.83	Germany (34)				Lithuania	39
175	Neil Wise	1998	20	2	10	0.5	Germany (34)				Norway	65
176	Diego Arras	1999	2				Belgium (35)				Tunisia	36
177	Stephane Badey	1999	1				Sweden (37)				Sweden	37
178	Patrick Boeglin	1999	14				Sweden (37)				Norway	65
179	Stephan Duvivier	1999	3				Sweden (37)				Latvia	41
180	Richard Gomm	1999	1				Sweden (37)				Sweden	37
181	Stuart Kelly	1999	33				Sweden (37)				Finland	90
182	Denis Laloy	1999	19	2	10	0.53	Sweden (37)				Finland	66
183	Gilles Severin	1999	1				Sweden (37)				Sweden	37
184	Dan Bunnag	2000	9	3	15	1.67	Norway (38)				Israel	72
185	Jonathan Harris	2000	24	7	65	2.71	Norway (38)	3	8		Greece	77
186	Steve Knowles	2000	21	11	63	3	Norway (38)	4			Israel	72
187	Jean-Francos Lens	2000	17	1	5	0.29	Norway (38)				Norway	65
188	Zelito Neves Dos Santos	2000	35				Norway (38)				Denmark	103
189	Alex Van Zeeland	2000	16	1	5	0.31	Norway (38)				Norway	65
190	Nick Barclay	2000	1				Norway (40)				Norway	40
191	Jean-Christophe Lepers	2000	4				Latvia (41)				Malta	50
192	Claude Da Col	2001	5				Israel (42)				Lithuania	52
193	Antoine Derr	2001	3				Israel (42)				Hungary	45
194	Eric Flammang	2001	7				Israel (42)				Israel	48
195	Jerome Maurice	2001	1				Israel (42)				Israel	42
196	Domenico Nardis	2001	2				Israel (42)				Sweden	43
197	Michael Parsons	2001	5				Israel (42)				Finland	93
198	Adis Sabotic	2001	9				Israel (42)				Lithuania	52
199	Patrick Simon	2001	7	1	5	0.71	Israel (42)				Austria	56
200	Vito Spinelli	2001	6				Israel (42)				Lithuania	52
201	Nicolas Villevieille	2001	3				Israel (42)				Austria	44
202	Jean-Jacques Oberst	2001	3				Sweden (43)				Malta	50
203	Christopher Savage	2001	2				Sweden (43)				Austria	44
204	Jeff Arendt	2001	1				Austria (44)				Austria	44
205	Claude Flener	2001	1				Austria (44)				Austria	44
206	Willy Lafaysse	2001	26	4	20	0.77	Austria (44)				Bulgaria	83
207	Loic Herve	2001	23	3	15	0.65	Hungary (45)				Israel	81
208	Enes Karisik	2001	5				Bosnia and Herzegovina (46)				Austria	51
209	Denis Melia	2001	1				Bosnia and Herzegovina (46)				Bosnia and Herzegovina	46
210	Cedric De Micheli	2002	13				Lithuania (47)				Finland	82
211	Guillaume Dubois	2002	7				Lithuania (47)				Austria	56
212	Jeremy Coote	2002	1				Bosnia and Herzegovina (49)				Bosnia and Herzegovina	49
213	Jannick D'Angelo	2002	10				Bosnia and Herzegovina (49)				Israel	62
214	Fred Herve	2003	4				Malta (50)				Israel	69
215	Luis Schroeder	2003	7				Malta (50)				Moldova	59
216	Christian Lowe	2003	16				Lithuania (52)				Sweden	109
217	Gavin Belton	2003	7	1	5	0.71	Bosnia and Herzegovina (53)				Austria	60
218	Raphael Gillet	2003	2				Bosnia and Herzegovina (53)				Finland	66
219	Laurent Najeros	2003	4				Bosnia and Herzegovina (53)				Austria	56
220	Jonathan Flynn	2003	23				Lithuania (54)				Bosnia and Herzegovina	92
221	Cedric Herve	2004	16	2	10	0.62	Denmark (57)				Israel	81
222	Pierre Husson	2004	4				Denmark (57)				Austria	60
223	John Paul Keane	2004	2				Denmark (57)				Germany	58
224	Hamish Irwin	2004	1				Germany (58)				Germany	58
225	Steve Speciale	2005	17				Moldova (59)				Bulgaria	75
226	Paul Sullivan	2005	15				Moldova (59)				Finland	73
227	Denis Harty	2005	4				Austria (60)				Norway	65
228	Patrick Wagner	2005	1				Austria (60)				Austria	60
229	Steve Clarke	2005	13	2	16	1.23	Armenia (61)		2		Greece	89
230	Ian Doherty	2005	13				Armenia (61)				Finland	73
231	Scott McKinlay	2005	25	2	10	0.4	Armenia (61)				Bosnia and Herzegovina	97
232	Donald Venkatapen	2005	4				Israel (62)				Finland	82
233	Olivier Cros	2005	4				Bosnia and Herzegovina (63)				Bosnia and Herzegovina	70
234	Alexandre Evard	2005	2				Bosnia and Herzegovina (63)				Finland	73
235	Julian Da Col	2006	36	3	15	0.42	Azerbaijan (64)				Denmark	103
236	Stephen Lowe	2006	6				Azerbaijan (64)				Slovenia	71
237	Emmanuel Arrou-Vignod	2006	4				Finland (66)				Israel	72
238	Guido Chimienti	2007	9				Bosnia and Herzegovina (67)				Greece	77
239	Phil Harvey	2007	3				Bosnia and Herzegovina (67)				Israel	69
240	Thibaud Sacaze	2007	10				Bosnia and Herzegovina (67)				Greece	89
241	Jean Benel	2007	2	1	5	2.5	Slovenia (68)				Israel	69
242	Nick Geoffreys	2007	12				Bosnia and Herzegovina (70)				Israel	81
243	Ronan Kuczaj	2007	3				Bosnia and Herzegovina (70)				Israel	76
244	Euan Roger	2007	9				Bosnia and Herzegovina (70)				Finland	79
245	Glenn Nordahl	2008	8				Slovenia (71)				Finland	79
246	Saman Rezapour	2008	44	5	25	0.57	Slovenia (71)				Hungary	119
247	Benoit Rousseau	2008	1				Slovenia (71)				Slovenia	71
248	Brice Fuhs	2008	1				Finland (73)				Finland	73
249	Adrien Timmermans	2008	34	11	59	1.74	Finland (73)	2			Hungary	119
250	Nick Abel	2008	7	1	5	0.71	Finland (74)				Greece	80
251	Will Bond	2008	4		6	1.5	Finland (74)		2		Finland	79
252	Stephane Decaris	2008	3				Finland (74)				Bulgaria	78
253	Paul Evans	2008	4	1	5	1.25	Finland (74)				Greece	77
254	Flavien Grimmer	2008	13				Finland (74)				Sweden	121
255	Hugo Lippert	2008	1				Finland (74)				Finland	74
256	Christophe Narcisse	2008	10				Finland (74)				Greece	93
257	Cedric Handtschoewercker	2008	6				Bulgaria (75)				Finland	90
258	Thomas Picherit	2008	2	1	8	4	Bulgaria (75)		1		Israel	76
259	Matthieu Poisson	2008	1				Bulgaria (75)				Bulgaria	75
260	Tim Seite	2008	20				Bulgaria (75)				Denmark	103
261	Michele Enlaro	2009	1				Israel (76)				Israel	76
262	Alex Goodhew	2009	8	1	25	3.13	Israel (76)	1	6		Bulgaria	87
263	Adam Marcus	2009	26				Israel (76)				Sweden	121
264	Max Dozin	2009	30	1	21	0.7	Greece (77)	2	3	1	Hungary	119
265	Nicolas Rivoallan	2009	11	1	5	0.45	Greece (77)				Finland	90
266	Alan Dunn	2009	8	1	18	2.25	Bulgaria (78)	2	3		Cyprus	85
267	Chris Ellis	2009	8				Bulgaria (78)				Bulgaria	87
268	Bryan Fage	2009	10				Bulgaria (78)				Finland	90
269	Michael Minehan	2009	7	1	7	1	Bulgaria (78)	1			Cyprus	85
270	Philippe Vimond	2009	24	6	30	1.25	Bulgaria (78)				Czech Republic	111
271	Christophe Balthazard	2010	9	2	10	1.11	Greece (80)				Greece	89
272	Aurelio Delvaux	2010	1				Israel (81)				Israel	81
273	Mathias Lentz	2010	3				Israel (81)				Bulgaria	83
274	Kim Zimmer	2010	16	1	5	0.31	Israel (81)				Sweden	109
275	Vincent Giffard	2010	26	1	5	0.19	Finland (82)				Hungary	119
276	Edward Medlyn	2010	3				Finland (82)				Cyprus	85
277	Erwan Rodier	2010	2				Finland (82)				Finland	88
278	David Wilson	2010	3				Bulgaria (83)				Cyprus	86
279	Damien Bessieres	2011	15				Greece (84)				Finland	99
280	Yared Ketema	2011	44	9	56	1.27	Greece (84)	1	3		Norway	136
281	Philippe Létalon	2011	3				Greece (84)				Bulgaria	87
282	Robin Dex	2011	13	2	10	0.77	Cyprus (85)				Finland	99
283	Matthieu Bracchetti	2011	1				Cyprus (86)				Cyprus	86
284	James Clarke	2011	8				Cyprus (86)				Denmark	106
285	Jan Louws	2011	9	2	10	1.11	Cyprus (86)				Greece	98
286	Ryan Shakespeare	2011	1				Cyprus (86)				Cyprus	86
287	Bertrand Cohen-Sabban	2012	5		36	7.2	Finland (88)	3	9		Greece	93
288	Philip Barnard	2012	14				Finland (90)				Slovenia	107
289	Tertius Barnard	2012	13				Finland (90)				Serbia	105
290	Samuel Deasy	2012	2				Finland (90)				Norway	91
291	Matias Garcia-Polak	2012	7				Finland (90)				Norway	96
292	James Harris	2012	7		6	0.86	Finland (90)		2		Finland	99
293	Jason Limpach	2012	9				Finland (90)				Finland	99
294	William Dennis	2012	18	2	10	0.56	Norway (91)				Estonia	113
295	Christopher Rossa	2012	16	6	30	1.88	Norway (91)				Latvia	108
296	Bob Wagner	2012	11				Norway (91)				Norway	115
297	Stuart Logier	2013	21	9	45	2.14	Bosnia and Herzegovina (92)				Finland	138
298	Matthew Hopwood	2013	2	1	5	2.5	Bosnia and Herzegovina (92)				Slovenia	94
299	Ciaran Keane	2013	16	1	47	2.94	Bosnia and Herzegovina (92)	6	9	1	Czech Republic	111
300	Yannick Boone	2013	11				Bosnia and Herzegovina (92)				Norway	115
301	John Fitzpatrick	2013	6	1	5	0.83	Israel (95)				Serbia	105
302	Ben Knight	2013	3				Israel (95)				Bosnia and Herzegovina	97
303	Sean Carroll	2013	16				Norway (96)				Moldova	130
304	Scott Browne	2014	27	4	245	9.07	Greece (98)	39	49		Austria	127
305	Jesper Christiansen	2014	1				Greece (98)				Greece	98
306	Thomas Kremer	2014	21	2	10	0.48	Greece (98)				Czechia	123
307	Christian Olsen	2014	21	4	20	0.95	Greece (98)				Norway	140
308	Francois Simon	2014	10	4	20	2	Greece (98)				Slovenia	107
309	Edoardo Angioni	2014	2				Serbia (100)				Austria	101
310	Benjamin Blanchet	2014	10				Serbia (100)				Czech Republic	111
311	Gareth Geoffreys	2014	17				Serbia (100)				Latvia	125
312	Jean-Baptiste Vert	2014	19	7	35	1.84	Serbia (100)				Hungary	119
313	Kevin Kombia	2015	8	1	5	0.63	Slovenia (102)				Hungary	119
314	Charel Poppalaars	2015	1				Slovenia (102)				Slovenia	102
315	Romain Kimmel	2015	16	1	5	0.31	Serbia (105)				Sweden	121
316	Quentin Dee	2016	22	1	5	0.23	Denmark (106)				Finland	138
317	Guillaume Kimmel	2016	21	4	20	0.95	Denmark (106)				Finland	138
318	Gautier Bares	2016	19	7	70	3.68	Slovenia (107)	10	5		Estonia	139
319	Ugo Nicoletta	2016	5				Latvia (108)				Moldova	118
320	Paul Remedi	2016	4				Latvia (108)				Czech Republic	111
321	Alex Romao	2016	6				Latvia (108)				Sweden	121
322	Pierre Toulet	2016	12	1	5	0.42	Latvia (108)				Latvia	125
323	Adrien Calmont	2017	7				Lithuania (110)				Czech Republic	120
324	Johan Lux	2017	1				Lithuania (110)				Lithuania	110
325	Thibault Lux	2017	2				Lithuania (110)				Czech Republic	111
326	Hugues Nzali	2017	14				Lithuania (110)				Latvia	125
327	Robin Plys	2017	2				Lithuania (110)				Estonia	113
328	Stefan Schaap	2017	12				Lithuania (110)				Slovenia	129
329	Charles Stone	2017	9	1	5	0.56	Lithuania (110)				Latvia	125
330	Victor Cendre	2017	13	2	10	0.77	Denmark (112)				Latvia	125
331	Matthew Dennis-Soto	2017	21	2	10	0.48	Denmark (112)				Norway	140
332	Maxim Kenens	2017	11	4	20	1.81	Denmark (112)				Norway	140
333	Jason Ribeiro	2017	2				Denmark (112)				Estonia	113
334	Malik Samba	2017	3				Denmark (112)				Norway	115
335	Rhys Williams	2017	9				Denmark (112)				Hungary	124
336	Tony Drennan	2018	16	5	25	1.56	Finland (114)				Norway	140
337	Olivier Lacroix	2018	4				Ukraine (116)				Sweden	121
338	Thomas Mahe	2018	4				Ukraine (116)				Czechia	123
339	Richard Marsden	2018	5				Ukraine (116)				Czech Republic	120
340	Josh Van Zeeland	2018	6				Ukraine (116)				Sweden	121
341	Josselin Gaspalou	2019	8	2	10	1.25	Moldova (118)				Moldova	130
342	Alexandre Brausch	2019	5	1	5	1	Hungary (119)				Latvia	125
343	Lars Hinz	2019	2				Hungary (119)				Czech Republic	120
344	Adrián Méndez Elola	2019	15	3	21	1.4	Hungary (119)	3			Norway	140
345	Hugo Bertani	2019	20	5	27	1.35	Czech Republic (120)	1			Estonia	139
346	Adrian Binder	2019	2				Czech Republic (120)				Sweden	121
347	Remy Geretti	2019	3				Czech Republic (120)				Latvia	125
348	Alexandre Piquet	2019	7	1	5	0.71	Czech Republic (120)				Finland	138
349	Eugene Gillespie	2019	1				Sweden (121)				Sweden	121
350	Ntsolo Setlaba	2019	1			Sweden (121)				Sweden	121	
351	Harry Vigor	2019	1				Sweden (121)				Sweden	121
352	Anton Agassi	2021	13	3	15	1.15	Sweden (122)				Norway	140
353	Thibault Tomasetto	2021	8				Sweden (122)				Czechia	133
354	Chobe Sweetnam	2021	6				Sweden (122)				Poland	135
355	Clement Blary	2021	4				Sweden (122)				Latvia	125
356	Liam Carroll	2021	10	3	15	1.5	Sweden (122)				Norway	136
357	Ralph Holter	2021	4				Sweden (122)				Latvia	125
358	Benjamin Silvestre	2021	3				Sweden (122)				Latvia	125
359	Oisin Kilgallen	2021	4				Sweden (122)				Latvia	125
360	Kai Sweetnam	2021	12	1	5	0.42	Czechia (123)				Norway	140
361	Arthur Binanzer	2021	1				Czechia (123)				Czechia	123
362	Gaël Pujadas	2022	6	2	10	1.67	Hungary (124)				Finland	138
363	Louis Moussel	2022	2				Hungary (124)				Latvia	125
364	Felipe Campos Madureira	2022	12				Hungary (124)				Estonia	137
365	Matteo Franzina	2022	11	8	44	4	Hungary (124)	2			Norway	140
366	Baptiste Lachaise	2022	1				Latvia (125)				Latvia	125
367	Anthony Rossi	2023	8				Bosnia and Herzegovina (126)				Finland	138
368	Ruben Albstmeijer	2023	7	1	5	0.71	Bosnia and Herzegovina (126)				Norway	140
369	Lucas Schmitt	2023	12	3	17	1.42	Bosnia and Herzegovina (126)	1			Finland	138
370	Domenico Orsino	2023	7	2	10	1.43	Bosnia and Herzegovina (126)				Finland	138
371	Thomas Deom	2023	5	2	10	2	Bosnia and Herzegovina (126)				Norway	140
372	John Fitzpatrick	2023	9	2	10	1.11	Bosnia and Herzegovina (126)				Norway	140
373	Luca Zanette-Mansel	2023	5	4	20	4	Bosnia and Herzegovina (126)				Lithuania	131
374	Fintan Lawlor	2023	14	11	164	11.71	Austria (127)	41	9		Norway	140
375	Noe Tropiano	2024	10	2	10	1	Hungary (128)				Estonia	137
376	Guillaume Thevenot	2024	7	1	5	0.71	Hungary (128)				Poland	135
377	Edward Graybrook	2024	13				Hungary (128)				Norway	140
378	Luke Ng Yan Kwong	2024	4	3	15	3.75	Hungary (128)				Norway	136
379	Dennis Logelin	2024	9				Slovenia (129)				Norway	140
380	Thomas Verlaque	2024	10	5	25	2.5	Lithuania (131)				Norway	140
381	Julian Clavien Timon	2024	5	1	5	1	Lithuania (131)				Estonia	137
382	Finley Dew	2024	1				Lithuania (131)				Lithuania	131
383	James Wheeler	2024	8	1	5	0.63	Lithuania (131)				Norway	140
384	Peter Barton	2025	4				Czechia (133)				Estonia	139
385	Oscar Whiteman	2025	4	1	5	1.25	Czechia (133)				Estonia	137
386	William Verrinder	2025	5	2	10	2	Czechia (133)				Norway	140
387	Callum Trees	2025	4	1	5	0.8	Sweden (134)				Norway	140
388	Stefano Musolino	2025	2				Sweden (134)				Poland	135
389	Louis Darras	2025	4	1	5	1.25	Estonia (137)				Norway	140
390	Melvil Ruppert	2025	1				Estonia (137)				Estonia	137
391	Casmier Yandall	2025	1				Estonia (137)				Estonia	137
392	Bryan Haeck	2025	1				Estonia (137)				Estonia	137
393	Gauthier Fontanive	2026	1				Finland (138)				Finland	138
394	Tristan Touzellier	2026	2				Estonia (139)				Norway	140
395	James O'Donoghue	2026	1				Estonia (139)				Estonia	139
396	Federico Inciarte	2026	2				Estonia (139)				Norway	140
397	Mattia Reuter	2026	1	1	5	5	Norway (140)				Norway	140

== See also ==
- Luxembourg national rugby union team
- Luxembourg Rugby Federation
- Rugby union in Luxembourg
- Luxembourg women's national rugby union team
- Luxembourg national rugby sevens team
- List of international rugby union families

=== Clubs ===
- Rugby Club Luxembourg
- Rugby Club Walferdange
