= 2004–2006 European Nations Cup Third Division =

The 2004–2006 European Nations Cup was the fifth edition of the newly reformed European Championship for tier 2 & 3 Rugby Union Nations.

First division was played with a regular tournament.

In 2004–05 Season, the team of second and third division play the first two round of European qualification for RWC 2007

The team defeated in the first round and two new teams (Azerbaijan) and Armenia) played a "challenge", that wasn't completed.

In 2005–06 a tournament was regularly played by the team excluded from third round of European qualification for RWC 2007

== Pool A ==
The highest level was the Pool "A", with five teams, the best runner-up of RWC qualification

- Austria
- Denmark
- Latvia
- Sweden
- Switzerland

=== Table ===
Place	Nation	Games				Points			Table points
Place	Nation	played	won	drawn	lost	for	against	difference	Table points
1	Latvia	4	4	0	0	86	18	+68	12
2	Sweden	4	3	0	1	67	28	+39	10
3	Switzerland	4	1	0	3	34	87	−53	8
4	Denmark	4	1	0	3	24	37	−13	6
5	Austria	4	1	0	3	18	59	−41	4

- Latvia promoted to division 2
- Austria relegated to group B

=== Results ===
5 November 2005

Sweden	16–4	Denmark

Helsingborg

22 October 2005

Latvia	18–5	Sweden

Riga

26 November 2005

Latvia	42–6	Switzerland

Riga

3 December 2005

Switzerland	8–7	Denmark

Avusy

1 April 2006

Denmark	0–8	Latvia

Odense

8 April 2006

Denmark	13–5	Austria

Fredericia

22 April 2006

Sweden	35–3	Switzerland

Gothenburg

29 April 2006

Austria	3–11	Sweden

Wien

6 May 2006

Austria	3–17	Switzerland

Wien

20 May 2006

Latvia	18–7	Austria

Riga

== Pool B-C playoff ==
Preliminary play off was played between 6 team in two round, with two worst team of RWC 2007 qualification admitted to second round

=== First round ===
16 April 2005

Bosnia and Herzegovina	36–17	Azerbaijan

Zenica

30 April 2005

Azerbaijan	11–8	Bosnia and Herzegovina

Baku

7 May 2005

Israel	15–47	Armenia

Yerevan

11 June 2005

Armenia	31–12	Israel

Yerevan

=== Second round ===
24 September 2005

Hungary	24–9	Bosnia and Herzegovina

Esztergom

1 October 2005

Luxembourg	12–39	Armenia

Cessange

== Pool B ==
The middle level was the Pool "B", with five teams:

- Armenia
- Bulgaria
- Lithuania
- Slovenia
- Hungary

=== Table ===
Place	Nation	Games				Points			Table points
Place	Nation	played	won	drawn	lost	for	against	difference	Table points
1	Armenia	4	4	0	0	141	42	+99	12
2	Hungary	4	2	0	2	67	64	+3	8
3	Lithuania	4	2	0	2	94	69	+25	8
4	Bulgaria	4	1	0	3	61	158	−97	6
5	Slovenia	4	1	0	3	54	84	−30	6

- Armenia promoted to group A
- Slovenia relegated to group C

=== Results ===
8 October 2005

Slovenia	12–15	Hungary

Ljubliana

29 October 2005

Lithuania	65–12	Bulgaria

Vilnius

11 November 2005

Armenia	57–17	Bulgaria

Romans

26 November 2005

Bulgaria	27–14	Slovenia

Sofia

22 April 2006

Bulgaria	5–22	Hungary

Sofia

29 April 2006

Hungary	13–24	Armenia

Esztergom

6 May 2006

Slovenia	22–0	Lithuania

Ljubliana

13 May 2006

Armenia	42–6	Slovenia

Budapest

27 May 2006

Hungary	17–23	Lithuania

Budapest

4 June 2006

Lithuania	6–18	Armenia

Šiauliai

== Pool C ==
Participating:

- Azerbaijan
- Bosnia and Herzegovina
- Israel
- Luxembourg
- Norway

=== Table ===
Place	Nation	Games				Points			Table points
Place	Nation	played	won	drawn	lost	for	against	difference	Table points
1	Norway	4	4	0	0	120	49	+71	12
2	Luxembourg	4	3	0	1	78	38	+40	10
3	Israel	4	2	0	2	97	52	+45	8
4	Bosnia and Herzegovina	4	1	0	3	67	104	−37	6
5	Azerbaijan	4	0	0	4	20	139	−119	4

- Norway promoted to group B
- Azerbaijan relegated to group D

=== Results ===
29 October 2005

Luxembourg	19-3	Israel

Luxembourg City

29 October 2005

Norway	43-3	Azerbaijan

Oslo

12 November 2005

Azerbaijan	7-37	Israel

Baku

12 November 2005

Bosnia and Herzegovina	7-20	Luxembourg

Sarajevo

26 November 2005

Israel	15-17	Norway

Tel Aviv

29 April 2006

Azerbaijan	3-31	Luxembourg

Baku

6 May 2006

Israel	42-0	Bosnia and Herzegovina

Netanya

6 May 2006

Luxembourg	8-25	Norway

Luxembourg City

13 May 2006

Bosnia and Herzegovina	28-7	Azerbaijan

Zenica

3 June 2006

Norway	35-25	Bosnia and Herzegovina

Stavanger

== Group D ==
14 May 2006

Greece	12–17	Finland

Athens

28 May 2006

Finland	27–0	Greece

Helsinki

- Finland Promoted to pool C

== See also ==
- 2004–2006 European Nations Cup First Division
- 2007 Rugby World Cup – Europe qualification

== Sources ==
- www.irb.com
