= Luxembourg national rugby sevens team =

Luxembourg Rugby Federation
- Union: Fédération Luxembourgeoise de rugby
Team kit	Change kit

Official website
- www.rugby.lu

The Luxembourg national rugby sevens team made up primarily from the XV Team competes annually in European competitions. Entered first tournament in 1996.

== Tournament History ==
=== 1996 Portugal ===
I (Portugal) Lisbon (1-2 June) 1997 Rugby World Cup 7s Qualifier 1

#	Opponent	Phase	FLR	Opp	W/L/D	T	C	Scorers
1	Latvia	R1	12	41	L	2	1	PW2; c BW
2	Portugal	R1	12	47	L	2	1	AB PW; c BW
3	New Zealand	R2	10	66	L	2	-	BW PW
4	Hungary	R2	26	0	W	4	3	CB2 GC PW; c GC3
5	Poland	Q/F Plate	10	33	L	2	-	BW PW

Luxembourg Squad

K Akram C Baumann G Brittin A Burke G Cope R Dey M Landgraf B Whiteman P Whitten W Young

=== 2000 Germany ===
II (Germany) Heidelberg (10-11 June) 2001 Rugby World Cup 7s Europe Qualifier 1

#	Opponent	Phase	FLR	Opp	W/L/D	T	C	Scorers
6	Belgium	R1 Group B	35	5	W	5	5	GB SF3 JO; c JH5
7	Denmark	R1 Group B	14	19	L	2	2	JH AVZ, c JH2
8	Romania	R1 Group B	0	40	L	-	-	
9	Wales	R2 Group B	0	47	L	-	-	
10	Austria	R2 Group B	35	5	W	5	5	GB SF RG JH2; c JH5
11	Czech Republic	R2 Group B	21	12	W	3	3	GB2 AI; c JH3

Luxembourg Squad

G Brittin D Bunnag S Focas R Guilfoyle J Harris A Isturis J Orr M Thompson A Van Zeeland S Williams

=== 2002 France Spain Germany ===
III (France) Lunel (17-18 May) Euro Sevens I Qualifier 1

#	Opponent	Phase	FLR	Opp	W/L/D	T	C	Scorers
12	Georgia	Group A	0	43	L	-	-	
13	Portugal	Group A	0	49	L	-	-	
14	Switzerland	Group A	5	19	L	1	-	
15	Bulgaria	S/F Plate	7	17	L	1	1	
16	Belgium	Final 7th	33	12	W	5	4	

Luxembourg Squad

P Boeglin G Caviglia E Flammang S Focas J Harris E Karisik JF Lens D Melia A Thompson A Tribellini

IV (Spain) Madrid (15-16 June) Euro Sevens I Qualifier 4

#	Opponent	Phase	FLR	Opp	W/L/D	T	C	Scorers
17	Spain	Q/F Cup	0	36	L	-	-	
18	Malta	S/F Plate	12	17	L	2	1	
19	Monaco	Final 7th	40	5	W	6	5	

Luxembourg Squad

G Brittin D Bunnag G Caviglia S Focas J Harris L Herve S Knowles JF Lens J Lister A Thompson

V (Germany) Heidelberg (17-18 August) Euro Sevens Championship

#	Opponent	Phase	FLR	Opp	W/L/D	T	C	Scorers
20	France	Group A	0	35	L	-	-	
21	Poland	Group A	0	42	L	0	0	
22	Germany	Group A	0	45	L	-	-	
23	Lithuania	Group A	14	45	L	2	2	
24	Denmark	Group A	0	38	L	-	-	
25	Netherlands	S/F Bowl	7	28	L	1	1	
26	Czech Republic	Final 11th	12	26	L	2	1	

Luxembourg Squad

E Flammang S Focas J Harris S Kelly JC Lepers J Lister N Sharplin A Thompson A Van Zeeland N Wise

=== 2003 Netherlands Portugal ===
VI (Netherlands) Amsterdam (17-18 May) Euro Sevens II Qualifier 1

#	Opponent	Phase	FLR	Opp	W/L/D	T	C	Scorers
27	France	Group A	0	14	L	-	-	
28	Lithuania	Group A	0	46	L	-	-	
29	Netherlands	Group A	0	61	L	-	-	
30	Norway	S/F Plate	5	38	L	1	-	
31	Belgium	Final 7th	0	45	L	-	-	

Luxembourg Squad

J D'Angelo T Edmonston-Low S Focas J Harris H Irwin E Karisik D Laloy JF Lens J Lister B Smith

VII Portugal, Lisbon (21-22 June) Euro Sevens II Qualifier 7

#	Opponent	Phase	FLR	Opp	W/L/D	T	C	Scorers
32	Portugal	Group A	12	35	L	2	1	
33	Spain	Group A	12	47	L	2	1	
34	Croatia	Group A	0	38	L	-	-	
35	Malta	S/F Plate	7	19	L	1	1	
36	Israel	Final 7th	14	26	L	2	2	

Luxembourg Squad

P Boeglin G Brittin G Caviglia S Focas J Harris A Isturis W Lafaysse D Laloy J Lister A Van Zeeland

=== 2004 Russia Ukraine ===
VIII (Russia) Moscow (19-20 June) Euro Sevens III Qualifier 5

#	Opponent	Phase	FLR	Opp	W/L/D	T	C	Scorers
37	Scotland	Group A	0	48	L	-	-	
38	Germany	Group A	7	21	L	1	1	
39	Netherlands	Group A	0	59	L	-	-	
40	Israel	Group A	31	10	W	5	3	
41	Latvia	S/F Plate	14	31	L	2	2	
42	Sweden	Final 7th	0	38	L	-	-	

Luxembourg Squad

J D'Angelo S Focas R Guilfoyle L Herve S Knowles W Lafaysse JF Lens J Lister L Najeros A Van Zeeland

IX (Ukraine) Kyiv (26-27 June) Euro Sevens III Qualifier 6

#	Opponent	Phase	FLR	Opp	W/L/D	T	C	Scorers
43	Georgia	Group A	0	59	L	-	-	
44	Netherlands	Group A	5	26	L	1	-	
45	Ukraine	Group A	0	38	L	-	-	
46	Austria	S/F Plate	22	7	W	4	1	
47	Moldova	Final 7th	0	55	L	-	-	
48	Netherlands	Final 7th	14	33	L	2	2	

Luxembourg Squad

J D'Angelo S Focas R Guilfoyle L Herve S Knowles W Lafaysse JF Lens J Lister L Najeros A Van Zeeland

=== 2005 Croatia France ===
X (Croatia) Split (17-18 June) Euro Sevens IV Qualifier 2

#	Opponent	Phase	FLR	Opp	W/L/D	T	C	Scorers
49	Lithuania	Group B	0	24	L	-	-	
50	Bosnia and Herzegovina	Group B	14	38	L	2	2	
51	Monaco	Group B	19	19	D	3	2	
52	Italy	Group B	0	33	L	-	-	
53	Czech Republic	S/F1 Plate	7	19	L	1	1	
54	Bosnia and Herzegovina	S/F2 Plate	12	28	L	2	1	
55	Switzerland	Final 7th	28	12	W	4	4	

Luxembourg Squad

G Caviglia J D'Angelo R Guilfoyle J Harris L Herve W Lafaysse D Laloy JF Lens J Lister N Sharplin

XI (France) Lunel (25-26 June) Euro Sevens IV Qualifier 3

#	Opponent	Phase	FLR	Opp	W/L/D	T	C	Scorers
56	Italy	Group A	0	63	L	-	-	
57	Netherlands	Group A	0	45	L	-	-	
58	Romania	Group A	0	33	L	-	-	
59	Armenia	Group A	14	26	L	2	2	
60	Monaco	Final Bowl	0	20	L	-	-	

Luxembourg Squad

G Caviglia S Clarke R Guilfoyle L Herve D Laloy JF Lens J Lister A Van Zeeland T Whiteman

=== 2006 Croatia France ===
XII (Croatia) Split (27-28 May) Euro Sevens V Qualifier 2

#	Opponent	Phase	FLR	Opp	W/L/D	T	C	Scorers
61	Portugal	Group A	0	43	L	-	-	
62	Netherlands	Group A	7	28	L	1	1	
63	Andorra	Group A	0	40	L	-	-	
64	Israel	Group A	17	10	W	3	1	
65	Bosnia and Herzegovina	S/F Plate	12	32	L	2	1	
66	Serbia	Final 7th	19	12	W	3	2	

Luxembourg Squad

M Arrou-Vigoud O Cros G Caviglia J Da Col J D'Angelo F Herve L Herve J Lister M Lowe S Lowe

XIII (France) Lunel (3-4 June) Euro Sevens V Qualifier 3

#	Opponent	Phase	FLR	Opp	W/L/D	T	C	Scorers
67	France	Group A	0	33	L	-	-	
68	Georgia	Group A	0	28	L	-	-	
69	Netherlands	Group A	7	31	L	1	1	
70	Monaco	Group A	5	21	L	1	-	
71	Malta	Final Bowl	26	39	L	4	3	

Luxembourg Squad

M Arrou-Vigoud O Cros G Caviglia J Da Col A Evrard R Gillet S Knowles D Laloy S Lowe N Sharplin

=== 2007 France ===
XIV (France) Lunel (2-3 June) Euro Sevens VI Qualifier 4

#	Opponent	Phase	FLR	Opp	W/L/D	T	C	Scorers
72	France	Group A	0	42	L	-	-	
73	Netherlands	Group A	5	38	L	1	-	
74	Lithuania	Group A	0	24	L	-	-	
75	Norway	Group A	12	21	L	2	1	
76	Czech Republic	Final Bowl	5	26	L	1	-	

Luxembourg Squad

G Caviglia J Da Col L Davies P Halter F El Jabrouni C Herve F Herve H Nzali N Rivoallan S Speciale

=== 2008 Denmark Greece ===
XV (Denmark) Odense (10-11 May) Euro Sevens Qualifier 1

#	Opponent	Phase	FLR	Opp	W/L/D	T	C	Scorers
77	Romania	Group A	0	28	L	-	-	
78	Sweden	Group A	0	40	L	-	-	
79	Belgium	Group A	7	41	L	1	1	
80	Monaco	Group A	7	36	L	1	1	
81	Austria	Final Bowl	33	7	W	5	4	

Luxembourg Squad

M Arrou-Vigoud G Chimienti A Cochet J Da Col A Evrard N Geoffreys J Harris W Lafaysse S Rezapour A Timmermans

XVI (Greece) Corfu (21-22 June) Euro Sevens Qualifier 6

#	Opponent	Phase	FLR	Opp	W/L/D	T	C	Scorers
82	Russia	Group A	0	38	L	-	-	
83	Greece Corfu	Group A	22	0	W	4	1	
84	Andorra	Group A	0	47	L	-	-	
85	Bosnia and Herzegovina	Group A	7	45	L	1	1	
86	Greece	S/F Plate	0	33	L	-	-	
87	Cyprus	Final 7th	0	29	L	-	-	

Luxembourg Squad

S Clarke A Cochet J Da Col M Dozin N Geoffreys C Herve T Picherit S Rezapour E Rogers A Timmermans

=== 2009 Poland Greece ===
XVII (Poland) Sopot (16-17 May) Euro Sevens Qualifier 1

#	Opponent	Phase	FLR	Opp	W/L/D	T	C	Scorers
88	Portugal	Group A	0	56	L	-	-	
89	Latvia	Group A	12	27	L	2	1	
90	Sweden	Group A	5	31	L	1	-	
91	Hungary	Group A	17	5	W	3	1	
92	Denmark	S/F Plate	7	33	L	1	1	
93	Latvia	Final 7th	14	29	L	2	2	

Luxembourg Squad

N Abel J Da Col N Geoffreys J Harris C Lowe A Marcus N Nordahl E Rogers A Timmermans *

XVIII (Greece) Athens (23-24 May) Euro Sevens Qualifier 2

#	Opponent	Phase	FLR	Opp	W/L/D	T	C	Scorers
94	Portugal	Group A	0	49	L	-	-	
95	Latvia	Group A	7	36	L	1	1	
96	Sweden	Group A	14	38	L	2	2	
97	Hungary	Group A	0	50	L	-	-	
98	Denmark	Final Bowl	0	27	L	-	-	

Luxembourg Squad

N Abel J Da Col M Dozin N Geoffreys L Herve C Lowe A Marcus S McKinlay E Rogers A Timmermans

=== 2010 Denmark Croatia ===
XIX (Denmark) Odense (22-23 May) Euro Sevens Qualifier 2

#	Opponent	Phase	FLR	Opp	W/L/D	T	C	Scorers
99	Spain	Group B	0	45	L	-	-	
100	Switzerland	Group B	21	33	L	3	3	
101	Czech Republic	Group B	5	40	L	1	-	
102	Andorra	Group B	5	19	L	1	-	
103	Norway	Final Bowl	12	24	L	2	1	

Luxembourg Squad
T Barnard M Dozin A Dunn N Geoffreys C Lowe M Minehan G Nordahl S Rezapour A Timmermans P Vimond

XX (Croatia) Split (5-6 June) Euro Sevens Qualifier 5

#	Opponent	Phase	FLR	Opp	W/L/D	T	C	Scorers
104	Italy	Group A	0	45	L	-	-	
105	Netherlands	Group A	0	61	L	-	-	
106	Croatia	Group A	7	21	L	1	1	
107	Serbia	Group A	19	33	L	3	2	
108	Bosnia and Herzegovina	Final Bowl	40	7	W	6	5	

Luxembourg Squad
N Abel J Da Col S Decaris M Dozin A Dunn W Lafaysse M Minehan S Rezapour A Timmermans P Vimond

=== 2011 Latvia ===
XXI (Latvia) Riga (9-10 July) Euro Sevens Series Division B

#	Opponent	Phase	FLR	Opp	W/L/D	T	C	Scorers
109	Slovakia	Group B	45	5	W	7	5	
110	Monaco	Group B	19	5	W	3	2	
111	Greece	Group B	15	17	L	3	-	
112	Serbia	Group B	7	24	L	1	1	
113	Bosnia and Herzegovina	Group B	7	14	L	1	1	
114	Bulgaria	S/F Plate	0	19	L	-	-	
115	Monaco	Final 7th	19	24	L	3	2	

Luxembourg Squad
C Balthazard J Da Col R Dex M Dozin A Dunn B Fage A Goodhew Y Ketema S Rezapour P Vimond

=== 2012 Switzerland ===
XXII (Switzerland) Winterthur (2-3 June) Euro Sevens Series Division B

#	Opponent	Phase	FLR	Opp	W/L/D	T	C	Scorers
116	Croatia	Group A	5	47	L	1	-	
117	Greece	Group A	12	17	L	2	1	
118	Slovakia	Group A	12	24	L	2	1	
119	Monaco	Group A	14	19	L	2	2	
120	Hungary	Group A	7	24	L	1	1	
121	Switzerland	S/F Bowl	7	22	L	1	1	
122	Malta	Final 11th	47	7	W	7	6	

Luxembourg Squad
T Barnard J Da Col W Dennis B Fage C Handtschoewercker M Hopwood G Nordahl S Rezapour E Rodier A Timmermans

=== 2013 Latvia ===
XXIII (Latvia) Riga (1-2 June) Euro Sevens Series Division B

#	Opponent	Phase	FLR	Opp	W/L/D	T	C	Scorers
123	Azerbaijan	Group A	38	12	W	6	4	
124	Iceland	Group A	26	0	W	4	3	
125	Latvia	Group A	7	28	L	1	1	
126	Norway	S/F Cup	14	19	L	2	2	
127	Slovakia	Final 3rd	34	7	W	6	2	

Luxembourg Squad
E Angioni T Barnard W Dennis R Dex J Fitzpatrick James Harris C Keane Y Ketema C Olsen S Rezapour A Timmermans P Vimond

=== 2014 Czech Republic ===
XXIV (Czech Republic) Prague (28-29 June) Euro Sevens Division B North Zone

#	Opponent	Phase	FLR	Opp	W/L/D	T	C	Scorers
128	Bosnia and Herzegovina	Group B	24	7	W	4	2	
129	Iceland	Group B	56	0	W	8	8	
130	Norway	Group B	12	28	L	2	1	
131	Czech Republic	S/F Cup	5	24	L	1	-	
132	Slovakia	Final 3rd	26	7	W	4	3	

Luxembourg Squad
E Agioni T Barnard S Browne M Dozin J Fitzpatrick C Keane Y Ketema S Logier P Reiter S Rezapour F Simon P Vimond

=== 2015 Croatia ===
(Croatia) Zagreb (20-21 June) Euro Sevens Series Division B

This tournament was valid as European Qualifier for the 2016 Olympic Games. Luxembourg withdrew prior to tournament.

=== 2016 Bulgaria ===
XXV (Bulgaria) Bourgas (2-3 July) Euro 7s Conference 1

#	Opponent	Phase	FLR	Opp	W/L/D	T	C	Scorers
133	Norway	Group B	28	7	W	4	4	
134	Bulgaria	Group B	38	10	W	6	4	
135	Croatia	Group B	15	7	W	3	-	
136	Turkey	Group B	26	17	W	4	3	
137	Serbia	S/F Cup	36	7	W	6	3	
138	Croatia	Final Cup	14	45	L	2	2	

Luxembourg Squad

G Bares S Browne M Dozin Y Ketema R Kimmel S Logier C Olsen P Remedi C Rossa A Timmermans P Vimond JB Vert

=== 2017 Czech Republic Romania ===
XXVI (Czech Republic) Ostavia (3-4 June) Trophy Leg 1

#	Opponent	Phase	FLR	Opp	W/L/D	T	C	Scorers
139	Cyprus	Group A	21	21	D	3	3	
140	Moldova	Group A	35	0	W	5	5	
141	Lithuania	Group A	21	5	W	3	3	
142	Latvia	Q/F Cup	26	12	W	4	3	
143	Romania	S/F Cup	5	31	L	1		
144	Ukraine	Final 3rd	14	10	W	2	2	

Luxembourg Squad

G Bares S Browne M Dozin Y Ketema R Kimmel S Logier C Olsen C Stone JB Vert P Vimond

XXVII (Romania) Bucharest (17-18 June) Trophy Leg 2

#	Opponent	Phase	FLR	Opp	W/L/D	T	C	Scorers
145	Lithuania	Group C	21	28	L	3	3	
146	Moldova	Group C	26	0	W	4	3	
147	Ukraine	Group C	14	21	L	2	2	
148	Israel	Q/F Cup	15	10	W	3	-	
149	Sweden	S/F Cup	7	26	L	1	1	
150	Romania	Final 3rd	0	29	L	-	-	

Luxembourg Squad

E Agioni G Bares M Dozin G Geoffreys S Logier H Nzali Y Ketema C Olsen C Stone JB Vert P Vimond

=== 2018 Croatia Lithuania ===
XXVIII (Croatia) Zagreb (8-9 June) Trophy Leg 1

#	Opponent	Phase	FLR	Opp	W/L/D	T	C	Scorers
151	Latvia	Group C	19	5	W	3	1	
152	Denmark	Group C	7	24	L	1	1	
153	Ukraine	Group C	12	20	L	2	1	
154	Romania	Q/F Cup	14	27	L	2	2	
155	Denmark	S/F Plate	7	17	L	1	1	
156	Croatia	7th Place	14	7	W	2	2	

Luxembourg Squad

E Angioni D Ascoli M Dozin G Geoffreys Y Ketema G Kimmel R Kimmel C Olsen C Stone A Timmermans J Van Zeeland JB Vert

XXIX (Lithuania) Siaulai (31 June-1 July) Trophy Leg 2

#	Opponent	Phase	FLR	Opp	W/L/D	T	C	Scorers
157	Ukraine	Group A	5	5	D	1	-	
158	Romania	Group A	24	22	W	4	2	
159	Latvia	Group A	17	17	D	3	1	
160	Denmark	Q/F Cup	0	24	L	-	-	
161	Croatia	S/F Plate	24	21	W	4	2	
162	Lithuania	5th Place	5	22	L	1	-	

Luxembourg Squad

E Angioni D Ascoli G Bares M Dozin G Geoffreys Y Ketema G Kimmel R Kimmel C Olsen C Stone JB Vert R Williams

=== 2019 Croatia (Bosnia and Herzegovina) Bosnia ===
XXX (Croatia) Zagreb (15-16 June) Trophy Leg 1

#	Opponent	Phase	FLR	Opp	W/L/D	T	C	Scorers
163	Latvia	Group A	28	0	W	4	4	
164	Bosnia and Herzegovina	Group A	19	14	W	3	2	
165	Sweden	Group A	0	29	L	0	0	
166	Lithuania	Q/F Cup	12	33	L	2	1	
167	Denmark	S/F Plate	5	7	L	1	0	
168	Sweden	7th Place	7	22	L	1	1	

Luxembourg Squad

G Bares H Bertani A Binder A Brausch S Browne M Dozin G Geoffreys R Kimmel K Kombia C Olsen C Stone T Verlaque

XXXI (Bosnia and Herzegovina) Zenica (22-23 June) Trophy Leg 2

#	Opponent	Phase	FLR	Opp	W/L/D	T	C	Scorers
169	Israel	Group B	15	12	W	3	0	
170	Ukraine	Group B	0	41	L	0	0	
171	Latvia	Group B	17	17	D	3	1	
172	Lithuania	Q/F Cup	7	38	L	1	1	
173	Denmark	S/F Plate	21	10	W	3	3	
174	Croatia	5th Place	0	31	L	0	0	

Luxembourg Squad

H Bertani A Binder S Browne M Dozin G Geoffreys Y Ketema R Kimmel K Kombia C Olsen A Timmermans J Van Zeeland T Verlaque

== Record ==
#	Opponent	Phase	FLR	Opp	W/L/D	T	C	Year / Comments
1	Latvia	R1	12	41	L	2	1	1996
2	Portugal	R1	12	47	L	2	1	1996
3	New Zealand	R2	10	66	L	2	-	1996
4	Hungary	R2	26	0	W	4	3	1996
5	Poland	Q/F Plate	10	33	L	2	-	1996
6	Belgium	R1 Group B	35	5	W	5	5	2000
7	Denmark	R1 Group B	14	19	L	2	2	2000
8	Romania	R1 Group B	0	40	L	-	-	2000
9	Wales	R2 Group B	0	47	L	-	-	2000
10	Austria	R2 Group B	35	5	W	5	5	2000
11	Czech Republic	R2 Group B	21	12	W	3	3	2000
12	Georgia	Group A	0	43	L	-	-	2002
13	Portugal	Group A	0	49	L	-	-	2002
14	Switzerland	Group A	5	19	L	1	-	2002
15	Bulgaria	S/F Plate	7	17	L	1	1	2002
16	Belgium	Final 7th	33	12	W	5	4	2002
17	Spain	Q/F Cup	0	36	L	-	-	2002
18	Malta	S/F Plate	12	17	L	2	1	2002
19	Monaco	Final 7th	40	5	W	6	5	2002
20	France	Group A	0	35	L	-	-	2002
21	Poland	Group A	0	42	L	0	0	2002
22	Germany	Group A	0	45	L	-	-	2002
23	Lithuania	Group A	14	45	L	2	2	2002
24	Denmark	Group A	0	38	L	-	-	2002
25	Netherlands	S/F Bowl	7	28	L	1	1	2002
26	Czech Republic	Final 11th	12	26	L	2	1	2002
27	France	Group A	0	14	L	-	-	2003
28	Lithuania	Group A	0	46	L	-	-	2003
29	Netherlands	Group A	0	61	L	-	-	2003
30	Norway	S/F Plate	5	38	L	1	-	2003
31	Belgium	Final 7th	0	45	L	-	-	2003
32	Portugal	Group A	12	35	L	2	1	2003
33	Spain	Group A	12	47	L	2	1	2003
34	Croatia	Group A	0	38	L	-	-	2003
35	Malta	S/F Plate	7	19	L	1	1	2003
36	Israel	Final 7th	14	26	L	2	2	2003
37	Scotland	Group A	0	48	L	-	-	2004
38	Germany	Group A	7	21	L	1	1	2004
39	Netherlands	Group A	0	59	L	-	-	2004
40	Israel	Group A	31	10	W	5	3	2004
41	Latvia	S/F Plate	14	31	L	2	2	2004
42	Sweden	Final 7th	0	38	L	-	-	2004
43	Georgia	Group A	0	59	L	-	-	2004
44	Netherlands	Group A	5	26	L	1	-	2004
45	Ukraine	Group A	0	38	L	-	-	2004
46	Austria	S/F Plate	22	7	W	4	1	2004
47	Moldova	Final 7th	0	55	L	-	-	2004
48	Netherlands	Final 7th	14	33	L	2	2	2004
49	Lithuania	Group B	0	24	L	-	-	2005
50	Bosnia and Herzegovina	Group B	14	38	L	2	2	2005
51	Monaco	Group B	19	19	D	3	2	2005
52	Italy	Group B	0	33	L	-	-	2005
53	Czech Republic	S/F1 Plate	7	19	L	1	1	2005
54	Bosnia and Herzegovina	S/F2 Plate	12	28	L	2	1	2005
55	Switzerland	Final 7th	28	12	W	4	4	2005
56	Italy	Group A	0	63	L	-	-	2005
57	Netherlands	Group A	0	45	L	-	-	2005
58	Romania	Group A	0	33	L	-	-	2005
59	Armenia	Group A	14	26	L	2	2	2005
60	Monaco	Final Bowl	0	20	L	-	-	2005
61	Portugal	Group A	0	43	L	-	-	2006
62	Netherlands	Group A	7	28	L	1	1	2006
63	Andorra	Group A	0	40	L	-	-	2006
64	Israel	Group A	17	10	W	3	1	2006
65	Bosnia and Herzegovina	S/F Plate	12	32	L	2	1	2006
66	Serbia	Final 7th	19	12	W	3	2	2006
67	France	Group A	0	33	L	-	-	2006
68	Georgia	Group A	0	28	L	-	-	2006
69	Netherlands	Group A	7	31	L	1	1	2006
70	Monaco	Group A	5	21	L	1	-	2006
71	Malta	Final Bowl	26	39	L	4	3	2006
72	France	Group A	0	42	L	-	-	2007
73	Netherlands	Group A	5	38	L	1	-	2007
74	Lithuania	Group A	0	24	L	-	-	2007
75	Norway	Group A	12	21	L	2	1	2007
76	Czech Republic	Final Bowl	5	26	L	1	-	2007
77	Romania	Group A	0	28	L	-	-	2008
78	Sweden	Group A	0	40	L	-	-	2008
79	Belgium	Group A	7	41	L	1	1	2008
80	Monaco	Group A	7	36	L	1	1	2008
81	Austria	Final Bowl	33	7	W	5	4	2008
82	Russia	Group A	0	38	L	-	-	2008
83	Greece Corfu	Group A	22	0	W	4	1	2008
84	Andorra	Group A	0	47	L	-	-	2008
85	Bosnia and Herzegovina	Group A	7	45	L	1	1	2008
86	Greece	S/F Plate	0	33	L	-	-	2008
87	Cyprus	Final 7th	0	29	L	-	-	2008
88	Portugal	Group A	0	56	L	-	-	2009
89	Latvia	Group A	12	27	L	2	1	2009
90	Sweden	Group A	5	31	L	1	-	2009
91	Hungary	Group A	17	5	W	3	1	2009
92	Denmark	S/F Plate	7	33	L	1	1	2009
93	Latvia	Final 7th	14	29	L	2	2	2009
94	Portugal	Group A	0	49	L	-	-	2009
95	Latvia	Group A	7	36	L	1	1	2009
96	Sweden	Group A	14	38	L	2	2	2009
97	Hungary	Group A	0	50	L	-	-	2009
98	Denmark	Final Bowl	0	27	L	-	-	2009
99	Spain	Group B	0	45	L	-	-	2010
100	Switzerland	Group B	21	33	L	3	3	2010
101	Czech Republic	Group B	5	40	L	1	-	2010
102	Andorra	Group B	5	19	L	1	-	2010
103	Norway	Final Bowl	12	24	L	2	1	2010
104	Italy	Group A	0	45	L	-	-	2010
105	Netherlands	Group A	0	61	L	-	-	2010
106	Croatia	Group A	7	21	L	1	1	2010
107	Serbia	Group A	19	33	L	3	2	2010
108	Bosnia and Herzegovina	Final Bowl	40	7	W	6	5	2010
109	Slovakia	Group B	45	5	W	7	5	2011
110	Monaco	Group B	19	5	W	3	2	2011
111	Greece	Group B	15	17	L	3	-	2011
112	Serbia	Group B	7	24	L	1	1	2011
113	Bosnia and Herzegovina	Group B	7	14	L	1	1	2011
114	Bulgaria	S/F Plate	0	19	L	-	-	2011
115	Monaco	Final 7th	19	24	L	3	2	2011
116	Croatia	Group A	5	47	L	1	-	2012
117	Greece	Group A	12	17	L	2	1	2012
118	Slovakia	Group A	12	24	L	2	1	2012
119	Monaco	Group A	14	19	L	2	2	2012
120	Hungary	Group A	7	24	L	1	1	2012
121	Switzerland	S/F Bowl	7	22	L	1	1	2012
122	Malta	Final 11th	47	7	W	7	6	2012
123	Azerbaijan	Group A	38	12	W	6	4	2013
124	Iceland	Group A	26	0	W	4	3	2013
125	Latvia	Group A	7	28	L	1	1	2013
126	Norway	S/F Cup	14	19	L	2	2	2013
127	Slovakia	Final 3rd	34	7	W	6	2	2013
128	Bosnia and Herzegovina	Group B	24	7	W	4	2	2014
129	Iceland	Group B	56	0	W	8	8	2014
130	Norway	Group B	12	28	L	2	1	2014
131	Czech Republic	S/F Cup	5	24	L	1	-	2014
132	Slovakia	Final 3rd	26	7	W	4	3	2014
133	Norway	Group B	28	7	W	4	4	2016
134	Bulgaria	Group B	38	10	W	6	4	2016
135	Croatia	Group B	15	7	W	3	-	2016
136	Turkey	Group B	26	17	W	4	3	2016
137	Serbia	S/F Cup	36	7	W	6	3	2016
138	Croatia	Final Cup	14	45	L	2	2	2016
139	Cyprus	Group A	21	21	D	3	3	2017
140	Moldova	Group A	35	0	W	5	5	2017
141	Lithuania	Group A	21	5	W	3	3	2017
142	Latvia	Q/F Cup	26	12	W	4	3	2017
143	Romania	S/F Cup	5	31	L	1		2017
144	Ukraine	Final 3rd	14	10	W	2	2	2017
145	Lithuania	Group C	21	28	L	3	3	2017
146	Moldova	Group C	26	0	W	4	3	2017
147	Ukraine	Group C	14	21	L	2	2	2017
148	Israel	Q/F Cup	15	10	W	3	-	2017
149	Sweden	S/F Cup	7	26	L	1	1	2017
150	Romania	Final 3rd	0	29	L	-	-	2017
151	Latvia	Group C	19	5	W	3	1	2018
152	Denmark	Group C	7	24	L	1	1	2018
153	Ukraine	Group C	12	20	L	2	1	2018
154	Romania	Q/F Cup	14	27	L	2	2	2018
155	Denmark	S/F Plate	7	17	L	1	1	2018
156	Croatia	7th Place	14	7	W	2	2	2018
157	Ukraine	Group A	5	5	D	1	-	2018
158	Romania	Group A	24	22	W	4	2	2018
159	Latvia	Group A	17	17	D	3	1	2018
160	Denmark	Q/F Cup	0	24	L	-	-	2018
161	Croatia	S/F Plate	24	21	W	4	2	2018
162	Lithuania	5th Place	5	22	L	1	-	2018
163	Latvia	Group A	28	0	W	4	4	2019
164	Bosnia and Herzegovina	Group A	19	14	W	3	2	2019
165	Sweden	Group A	0	29	L	0	0	2019
166	Lithuania	Q/F Cup	12	33	L	2	1	2019
167	Denmark	S/F Plate	5	7	L	1	0	2019
168	Sweden	7th Place	7	22	L	1	1	2019
169	Israel	Group B	15	12	W	3	0	2019
170	Ukraine	Group B	0	41	L	0	0	2019
171	Latvia	Group B	17	17	D	3	1	2019
172	Lithuania	Q/F Cup	7	38	L	1	1	2019
173	Denmark	S/F Plate	21	10	W	3	3	2019
174	Croatia	5th Place	0	31	L	0	0	2019

== See also ==
- Luxembourg Rugby Federation
- Rugby union in Luxembourg
- Luxembourg women's national rugby union team
- Luxembourg national rugby union team
