= Stade Boy Konen =

Sports venue in Luxembourg City, Luxembourg

Coordinates: 49°34′44″N 06°05′13″E

Stade Boy Konen is a sports venue in the Cessange district of Luxembourg City, in southern Luxembourg. It is located next to the Croix de Cessange, just outside the A6. Amongst other uses, it is used for rugby union, and is the home stadium of both the dominant Rugby Club Luxembourg and the Luxembourg national team.

It is named after René 'Boy' Konen, the Minister for Public Works under Pierre Werner and a member of Luxembourg City's communal council.
