= 1994–95 FIRA Preliminary Tournament =

1994–95 FIRA Tournament
- Date: 16 October 1994 – 27 May 1995
- Countries: Belgium; Czech Republic; Germany; Morocco; Netherlands; Portugal; Russia; Poland; Spain; Tunisia

Tournament statistics
- Matches played: 21

The 1995–97 FIRA Trophy (originally 1994–96) was arranged with a new format. In this season the schedules for France, Italy and Romania were modified to allow preparation for the 1995 Rugby World Cup, with a preliminary tournament being held for Division 1 only. The second tier teams played a tournament to qualify seven teams to the 1995–96 edition Trophy.

Seven teams (the first three of each pool) and the winner of a Play off between the two fourth-placed teams were admitted to the first division for the 1995–97 tournament.

== Pool A ==
Pos	Team	Pld	W	D	L	PF	PA	PD	Pts
1	Russia	4	4	0	0	106	52	+54	12
2	Poland	4	2	0	2	102	58	+44	8
3	Tunisia	4	2	0	2	59	65	−6	8
4	Belgium	4	1	0	3	44	92	−48	6
5	Netherlands	4	1	0	3	41	85	−44	6

Russia, Poland and Tunisia qualified for 1995–97 FIRA Trophy . Belgium entered Play-off.

15 October 1994

Poland	50–13	Belgium

Siedlce

22 October 1994

Russia	29–6	Netherlands

Fili Stadium, Moscow

12 November 1994

Belgium	10–0	Netherlands

Brussels

20 November 1994

Poland	9–15	Tunisia

-

22 March 1995

Belgium	6–10	Tunisia

Brussels

26 March 1995

Netherlands	23–18	Tunisia

Amsterdam

1 April 1995

Russia	27–16	Tunisia

23 April 1995

Netherlands	12–28	Poland

Amsterdam

6 May 1995

Russia	32–15	Belgium

Fili Stadium, Moscow

13 May 1995

Poland	15–18	Russia

== Pool B ==
Pos	Team	Pld	W	D	L	PF	PA	PD	Pts
1	Spain	4	4	0	0	213	36	+177	12
2	Portugal	4	3	0	1	86	100	−14	10
3	Morocco	4	2	0	2	60	89	−29	8
4	Czech Republic	4	1	0	3	51	132	−81	6
5	Germany	4	0	0	4	37	90	−53	4

Spain, Portugal and Marocco qualified for 1995–97 FIRA Trophy . Czech Republic entered Play-off.

23 October 1994

Czech Republic	12–5	Germany

Říčany

13 November 1994

Germany	10–29	Spain

Rudolf-Kalweit-Stadion, Hanover
Referee: (Romania) M. Paraschivescu

19 March 1995

Portugal	26–16	Morocco

Lisbon University Stadium, Lisbon

26 March 1995

Spain	44–3	Morocco

Polideportivo La Puntilla, El Puerto de Santa María

2 April 1995

Spain	90–8	Czech Republic

Campo Universitario, Madrid
Referee: (France) J. C. Gastou

9 April 1995

Morocco	18–13	Czech Republic

Casablanca

22 April 1995

Portugal	15–50	Spain
Try: Esteves, Murinello; Con: Gomes; Pen: Gomes		Try: Martín Illanes (2), Mino Terrancle, Puertas Soto, Villaú, Saenz Lobsack (2), penalty try Con: Puertas Soto, Gerendiaga Nanclares (4)

Lisbon University Stadium, Lisbon

29 April 1995

Czech Republic	18–19	Portugal

Tatra Smichov Rugby Club, Prague
Attendance: 600
Referee: (Italy) R. Faccioli

14 May 1995

Germany	16–26	Portugal

Fritz-Grunebaum-Sportpark, Heidelberg

6 May 1995

Morocco	23-6	Germany

Oujda

== Play Off ==
27 May 1995

Belgium	32–13	Czech Republic

Brussels

Belgium qualified for 1995–97 FIRA Trophy

== Second division ==
Three Pools were played.

=== Pool A ===
Pos	Team	Pld	W	D	L	PF	PA	PD	Pts
1	Latvia	3	2	0	1	67	53	+14	7
2	Denmark	2	2	0	0	39	25	+14	6
3	Ukraine	3	1	0	2	53	32	+21	5
4	Lithuania	2	0	0	2	10	59	−49	2

- Lithuania-Denmark not played

9 October 1994

Latvia	28–10	Lithuania

Riga

5 November 1994

Denmark	27–19	Latvia

Copenhagen

27 November 1994

Denmark	12–6	Ukraine

Aalborg

4 June 1995

Latvia	20–16	Ukraine

Riga

1995

Ukraine	31–0	Lithuania

Vilnius

=== Pool B ===
- Semifinals

23 March 1995

Bulgaria	8–70	Georgia

Sofia

23 March 1995

Moldova	17–14	Hungary

Sofia

- 3–4 place final

25 March 1995

Bulgaria	8–0	Hungary

Sofia

- Final

25 March 1995

Georgia	47–5	Moldova

Sofia

=== Pool C ===
Pos	Team	Pld	W	D	L	PF	PA	PD	Pts
1	Luxembourg	4	3	1	0	67	33	+34	11
2	Andorra	4	2	1	1	52	57	−5	9
3	Croatia	4	2	0	2	56	48	+8	8
4	Slovenia	4	2	0	2	67	81	−14	8
5	Switzerland	4	0	0	4	17	40	−23	4

15 October 1994

Luxembourg	22–3	Slovenia

Luxembourg

30 October 1994

Croatia	11–3	Switzerland

Makarska

2 November 1994

Slovenia	17–14	Switzerland

Ljubliana

26 November 1994

Andorra	28–23	Slovenia

Andorra

3 December 1994

Croatia	12–21	Luxembourg

Split

8 April 1995

Slovenia	24–17	Croatia

Ljubliana

22 April 1995

Andorra	0–16	Croatia

Andorra

30 April 1995

Luxembourg	6 – 0 withdraw	Switzerland

Luxembourg

7 May 1995

Andorra	6 – 0 withdraw	Switzerland

13 May 1995

Luxembourg	18–18	Andorra

Luxembourg
