= 1997–98 FIRA Tournament =

Rugby union tournament

- Date: 18 October 1997 – 2 June 1998

Tournament statistics
- Champions: Not awarded

The 1997–98 FIRA Tournament was a rugby union tournament organized by the Fédération Internationale de Rugby Amateur (FIRA). Only minnow teams participated because the 15 strongest European teams were playing the qualification for the 1999 Rugby World Cup.

The teams were divided into three pools, with the winners being Latvia, Luxembourg and Austria. No championship title was awarded.

== Pool "Silver" (Division 2) ==
Place	Nation	Games				Points			Table points
Place	Nation	played	won	drawn	lost	for	against	diff.	Table points
1	Latvia	4	3	0	1	54	43	+11	10
2	Lithuania	4	3	0	1	51	88	−37	10
3	Switzerland	4	2	0	2	102	64	+38	8
4	Yugoslavia	4	2	0	2	87	38	+49	7
5	Israel	4	0	0	4	9	70	−61	2

25 October 1997

Lithuania	25–23	Latvia

Vilnius

8 November 1997

Switzerland	29–13	Yugoslavia

Nyon

28 March 1998

Israel	3–34	Switzerland

Netanya

25 April 1998

Yugoslavia	30–6	Israel

Beograd

9 May 1998

Latvia	25–18	Switzerland

Riga

10 May 1998

Switzerland	21–23	Lithuania

Basel

20 May 1998

Yugoslavia	44–0	Lithuania

Beograd

30 May 1998

Latvia	3 – 0 withdraw	Israel

2 June 1998

Latvia	3 – 0 withdraw	Yugoslavia

Lithuania	3 – 0 withdraw	Israel

== Pool "Bronze" (Division 3) ==
Place	Nation	Games				Points			Table points
Place	Nation	played	won	drawn	lost	for	against	diff.	Table points
1	Luxembourg	3	3	0	0	79	23	+56	9
2	Bosnia and Herzegovina	3	2	0	1	49	43	+6	7
3	Monaco	3	1	0	2	49	56	−7	5
4	Bulgaria	3	0	0	3	27	82	−55	3

18 October 1997

Bulgaria	6–39	Luxembourg

Sofia

15 November 1997

Monaco	16–22	Bosnia and Herzegovina

Montecarlo

28 March 1998

Luxembourg	22–5	Bosnia and Herzegovina

18 April 1998

Luxembourg	18–12	Monaco

9 May 1998

Monaco	21–16	Bulgaria

13 May 1998

Bosnia and Herzegovina	22–5	Bulgaria

Zenica

== Pool "Bowl" (Division 4) ==
Place	Nation	Games				Points			Table points
Place	Nation	played	won	drawn	lost	for	against	diff.	Table points
1	Austria	2	2	0	0	74	15	+59	6
2	Slovenia	2	1	0	1	41	50	−9	4
3	Hungary	2	0	0	2	12	62	−50	2

18 April 1998

Slovenia	38–0	Hungary

Sofia

23 May 1998

Hungary	12–24	Austria

Montecarlo

6 June 1998

Austria	50–3	Slovenia

== Bibliography ==
- (in Italian) Francesco Volpe, Valerio Vecchiarelli (2000), 2000 Italia in Meta, Storia della nazionale italiana di rugby dagli albori al Sei Nazioni, GS Editore (2000) ISBN 88-87374-40-6.
- (in Italian) Francesco Volpe, Paolo Pacitti (Author), Rugby 2000, GTE Gruppo Editorale (1999).
- "Minor Tournaments FIRA Tournament 1997/98". The Rugby Archive. 19 December 2014. Archived from the original on 28 February 2022.
