= Luxembourg national rugby union team =

National rugby union team

Luxembourg
- Union: Luxembourg Rugby Federation
- Head coach: James Kent
- Captain: Hugo Bertani
- Most caps: Nigel Shaplin (51)
- Top scorer: Gilles Caviglia (288)
- Top try scorer: Steve Knowles; Adrien Timmermans (11)
- Home stadium: Stade de Luxembourg, Luxembourg City
First colours	Second colours	Third colours

World Rugby ranking
- Current: 56 (as of 22 October 2025)
- Highest: 53 (2024)
- Lowest: 94 (2008)

First international
- Belgium 28 – 6 Luxembourg; 3 May 1975

Biggest win
- Luxembourg 93 – 0 Estonia; 6 December 2025

Biggest defeat
- Luxembourg 3 – 116 Sweden; 5 May 2001
- Website: www.rugby.lu

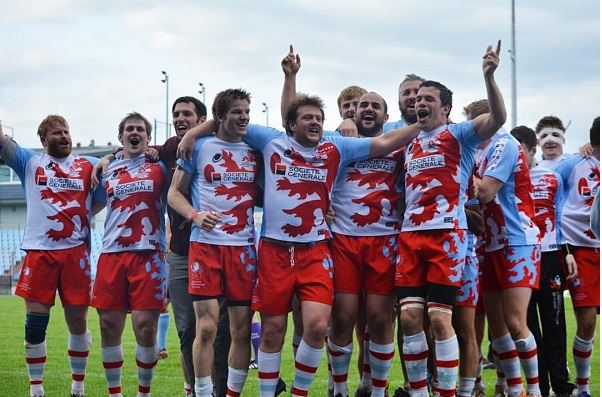
Luxemburg National Team

The Luxembourg national rugby union team is a minor team, and is ranked as a third tier nation. They are currently competing in the 2025-2026 Rugby Europe Conference. Since 1996 Luxembourg also competes in the sevens circuits in Europe Luxembourg national rugby sevens team.

Luxembourg has been a member of FIRA since 1976, two years after the founding of Luxembourg Rugby Federation (French: Fédération Luxembourgeoise de Rugby (FLR)). The Grand Duchy has participated several times in the FIRA championships and, despite the small size, has honourably acquitted itself. Luxembourg has also been a member of the International Rugby Board since 1991.

The Luxembourg rugby team is the only national sports team to have been three times champions of their group in a European competition. In 1995, more than 20 points scored against Slovenia at Cessange and more than 20 points scored in Split against Croatia and finally an excellent draw against Andorra in Luxembourg enabled them to be champions of their group. In 1997 they won the Bronze Cup with wins against Bosnia, Bulgaria and Monaco. Luxembourg has in their past encounter recorded a 10–10 draw against Georgia, but the best performance to date was a "Grand Slam" in 2004 in FIRA-AER European Cup division 3B. In the 2017–2018 campaign, Luxembourg won the Grand Slam against Denmark, Norway, Finland and Estonia in the Rugby Europe Conference 2 North, while also integrating several young players in the squad, and gained promotion to the Rugby Europe Conference 1 North for the 2018–2019 campaign.

They spent four consecutive seasons in Rugby Europe Conference North, surprising many by avoiding relegation. During this time they recorded impressive wins against higher-ranked Moldova, Hungary and Sweden.

In the 2023-24 Rugby Europe Championships, Luxembourg were drawn into Pool B in the Conference. They won all four matches by huge margins, defeating Hungary, Austria, Bosnia and Herzegovina, and Slovenia. Their 84–7 victory against Slovenia is the club's record largest win. Luxembourg secured promotion to the 2024-25 Rugby Europe Trophy after defeating Moldova 19–0 in a playoff match. It is the first time Luxembourg have played in this division and is also the highest level at which they have ever played.

The national side is ranked 53rd in the world (as of 17 August 2024).

== National clubs ==
The Rugby Club Luxembourg was founded in May 1973 by a group of expatriates working in the Grand Duchy. Several of the founders still live in Luxembourg and contribute one way or another to the sport. The club played its first competitive game against US Castillionnaise in September 1973. Up until 1995, the club played in the Alsace-Lorraine regional league. In that year, the team joined the Belgian second division, which it belonged to until 1998, when it earned promotion to the first division. In 2001, the club decided to return to the French league system, again playing regionally in Alsace-Lorraine. It won its division in 2008 but, after an invitation to play in Germany, decided to join the German league system in 2009. In the 2017–2018 season, RCL lead Bundesliga 2 West unbeaten and hoped to secure promotion to Bundesliga 1 for the 2018–2019 season.

De Rugby Club Walferdange was founded in 1990. In 2001, after 10 years in the Belgian League they finished top of the third division and champion during the 2002/03 season. In its first season in the second division, the club was relegated to 3rd Division. The club's objective having gone through a rebuilding phase, is to return to and remain in the Belgian 2nd division.

The Richard Mertens Club is a member of the European Community sports clubs (French: Cercle Sportif des Communautés Européennes) and concentrates on U-7/U-19, its goal being to promote the game of rugby in Luxembourg and act as a feeder club for the two senior clubs of Luxembourg with any talented players. Player retention remains a concern for Luxembourgish rugby with most of such players stopping the sport after school for various reasons, even if they remain in Luxembourg. Despite this, the school has had some success stories since its inception with a few of its past players having gone on to play for well known university and club sides, or having gone on to represent Luxembourg at the senior level.

In 2017, a fourth club was founded in the south of the country in Dudelange, Rugby Club Terres Rouge. The club exclusively caters for the youth; it has been implied by the founders that there is potential for founding a senior team.

A fifth club, the Rugby Eagles Luxembourg, was founded in 2019 and became an official Member of the Luxembourg Rugby Union in June 2020. This club is exclusively a child-centered rugby project.

== Statistics XV ==
=== Test Record ===
Below is a table of the representative rugby matches played by a Luxembourg national XV at test level up until 24 October 2026, updated after match with Norway.

Sortable and collapsible table
Opponent	Played	Won	Lost	Drawn	% Won
Andorra	5	1	3	1	20%
Armenia	1	0	1	0	0%
Austria	7	5	2	0	71.43%
Azerbaijan	1	1	0	0	100%
Belgium	4	0	4	0	0%
Bermuda	1	0	1	0	0%
Bosnia and Herzegovina	10	7	3	0	70%
Bulgaria	9	2	7	0	22.22%
Croatia	3	1	1	1	33.33%
Cyprus	2	0	2	0	0%
Czech Republic	5	0	5	0	0%
Denmark	5	3	2	0	60%
East Germany	1	1	0	0	100%
Estonia	3	3	0	0	100%
Finland	10	9	1	0	90%
Georgia	1	0	0	1	0%
Germany	2	0	2	0	0%
Greece	6	3	3	0	50%
Hungary	5	3	2	0	60%
Israel	9	3	6	0	33.33%
Latvia	5	1	4	0	20%
Lithuania	7	2	5	0	28.57%
Malta	1	0	1	0	0%
Moldova	3	2	1	0	66.67%
Monaco	2	1	0	1	50%
Norway	8	7	1	0	87.5%
Poland	1	0	1	0	0%
Serbia	2	2	0	0	100%
Slovenia	7	5	2	0	71.43%
Sweden	8	1	7	0	12.5%
Switzerland	5	1	4	0	20%
Tunisia	1	0	1	0	0%
Ukraine	1	0	1	0	0%
Yugoslavia	1	0	1	0	0%
Total	142	64	74	4	45.07%

=== Match Record XV ===
Sortable and collapsible table
#	Opponent	Year	Date	FLR	Opp	W/L/D	H/A	Season	T	C	P	DP	Competition	Coach	Captain	Comments
139	Norway	2026	17 October 2026	41	12	W	H	2026-2027	7	3	0	0	2026-27 Conference	Eugene Gillespie	H Bertani	Conference 2026-27
138	Estonia	2026	17 October 2026	105	3	W	A	2026-2027	16	13	0	0	2026-27 Conference	Eugene Gillespie	H Bertani	Conference 2026-27
137	Latvia	2026	18 April 2026	28	0	W	H	2025-2026	4	4	0	0	2025-26 Conference	James Kent	/	Forfeit win in Conference 2025-26
136	Estonia	2025	6 December 2025	93	0	W	H	2025-2026	15	9	0	0	2025-26 Conference	James Kent	H Bertani	Conference 2025-26
136	Norway	2025	18 October 2025	60	6	W	A	2025-2026	10	5	0	0	2025-26 Conference	James Kent	H Bertani	Conference 2025-26
135	Poland	2025	5 April 2025	10	33	L	H	2024-2025	2	0	0	0	2024-25 Trophy	James Kent	C Olsen	Trophy 2024-25
134	Sweden	2025	8 March 2025	18	57	L	H	2024-2025	2	1	2	0	2024-25 Trophy	James Kent	C Olsen	Trophy 2024-25
133	Czech Republic	2025	8 March 2025	16	40	L	A	2024-2025	1	1	3	0	2024-25 Trophy	James Kent	C Olsen	Trophy 2024-25
132	Croatia	2024	30 November 2024	31	31	D	H	2024-2025	4	4	1	0	2024-25 Trophy	James Kent	C Olsen	Trophy 2024-25
131	Lithuania	2024	26 October 2024	20	47	L	A	2024-2025	2	2	2	0	2024-25 Trophy	A Benedetti	C Olsen	Trophy 2024-25
130	Moldova	2024	25 May 2024	19	0	W	H	2023–2024	0	0	0	0	2023–24 Conference Play-off	A Benedetti	C Olsen	Conference Play-off 23-24
129	Slovenia	2024	20 April 2024	84	7	W	H	2023–2024	14	7	0	0	2023–24 Conference Pool B	A Benedetti	C Olsen	Conference Pool B 23-24
128	Hungary	2024	6 April 2024	18	15	W	A	2023–2024	2	1	2	0	2023–24 Conference Pool B	A Benedetti	C Olsen	Conference Pool B 23-24
127	Austria	2023	4 November 2023	27	14	W	H	2023–2024	4	2	1	0	2023–24 Conference Pool B	A Benedetti	C Olsen	Conference Pool B 23-24
126	Bosnia and Herzegovina	2023	14 October 2023	59	10	W	A	2023–2024	9	7	0	0	2023–24 Conference Pool B	A Benedetti	C Olsen	Conference Pool B 23-24
125	Latvia	2022	2 April 2022	9	32	L	A	2021–2022	0	0	3	0	2021–22 Conference 1 North	F Guillot	L Carrol	North 1 21–22
124	Hungary	2022	12 March 2022	30	23	W	H	2021–2022	3	3	3	0	2021–22 Conference 1 North	F Guillot	L Carrol	North 1 21–22
123	Czech Republic	2021	27 November 2021	12	39	L	H	2021–2022	0	0	4	0	2021–22 Conference 1 North	F Guillot	G Kimmel	North 1 21–22
122	Sweden	2021	23 October 2021	5	51	L	A	2021–2022	1	0	0	0	2021–22 Conference 1 North	F Guillot	C Sweetnam	North 1 21–22
121	Sweden	2019	2 November 2019	13	0	W	A	2019–2020	1	1	2	0	2019–20 Conference 1 North	Jon Flynn	R Kimmel	North 1 19–20
120	Czech Republic	2019	12 October 2019	7	36	L	H	2019–2020	1	1	0	0	2019–20 Conference 1 North	Jon Flynn	R Kimmel	North 1 19–20
119	Hungary	2019	5 April 2019	18	15	W	A	2018–2019	2	1	2	0	2018–19 Conference 1 North	Jon Flynn	M Dozin	North 1 18–19
118	Moldova	2019	13 April 2019	23	10	W	H	2018–2019	2	2	2	1	2018–19 Conference 1 North	Jon Flynn	R Kimmel	North 1 18–19
117	Sweden	2018	3 November 2018	9	10	L	H	2018–2019	0	0	3	0	2018–19 Conference 1 North	Jon Flynn	R Kimmel	North 1 18–19
116	Ukraine	2018	13 October 2018	13	24	L	A	2018–2019	1	1	2	0	2018–19 Conference 1 North	Jon Flynn	R Kimmel	North 1 18–19
115	Norway	2018	28 April 2018	35	16	W	H	2017–2018	3	1	6	0	2017–18 Conference 2 North	Jon Flynn	R Kimmel	North 2 17–18 Promotion
114	Finland	2018	14 April 2018	45	5	W	H	2017–2018	6	6	1	0	2017–18 Conference 2 North	Jon Flynn	R Kimmel	North 2 17–18
113	Estonia	2017	11 November 2017	64	0	W	H	2017–2018	10	7	0	0	2017–18 Conference 2 North	J Flynn	R Kimmel	North 2 17–18
112	Denmark	2017	14 October 2017	18	3	W	A	2017–2018	2	1	2	0	2017–18 Conference 2 North	J Flynn	R Kimmel	North 2 17–18
111	Czech Republic	2017	6 May 2017	3	33	L	H	2016–2017	0	0	1	0	2016–17 Conference 1 North	J Flynn	S Rezapour	North 1 16–17 Relegation
110	Lithuania	2017	22 April 2017	12	24	L	A	2016–2017	0	0	4	0	2016–17 Conference 1 North	J Flynn	S Rezapour	North 1 16–17
109	Sweden	2016	5 November 2016	0	19	L	H	2016–2017	0	0	0	0	2016–17 Conference 1 North	J Flynn	R Kimmel	North 1 16–17
108	Latvia	2016	22 October 2016	24	31	L	A	2016–2017	4	2	0	0	2016–17 Conference 1 North	J Flynn	S Rezapour	New ENC structure – North 1 16–17
107	Slovenia	2016	14 May 2016	29	10	W	H	2015–2016	2	2	5	0	2014–16 ENC 2C	J Flynn	S Rezapour	ENC 2C 14–16; Promotion
106	Denmark	2016	30 April 2016	19	14	W	A	2015–2016	2	0	3	0	2014–16 ENC 2C	J Flynn	S Rezapour	ENC 2C 14–16
105	Serbia	2015	14 November 2015	30	24	W	H	2015–2016	4	2	1	1	2014–16 ENC 2C	J Flynn	S Rezapour	ENC 2C 14–16
104	Austria	2015	24 October 2015	34	6	W	A	2015–2016	4	4	2	0	2014–16 ENC 2C	J Flynn	S Rezapour	ENC 2C 14–16
103	Denmark	2015	9 May 2015	13	5	W	H	2014–2015	2	0	1	0	2014–16 ENC 2C	M Davis	S Rezapour	ENC 2C 14–16
102	Slovenia	2015	8 April 2015	14	11	W	A	2014–2015	2	2	0	0	2014–16 ENC 2C	M Davis	S Rezapour	ENC 2C 14–16
101	Austria	2014	8 November 2014	18	13	W	H	2014–2015	2	1	2	0	2014–16 ENC 2C	M Davis	S Rezapour	ENC 2C 14–16
100	Serbia	2014	25 October 2014	36	0	W	A	2014–2015	5	4	1	0	2014–16 ENC 2C	M Davis	S Rezapour	ENC 2C 14–16
99	Finland	2014	10 May 2014	27	7	W	H	2013–2014	3	3	2	0	2012–14 ENC 2D	M Davis	S Rezapour	ENC 2D 12–14; Promotion
98	Greece	2014	26 April 2014	52	8	W	A	2013–2014	8	6	0	0	2012–14 ENC 2D	M Davis	S Rezapour	ENC 2D 12–14
97	Bosnia and Herzegovina	2013	9 November 2013	12	24	L	H	2013–2014	2	1	0	0	2012–14 ENC 2D	M Davis	S Rezapour	ENC 2D 12–14
96	Norway	2013	19 October 2013	9	7	W	A	2013–2014	0	0	3	0	2012–14 ENC 2D	M Davis	S Rezapour	ENC 2D 12–14
95	Israel	2013	5 October 2013	12	26	L	H	2013–2014	0	0	4	0	2015 Rugby World Cup R2	M Davis	S Rezapour	Match 2
94	Slovenia	2013	5 May 2013	22	10	W	H	2012–2013	4	1	0	0	2015 Rugby World Cup R1	M Davis	S Rezapour	Match 1
93	Greece	2013	20 April 2013	20	7	W	H	2012–2013	2	2	2	0	2012–14 ENC 2D	M Davis	S Rezapour	Qualified 2015 RWC R1 Mid Season Table; ENC 2D 12–14
92	Bosnia and Herzegovina	2013	13 April 2013	23	33	L	A	2012–2013	3	1	2	0	2012–14 ENC 2D	M Davis	S Rezapour	ENC 2D 12–14
91	Norway	2012	10 November 2012	15	8	W	H	2012–2013	3	0	0	0	2012–14 ENC 2D	M Davis	S Rezapour	ENC 2D 12–14
90	Finland	2012	6 October 2012	16	14	W	A	2012–2013	1	1	3	0	2012–14 ENC 2D	M Davis	S Rezapour	ENC 2D 12–14
89	Greece	2012	5 May 2012	15	8	W	H	2011–2012	0	0	5	0	2010–12 ENC 2D	M Davis	S Rezapour	5th in 2D ENC 2D 10–12
88	Finland	2012	21 April 2012	26	3	W	H	2011–2012	2	2	3	1	2010–12 ENC 2D	M Davis	S Rezapour	ENC 2D 10–12
87	Bulgaria	2011	22 October 2011	16	19	L	A	2011–2012	2	0	2	0	2010–12 ENC 2D	M Davis	C Ellis	ENC 2D 10–12
86	Cyprus	2011	8 October 2011	7	48	L	A	2011–2012	1	1	0	0	2010–12 ENC 2D	M Davis	C Ellis	ENC 2D 10–12
85	Cyprus	2011	7 May 2011	0	50	L	H	2010–2011	0	0	0	0	2010–12 ENC 2D	M Davis	S Rezapour	ENC 2D 10–12
84	Greece	2011	2 April 2011	18	30	L	A	2010–2011	2	1	2	0	2010–12 ENC 2D	M Davis	S Rezapour	ENC 2D 10–12
83	Bulgaria	2010	13 November 2010	8	18	L	H	2010–2011	1	0	1	0	2010–12 ENC 2D	M Davis	S Rezapour	ENC 2D 10–12
82	Finland	2010	9 October 2010	18	10	W	A	2010–2011	2	1	2	0	2010–12 ENC 2D	M Davis	S Rezapour	ENC 2D 10–12
81	Israel	2010	1 May 2010	17	19	L	H	2009–2010	2	2	1	0	2008–10 ENC 3C	M Davis	S Rezapour	4th in 3C; New FIRA-AER structure ENC 3C 08–10
80	Greece	2010	13 March 2010	9	17	L	A	2009–2010	0	0	3	0	2008–10 ENC 3C	M Davis	S Rezapour	ENC 3C 08–10
79	Finland	2009	7 November 2009	9	3	W	H	2009–2010	0	0	3	0	2008–10 ENC 3C	M Davis	S Rezapour	ENC 3C 08–10
78	Bulgaria	2009	24 October 2009	12	25	L	A	2009–2010	2	1	0	0	2008–10 ENC 3C	M Davis	S Rezapour	ENC 3C 08–10
77	Greece	2009	25 April 2009	14	17	L	H	2008–2009	1	0	3	0	2008–10 ENC 3C	M Davis	P Evans	ENC 3C 08–10
76	Israel	2009	21 March 2009	0	30	L	A	2008–2009	0	0	0	0	2008–10 ENC 3C	M Davis	P Evans	ENC 3C 08–10
75	Bulgaria	2008	29 November 2008	10	18	L	H	2008–2009	1	1	1	0	2008–10 ENC 3C	M Davis	S Rezapour	ENC 3C 08–10
74	Finland	2008	2 October 2008	27	19	W	A	2008–2009	2	1	5	0	2008–10 ENC 3C	M Davis	S Rezapour	ENC 3C 08–10
73	Finland	2008	24 May 2008	10	11	L	A	2007–2008	1	1	1	0	2006–2008 ENC 3C	M Davis	Z Neves Dos Santos	2nd in 3CENC 3C 06–08
72	Israel	2008	3 May 2008	12	20	L	A	2007–2008	2	1	0	0	2006–2008 ENC 3C	M Davis	Z Neves Dos Santos	ENC 3C 06–08
71	Slovenia	2008	19 April 2008	3	10	L	H	2007–2008	0	0	1	0	2006–2008 ENC 3C	M Davis	Z Neves Dos Santos	ENC 3C 06–08
70	Bosnia and Herzegovina	2007	27 October 2007	30	3	W	H	2007–2008	2	1	6	0	2006–2008 ENC 3C	M Davis	A Thompson	ENC 3C 06–08
69	Israel	2007	20 May 2007	22	15	W	H	2006–2007	3	2	1	0	2006–2008 ENC 3C	M Davis	A Thompson	ENC 3C 06–08
68	Slovenia	2007	5 May 2007	16	25	L	A	2006–2007	1	1	3	0	2006–2008 ENC 3C	M Davis	A Thompson	ENC 3C 06–08
67	Bosnia and Herzegovina	2007	21 April 2007	17	12	W	A	2006–2007	2	2	1	0	2006–2008 ENC 3C	M Davis	A Thompson	ENC 3C 06–08
66	Finland	2006	30 September 2006	16	8	W	H	2006–2007	1	1	3	0	2006–2008 ENC 3C	M Davis	A Thompson	ENC 3C 06–08
65	Norway	2006	6 May 2006	8	25	L	H	2005–2006	1	0	0	1	2005–2006 ENC 3C	M Davis	A Thompson	2nd in 3C ENC 3C 05–06
64	Azerbaijan	2006	29 April 2006	31	3	W	A	2005–2006	3	2	4	0	2005–2006 ENC 3C	M Davis	A Thompson	ENC 3C 05–06
63	Bosnia and Herzegovina	2005	12 November 2005	20	7	W	A	2005–2006	2	2	2	0	2005–2006 ENC 3C	M Davis	A Thompson	ENC 3C 05–06
62	Israel	2005	29 October 2005	19	3	W	H	2005–2006	1	1	4	0	2005–2006 ENC 3C	M Davis	A Thompson	ENC 3C 05–06
61	Armenia	2005	1 October 2005	12	39	L	H	2005–2006	0	0	3	1	2005–2006 ENC 3B/3C Playoff	M Davis	A Thompson	2nd Round ENC 3B/3C
60	Austria	2005	7 May 2005	9	11	L	H	2004–2005	0	0	3	0	2007 Rugby World Cup R2	M Davis	A Thompson	5th in Pool B – RWC 07
59	Moldova	2005	16 April 2005	6	55	L	A	2004–2005	0	0	2	0	2007 Rugby World Cup R2	M Davis	A Thompson	RWC 07
58	Germany	2004	27 November 2004	0	96	L	A	2004–2005	0	0	0	0	2007 Rugby World Cup R2	M Davis	A Thompson	RWC 07
57	Denmark	2004	13 November 2004	5	6	L	H	2004–2005	1	0	0	0	2007 Rugby World Cup R2	M Davis	A Thompson	RWC 07
56	Austria	2004	8 May 2004	19	18	W	A	2003–2004	1	1	4	0	2003–2004 ENC 3B	M Davis	A Van Zealand	1st Promotion to 3A – ENC 3B 03–04
55	Bulgaria	2004	24 April 2004	39	5	W	H	2003–2004	6	3	1	0	2003–2004 ENC 3B	M Davis	A Van Zealand	ENC 3B 03–04
54	Lithuania	2003	8 November 2003	9	8	W	H	2003–2004	0	0	3	0	2003–2004 ENC 3B	M Davis	A Van Zealand	ENC 3B 03–04
53	Bosnia and Herzegovina	2003	25 October 2003	31	8	W	A	2003–2004	3	2	4	0	2003–2004 ENC 3B	M Davis	A Van Zealand	ENC 3B 03–04
52	Lithuania	2003	24 May 2003	6	60	L	A	2002–2003	0	0	3	0	2002–2003 ENC 3B	M Gillies	P. Boeglin	3rd in Pool B – ENC 3B 02–03
51	Austria	2003	10 May 2003	25	14	W	H	2002–2003	3	2	2	0	2002–2003 ENC 3B	M Gillies	G Dubois	ENC 3B 02–03
50	Malta	2003	29/03/003	6	34	L	A	2002–2003	0	0	2	0	2002–2003 ENC 3B	M Gillies	G Dubois	ENC 3B 02–03
49	Bosnia and Herzegovina	2002	27 October 2002	21	5	W	H	2002–2003	3	3	0	0	2002–2003 ENC 3B	M Gillies	A Thompson	ENC 3B 02–03
48	Israel	2002	1 June 2002	31	19	W	H	2001–2002	5	3	0	0	2001–2002 ENC 3B	M Gillies	A Thompson	4th in Pool 2 (B) – ENC 3B 01–02
47	Lithuania	2002	4 May 2002	7	26	L	H	2001–2002	1	1	0	0	2001–2002 ENC 3B	M Gillies	S Focus	ENC 3B 01–02
46	Bosnia and Herzegovina	2001	27 October 2001	12	13	L	A	2001–2002	2	1	0	0	2001–2002 ENC 3B	M Gillies	S Williams	ENC 3B 01–02
45	Hungary	2001	6 October 2001	17	19	L	H	2001–2002	2	2	1	0	2001–2002 ENC 3B	M Gillies	S Williams	ENC 3B 01–02
44	Austria	2001	12 May 2001	0	77	L	A	2000–2001	0	0	0	0	2003 Rugby World Cup R1	A Tribellini	M Bus	5th in Pool A – RWC 03
43	Sweden	2001	5 May 2001	3	116	L	H	2000–2001	0	0	1	0	2003 Rugby World Cup R1	A Tribellini	S Focas	RWC 03
42	Israel	2001	3 March 2001	3	62	L	H	2000–2001	0	0	1	0	2003 Rugby World Cup R1	A Tribellini	S Focas	RWC 03
41	Latvia	2000	28 October 2000	19	24	L	A	2000–2001	3	2	0	0	2003 Rugby World Cup R1	G Brittin	A Thompson	RWC 03
40	Norway	2000	23 September 2000	41	9	W	A	2000–2001	6	5	0	0	2003 Rugby World Cup R1	G Brittin	A Thompson	First match of the entire 2003 Rugby World Cup; RWC 03
39	Lithuania	2000	13 May 2000	40	6	W	H	1999–2000	5	3	0	0	1999–2000 ENC 4	G Brittin	S Focus	2nd in Pool 3 – ENC 4C
38	Norway	2000	15 April 2000	78	12	W	H	1999–2000	12	6	2	0	1999–2000 ENC 4	G Brittin	S Focus	ENC 4C
37	Sweden	1999	23 October 1999	8	34	L	A	1999–2000	1	0	1	0	1999–2000 ENC 4	G Brittin	S Focus	ENC 4C
36	Tunisia	1999	1 May 1999	5	32	L	H	1998–1999	1	0	0	0	1998–1999 FIRA 3	G Brittin	R Stub	4th in "Silver" Pool 1 FIRA 3A Serbia and Montenegro match cancelled due to Kosovo War.
35	Belgium	1999	6 March 1999	8	38	L	A	1998–1999	1	0	1	0	1998–1999 FIRA 3	G Brittin	N Edwards	FIRA 3A
34	Germany	1998	25 October 1998	7	54	L	A	1998–1999	1	1	0	0	1998–1999 FIRA 3	G Brittin	R Stub	FIRA 3A
33	Monaco	1998	18 April 1998	18	12	W	H	1997–1998	2	1	2	0	1997–1998 FIRA 3	G Brittin	N Edwards	1st Place – "Bronze" Pool FIRA 3
32	Bosnia and Herzegovina	1998	28 March 1998	22	5	W	H	1997–1998	3	2	1	0	1997–1998 FIRA 3	G Brittin	S Williams	FIRA 3
31	Bulgaria	1997	18 October 1997	39	6	W	A	1997–1998	7	2	0	0	1997–1998 FIRA 3	G Brittin	N Edwards	FIRA 3
30	Sweden	1997	19 April 1997	5	48	L	A	1996–1997	1	0	0	0	1999 Rugby World Cup R1(A)	G Mallaby	J Jenkins	5th in Pool 3 – RWC 99
29	Andorra	1997	13 March 1997	16	30	L	H	1996–1997	1	0	0	0	1999 Rugby World Cup R1(A)	G Mallaby	G Paul	RWC 99
28	Hungary	1996	2 November 1996	3	12	L	H	1996–1997	0	0	1	0	1999 Rugby World Cup R1(A)	G Mallaby	G Paul	RWC 99
27	Lithuania	1996	5 October 1996	3	26	L	A	1996–1997	0	0	1	0	1999 Rugby World Cup R1(A)	G Mallaby	J Jenkins	RWC 99
26	Monaco	1996	4 May 1996	8	8	D	A	1995–1996	1	0	1	0	1995–1996 FIRA ?	M Gillies	N Edwards	Monaco's 1st Test match
25	Israel	1996	7 April 1996	12	20	L	A	1995–1996	0	0	4	0	1995–1996 FIRA 3	M Gillies	J Jenkins	3rd in Pool 3 – FIRA 3
24	Croatia	1995	28 October 1995	7	16	L	H	1995–1996	1	1	0	0	1995–1996 FIRA 3	M Gillies	T Whiteman	FIRA 3
23	Bermuda	1995	16 May 1995	0	28	L	H	1994–1995	0	0	0	0	Test Match	M Gillies	T Whiteman	
22	Andorra	1995	13 May 1995	18	18	D	H	1994–1995	0	0	5	1	1994–1995 FIRA 2	M Gillies	T Whiteman	1st Place Pool C – FIRA 2C
21	Switzerland	1995	30 April 1995	6	0	W	A	1994–1995	0	0	0	0	1994–1995 FIRA 2	M Gillies	T Whiteman	SUI forfeited the match as they were unable to host due to financial issues; FIRA 2C
20	Croatia	1994	3 December 1994	21	12	W	A	1994–1995	2	1	3	0	1994–1995 FIRA 2	M Gillies	M Gillies	FIRA 2C
19	Slovenia	1994	31 October 1994	22	3	W	H	1994–1995	3	2	1	0	1994–1995 FIRA 2	M Gillies	T Whiteman	FIRA 2C
18	Latvia	1994	14 May 1994	10	25	L	H	1993–1994	1	1	1	0	1993–1994 FIRA 3	M Gillies	M Gillies	4th in Pool A – FIRA 3C
17	Switzerland	1994	30 April 1994	8	17	L	H	1993–1994	1	1	1	0	1993–1994 FIRA 3	M Gillies	M Gillies	FIRA 3C
16	Georgia	1993	31 October 1993	10	10	D	H	1993–1994	1	1	1	0	1993–1994 FIRA 3	M Gillies	A Emering	FIRA 3C
15	Switzerland	1993	1 May 1993	10	37	L	A	1992–1993	1	1	1	0	1995 Rugby World Cup Prelim R	R Thurlow	A Emering	4th in West Group – RWC 95 FLR withdrew
14	Bulgaria	1993	1 March 1993	13	16	L	H	1992–1993	1	1	2	0	?1995 Rugby World Cup Prelim R/FIRA?	M Gillies	A Emering	West Group shows SUI, DEN, AND and LUX, maybe BUL friendly/playoff. 1st 5 pts try; Need to find.
13	Denmark	1992	17 October 1992	9	19	L	H	1992–1993	0	0	3	0	1995 Rugby World Cup Prelim R	R Thurlow	M Gillies	RWC 95; FLR withdrew
12	East Germany	1990	15 September 1990	17	9	W	H	1990–1991	3	1	1	0	?1990-91IRA?	I Bonallo	G Paul	Friendly? LUX or DDR not in 1990–92 FIRA Trophy DDR last match
11	Yugoslavia	1990	13 May 1990	6	28	L	H	1989–1990	0	0	2	0	1989–90 FIRA Trophy	I Bonallo	S Duncan	3rd in Division 3 – FIRA 3
10	Andorra	1990	29 April 1990	6	26	L	A	1989–1990	1	1	0	0	1989–90 FIRA Trophy	I Bonallo	S Duncan	FIRA 3
9	Bulgaria	1989	14 May 1989	4	13	L	A	1987–1989	1	0	0	0	1987–89 FIRA Trophy	S Rowlands	C Phipps	3rd in Division 3 – FIRA 3
8	Andorra	1989	23 April 1989	10	8	W	H	1987–1989	1	0	2	0	1987–89 FIRA Trophy	S Rowlands	C Phipps	FIRA 3
7	Bulgaria	1988	24 April 1988	4	14	L	H	1987–1989	1	0	0	0	1987–89 FIRA Trophy	S Rowlands	T Savage	FIRA 3
6	Andorra	1987	8 November 1987	3	24	L	A	1987–1989	0	0	0	1	1987–89 FIRA Trophy	S Rowlands	G Paul	FIRA 3
5	Switzerland	1980	19 April 1980	7	10	L	A	1979–1980	1	0	1	0	?1979–80 FIRA?	B Drake	F Mastroddi	Friendly? neither LUX or SUI are not in 1979–80 FIRA Trophy
4	Belgium	1979	19 May 1979	7	10	L	A	1978–1989	1	0	1	0	?1978–79 FIRA?	C Baldi	B Drake	Friendly? LUX not in 1978–79 FIRA Trophy
3	Switzerland	1977	14 May 1977	4	7	L	H	1976–1977	1	0	0	0	1976–77 FIRA Trophy	C Baldi	F Mastroddi	4th in Division 3 – FIRA 3 LUX never played YOU in their group
2	Belgium	1977	27 April 1977	3	24	L	H	1976–1977	0	0	1	0	1976–77 FIRA Trophy	C Baldi	A Binstead	Division 3 – FIRA 3
1	Belgium	1975	3 May 1975	6	28	L	A	1974–1975	1	1	0	0	?1975 FIRA?	R Marshall	F Mastroddi	4pts try, Friendly? LUX not in 1975–76 FIRA Trophy
Total				1,895	2,422				212	132	187	7				

== Career XV ==
View more additional detail Player Statistics

== Current Season XV ==
=== 2023-24 Rugby Europe Conference - Pool B ===
Champions and possibly advances to Promotion play-off

Place	Nation	Games				Points			TBP	LBP	GS	Table points
Place	Nation	Played	Won	Drawn	Lost	For	Against	Diff	TBP	LBP	GS	Table points
1	Luxembourg	4	4	0	0	190	46	+144	3	0	0	19
2	Hungary	4	2	0	2	133	70	+63	2	0	0	11
3	Austria	4	2	0	2	112	111	+1	2	0	0	10
4	Slovenia	4	2	0	2	72	151	-79	0	0	0	8
5	Bosnia and Herzegovina	4	0	0	4	57	186	-129	0	1	0	1
Source - Points were awarded to the teams as follows: Win – 4 points | Draw – 2 points | At least 3 more tries than opponent – 1 point | Loss within 7 points – 1 point | Completing a Grand Slam – 1 point

Matches

14 October 2023
14:00 CEST (UTC+2)

Bosnia and Herzegovina	10–59	Luxembourg (1 TBP)
	Report

Kamberovica Polje Stadium, Zenica
Attendance: 150
Referee: Andrei Gheorghe (Romania)

4 November 2023
18:00 CET (UTC+1)

(1 TBP) Luxembourg	27–14	Austria
	Report

Stade de Luxembourg, Gasperich
Attendance: 1,200
Referee: Kevin Jalibat (Switzerland)

6 April 2024
14:00 CEST (UTC+2)

(1 LBP) Hungary	15–18	Luxembourg
	Report

National Rugby Center, Budapest
Attendance: 400
Referee: Adele Robert (Belgium)

20 April 2024
18:00 CEST (UTC+2)

(1 TBP) Luxembourg	86–7	Slovenia
	Report

Stade de Luxembourg, Gasperich
Attendance: 1,250
Referee: Francisco Serra (Portugal)

=== Rugby Europe Conference promotion to Trophy play-off ===
25–26 May 2024
TBA

Luxembourg	19–0	Moldova

Stade de Luxembourg, Gasperich
Referee: TBA

=== Current squad ===
Players selected in Luxembourg's last four matches: 2025–26 Rugby Europe Conference against Norway (18 October 2025), Estonia (6 December 2025) and Finland (9 May 2026), and the 2026–27 Rugby Europe Conference match against Estonia (17 October 2026).

Player	Position	Club
Anton Agassi	Hooker	(Ireland) Midleton RFC
Julian Clavien Timon	Hooker	(Luxembourg) RC Walferdange
Quentin Dee	Hooker	(Luxembourg) RC Walferdange
Tristan Touzellier	Hooker	RC Luxembourg
Filipe Campos Madureira	Prop	(Luxembourg) RC Walferdange
Matthew Dennis-Soto	Prop	RC Luxembourg
Denis Logelin	Prop	RC Luxembourg
James O'Donoghue	Prop	RC Luxembourg
Domenico Orsino	Prop	(France) CS Bourgoin-Jallieu
Anthony Rossi	Prop	(France) SCAC Cusset
Thomas Verlaque	Prop	(England) Vale of Lune RUFC
Ruben Albstmeijer	Lock	(Netherlands) Amsterdamse AC
Peter Barton	Lock	RC Luxembourg
Edward Graybrook	Lock	(England) University of Essex
Melvil Ruppert	Lock	RC Luxembourg
Kai Sweetnam	Lock	(Netherlands) RC 't Gooi
Thomas Deom	Back row	(Luxembourg) RC Walferdange
Anthony Drennan	Back row	(England) Blackheath F.C.
Guillaume Kimmel	Back row	(France) RC Metz
Christian Olsen	Back row	RC Luxembourg
Gael Pujadas	Back row	(France) FC Villefranche-de-Lauragais
Noé Tropiano	Back row	RC Luxembourg
James Wheeler	Back row	RC Luxembourg
Oscar Whiteman	Back row	RC Luxembourg
Louis Darras	Scrum-half	(Switzerland) Grasshopper Zürich
Lucas Schmitt	Scrum-half	(Germany) TSV Handschuhsheim
Fintan Lawlor	Fly-half	(Portugal) Benfica Rugby
Adrián Méndez Elola	Fly-half	(Netherlands) Amsterdamse AC
Gauthier Barès	Centre	(France) US Bazas
Liam Carroll	Centre	(Scotland) Stirling County RFC
John Fitzpatrick	Centre	West of Scotland F.C.
Federico Inciarte	Centre	RC Luxembourg
Stuart Logier	Centre	(England) Northampton Demons
Alexandre Piquet	Centre	(Luxembourg) RC Walferdange
Callum Trees	Centre	(England) Wharfedale R.U.F.C.
Gauthier Fontanive	Wing	(Luxembourg) RC Walferdange
Matteo Franzina	Wing	(Spain) CR Sant Cugat
Bryan Haeck	Wing	(Luxembourg) RC Walferdange
Maxime Kenens	Wing	RC Luxembourg
Yared Ketema	Wing	RC Luxembourg
Luke Ng Yan Kwong	Wing	(France) CR Illkirch-Graffenstaden
William Verrinder	Wing	(England) Loughborough Students RUFC
Casmier Yandall	Wing	RC Luxembourg
Hugo Bertani	Fullback	(Spain) FC Barcelona Rugby

== See also ==
- Luxembourg Rugby Federation
- Rugby union in Luxembourg
- Luxembourg women's national rugby union team
- Luxembourg national rugby sevens team
- List of Luxembourg national rugby union players
- List of international rugby union families
- List of rugby union players by country

=== Clubs ===
- Rugby Club Luxembourg
- Rugby Club Walferdange
