= Luxembourg women's national rugby union team =

Luxembourg
- Union: Luxembourg Rugby Federation
First colours

World Rugby ranking
- Current: 64 (as of 2 March 2026)
- Highest: 59 (2023)
- Lowest: 64 (2026)

First international
- Luxembourg 0-73 Belgium (Leuven, Belgium 11 April 2007)

Biggest win
- Luxembourg 20-0 Serbia (Dendermonde, Belgium 13 April 2007)

Biggest defeat
- Belgium 73-0 Luxembourg (Leuven, Belgium 11 April 2007)

The Luxembourg women's national rugby union team represents Luxembourg at rugby union. The side first played in 2007.

== History ==
Luxembourg made their debut at the 2007 FIRA Women's European Championship, they played their first test against Belgium on 11 April 2007 at Leuven, Belgium. They lost three of their four matches, their only win was against Serbia who they kept scoreless in their 20–0 victory.

They last played on 28 October 2007 against Germany in Heidelberg, they lost 0–37.

== Results summary ==
(Full internationals only)

Rugby: Luxembourg internationals 2007-
Opponent	First game	Played	Won	Drawn	Lost	Percentage
Belgium	2007	1	0	0	1	0.00%
Finland	2007	1	0	0	1	0.00%
Germany	2007	1	0	0	1	0.00%
Romania	2007	1	0	0	1	0.00%
Serbia	2007	1	1	0	0	100.00%
Summary	2007	5	1	0	4	20.00%

== Results ==
=== Full internationals ===
Won	Lost	Draw

Test	Date	Opponent	PF	PA	Venue	Event
1	11 April 2007	Belgium	0	73	Leuven, Belgium	2007 FIRA Women's Championship
2	12 April 2007	Romania	0	38	Kituro (Brussels), Belgium	2007 FIRA Women's Championship
3	13 April 2007	Serbia	20	0	Dendermonde, Belgium	2007 FIRA Women's Championship
4	15 April 2007	Finland	7	14	Tervuren, Belgium	2007 FIRA Women's Championship
5	28 October 2007	Germany	0	37	Heidelberg	

=== Other matches ===
Date	Home	F	A	Opponent	Winner	Venue
28 November 2007	Luxembourg A	0	63	Germany A	Germany A	Heidelberg

== See also ==
- Luxembourg Rugby Federation
- Rugby union in Luxembourg
- Luxembourg national rugby union team
- Luxembourg national rugby sevens team

=== Clubs ===
- Rugby Club Luxembourg
- Rugby Club Walferdange
