= Rugby Club Luxembourg =

Luxembourgish rugby union club

- Full name: Rugby Club Luxembourg
- Union: Luxembourg Rugby Federation
- Founded: 1973
- Location: Luxembourg City, Luxembourg
- Ground: Stade Boy Konen
- President: Giulia Iannucci
- Coach: Antoine Alric
- Captain: Peter Barton
- League: Rugby-Bundesliga
1st kit	2nd kit

Official website
- www.rcl.lu

Rugby Club Luxembourg, abbreviated to RCL, is a rugby union club, based in Cessange, Luxembourg City, in southern Luxembourg. Luxembourg has no domestic league of its own, so RCL plays in neighbouring countries' leagues; they currently play in the German Rugby-Bundesliga, having previously competed in the Belgian and French National Leagues.

The club has grown rapidly in recent years, and now has over 500 members. Based at Stade Boy Konen, in Cessange, the club is looking to expand to two or three pitches to relieve excessive usage of Boy Konen. The club is widely held in regard as the premier club in Luxembourg having never lost the Luxembourg Cup, and continues to be the primary source of players for the Luxembourg national rugby union team.

== History ==
Founded in May 1973, RCL was the first Luxembourgish rugby club, established by a group of British expatriates working in Luxembourg City. The club consisted then and still does today of a mixture of nationalities, cultures, creeds, languages : Belgian, French, English, Irish, Welsh, Scottish, Australian, South African, Portuguese, Spanish, German, Dutch, Italian, Fijian, Norwegian, Luxembourgish, American, New Zealander, Ecuadorian, and Argentinian.

The club played its first competitive game against US Castillionnaise in September 1973. Up until 1995, the club played in the Alsace-Lorraine regional league and won the Alsace-Lorraine Cup in 1994. In that year, the team joined the Belgian second division, which it belonged to until 1998, when it earned promotion to the first division.

In 2001, the club decided to return to the French league system, again playing regionally in Alsace-Lorraine. It won its division in 2008 but, after an invitation to play in Germany, decided to join the German league system in 2009.

The inclusion of RCL in the 2009 promotion round to the 2nd Bundesliga caused some debate in regards to its legality, as the club had not qualified through the German league system and was not a member of any of the German regional rugby federations. However, RC Luxembourg's application was declared valid in regards to the German rugby federations rules and regulations and the team finished second in the promotion round, earning a place in the 2nd Bundesliga for 2009-10.

The club has in the past recruited several local sportsmen from other sports, including Stéphane Gillet, former Luxembourg national football team goalkeeper, as a back row. Prince Sébastien played for the club's under-20 team, and Grand Duke Henri visited the club to watch his youngest son play.

A league reform in 2012 allowed the club promotion to the Bundesliga after the league was expanded from ten to 24 teams. RCL finished fifth in their group in the 2012-13 season and failed to qualify for the championship round, instead entering the second tier DRV-Pokal, but eventually withdrawing from the competition in October 2012. The club's reserve team however continued to play in Germany, competing in the fourth tier Regionalliga. The team competed in the tier three 3. Liga in 2013–14 and won its division and the competition with a finals victory over TGS Hausen, earning promotion to the 2nd Rugby-Bundesliga.

In the 2014–15 season the club finished first in the 2nd Rugby-Bundesliga qualification round – West & 3rd in the south-west DRV-Pokal group and was knocked out by RC Leipzig in the quarter-finals of the play-offs after a first round victory over Veltener RC. The club won the western division of the 2. Bundesliga in 2015–16 and, after play-off victories over StuSta Munchen and München RFC, won its division and the 2nd Rugby-Bundesliga Championship for the first time in the club's history, securing promotion to the Rugby-Bundesliga.

In the 2016-2017 season the club played in the Rugby-Bundesliga but was relegated and for the 2017-2018 season will be playing in the 2. Rugby-Bundesliga with the aim of being promoted. After winning the Bundesliga 2 division West, RCL faced Rugby Club Rottweil, runners-up from Bundesliga 2 division South, in the semifinals of the promotion play-offs. RCL won the game 35-19 in front of a large crowd at Cessange, reaching the promotion final against StuSta Munich. RCL beat Munich 18-12, after leading 18-0 at half time, gaining promotion to Bundesliga 1 and now hopes to establish itself in the German topflight for the 2018-2019 season.

In July 2018, the construction of covered spectator stands began and was completed by September 2018, now offering seating opportunities and shelter to the fans and improving the atmosphere at home games. A long needed club house is being constructed at Stade Boy Konen.

In the 2018-2019 season, RCL were able to maintain their spot in Rugby-Bundesliga and have been competing in this league since. After the 2021-2022 RCL got relegated to the second division. In the 2022-2023 season, RCL reached the play-off finals, but lost the relegation game against RSV Cologne 12-13, and the second relegation game against RK Heusenstamm. The goal remains to be promoted to Bundesliga one after the 2023-2024 season.

== Results in the German League ==
Recent seasons of the club:

Year	Division	Tier	Position
2009–10	2nd Rugby-Bundesliga South/West	II	3rd
2010–11	2nd Rugby-Bundesliga South/West	II	2nd
2011–12	2nd Rugby-Bundesliga South/West	II	3rd — Promoted
2012–13	Rugby-Bundesliga qualification round – South	I	6th
2012–13	DRV-Pokal – South-West	II	withdrawn
2013–14	3rd Liga South/West — West division	III	Champions
2014–15	2nd Rugby-Bundesliga qualification round – West	II	1st
2014–15	DRV-Pokal – South-West	II	3rd — Quarter finals
2015–16	2nd Rugby-Bundesliga	II	Champions – Promoted
2016–17	Rugby-Bundesliga	I	Relegated

- In 2012 the Bundesliga was expanded from ten to 24 teams and the 2nd Bundesliga from 20 to 24 with the leagues divided into four regional divisions.

== Current squad ==
The Rugby Club Luxembourg squad for the 2026–27 Rugby-Bundesliga season
**Props**: (Portugal) **Bruno Rocha**; (Luxembourg) **Matthew Dennis-Soto**; (Luxembourg) **Denis Logelin**; (Luxembourg) **James O'Donoghue**; (Jamaica) **Rhys Brown**; (Fiji) Jone Bola; (Argentina) Raul Ageno; **Hookers**: (Luxembourg) **Tristan Touzellier**; (Belgium) Jean-Sébastien Lecat; (Italy) Davide Boero; **Locks**: (Luxembourg) **Peter Barton**; (Luxembourg) **Edward Graybrook**; (Luxembourg) **Melvil Ruppert**; (Luxembourg) **Hywel Churchill**; (Italy) Federico Di Giacomo; (South Africa) Jaco Gerber; (France) Gabriel Collin; (Argentina) Facundo Solveyra	**Back row**: (Luxembourg) **James Wheeler** (c); (Luxembourg) **Christian Olsen**; (Luxembourg) **Oscar Whiteman**; (Luxembourg) **Casmier Yandall**; (Luxembourg) **Noé Tropiano**; (Luxembourg) **Cameron Hobson**; (Ireland) Bilal Mu'azzam; (France) Gaspard Heckel; (Portugal) Frederico Silva; (Luxembourg) Eugene Louis Gillespie; **Scrum-halves**: (France) Léon Pelletier; (Luxembourg) Thomas Dunn; (Italy) Giacomo Carrera; **Fly-halves**: (New Zealand) Eamon Reily; (France) Nicolas Dorget^{*}	**Centres**: (Italy) Alessandro Martinotti; (Uruguay) Alfonso Schroeder; (Chile) Benjamin Grossling; (France) Dorian Terrou; (France) Gianni Carena; (Luxembourg) Henri Grange; **Wings**: (Luxembourg) **Maxim Kenens**; (Luxembourg) **Yared Ketema**; (Luxembourg) **William Verrinder**; (France) Maxime Baroux; (France) Thomas Glemain; (Luxembourg) François Videment; **Fullbacks**: (Luxembourg) **Federico Inciarte**
(c) denotes the team captain, **Bold** denotes internationally capped players.^{*} denotes players qualified to play for Luxembourg on residency or dual nationality.

== Honours ==
=== Luxembourg ===
- LuxCup
  - Winners: 2022, 2023, 2024

=== Germany ===
- 2. Rugby-Bundesliga
  - Champions: 2016, 2018
  - Runners-up: 2011
- 3. Liga Süd-West
  - Champions: 2014

=== France ===
- Alsace-Lorraine Cup
  - Winners: 1994

== Past Seasons ==
=== 2019–20 season ===
In a season cut short due to Covid, RCL had a mixed account. Following a slow start, losing 3 matches on the trot, RCL were able to beat RK Heuseunstamm away. Following this, they had several close losses. In 2020, RCL only fulfilled one promising fixture against league heavyweights SC Frankfurt 1880 before the Covid-19 pandemic forced the league to suspend all fixtures.

=== 2018–19 season ===
RCL won its season opener at home 37-14 against Neckersulm SU. In spring 2019, RCL achieved a surprise 12-29 away win against one of the German top teams RG Heidelberg, gaining a bonus point win. This was followed by another bonus point 39-17 win against RK Heusenstamm at home a week later. Beating former German Champion TV Pforzheim with a bonus point win at Stade Boy Konen, RCL secured a spot in the first Bundesliga for the 2019-2020 season.

The second team meanwhile came second in the Rheinlandpfalz/Luxembourg Regionalliga, behind fellow Luxembourg club Rugby Club Walferdange. Both teams qualified for the Bundesliga 2 play-offs.

=== 2017–18 season ===
In the 2016-2017 season the club played in the Rugby-Bundesliga but was relegated to the second division. The club's 1st 15 played the 2017-2018 season in the 2nd Rugby-Bundesliga with the aim of being promoted. After winning the Bundesliga 2 division West dominantly, RCL faced Rugby Club Rottweil, runners-up from Bundesliga 2 division South, in the semifinals of the promotion play-offs. RCL won the game 35-19 in front of a large crowd at Stade Boy Konen in Cessange, reaching the promotion final against StuSta Munich. RCL beat Munich 18-12, after leading 18-0 at half time, gaining promotion to Bundesliga 1 and now hopes to establish itself in the German topflight for the 2018-2019 season.

- Most Improved Player: Richard Mardsen
- Player of Year: William Browne

=== 2016–17 season ===
In the 2016-2017 season, the club played in the Rugby-Bundesliga but with a newly constructed side. Along with newly appointed coaches was relegated back to the second division in what proved to be a very tough season for the club.

=== 2015–16 season ===
This was a breakout year for the club as it realised its goals under captain Paul Remedi by actually winning promotion for the first time to Bundesliga 1 in 2015–16 and, after play-off victories over StuSta Munchen and München RFC, won its division with many standout performances and victories. The team built on the progress from the previous year and realised its goals in front of large crowds and support for the knockout stages in Cessange. Winning 2nd Rugby-Bundesliga Championship for the first time in the club's history, securing promotion to the Rugby-Bundesliga was a landmark achievement and a sign of real progress for the club.

- Clubman: Liam Fagan
- Most Improved Player: Raphael Wagner

=== 2014–15 season ===
In the 2014–15 season the club began a period of rebuilding & success under a new coaching ticket involving ex-players John Paul Keane and Liam Fagan, along with Matt Bloomer and strong support from Club President Mr. David Evans as well as the club committee. The first team finished first in the 2nd Rugby-Bundesliga qualification round – West & 3rd in the south-west DRV-Pokal group and was knocked out by a strong RC Leipzig side after an arduous journey to Leipzig in the quarter-finals of the play-offs following a first round victory over Veltener RC. The club won the western division of the 2. The club ran two senior mens and both teams competed with great team spirit in their respective leagues.

=== 2013-14 season ===
The season was marked by undefeated records for both teams. Stuart Kelly became the coach of the RCL 1st team and won the Bundesliga 3 South/West after defeating Hausen in the final, which led a promotion to Bundesliga 2. The second team also won the Rheinland-Pfalz regional league. Both teams finished the season without a loss, and player attendance at training was high.

- Clubman: Matt Wilson
- Most Improved Player: Maurizio Morkun
- Player of Year: Paul Remedi
- Hamish Irwin Award: Jeremy Ferre
- Patterson Cup: Christophe Beaubron

=== 2012–13 season ===
Following three top 3 finishes in the Bundesliga division 2 (South and West), a league reorganisation saw the 1st team being moved up into the Bundesliga 1 where the team struggled with the overall condition, size and skill of the teams they were up against, many of which are semi-professional. The players competed well but were a level below. As a result, the club management decided to withdraw the 1st team from the league.

- Clubman: Stuart Kelly
- Most Improved Player: Dario Pala
- Player of Year: Peter Hartmann
- Hamish Irwin Award: Matthieu Hommell
- Patterson Cup: Sophie Mansell

=== 2011–12 season ===
The club in the 2011-2012 season underwent a rebuilding phase following the departure of 12 starting 1st team players from the previous season, for various reasons. Enda Horan, previously the 2nd team coach, stepped up following the sudden departure of the previous coach, and in line with the desired direction of the club management, worked on creating a club mentality and instilling competition for 1st team spots with the 2nd team acting as a joint development side and a means for aspiring 1st team players to prove themselves. With only one coach in charge and many missing players, the season began very poorly by RCL standards with many of the 2nd team players from the previous season filling in the vacuum left by the departed players, and struggling to cope with the step up. Several new arrivals bolstered the player numbers, most notably Michael Cawley on placement from University College Dublin, who shortly after joining was identified by Horan as being the perfect man to lead the team as captain. With the increased player base and increased squad fitness, the standard of play grew again and some positives victories were recorded. Unfortunately Cawley was injured against TSV Handschuhsheim II and was ruled out for the remainder of the regular season, as such club and international veteran Stuart Kelly took over the captaincy.

- Clubman: Graham Goodhew
- Most Improved Player: Roman Zasadny
- Player of Year: Steven Clarke
- Hamish Irwin Award: Stuart Kelly
- Patterson Cup: Stuart Hamilton

=== 2010–11 season ===
- Clubman : Paul Sweetnam
- Most Improved Player: Marek Keller
- Player of Year: Laurent Jacquot
- Hamish Irwin Award: Steven Clarke
- Patterson Cup: Christophe Hoffman
- JPMorgan Cup: Alex van Zeeland

== See also ==
- Luxembourg national rugby union team
- Luxembourg Rugby Federation
- Rugby union in Luxembourg
- Luxembourg women's national rugby union team

=== Clubs ===
- Rugby Club Walferdange
