= Rugby Club Walferdange =

- Full name: Rugby Club Walferdange
- Union: Luxembourg Rugby Federation
- Founded: 1990
- Location: Walferdange, Luxembourg
- Ground(s): Stade Prince Henri
- President: (France) Christophe Carre
- Coach(es): (France) Jean-Jacques Oberst
- League(s): Belgian Fourth Division
Team kit

Official website
- [ www.walferdange-rugby.lu%20www.walferdange-rugby.lu]]

Rugby Club Walferdange, known as "De Renert", is a francophone rugby union club, based in Walferdange, in central Luxembourg. Luxembourg has no domestic league of its own, so De Renert plays in the German Regional Leagues.

Walferdange is the second Luxembourg rugby club alongside Rugby Club Luxembourg. The club was founded in 1990.

== See also ==
- Luxembourg national rugby union team
- Luxembourg Rugby Federation
- Rugby union in Luxembourg
- Luxembourg women's national rugby union team

=== Clubs ===
- Rugby Club Luxembourg
