= Rugby union in Luxembourg =

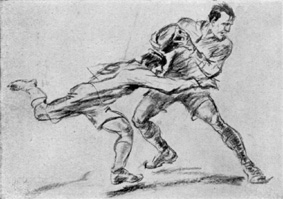
- The drawing Rugby by Luxembourgeois painter Jean Jacoby, which earned him a gold in a 1928 Olympic art competition.
- Country: Luxembourg
- Governing body: Fédération Luxembourgeoise de Rugby
- National team: Luxembourg
- First played: 1960s
- Registered players: 846 in 2019

National competitions
- Rugby World Cup; Rugby World Cup Sevens; IRB Sevens World Series; European Nations Cup

Rugby union in Luxembourg is a minor but growing sport.

== Governing body ==
The Fédération luxembourgeoise de rugby was founded in May 1973, and joined the IRB in 1991. It was created mainly by French and British expatriates, following the foundation of the first club of the country, the Rugby Club Luxembourg, because the club could not be officially recognised without a national federation.

== History ==
Rugby was introduced into Luxembourg in the late 1960s. They have traditionally seen themselves as rivals to Andorra, which is in a similar position to them - i.e. a small population, a growing interest in the game, plus the input of many foreigners working there in the finance industry. (Andorra was also to give Luxembourg its first international win, in 1989.)

Luxembourg played its first international in 1975, against Belgium, which they lost 28–6.

The first club, the Rugby Club de Luxembourg was established in the early 1970s, and plays in the Alsace-Lorraine section of the French leagues. A second club, De Renert Walferdange was created in 1990, and plays in the Belgian Championships.

Because it neighbours France, one of the world centres of rugby, and French media has strong penetration into Luxembourg, the game has enjoyed an inordinately high-profile. Its proximity to the British Isles has also helped, meaning that they sometimes receive touring clubs from the British Isles, more often than might be expected for a rugby nation of their calibre. Neighbours Belgium, and Germany, and near neighbours, the Netherlands also have thousands of registered players, and whose rugby tradition goes back before World War II.

In 2009, there were 2370 registered players in Luxembourg but this number decreased to 846 in 2019.

There were three formally organised clubs for seniors: De Renert, and the Rugby Club Luxembourg and a club exclusively for youths, the Cercle Sportif des Communautés Européennes Luxembourg (CSCE-Section Rugby). A fourth club was founded in 2017 in the South of the country in Dudelange, called Rugby Club Terres Rouge. At the moment, the club exclusively caters for the youth, but with the potential for founding a senior team. A fifth club, the Rugby Eagles Luxembourg, was founded in 2019 and became a Member of the Luxembourg Rugby Union in June 2020. This club is exclusively a child-centered rugby project.

== See also ==
- Luxembourg national rugby union team
- Luxembourg national rugby sevens team
- Luxembourg Rugby Federation
- Luxembourg women's national rugby union team
