= East Germany national rugby union team =

East Germany
- Union: Deutscher Rugby-Sportverband
- Nickname: East German National Team

First international
- Romania 64 - 26 East Germany (21 October 1951)

Largest win
- East Germany 28 - 0 Sweden (16 August 1964)

Largest defeat
- Poland 73 - 0 East Germany (1975)

The East Germany national rugby union team was the representative side of East Germany in rugby union during the country's existence from 1949 to 1990.

== East Germany internationals ==
East Germany played its first rugby international in 1951 in Bucharest against the Romanians, losing 26-64. The East Germans played against mostly Eastern Bloc countries, but they did play Netherlands (once), Sweden (three times), Denmark (twice) and Luxembourg (once). Their one-game against Luxembourg also happened to be their last, taking place shortly before the reunification of Germany in 1990. Despite requests from its West German counterpart, the East German rugby body, DTSB, refused to permit an international against West Germany to take place and the two teams never played each other over their 40-year history.

Internationals
Country	First Played	Games	Won	Drew	Lost
Romania	1951	14	0	1	13
Czechoslovakia	1956	16	3	2	11
Netherlands	1958	1	1	0	0
Poland	1958	13	2	1	10
Sweden	1964	3	3	0	0
Denmark	1964	2	2	0	0
Bulgaria	1976	14	9	0	5
Soviet Union	1978	2	0	0	2
Yugoslavia	1978	1	0	0	1
Hungary	1990	1	1	0	0
Luxembourg	1990	1	0	0	1
Overall		68	21	4	43

The team did not compete in the FIRA championship but did take part in a number of four-nation tournaments: 1961 in Brno, 1964 in Malmö, 1978, 1979 and 1983 in Bulgaria (Varna and Nesebar).

== Record ==
Below is a table of the representative rugby matches played by an East Germany national XV at test level up until 15 September 1990, updated after match with Luxembourg.

Opponent	Played	Won	Lost	Drawn	% Won
Bulgaria	23	10	13	0	43.48%
Czechoslovakia	16	2	12	2	12.5%
Denmark	2	2	0	0	100%
Hungary	1	1	0	0	100%
Luxembourg	1	0	1	0	0%
Netherlands	1	1	0	0	100%
Poland	21	3	17	1	14.29%
Romania	13	0	12	1	0%
Romania A	1	0	1	0	0%
Soviet Union	4	0	4	0	0%
Sweden	3	3	0	0	100%
Total	86	22	60	4	25.58%

=== GDR Coaches ===
The coaches of the GDR national team were the following:

Term	Name
1951–1972	Erwin Thiesies
1972–1983	Dr. Detlef Krüger
1983–1985	Gerhard Schubert
1985–1990	Rüdiger Tanke
1990	Peter Gellert
