= Luxembourg Rugby Federation =

Governing body for rugby union in Luxembourg

Fédération Luxembourgeoise de rugby
- Sport: Rugby union
- Founded: 1974; 51 years ago
- World Rugby affiliation: 1991
- Rugby Europe affiliation: 1976
- President: Jean-François Boulot
- Men's coach: Michel Frachat
- Website: www.rugby.lu

Luxembourg Rugby Federation (French: Fédération Luxembourgeoise de rugby) is the governing body for rugby union in Luxembourg. It was founded in 1974 and became affiliated to the International Rugby Board in 1991. Luxembourg Rugby team plays its matches at the Stade Josy Barthel in Luxembourg-City. Luxembourg are ranked 59th (on October 12, 2019) in the world according to the International Rugby Board.

== See also ==
- Luxembourg national rugby union team
- Luxembourg national rugby sevens team
- Rugby union in Luxembourg
- Luxembourg women's national rugby union team

=== Clubs ===
- Rugby Club Luxembourg
- Rugby Club Walferdange
- Cercle sportif des Communautés européennes - section Rugby
- Rugby Club Terres Rouges
- Rugby Eagles Luxembourg
