= Rugby Eagles Luxembourg =

Rugby club

- Full name: Rugby Eagles Luxembourg
- Union: Luxembourg Rugby Federation
- Founded: 2019
- Location: Kopstal-Bridel, Luxembourg
- President: Leticia Lucas

Official website
- www.rugbyeagles.lu

The Rugby Eagles Luxembourg are the fifth rugby club created in Luxembourg.

== Creation and approach ==
The Rugby Eagles Luxembourg is a rugby club in Luxembourg founded in 2019 and officially affiliated with the Luxembourg Rugby Union in July 2020. The Rugby Eagles Luxembourg are the fifth rugby club created in Luxembourg and they are based in the commune of Kopstal-Bridel, which is part of the Canton of Capellen in the southwestern part of Luxembourg-city.

The Rugby Eagles Luxembourg started their activities in the 2019-2020 season and their pedagogical approach is exclusively a child-centered rugby project. This approach mixes non-contact forms of rugby for youngster players with traditional forms of rugby for the more experienced players and uses a specific coaching method that helps children develop into autonomous, creative and decision-making players.

Since its inception, the Rugby Eagles Luxembourg has developed at a steady pace, reached more than 100 members during the 2022-2023 season and officially affiliated with the French Rugby Federation in October 2022.

== See also ==
- Luxembourg Rugby Federation
- Rugby union in Luxembourg
