= Greece national rugby union team =

National rugby union team

Greece
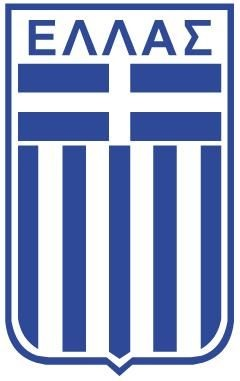
- Union: Greek Rugby Federation
- Head coach: Eleni Voultepsis
First colours	Second colours

World Rugby ranking
- Current: 111 (as of 4 November 2024)
- Highest: 107
- Lowest: 111 (2024)

First international
- Austria 52–3 Greece (Vienna, Austria; 22 October 2005)

Biggest win
- Greece 65–0 Kosovo (Keratsini, Greece; 10 October 2026)

Biggest defeat
- Cyprus 72–5 Greece (Paphos, Cyprus; 26 May 2012)

World Cup
- Appearances: 0

The Greece national rugby union team represents one of the world's newest rugby union playing nations. The national team is governed by the HRF (Hellenic Rugby Federation). Greece has been participating in international competitions since October 2005 playing its first international game against Austria in Vienna. Since then, they have played several international games in FIRA competition 3D, and in Greece. Greece played Slovakia in the Final on 12 May 2007 in Thessaloniki, where they won 20–17 and in doing so gained promotion to division 3C.

== History ==
It is unknown when rugby was first played in Greece. During the mid 19th century, English and French sailors are recorded as playing some of the earliest games in northern Greece.

After nearly 12 years without a test match due to a long sanction period brought on by governance and management issues, Greece played its first test match against Albania, on 22 November 2025.

As of 5 December 2025, Greece is a member of Rugby Europe.

== Record ==
Below is a table of the representative rugby matches played by a Greece national XV at test level up until 10 October 2026, updated after match with Kosovo.

Opponent	Played	Won	Lost	Drawn	% Won
Albania	1	0	1	0	0%
Austria	1	0	1	0	0%
Azerbaijan	2	2	0	0	100%
Bosnia and Herzegovina	2	2	0	0	100%
Bulgaria	4	2	2	0	50%
Cyprus	3	0	3	0	0%
Finland	8	3	5	0	37.5%
Israel	2	0	2	0	0%
Kosovo	2	2	0	0	100%
Luxembourg	6	3	3	0	50%
Monaco	1	1	0	0	100%
Norway	2	1	1	0	50%
Slovakia	1	1	0	0	100%
Total	35	17	18	0	48.57%

== Current squad ==
Squad to 2025 match against Albania.

- Anthony Quaglieri
- Apostolis Kalargaris
- Fotios Fotiadis
- Nikolaos Tzouvaras
- Irakli Sanikidze
- John Paul Papadimos
- Alexandros Anouar
- Christopher Evangelios
- Antonio Markakis
- Konstantinos Lagousis (C)
- Efraim Karapiperis
- Konstantinos El Azab
- Panagiotis Varypatis
- Thomas Zikos
- Nikos Davitadze

Reserves

- Achilefs Spanoudis
- Konstantinos Kalemkeridis
- Ioannis Pavlides
- Eduard Gaynor
- Christos Mendonis
- Dimitrios Stamoulis
- Georgios Tsouloufas
- Evaggelos Palogiannidis
