= Bulgaria national rugby union team =

National rugby union team

Bulgaria
- Union: Bulgarian Rugby Federation
- Head coach: Ivaylo Ivanov
- Captain: Petar Nikolov
First colours

World Rugby ranking
- Current: 73 (as of 8 June 2026)
- Highest: 59 (16 January 2023)
- Lowest: 74 (2026)

First international
- Bulgaria 3 - 70 Romania (Sofia, Bulgaria; 20 May 1963)

Biggest win
- Bulgaria 71 - 7 Serbia (Sofia, Bulgaria; 12 October 2019)

Biggest defeat
- Bulgaria 0 - 100 Romania (Burgas, Bulgaria; 21 September 1976)

The Bulgaria national rugby union team is governed by the Bulgarian Rugby Federation and has yet to qualify for the Rugby World Cup.

The national side is ranked 73rd in the world (as of 8 June 2026).

== History ==
Bulgaria played their first rugby international in 1963, where they met Romania. They were defeated by the Romanians, 70-3. There was no qualifying tournament held for the first Rugby World Cup, and Bulgaria did not attempt to qualify for the tournament until the Welsh hosted the 1999 Rugby World Cup. They competed in Pool 2 of Round A, but did not advance to the next stage.

Bulgaria again tried to qualify for the 2003 Rugby World Cup in Australia, and competed in Pool B of Round 1. Although Bulgaria won one pool match, they did not advance to Round 2. For the 2007 Rugby World Cup, Bulgaria were able to advance past Round 1, and entered Pool D of Round 2. However, they were then knocked out of the qualifying tournament.

== World Cup record ==
World Cup record
Year	Round	P	W	D	L	F	A
(Australia) (New Zealand) 1987	Not invited						
(United Kingdom) (Republic of Ireland) (France) 1991	Did not enter						
(South Africa) 1995	Did not enter						
(Wales) 1999	Did not qualify						
(Australia) 2003	Did not qualify						
(France) 2007	Did not qualify						
(New Zealand) 2011	Did not qualify						
(England) 2015	Did not qualify						
(Japan) 2019	Did not qualify						
(France) 2023	Did not qualify						
(Australia) 2027	Did not qualify						
Total	0/11	-	-	-	-	-	-

== Overall Record ==
Below is a table of the representative rugby matches played by a Bulgaria national XV at test level up until 3 October 2026, updated after match with Turkey.

Against	Played	Won	Lost	Drawn	Win percentage
Andorra	7	5	2	0	71.43%
Armenia	1	0	1	0	0%
Austria	5	2	3	0	40%
Bosnia and Herzegovina	7	4	3	0	57.14%
Croatia	2	0	2	0	0%
Cyprus	5	0	5	0	0%
Czechoslovakia	7	1	6	0	14.29%
Denmark	1	1	0	0	100%
East Germany	23	13	10	0	56.52%
Finland	9	8	1	0	88.89%
Georgia	1	0	1	0	0%
Greece	4	2	2	0	50%
Hungary	8	1	7	0	12.5%
Israel	6	2	4	0	33.33%
Italy	1	0	1	0	0%
Latvia	1	0	1	0	0%
Lithuania	5	0	4	1	0%
Luxembourg	9	7	2	0	77.78%
Malta	3	1	2	0	33.33%
Moldova	6	1	5	0	16.67%
Monaco	4	0	4	0	0%
Montenegro	2	1	1	0	50%
Netherlands	1	0	1	0	0%
Norway	7	3	4	0	42.86%
Poland	1	0	1	0	0%
Romania	2	0	2	0	0%
Serbia	5	4	1	0	80%
Serbia and Montenegro	1	0	1	0	0%
Slovakia	2	2	0	0	100%
Slovenia	5	3	2	0	60%
Soviet Union	1	0	1	0	0%
Spain	1	0	1	0	0%
Switzerland	6	1	5	0	16.67%
Turkey	8	5	2	1	62.5%
Ukraine	1	0	1	0	0%
Yugoslavia	7	2	5	0	28.57%
West Germany	1	0	1	0	0%
Total	166	69	95	2	41.57%

== Recent Squad ==
=== Previous squad ===
Squad to 2019 European Nations Cup - Division 2D.

- Georgi Gidionov
- Dimo Dimov
- Dimitar Georgiev
- Vladi Mihov
- Alex Tenev
- Tsvetomir Stoyanov
- Iliya Krastev
- Nikolay Hinov
- Denis Ivanov
- Borislav Borisov
- Kostadin Petkov
- Vasil Borisov
- Petar Nikolov (c)
- Tsvetostin Tsvetkov
- Ivailo Petrov
- Ivailo Ivanov
- Kristian Kotsev
- Kristian Pavlov
- Ricardo Attye
- Tsvetan Rashev
- Hristo Georgiev
- Smilko Debrenliev
- Deyan Parvanov
- Dimitar Kotsev
- Victor Iliev

== See also ==
- Rugby union in Bulgaria
