= 2003 in rugby union =

2003 in rugby union covers the major events in the sport of rugby union during the year. The main international tournament of the year was the 2003 Rugby World Cup, held in Australia from 10 October to 22 November. England won the tournament, defeating Australia 20–17 after extra time in the final to win their first Rugby World Cup title.

Earlier in the year, England also won the 2003 Six Nations Championship, completing the Grand Slam. In the southern hemisphere, New Zealand won the 2003 Tri Nations Series.

== International tournaments ==
=== Worldwide ===
- 22 February – 24 May: 2003 Super 12 season — [[Blues (rugby union)|Auckland Blues]] defeated the Crusaders 21–17 in the final to win their third Super 12 title.
- 15 February – 30 March: 2003 Six Nations Championship — England won the Championship and completed the Grand Slam.
- 24 May: 2002–03 Heineken Cup — Stade Toulousain defeated Perpignan 22–17 in the final at Lansdowne Road, Dublin.
- 25 May: 2002–03 European Challenge Cup — London Wasps defeated Bath in the final at the Madejski Stadium, Reading.
- 25 May: 2002–03 European Shield — Castres Olympique defeated Caerphilly RFC in the final.
- 28 June – 26 July: 2003 Tri Nations Series — New Zealand won the tournament.
- 10 October – 22 November: 2003 Rugby World Cup in Australia — England defeated Australia 20–17 after extra time in the final to win their first Rugby World Cup title.

== International results ==
Complete list of fixtures involving national teams during 2003.

=== February ===
Date	Match	Venue	Result	Competition	Source
15 February	Italy – Wales	Stadio Flaminio, Rome	30–22	Six Nations Championship	
15 February	England – France	Twickenham Stadium, London	25–17	Six Nations Championship	
16 February	Portugal – (Georgia (country)) Georgia	Lisbon University Stadium, Lisbon	34–30	European Nations Cup	
16 February	Spain – Russia	Inca, Mallorca	19–52	European Nations Cup	
16 February	Scotland – Ireland	Murrayfield Stadium, Edinburgh	6–36	Six Nations Championship	
22 February	Italy – Ireland	Stadio Flaminio, Rome	13–37	Six Nations Championship	
22 February	Wales – England	Millennium Stadium, Cardiff	9–26	Six Nations Championship	
22 February	(Georgia (country)) Georgia – Spain	Boris Paichadze National Stadium, Tbilisi	34–3	European Nations Cup	
22 February	Portugal – Romania	Lisbon University Stadium, Lisbon	16–15	European Nations Cup	
23 February	France – Scotland	Stade de France, Saint-Denis	38–3	Six Nations Championship	

=== March ===
Date	Match	Venue	Result	Competition	Source
8 March	Scotland – Wales	Murrayfield Stadium, Edinburgh	30–22	Six Nations Championship	
8 March	Ireland – France	Lansdowne Road, Dublin	15–12	Six Nations Championship	
8 March	Russia – (Georgia (country)) Georgia	Yunost Stadium, Krasnodar	17–23	European Nations Cup First Division	
8 March	Portugal – Czech Republic	Lisbon University Stadium, Lisbon	43–10	European Nations Cup First Division	
8 March	Switzerland – Belgium	Basel	9–6	European Nations Cup Second Division	
9 March	England – Italy	Twickenham Stadium, London	40–5	Six Nations Championship	
9 March	Spain – Romania	Campo Universitario, Madrid	6–31	European Nations Cup First Division	
9 March	Germany – Netherlands	Hannover	15–3	European Nations Cup Second Division	
15 March	South Korea – Tonga	Seoul	0–75	Rugby World Cup repechage qualification	
15 March	Spain – Tunisia	Stade Évelyne-Jean-Baylet, Valence d'Agen	33–16	Rugby World Cup repechage qualification	
21 March	Tonga – South Korea	Teufaiva Sport Stadium, Nuku'alofa	119–0	Rugby World Cup repechage qualification	
22 March	Wales – Ireland	Millennium Stadium, Cardiff	24–25	Six Nations Championship	
22 March	England – Scotland	Twickenham Stadium, London	40–9	Six Nations Championship	
22 March	Romania – Russia	Dinamo Stadium, Bucharest	23–12	European Nations Cup First Division	
22 March	Czech Republic – (Georgia (country)) Georgia	Tatra Smíchov Rugby Club, Prague	15–30	European Nations Cup First Division	
23 March	Portugal – Spain	Estádio Municipal de Coimbra, Coimbra	35–16	European Nations Cup First Division	
23 March	France – Italy	Stadio Flaminio, Rome	53–17	Six Nations Championship	
23 March	Paraguay – Brazil	Asunción	27–16	South American Rugby Championship "A"	
29 March	Russia – Portugal	Yunost Stadium, Krasnodar	14–25	European Nations Cup First Division	
29 March	Poland – Germany	Gdynia	15–37	European Nations Cup Second Division	
29 March	Malta – Luxembourg	Marsa	34–6	European Nations Cup Third Division	
29 March	France – Wales	Stade de France, Saint-Denis	33–5	Six Nations Championship	
29 March	Scotland – Italy	Murrayfield Stadium, Edinburgh	33–25	Six Nations Championship	
30 March	Spain – Czech Republic	Campo Universitario, Madrid	38–40	European Nations Cup First Division	
30 March	Ireland – England	Lansdowne Road, Dublin	6–42	Six Nations Championship	

=== April ===
Date	Match	Venue	Result	Competition	Source
5 April	Belgium – Slovenia	Liège	24–33	European Nations Cup Second Division	
5 April	Bosnia and Herzegovina – Malta	Zenica	14–20	European Nations Cup Third Division	
12 April	Spain – United States	Estadio Nacional Complutense, Madrid	13–62	Rugby World Cup repechage qualification	
18 April	Sri Lanka – (Cooperation Council for the Arab States of the Gulf) Arabian Gulf	Colombo	25–48	ARFU Asian Rugby Series	
18 April	Japan XV – (Cooperation Council for the Arab States of the Gulf) Arabian Gulf	Colombo	79–5	ARFU Asian Rugby Series	
22 April	Sri Lanka – Japan XV	Colombo	8–36	ARFU Asian Rugby Series	
26 April	Belgium – Denmark	Brussels	6–6	European Nations Cup Second Division	
26 April	Hungary – Serbia and Montenegro	Esztergom	47–23	European Nations Cup Third Division	
26 April	Latvia – Moldova	Riga	43–0	European Nations Cup Third Division	
27 April	Uruguay – Chile	Montevideo	20–13	South American Rugby Championship "A"	
27 April	Argentina XV – Paraguay	Montevideo	144–0	South American Rugby Championship "A"	
27 April	United States – Spain	Lockhart Stadium, Fort Lauderdale	58–13	Rugby World Cup repechage qualification	
27 April	Germany – Sweden	Trelleborg	24–16	European Nations Cup Second Division	
27 April	Netherlands – Ukraine	Amsterdam	18–24	European Nations Cup Second Division	
30 April	Argentina XV – Chile	Montevideo	49–3	South American Rugby Championship "A"	
30 April	Uruguay – Paraguay	Montevideo	53–7	South American Rugby Championship "A"	

=== May ===
Date	Match	Venue	Result	Competition	Source
3 May	Netherlands – Sweden	Amsterdam	39–26	European Nations Cup Second Division	
3 May	Denmark – Croatia	Copenhagen	8–8	European Nations Cup Second Division	
3 May	Serbia and Montenegro – Latvia	Belgrade	18–29	European Nations Cup Third Division	
3 May	Chile – Paraguay	Estadio Luis Franzini, Montevideo	102–0	South American Rugby Championship "A"	
3 May	Argentina – Uruguay	Estadio Luis Franzini, Montevideo	32–0	South American Rugby Championship "A"	
10 May	Poland – Netherlands	Gdynia	13–13	European Nations Cup Second Division	
10 May	Slovenia – Switzerland	Ljubljana	23–23	European Nations Cup Second Division	
10 May	Moldova – Hungary	Chișinău	47–11	European Nations Cup Third Division	
10 May	Luxembourg – Austria	Cessange	25–14	European Nations Cup Third Division	
10 May	Zambia – Zimbabwe	Luanshya	17–8	Friendly	
17 May	United States – Japan	Boxer Stadium, San Francisco	69–27	Super Powers Cup	
24 May	Ukraine – Sweden	Kyiv	37–0	European Nations Cup Second Division	
24 May	Moldova – Serbia and Montenegro	Chișinău	17–17	European Nations Cup Third Division	
24 May	Lithuania – Luxembourg	Klaipėda	60–6	European Nations Cup Third Division	
24 May	Kenya – Zimbabwe	RFUEA Ground, Nairobi	32–24	Friendly	
25 May	Japan – Russia	Chichibunomiya Rugby Stadium, Tokyo	34–43	Super Powers Cup	

=== June ===
Date	Match	Venue	Result	Competition	Source
1 June	Ivory Coast – Morocco	Abidjan	16–18	Africa Cup	
5 June	Israel – Norway	Ibiza	30–13	European Nations Cup Third Division, semi-final	
5 June	Bulgaria – Finland	Ibiza	42–3	European Nations Cup Third Division, semi-final	
7 June	South Africa – Scotland	Kings Park Stadium, Durban	29–25	Friendly	
7 June	Australia – Ireland	Subiaco Oval, Perth	45–16	Lansdowne Cup	
7 June	Bosnia and Herzegovina – Lithuania	Zenica	15–37	European Nations Cup Third Division	
7 June	Finland – Norway	Ibiza	20–55	European Nations Cup Third Division, third-place play-off	
7 June	Israel – Bulgaria	Ibiza	23–25	European Nations Cup Third Division, final	
8 June	Japan – Australia A	Chichibunomiya Rugby Stadium, Tokyo	15–66	Friendly	
14 June	New Zealand – England	Wellington Regional Stadium, Wellington	13–15	Friendly	
14 June	South Africa – Scotland	Ellis Park Stadium, Johannesburg	28–19	Friendly	
14 June	Argentina – France	José Amalfitani Stadium, Buenos Aires	10–6	Friendly	
14 June	Australia – Wales	Stadium Australia, Sydney	30–10	Friendly	
14 June	Tonga – Ireland	Teufaiva Sport Stadium, Nuku'alofa	19–40	Friendly	
14 June	Canada – England A	Thunderbird Stadium, Vancouver	7–43	Churchill Cup	
14 June	Romania – England Counties	Stadionul Arcul de Triumf, Bucharest	45–23	Friendly	
14 June	Czech Republic – Russia	Prague	27–13	European Nations Cup First Division	
14 June	Austria – Bosnia and Herzegovina	Vienna	25–6	European Nations Cup Third Division	
14 June	Uganda – Kenya	Kampala	21–22	Friendly	
14 June	(The Bahamas) Bahamas – Cayman Islands	Nassau	7–13	Friendly	
15 June	Japan – South Korea	Osaka	86–3	Friendly	
18 June	Canada – United States	Thunderbird Stadium, Vancouver	11–16	Churchill Cup	
20 June	Argentina – France	José Amalfitani Stadium, Buenos Aires	32–33	Friendly	
20 June	Samoa – Ireland	Apia Park, Apia	12–40	Friendly	
21 June	New Zealand – Wales	Waikato Stadium, Hamilton	55–3	Friendly	
21 June	Australia – England	Docklands Stadium, Melbourne	14–25	Cook Cup	
21 June	(Canada) United States – England A	Thunderbird Stadium, Vancouver	10–36	Churchill Cup	
21 June	Czech Republic – Romania	Prague	5–42	European Nations Cup First Division	
21 June	Malaysia – Chinese Taipei	Kuala Lumpur	0–54	ARFU Asian Rugby Series	
21 June	Singapore – India	Singapore	71–0	ARFU Asian Rugby Series	
24 June	Malaysia – India	Singapore	20–13	ARFU Asian Rugby Series	
28 June	New Zealand – France	Lancaster Park, Christchurch	31–23	Friendly	
28 June	South Africa – Argentina	EPRU Stadium, Port Elizabeth	26–25	Friendly	
28 June	(Canada) United States – England A	Thunderbird Stadium, Vancouver	6–43	Churchill Cup, final	
28 June	Singapore – Malaysia	Singapore	31–13	ARFU Asian Rugby Series	

=== July ===
Date	Match	Venue	Result	Competition	Source
3 July	Japan – England A	Ajinomoto Stadium, Tokyo	10–37	Friendly	
4 July	Fiji – Tonga	Prince Charles Park, Nadi	34–31	Friendly	
5 July	Namibia – South Africa A	Hage Geingob Stadium, Windhoek	9–25	Friendly	
5 July	Uganda – Zimbabwe	Kyadondo Rugby Club, Kampala	25–3	Africa Cup	
6 July	Japan – England A	Japan National Stadium, Tokyo	20–55	Friendly	
11 July	Tonga – Fiji	Teufaiva Sport Stadium, Nuku'alofa	23–22	Friendly	
12 July	South Africa – Australia	Newlands Stadium, Cape Town	26–22	Tri Nations	
12 July	Namibia – Samoa	Hage Geingob Stadium, Windhoek	13–40	Friendly	
12 July	Namibia A – Botswana	Hage Geingob Stadium, Windhoek	62–17	Africa Cup	
19 July	South Africa – New Zealand	Loftus Versfeld Stadium, Pretoria	16–52	Tri Nations	
19 July	Russia – (United States) USA Selects	Central Stadium, Krasnoyarsk	30–21	Super Powers Cup	
19 July	Zimbabwe – Madagascar	Harare	0–21	Africa Cup	
26 July	Australia – New Zealand	Telstra Stadium, Sydney	21–50	Tri Nations, Bledisloe Cup	

=== August ===
Date	Match	Venue	Result	Competition	Source
2 August	Australia – South Africa	Suncorp Stadium, Brisbane	29–9	Tri Nations	
2 August	Canada – New Zealand Māori	York Stadium, Toronto	9–30	Friendly	
2 August	Botswana – Kenya	Gaborone	9–80	Africa Cup	
2 August	Madagascar – Uganda	Antananarivo	32–30	Africa Cup	
9 August	New Zealand – South Africa	Carisbrook, Dunedin	19–11	Tri Nations	
16 August	New Zealand – Australia	Eden Park, Auckland	21–17	Tri Nations, Bledisloe Cup	
16 August	Ireland – Wales	Lansdowne Road, Dublin	35–12	Friendly	
16 August	Kenya – Namibia	RFUEA Ground, Nairobi	10–32	Africa Cup	
18 August	Argentina – Fiji	Estadio Olímpico Córdoba, Córdoba	49–30	Friendly	
22 August	France – Romania	Stade Félix-Bollaert, Lens	56–8	Friendly	
23 August	Wales – England	Millennium Stadium, Cardiff	9–43	Friendly	
23 August	Scotland – Italy	Murrayfield Stadium, Edinburgh	47–15	Friendly	
23 August	Argentina – United States	Buenos Aires Cricket & Rugby Club, Buenos Aires	42–8	Pan-American Championship	
23 August	Canada – Uruguay	Buenos Aires Cricket & Rugby Club, Buenos Aires	21–11	Pan-American Championship	
25 August	Chile – Fiji	Santiago	16–41	Friendly	
27 August	Wales – Romania	Racecourse Ground, Wrexham	54–8	Friendly	
27 August	Argentina – Uruguay	Buenos Aires Cricket & Rugby Club, Buenos Aires	57–0	Pan-American Championship	
27 August	(Argentina) United States – Canada	Club Atlético San Isidro, Buenos Aires	35–20	Pan-American Championship	
29 August	Niue – New Caledonia	Auckland	38–14	Oceania Cup	
30 August	France – England	Stade Vélodrome, Marseille	17–16	Friendly	
30 August	Ireland – Italy	Lansdowne Road, Dublin	61–6	Friendly	
30 August	Wales – Scotland	Millennium Stadium, Cardiff	23–9	Friendly	
30 August	Uruguay – United States	Buenos Aires Cricket & Rugby Club, Buenos Aires	17–31	Pan-American Championship	
30 August	Argentina – Canada	Buenos Aires Cricket & Rugby Club, Buenos Aires	62–22	Pan-American Championship	
30 August	Cook Islands – (French Polynesia) Tahiti	Auckland	56–18	Oceania Cup	
31 August	Namibia – Uganda	Hage Geingob Stadium, Windhoek	82–13	Africa Cup	

=== September ===
Date	Match	Venue	Result	Competition	Source
3 September	Niue – (French Polynesia) Tahiti	Auckland	78–8	Oceania Cup	
3 September	Cook Islands – New Caledonia	Auckland	55–5	Oceania Cup	
6 September	England – France	Twickenham Stadium, London	45–14	Rugby World Cup warm-up match	
6 September	Italy – (Georgia (country)) Georgia	Stadio Comunale Censin Bosia, Asti	31–22	Rugby World Cup warm-up match	
6 September	Scotland – Ireland	Murrayfield Stadium, Edinburgh	10–29	Rugby World Cup warm-up match	
6 September	Niue – Cook Islands	Auckland	17–14	Oceania Cup, Eastern Zone, final	
6 September	(French Polynesia) Tahiti – New Caledonia	Auckland	18–17	Oceania Cup, Eastern Zone, third-place match	
9 September	Zambia – Rwanda	Lusaka	107–9	Africa Cup, second division	
11 September	Uganda U23 – Burundi	Lusaka	100–0	Africa Cup, second division	
13 September	Zambia – Uganda U23	Lusaka	44–17	Africa Cup, second division	
13 September	Rwanda – Burundi	Lusaka	18–5	Africa Cup, second division	
13 September	Hong Kong – (Chinese Taipei) Taiwan	King's Park Sports Ground, Hong Kong	21–19	Friendly	
21 September	Colombia – Peru	Bogotá	22–17	South American Rugby Championship "B"	
21 September	Venezuela – Brazil	Bogotá	32–26	South American Rugby Championship "B"	
24 September	Brazil – Colombia	Bogotá	34–10	South American Rugby Championship "B"	
24 September	Peru – Venezuela	Bogotá	25–24	South American Rugby Championship "B"	
27 September	Brazil – Peru	Bogotá	42–0	South American Rugby Championship "B"	
27 September	Venezuela – Colombia	Bogotá	47–22	South American Rugby Championship "B"	
28 September	Madagascar – Morocco	Antananarivo	36–62	Africa Cup, semi-final	

=== October ===
Date	Match	Venue	Result	Competition	Source
5 October	Austria – Slovenia	Vienna	17–0	Friendly	
5 October	Mali – Benin	Bamako	56–0	Africa Cup, Division 2	
5 October	Senegal – Nigeria	Bamako	6–8	Africa Cup, Division 2	
5 October	Cameroon – Togo	Bamako	80–3	Africa Cup, Division 2	
5 October	Ghana – Mauritania	Bamako	29–8	Africa Cup, Division 2	
8 October	Senegal – Benin	Bamako	25–6	Africa Cup, Division 2	
8 October	Mali – Nigeria	Bamako	25–18	Africa Cup, Division 2	
8 October	Togo – Mauritania	Bamako	16–7	Africa Cup, Division 2	
8 October	Cameroon – Ghana	Bamako	40–3	Africa Cup, Division 2	
10 October	Australia – Argentina	Stadium Australia, Sydney	24–8	Rugby World Cup, Pool A	
10 October	Nigeria – Benin	Bamako	51–0	Africa Cup, Division 2	
10 October	Mali – Senegal	Bamako	17–6	Africa Cup, Division 2	
10 October	Cameroon – Mauritania	Bamako	81–0	Africa Cup, Division 2	
10 October	Ghana – Togo	Bamako	14–9	Africa Cup, Division 2	
11 October	New Zealand – Italy	Docklands Stadium, Melbourne	70–7	Rugby World Cup, Pool D	
11 October	France – Fiji	Suncorp Stadium, Brisbane	61–18	Rugby World Cup, Pool B	
11 October	Ireland – Romania	Central Coast Stadium, Gosford	45–17	Rugby World Cup, Pool A	
11 October	South Africa – Uruguay	Subiaco Oval, Perth	72–6	Rugby World Cup, Pool C	
11 October	Poland – Sweden	Gdańsk	36–0	European Nations Cup Second Division	
11 October	Slovenia – Croatia	Ljubljana	22–20	European Nations Cup Second Division	
11 October	Switzerland – Denmark	Geneva	12–12	European Nations Cup Second Division	
11 October	Moldova – Hungary	Budapest	35–17	European Nations Cup Third Division	
11 October	Sri Lanka – Hong Kong	Kandy	22–36	Asian Rugby Series	
12 October	Wales – Canada	Docklands Stadium, Melbourne	41–10	Rugby World Cup, Pool D	
12 October	Scotland – Japan	Dairy Farmers Stadium, Townsville	32–11	Rugby World Cup, Pool B	
12 October	England – (Georgia (country)) Georgia	Subiaco Oval, Perth	84–6	Rugby World Cup, Pool C	
12 October	Ukraine – Germany	Kyiv	6–3	European Nations Cup Second Division	
12 October	Kazakhstan – Thailand	Almaty	56–17	Asian Rugby Series	
12 October	Cameroon – Mali	Bamako	49–0	Africa Cup, Division 2	
12 October	Nigeria – Ghana	Bamako	29–3	Africa Cup, Division 2	
12 October	Senegal – Togo	Bamako	8–6	Africa Cup, Division 2	
12 October	Benin – Mauritania	Bamako	8–0	Africa Cup, Division 2	
14 October	Argentina – Namibia	Central Coast Stadium, Gosford	67–14	Rugby World Cup, Pool A	
15 October	Fiji – United States	Suncorp Stadium, Brisbane	19–18	Rugby World Cup, Pool B	
15 October	Italy – Tonga	Canberra Stadium, Canberra	36–12	Rugby World Cup, Pool D	
15 October	Samoa – Uruguay	Subiaco Oval, Perth	60–13	Rugby World Cup, Pool C	
16 October	China – Kazakhstan	Beijing	37–30	Asian Rugby Series	
17 October	New Zealand – Canada	Docklands Stadium, Melbourne	68–6	Rugby World Cup, Pool D	
18 October	Australia – Romania	Suncorp Stadium, Brisbane	90–8	Rugby World Cup, Pool A	
18 October	France – Japan	Dairy Farmers Stadium, Townsville	51–29	Rugby World Cup, Pool B	
18 October	South Africa – England	Subiaco Oval, Perth	6–25	Rugby World Cup, Pool C	
18 October	Bermuda – Cayman Islands	Bermuda National Stadium, Hamilton	0–14	Friendly	
19 October	Wales – Tonga	Canberra Stadium, Canberra	27–20	Rugby World Cup, Pool D	
19 October	Ireland – Namibia	Aussie Stadium, Sydney	64–7	Rugby World Cup, Pool A	
19 October	(Georgia (country)) Georgia – Samoa	Subiaco Oval, Perth	9–46	Rugby World Cup, Pool C	
19 October	Japan – Hong Kong	Fukuoka	90–5	Asian Rugby Series	
20 October	Scotland – United States	Suncorp Stadium, Brisbane	39–15	Rugby World Cup, Pool B	
20 October	South Korea – Kazakhstan	Seoul	45–19	Asian Rugby Series	
21 October	Italy – Canada	Canberra Stadium, Canberra	19–14	Rugby World Cup, Pool D	
22 October	Argentina – Romania	Aussie Stadium, Sydney	50–3	Rugby World Cup, Pool A	
23 October	Fiji – Japan	Dairy Farmers Stadium, Townsville	41–13	Rugby World Cup, Pool B	
24 October	New Zealand – Tonga	Suncorp Stadium, Brisbane	91–7	Rugby World Cup, Pool D	
24 October	South Africa – (Georgia (country)) Georgia	Aussie Stadium, Sydney	46–19	Rugby World Cup, Pool C	
25 October	Australia – Namibia	Adelaide Oval, Adelaide	142–0	Rugby World Cup, Pool A	
25 October	Wales – Italy	Canberra Stadium, Canberra	27–15	Rugby World Cup, Pool D	
25 October	France – Scotland	Stadium Australia, Sydney	51–9	Rugby World Cup, Pool B	
25 October	Poland – Ukraine	Łódź	13–24	European Nations Cup Second Division	
25 October	Croatia – Switzerland	Split	5–11	European Nations Cup Second Division	
25 October	Denmark – Slovenia	Odense	21–3	European Nations Cup Second Division	
25 October	Hungary – Latvia	Székesfehérvár	7–14	European Nations Cup Third Division	
25 October	Bosnia and Herzegovina – Luxembourg	Sarajevo	8–31	European Nations Cup Third Division	
26 October	Argentina – Ireland	Adelaide Oval, Adelaide	15–16	Rugby World Cup, Pool A	
26 October	England – Samoa	Docklands Stadium, Melbourne	35–22	Rugby World Cup, Pool C	
27 October	Japan – United States	Central Coast Stadium, Gosford	26–39	Rugby World Cup, Pool B	
28 October	(Georgia (country)) Georgia – Uruguay	Aussie Stadium, Sydney	12–24	Rugby World Cup, Pool C	
29 October	Canada – Tonga	WIN Stadium, Wollongong	24–7	Rugby World Cup, Pool D	
30 October	Namibia – Romania	York Park, Launceston	7–37	Rugby World Cup, Pool A	
31 October	France – United States	WIN Stadium, Wollongong	41–14	Rugby World Cup, Pool B	
31 October	India – Pakistan	Kandy	52–15	Friendly	

=== November ===
Date	Match	Venue	Result	Competition	Source
1 November	Australia – Ireland	Docklands Stadium, Melbourne	17–16	Rugby World Cup, Pool A	
1 November	Scotland – Fiji	Sydney Football Stadium, Sydney	22–20	Rugby World Cup, Pool B	
1 November	South Africa – Samoa	Suncorp Stadium, Brisbane	60–10	Rugby World Cup, Pool C	
2 November	England – Uruguay	Suncorp Stadium, Brisbane	111–13	Rugby World Cup, Pool C	
2 November	New Zealand – Wales	Stadium Australia, Sydney	53–37	Rugby World Cup, Pool D	
8 November	New Zealand – South Africa	Telstra Dome, Melbourne	29–9	Rugby World Cup, Quarter-final	
8 November	Australia – Scotland	Suncorp Stadium, Brisbane	33–16	Rugby World Cup, Quarter-final	
8 November	Slovenia – Belgium	Ljubljana	3–15	European Nations Cup Second Division	
8 November	Luxembourg – Lithuania	Luxembourg	9–8	European Nations Cup Third Division	
9 November	France – Ireland	Docklands Stadium, Melbourne	43–21	Rugby World Cup, Quarter-final	
9 November	England – Wales	Suncorp Stadium, Brisbane	28–17	Rugby World Cup, Quarter-final	
15 November	Australia – New Zealand	Stadium Australia, Sydney	22–10	Rugby World Cup, Semi-final	
15 November	Bulgaria – Bosnia and Herzegovina	Pernik	23–3	European Nations Cup Third Division	
15 November	Thailand – China	Bangkok	23–34	ARFU Asian Rugby Series	
16 November	England – France	Stadium Australia, Sydney	24–7	Rugby World Cup, Semi-final	
17 November	South Korea – China	Bangkok	63–9	ARFU Asian Rugby Series	
19 November	South Korea – Thailand	Bangkok	68–8	ARFU Asian Rugby Series	
20 November	New Zealand – France	Stadium Australia, Sydney	40–13	Rugby World Cup, third-place play-off	
22 November	Australia – England	Stadium Australia, Sydney	17–20 (a.e.t.)	Rugby World Cup, Final	

=== December ===
Date	Match	Venue	Result	Competition	Source
6 December	Chinese Taipei – Singapore	Taipei	19–6	ARFU Asian Rugby Series	
20 December	Zambia – Cameroon	Chingola	13–17	Africa Cup second division	
