= Serbia national rugby union team =

National rugby union team

Serbia
- Head coach: Maurice Logue
- Captain: Janko Zemun Milinković
First colours

World Rugby ranking
- Current: 68 (as of 6 October 2025)
- Highest: 68 (6 October 2025)
- Lowest: 88 (23 November 2020)

First international
- Serbia 8–3 British Colonies (9 March 1918)

Biggest win
- Serbia 62–0 Montenegro (8 October 2022)

Biggest defeat
- Germany 108–0 Serbia (12 November 2005)

World Cup
- Appearances: none

The Serbia national rugby union team is classified as a tier three nation by World Rugby, and has yet to qualify for the Rugby World Cup. They have played over 100 internationals.

The national side is ranked 68th in the world, as of 1 December 2025.

== History ==
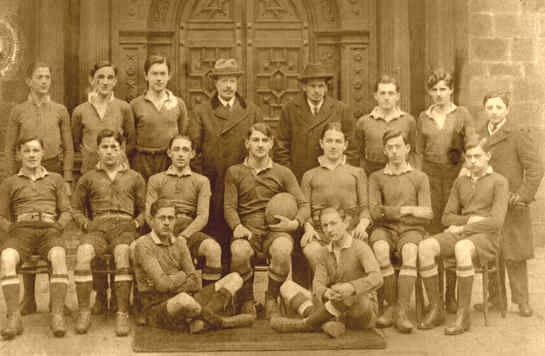
A Serbian Rugby Team, 1918

The first known rugby players from Serbia were Serbian students in George Heriot's School in Edinburgh, Scotland during the First World War. On March 9th, 1918, they played their first unofficial international game, in front of 10,000 spectators, against a British Dominions VII and won by eight points to three. Notable players from this period included Toma Tomić from Leskovac, Dimitrije Dulkanović from Ćuprija, and Danilo Pavlović from Prokuplje. Serbian students also played rugby at the High School of Dundee and Hillhead High School in Glasgow. The best Serbian player in Scotland was Slavoljub Đorđević from Čajetina. He played more than 100 games for Hillhead HS, Glasgow University RFC, and Hillhead RFC in Scotland's top rugby competitions.

Serbia played as a part of Yugoslavia from 1919 until 1992, then as FR Yugoslavia until 2003, and, finally, as Serbia and Montenegro from 2003 to 2006. Yugoslavia made their official international debut in 1968 against a Romanian XV, losing 3 points to 11. They made their full test debut the following month, losing 6 points to 29 against Bulgaria. They won their first official international match in 1969, defeating Bulgaria 22 points to six.

During the 1960s, 1970s, and 1980s, Serbian players played for the Yugoslavia national rugby union team alongside players from the rest of Yugoslavia. After the wars and breakup of Yugoslavia, the Yugoslavia team consisted of players from Serbia only, and they played their first full international against Andorra in Vršac in 1996.

After 1996, playing as FR Yugoslavia and Serbia and Montenegro until 2006, they have played regularly in FIRA-AER and IRB competitions.

== Current squad ==
Starting line-up for the 2025-26 Rugby Europe Conference match against Hungary.

- Coach: Michel Milović

Player	Position	Caps	Club
Dušan Jovanović	Prop		(Serbia) Rugby Club Rad
Istok Totić	Hooker		(Scotland) Greenock Wanderers Rugby Football Club
Vladimir Đukić	Prop		(Serbia) Rugby Club Rad
Relja Pećanac	Lock		(Serbia) Rugby Club Rad
Ivan Boraccino	Lock		(Italy) Civitavecchia Rugby
Kiprijan Đorić	Flanker		(Austria) RC Donau
Uroš Pučar	Flanker		(France) Rugby Club Massy
Predrag Keglić	Number 8		(Serbia) Belgrade Rugby Club Red Star
Janko Zemun Milinković	Scrum-half		(Italy) AS Rugby Bergamo 1950
Igor Gajić	Fly-half		(Serbia) Rugby Club Rad
Dragan Kokanović	Wing		(Serbia) Belgrade Rugby Club Red Star
Milan Vesković	Wing		(Serbia) Rugby Club Rad
Kaspar Strugar	Centre		(United Kingdom) Rugby Football Club Camberley
Antoine Jovović	Wing		(France) Rugby Club Merignac
Igor Dejanović	Fullback		(Serbia) Rugby Club Partizan
Konstantin Đorić	Prop		(Austria) RC Donau
Uroš Jevđenijević	Lock		(Serbia) Rugby Club Rad
Milan Marinković	Flanker		(Scotland) Hillhead Jordanhill RFC
Petar Arnautović	Flanker		(Serbia) Rugby Club Rad
Ivan Vostić	Centre		(Serbia) Rugby Club Dinamo 1954
Stefan Dramićanin	Prop		(Serbia) Rugby Club Dinamo 1954
Petar Pavlović	Prop		(Serbia) Rugby Club Dorćol 1998

== Results ==
=== As the Federal Republic of Yugoslavia (1996–2002) ===
Date	Location	Opposition	Result	Tournament
1996-05-04	Vršac	Andorra	30–12	1995–1997 FIRA Trophy
1996-05-18	Gabrovo	Bulgaria	39–9	1995–1997 FIRA Trophy
1996-10-06	Kyiv	Ukraine	0–60	1999 Rugby World Cup - European qualification
1996-11-02	Vienna	Austria	Default	1999 Rugby World Cup - European qualification
1997-03-01	Pančevo	Switzerland	8–0	1999 Rugby World Cup - European qualification
1997-05-10	Pančevo	Israel	10–7	1999 Rugby World Cup - European qualification
1997-11-08	Nyon	Switzerland	13–29	1997–1998 FIRA Tournament
1998-04-25	Belgrade	Israel	30–6	1997–1998 FIRA Tournament
1998-05-20	Belgrade	Lithuania	44–0	1997–1998 FIRA Tournament
1998-06-02	Riga	Latvia	Default	1997–1998 FIRA Tournament
1998-10-10	Brussels	Belgium	6–12	1998–1999 FIRA Tournament
1999-05-08	Tunis	Tunisia	6–45	1998–1999 FIRA Tournament
2000-04-02	Belgrade	Moldova	17–3	European Nations Cup Fourth Division 2000
2000-04-30	Pernik	Bulgaria	33–6	European Nations Cup Fourth Division 2000
2000-05-13	Herzlia	Israel	17–3	European Nations Cup Fourth Division 2000
2000-10-14	Andorra la Vella	Andorra	9–12	2003 Rugby World Cup – European qualification
2000-11-05	Dimitrovgrad	Bulgaria	46–6	2003 Rugby World Cup – European qualification
2001-03-31	Dimitrovgrad	Hungary	25–10	2003 Rugby World Cup – European qualification
2001-05-12	Zenica	Bosnia and Herzegovina	13–23	2003 Rugby World Cup – European qualification
2001-05-26	Gornji Milanovac	Switzerland	13–10	2003 Rugby World Cup – European qualification
2001-10-20	Chişinău	Moldova	16–36	2001–2002 European Nations Cup Third Division
2002-04-06	Belgrade	Austria	26–8	2001–2002 European Nations Cup Third Division
2002-05-04	Andorra La Vella	Andorra	19–5	2001–2002 European Nations Cup Third Division
2002-05-11	Belgrade	Slovenia	27–21	2001–2002 European Nations Cup Third Division

=== As Serbia and Montenegro (2003–2006) ===
Date	Location	Opposition	Result	Tournament
2003-04-26	Esztergom	Hungary	23–47	2002–2003 European Nations Cup Third Division
2003-05-03	Belgrade	Latvia	18–29	2002–2003 European Nations Cup Third Division
2003-05-24	Chişinău	Moldova	17–17	2002–2003 European Nations Cup Third Division
2004-04-10	Subotica	Hungary	31–3	2003–2004 European Nations Cup Third Division
2004-04-17	Marsa	Malta	18–20	2003–2004 European Nations Cup Third Division
2004-05-08	Pančevo	Moldova	20–43	2003–2004 European Nations Cup Third Division
2004-11-13	Belgrade	Bulgaria	33–10	2007 Rugby World Cup – Europe qualification
2005-03-19	Belgrade	Switzerland	11–11	2007 Rugby World Cup – Europe qualification
2005-04-09	Valletta	Malta	24–13	2007 Rugby World Cup – Europe qualification
2005-05-07	Łódź	Poland	11–18	2007 Rugby World Cup – Europe qualification
2005-10-08	Split	Croatia	9–26	2007 Rugby World Cup – Europe qualification
2005-11-05	Pančevo	Malta	3–16	2007 Rugby World Cup – Europe qualification
2005-11-12	Heidelberg	Germany	0–108	2007 Rugby World Cup – Europe qualification
2006-04-08	Lazarevac	Belgium	15–36	2007 Rugby World Cup – Europe qualification

=== As Serbia (2006–) ===
Date	Location	Opposition	Result	Tournament
2006-10-07	Nyon	Switzerland	9–30	2006–2008 European Nations Cup Third Division
2006-11-04	Belgrade	Denmark	34–23	2006–2008 European Nations Cup Third Division
2007-04-14	Pančevo	Sweden	12–30	2006–2008 European Nations Cup Third Division
2007-10-27	Odense	Denmark	17–17	2006–2008 European Nations Cup Third Division
2007-11-24	Pančevo	Switzerland	5–13	2006–2008 European Nations Cup Third Division
2008-04-26	Lund	Sweden	3–22	2006–2008 European Nations Cup Third Division
2008-05-10	Yerevan	Armenia	0–25	2006–2008 European Nations Cup Third Division
2008-05-25	Belgrade	Armenia	19–8	2006–2008 European Nations Cup Third Division
2008-09-13	Smederevo	Armenia	0–41	2008–2010 European Nations Cup Third Division
2008-12-06	Smederevo	Andorra	32–7	2008–2010 European Nations Cup Third Division
2009-04-04	Nyon	Switzerland	12–6	2008–2010 European Nations Cup Third Division
2009-05-02	Vilnius	Lithuania	9–50	2008–2010 European Nations Cup Third Division
2009-10-24	Belgrade	Switzerland	13–8	2008–2010 European Nations Cup Third Division
2009-11-28	Andorra La Vella	Andorra	7–21	2008–2010 European Nations Cup Third Division
2010-04-10	Abovian	Armenia	19–20	2008–2010 European Nations Cup Third Division
2010-04-24	Pančevo	Lithuania	5–77	2008–2010 European Nations Cup Third Division
2010-10-23	Ljubljana	Slovenia	3–33	2010–2012 European Nations Cup Second Division
2010-11-20	Belgrade	Switzerland	18–15	2010–2012 European Nations Cup Second Division
2011-02-19	Andorra La Vella	Andorra	25–42	2010–2012 European Nations Cup Second Division
2011-05-07	Belgrade	Armenia	20–18	2010–2012 European Nations Cup Second Division
2011-10-29	Belgrade	Slovenia	52–0	2010–2012 European Nations Cup Second Division
2011-11-12	Monthey	Switzerland	19–27	2010–2012 European Nations Cup Second Division
2012-04-14	Belgrade	Andorra	7–9	2010–2012 European Nations Cup Second Division
2012-04-21		Armenia	25–0	2010–2012 European Nations Cup Second Division
2012-10-13	Netanya	Israel	22–48	2012–2014 European Nations Cup Second Division
2012-10-27	Belgrade	Latvia	39–22	2012–2014 European Nations Cup Second Division
2012-11-03	Belgrade	Andorra	26–29	2012–2014 European Nations Cup Second Division
2013-04-13	Odense	Denmark	0–38	2012–2014 European Nations Cup Second Division
2013-10-12	Valmiera	Latvia	14–25	2012–2014 European Nations Cup Second Division
2013-10-19	Belgrade	Israel	6–18	2012–2014 European Nations Cup Second Division
2014-03-30	Andorra La Vella	Andorra	12–23	2012–2014 European Nations Cup Second Division
2014-04-12	Belgrade	Denmark	19–33	2012–2014 European Nations Cup Second Division
2014-10-18	Ljubljana	Slovenia	3–48	2014–16 European Nations Cup Second Division
2014-10-25	Belgrade	Luxembourg	0–36	2014–16 European Nations Cup Second Division
2015-04-18	Belgrade	Austria	22–3	2014–16 European Nations Cup Second Division
2015-04-25	Odense	Denmark	25–22	2014–16 European Nations Cup Second Division
2015-11-07	Belgrade	Slovenia	17–33	2014–16 European Nations Cup Second Division
2015-11-14	Luxembourg	Luxembourg	24–30	2014–16 European Nations Cup Second Division
2016-04-09	Vienna	Austria	26–12	2014–16 European Nations Cup Second Division
2016-04-16	Belgrade	Denmark	23–20	2014–16 European Nations Cup Second Division
2016-10-29	Ljubljana	Slovenia	13–74	2016–17 Rugby Europe International Championships
2016-11-05	Zrenjanin	Turkey	25–0	2016–17 Rugby Europe International Championships
2017-04-09	Zenica	Bosnia and Herzegovina	10–21	2016–17 Rugby Europe International Championships
2017-04-29	Belgrade	Austria	29–12	2016–17 Rugby Europe International Championships
2017-10-21	Vienna	Austria	25–27	2017–18 Rugby Europe International Championships
2017-10-28	Pancevo	Slovenia	21–30	2017–18 Rugby Europe International Championships
2018-04-21	Piestany	Slovakia	50–24	2017–18 Rugby Europe International Championships
2018-04-28	Belgrade	Cyprus	35–17	2017–18 Rugby Europe International Championships
2018-10-13	Belgrade	Bulgaria	29–35	2018–19 Rugby Europe International Championships
2018-11-10	Piestany	Slovakia	37–10	2018–19 Rugby Europe International Championships
2019-05-11	Pancevo	Slovenia	35–27	2018–19 Rugby Europe International Championships
2019-05-18	Andorra La Vella	Andorra	0–33	2018–19 Rugby Europe International Championships
2019-10-12	Sofia	Bulgaria	7–71	2019–20 Rugby Europe International Championships
2019-10-19	Belgrade	Turkey	30–15	2019–20 Rugby Europe International Championships
2021-10-16	Sofia	Bulgaria	11–14	2021–22 Rugby Europe International Championships
2021-10-23	Pancevo	Turkey	37–14	2021–22 Rugby Europe International Championships
2022-04-16	Pancevo	Andorra	24–18	2021–22 Rugby Europe International Championships
2022-05-07	Zenica	Bosnia and Herzegovina	38–19	2021–22 Rugby Europe International Championships
2022-10-08	Belgrade	Montenegro	62–0	2022–23 Rugby Europe International Championships
2022-10-15	Trabzon	Turkey	23–6	2022–23 Rugby Europe International Championships
2023-04-13	Zenica	Bosnia and Herzegovina	40–12	2022–23 Rugby Europe International Championships
2023-10-07	Chişinău	Moldova	11–31	2023–24 Rugby Europe International Championships
2023-04-13	Pancevo	Turkey	22–31	2023–24 Rugby Europe International Championships
2023-04-20	Sofia	Bulgaria	7–30	2023–24 Rugby Europe International Championships
2024-10-05	Belgrade	Moldova	3–31	2024–25 Rugby Europe International Championships
2025-04-12	Istanbul	Turkey	28–12	2024–25 Rugby Europe International Championships
2025-10-05	Belgrade	Bulgaria	44–28	2024–25 Rugby Europe International Championships
2025-04-10	Esztergom	Hungary	59–26	2025–26 Rugby Europe International Championships
2025-25-10	Pancevo	Slovakia	52–12	2025–26 Rugby Europe International Championships

== Overall ==
Below is a table of the representative rugby matches played by a Serbia national XV at test level up until 3 October 2026, updated after match with Croatia.

Nation	Games	Won	Lost	Drawn	Percentage of wins
Andorra	12	4	8	0	33.33%
Armenia	6	3	3	0	50%
Austria	7	4	3	0	57.14%
Belgium	2	0	2	0	0%
Bosnia and Herzegovina	4	2	2	0	50%
Bulgaria	9	5	4	0	55.56%
Croatia	2	0	2	0	0%
Cyprus	1	1	0	0	100%
Denmark	6	3	2	1	50%
Germany	1	0	1	0	0%
Hungary	4	3	1	0	75%
Israel	5	3	2	0	60%
Latvia	3	1	2	0	33.33%
Lithuania	3	1	2	0	33.33%
Luxembourg	2	0	2	0	0%
Malta	3	1	2	0	33.33%
Moldova	6	1	4	1	16.67%
Montenegro	1	1	0	0	100%
Poland	1	0	1	0	0%
Slovakia	4	4	0	0	100%
Slovenia	9	4	5	0	44.44%
Sweden	2	0	2	0	0%
Switzerland	10	5	4	1	50%
Tunisia	1	0	1	0	0%
Turkey	6	5	1	0	83.33%
Ukraine	1	0	1	0	0%
Total	111	49	59	3	44.14%

== Player records ==
=== Most caps ===
#	Name	Years	Caps	Position
1	Vladimir DJukic	2008–2025	52	Prop
2	Marko Kapor	1999–2019	50	Fly-half
3	Nikola Stancevic	1973–1990	45	Flanker
4	Milan Rastovac	1997–2013	45	Centre
5	Igor Dejanovic	2007–2025	44	Fullback
6	Nenad Matejic	2002–2019	42	Fullback
7	Aleksandar DJordjevic	2008–2024	41	Centre
8	Boris Martic	2005–2025	40	Flanker&Prop
9	Dragan Grujic	1988–2006	39	Fullback
10	Miladin Zivanov	2006–2025	38	Centre

Last updated: Hungary vs Serbia, 04 October 2025. Statistics include officially capped matches only.

=== Top point scorers ===
#	Name	Career	Points	Caps	Position
1	Marko Kapor	1999–2019	209	50	Fly-half
2	Marko Gvozdenovic	2015–2025	122	10	Center&No.8
3	Vladimir Jelic	1996–2014	103	14	Fly-half
4	Boris Martic	2005–2025	103	39	Flanker
5	Dragan Grujic	1988–2006	98	39	Full-back
6	Milan Orlovic	2007–2014	75	24	Centre
7	Nenad Matejic	2002–2014	71	42	Full-back
8	Nikola Stankovic	2018–	64	13	Fly Half
9	Milan Rastovac	1997–2013	55	45	Centre
10	Igor Dejanovic	2007–2025	52	44	Fullback

=== Youngest players ===
#	Player	Pos	Age	Opposition	Date
1.	Stefan Jerkovic	Centre	17 years 10 months 28 days	Slovenia	2016-10-29
2.	Srdjan Bozic	Scrum-half	17 years 11 months 21 days	Slovakia	2018-11-10
3.	Ivan Pirkovic	Centre	18 years 1 month 12 days	Sweden	2007-04-14
4.	Aleksandar Jakisic	Flanker	18 years 2 months 3 days	Czech Republic	1991-04-21
5.	Milan Rastovac	Centre	18 years 2 months 4 days	Israel	1997-05-10
6.	Ivan Biocanin	Prop	18 years 2 months 25 days	Switzerland	1997-11-08
7.	Marko Isailovic	Wing	18 years 3 months 3 days	Luxembourg	2014-10-25
7.	Branimir Petrovic	Centre	18 years 3 months 3 days	Andorra	2009-11-28
9.	Janko Zemun Milinkovic	Scrum-half	18 years 3 months 28 days	Bosnia and Herzegovina	2017-04-22
10.	Dalibor Vukanovic	Centre	18 years 4 months 6 days	Bulgaria	2004-11-13

Last updated: Bulgaria vs Serbia, 20 April 2024. Statistics include officially capped matches only.

=== Oldest players ===
#	Player	Pos	Age	Opposition	Date
1.	Srdjan Nikolic	Tighthead Prop	43 years 1 month 2 days	Bulgaria	2019-10-12
2.	Vladimir Jelic	Fly-half	41 years 9 months 12 days	Luxembourg	2014-10-25
3.	Ivan Rodic	Tighthead Prop	41 years 0 months 30 days	Bulgaria	2024-04-20
4.	Milan Medic	Hooker	40 years 9 months 4 days	Switzerland	1997-11-08
5.	Sasa DJukic	Wing	40 years 4 month 23 days	Andorra	2011-02-19
6.	Branislav Acimovic	Prop	39 years 10 months 22 days	Andorra	2008-12-06
7.	Dragan Grujic	Fullback	39 years 9 months 7 days	Belgium	2006-04-08
8.	Dejan Karatrajkovski	Scrum-half	39 years 5 months 6 days	Denmark	2015-04-25
9.	Nikola Stancevic	Flanker	39 years 4 months 25 days	Andorra	1990-05-26
10.	Bojan Lukic	Hooker	39 years 3 months 10 days	Bulgaria	2019-10-12

Last updated: Bulgaria vs Serbia, 20 April 2024. Statistics include officially capped matches only.

== World Cup record ==
- 1987 – No qualifying tournament held
- 1991 – Did not qualify. Yugoslavia was eliminated by Czechoslovakia in European qualifying.
- 1995 – Yugoslavia was banned from European qualifying due to the political situation in the country at that time.
- 1999 – Did not qualify
- 2003 – Did not qualify
- 2007 – Did not qualify
- 2011 – Did not qualify
- 2015 – Did not qualify
- 2019 – Did not qualify
- 2023 – Did not qualify
- 2027 – Did not qualify

== See also ==
- 2007 Rugby World Cup - European qualification
