= 2000 European Nations Cup Fourth Division =

The 2000 European Nations Cup (ENC) Fourth Division (a European rugby union competition for national teams) was contested over one year during which all teams (divided in three pools) met each other once. There was no promotion or relegation due the 2003 Rugby World Cup European qualification.

== Pool 1 ==
=== Table ===
Place	Nation	Games				Points			Table points
Place	Nation	played	won	drawn	lost	for	against	difference	Table points
1	Slovenia	4	4	0	0	93	21	+72	12
2	Andorra	4	3	0	1	70	48	+22	10
3	Monaco	4	1	0	3	40	56	−16	6
4	Hungary	4	1	0	3	68	99	−31	6
5	Austria	4	1	0	3	51	98	−47	6

=== Results ===
16 October 1999

Hungary	3–27	Slovenia

Budapest

30 October 1999

Slovenia	16–3	Andorra

Andorra la Vella

6 November 1999

Monaco	22–7	Hungary

Menton

5 February 2000

Monaco	10–14	Andorra

26 February 2000

Andorra	32–10	Hungary

Andorra la Vella

25 March 2000

Austria	9–5	Monaco

Vienna

1 April 2000

Austria	12–24	Slovenia

Vienna

15 April 2000

Slovenia	26–3	Monaco

Ljubliana

29 April 2000

Hungary	48–18	Austria

Budapest

13 May 2000

Andorra	21–12	Austria

Andorra la Vella

== Pool 2 ==
=== Table ===
Place	Nation	Games				Points			Table points
Place	Nation	played	won	drawn	lost	for	against	difference	Table points
1	Yugoslavia	3	3	0	0	67	12	+55	9
2	Moldova	3	2	0	1	62	43	+19	7
3	Israel	3	1	0	2	54	53	+1	5
4	Bulgaria	3	0	0	3	34	109	−75	3

=== Results ===
2 April 2000

Yugoslavia	17–3	Moldova

Belgrade

30 April 2000

Moldova	20–14	Israel

Chișinău

30 April 2000

Bulgaria	6–33	Yugoslavia

Sofia

7 May 2000

Moldova	39–12	Bulgaria

Chișinău

14 May 2000

Israel	3–17	Yugoslavia

Herzliya

21 May 2000

Israel	37–16	Bulgaria

Herzliya

== Pool 3 ==
=== Table ===
Place	Nation	Games				Points			Table points
Place	Nation	played	won	drawn	lost	for	against	difference	Table points
1	Sweden	3	3	0	0	131	8	+123	9
2	Luxembourg	3	2	0	1	126	52	74	7
3	Lithuania	2	1	0	1	55	54	1	4
4	Norway	3	0	0	3	20	218	−198	3

=== Results ===
23 October 1999

Sweden	34–8	Luxembourg

Lund

15 April 2000

Luxembourg	78–12	Norway

Cessange

29 April 2000

Sweden	91–0	Norway

Vänersborg

13 May 2000

Luxembourg	40–6	Lithuania

Luxembourg

27 May 2000

Norway	8–49	Lithuania

Oslo

10 June 2000

Lithuania	0–3	Sweden

FORFAIT

== See also ==
- European Nations Cup First Division 2000
- European Nations Cup Second Division 2000
- European Nations Cup Third Division 2000
