= 2002–2004 European Nations Cup Second Division =

European rugby championship

The 2002–2004 European Nations Cup was the fourth edition of the newly reformed European Championship for tier 2 & 3 Rugby Union Nations. This was the second two-year cycled championship, the first to be planned from the start.

For the second division. the team was divided in two Pool . The winner of Pool "A" gain the promotion to 2004–2006 European Nations Cup First Division. There were no relegation, due the 2007 Rugby World Cup – Europe qualification

== Pool A ==
The highest level was the Pool "A", with five teams:

- Netherlands relegated from first division at the end of previous edition.
- Poland runner-up of the second round of qualification RWC 2003 valid also ad Second Division tournament.
- Ukraine second in pool A of the same tournament.
- Germany second in pool B of the same tournament.
- Sweden third in his pool of the same tournament and with better ranking respect the third of other group.

=== Table ===
Place	Nation	Games				Points			Table points
Place	Nation	played	won	drawn	lost	for	against	difference	Table points
1	Ukraine	8	7	1	0	200	74	+126	23
2	Germany	8	5	1	2	192	90	+102	19
3	Netherlands	8	4	1	3	132	131	+1	17
4	Poland	8	2	1	5	130	164	−34	13
5	Sweden	8	0	0	8	52	247	−195	8

- Ukraine promoted to 2004–2006 European Nations Cup First Division

== Results ==
=== First Season (2002–3) ===
5 October 2002

Sweden	7–14	Poland

Lund

19 October 2002

Ukraine	20–11	Poland

Kyiv

24 November 2002

Germany	26–26	Ukraine

Heidelberg

9 March 2003

Germany	15–3	Netherlands

Hanover

29 March 2003

Poland	15–37	Germany

Gdynia

27 April 2003

Netherlands	18–24	Ukraine

Gdynia

27 April 2003

Sweden	16–24	Germany

Trelleborg

3 May 2003

Netherlands	39–26	Sweden

Amsterdam

10 May 2003

Poland	13–13	Netherlands

Gdynia

24 May 2003

Ukraine	37–0	Sweden

Kyiv

=== Second Season (2003–2004) ===
11 October 2003

Poland	36–0	Sweden

Gdynia

12 October 2003

Ukraine	6–3	Germany

Kyiv

25 October 2003

Poland	13–24	Ukraine

Łódź

10 April 2004

Netherlands	14–13	Germany

Amsterdam

25 April 2004

Germany	40–0	Sweden

Hannover

25 April 2004

Netherlands	29–18	Poland

Amsterdam

1 May 2004

Sweden	3–41	Ukraine

Vänersborg

8 May 2004

Sweden	0–16	Netherlands

Stockholm

16 May 2004

Ukraine	22–0	Netherlands

Kyiv

16 May 2004

Germany	34–10	Poland

Hannover

== Pool B ==
The lowest Level was the Pool "B", with five teams:

- Croatia third in their pool of the second round of qualification RWC 2003
- Switzerland fourth in pool A of the same tournament.
- Denmark fourth in pool B of the same tournament.
- Belgium fifth in his pool of the same tournament and with better ranking respect the fifth of other group.
- Slovenia winner of the 2001–02 Third division

=== Table ===
Place	Nation	Games				Points			Table points
Place	Nation	played	won	drawn	lost	for	against	difference	Table points
1	Switzerland	8	5	3	0	145	95	+50	21
2	Denmark	8	3	4	1	102	88	+14	18
3	Croatia	8	3	1	4	114	95	+19	15
4	Slovenia	8	2	1	5	112	150	−38	13
5	Belgium	8	2	1	5	99	144	−45	13

=== First Season (2002–03) ===
19 October 2002

Croatia	13–0	Slovenia

Zagreb

26 October 2002

Denmark	13–13	Switzerland

Copenhagen

2 November 2002

Slovenia	10–13	Denmark

Ljubljana

2 November 2002

Croatia	33–12	Belgium

Zagreb

9 November 2002

Switzerland	24–15	Croatia

Geneva

8 March 2003

Switzerland	9–6	Belgium

Basel

5 April 2003

Belgium	24–33	Slovenia

Liege

26 April 2003

Belgium	6–6	Denmark

Brussels

3 May 2003

Denmark	8–8	Croatia

Copenhagen

10 May 2003

Slovenia	23–23	Switzerland

Ljubljana

=== Second Season (2003–04) ===
11 October 2003

Slovenia	22–20	Croatia

Ljubljana

11 October 2003

Switzerland	12–12	Denmark

Geneva

25 October 2003

Denmark	21–3	Slovenia

Odense

25 October 2003

Croatia	5–11	Switzerland

Split

8 November 2003

Slovenia	3–15	Belgium

Ljubljana

27 March 2004

Belgium	3–32	Switzerland

Brussels

10 April 2004

Denmark	25–19	Belgium

Odense

17 April 2004

Croatia	17–4	Denmark

Zagreb

17 April 2004

Switzerland	21–18	Slovenia

Geneva

24 April 2004

Belgium	14–3	Croatia

Bruges

== See also ==
- 2003–2004 European Nations Cup First Division
- 2002–2003 European Nations Cup Third Division
- 2003-2004 European Nations Cup Third Division

== Sources ==
- www.irb.com
