= 2003–04 European Nations Cup Third Division =

The 2002–2004 European Nations Cup was the fourth edition of the newly reformed European Championship for tier 2 & 3 Rugby Union Nations. This was the second two-year cycled championship, the first to be planned from the start.

The Third division had a controversy development during the 2002–03 season

The European federation decided to reset tournament and change from a "two-years" formula to a double "two-years formula".

There were no relegation, due the 2007 Rugby World Cup – Europe qualification

== Pool A ==
The highest level was the Pool "A", with five teams:

- Latvia
- Malta promoted from "Pool B"
- Moldova
- Serbia and Montenegro
- Hungary

=== Table ===
Place	Nation	Games				Points			Table points
Place	Nation	played	won	drawn	lost	for	against	difference	Table points
1	Moldova	4	4	0	0	129	57	+72	12
2	Malta	4	3	0	1	73	75	−2	10
3	Latvia	4	2	0	2	34	43	−9	8
4	Serbia and Montenegro	4	1	0	3	69	66	0	5
5	Hungary	4	0	0	4	54	118	−64	4

=== Results ===
11 October 2003

Hungary	17–38	Moldova

Esztergom

25 October 2003

Hungary	7–14	Latvia

Székesfehérvár

10 April 2004

Serbia and Montenegro	31–3	Hungary

Subotica

17 April 2004

Moldova	26–12	Latvia

Chișinău

17 April 2004

Malta	20–18	Serbia and Montenegro

Marsa

25 April 2004

Latvia	8–10	Malta

Riga

8 May 2004

Serbia and Montenegro	20–43	Moldova

Beograd

22 May 2004

Latvia	3–0	Serbia and Montenegro

withdraw

22 May 2004

Malta	35–27	Hungary

Marsa

29 May 2004

Moldova	22–8	Malta

Chișinău

== Pool B ==
The middle level was the Pool "B", with five teams:

- Austria
- Bosnia and Herzegovina
- Bulgaria promoted from pool "C"
- Lithuania
- Luxembourg

=== Table ===
Place	Nation	Games				Points			Table points
Place	Nation	played	won	drawn	lost	for	against	difference	Table points
1	Luxembourg	4	4	0	0	98	39	+59	12
2	Austria	4	3	0	1	92	61	+31	10
3	Lithuania	4	2	0	2	89	32	+57	8
4	Bulgaria	4	1	0	3	51	136	−85	6
5	Bosnia and Herzegovina	3	0	0	3	28	87	−59	3

=== Results ===
25 October 2003

Bosnia and Herzegovina	8–31	Luxembourg

Sarajevo

8 November 2003

Luxembourg	9–8	Lithuania

Cessange

15 November 2003

Bulgaria	33–3	Bosnia and Herzegovina

Pernik

24 April 2004

Luxembourg	39–5	Bulgaria

Cessange

8 May 2004

Austria	18–19	Luxembourg

Vienna

15 May 2004

Lithuania	66–0	Bulgaria

Šiauliai

22 May 2004

Lithuania	3 – 0 Bosnia Withdraw	Bosnia and Herzegovina

22 May 2004

Bulgaria	13–28	Austria

Kostinbrod

5 June 2004

Austria	23–12	Lithuania

Vienna

12 June 2004

Bosnia and Herzegovina	17–23	Austria

== Pool C ==
At the lowest level of competition, participated four team:

- Armenia
- Finland
- Israel
- Norway

=== Semifinals ===
2 June 2004

Israel	24–15	Finland

Beauvais

2 June 2004

Armenia	36–6	Norway

Beauvais

=== Third place final ===
5 June 2004

Norway	54–7	Finland

Beauvais

=== Final ===
5 June 2004

Armenia	48–0	Israel

Beauvais

== See also ==
- 2003–2004 European Nations Cup First Division
- 2002–2004 European Nations Cup Second Division
- 2002–2003 European Nations Cup Third Division

== Sources ==
- www.irb.com
