= 2002–03 European Nations Cup Third Division =

International rugby union competition

The 2002–2004 European Nations Cup was the fourth edition of the newly reformed European Championship for tier 2 & 3 Rugby Union Nations. This was the second two-year cycled championship, the first to be planned from the start.

The Third division had a controversy development. The team were divided into three groups according to the ranking of previous edition to play, but there were several problems:

- In pool "A" Andorra withdrew and only four teams remained.
- In pool "C" Monaco were banned after the match with Finland, because of the presence of a French player that was not eligible to play for Monaco.
- Again in pool "C" the match between Bulgaria and Norway was annulled because the designed referee wasn't able to arrive in Sofia and was substituted by another referee, called by the Bulgarian federation.

So the European federation decided to change from a two-years formula to a one-year formula again, considering the two matches played in Pool "C" as friendlies and turning the Pool into a short knock-out tournament held in Ibiza, Spain. Furthermore, the winners of Pools B and C were promoted, respectively, to Pools A and B for the 2003–04 edition. No promotions from Pool A to Second division were awarded, nor relegations to lower Pools.

== Pool A ==
The highest level was the Pool "A", with five teams:

- Latvia relegated from second division
- Moldova
- Serbia and Montenegro
- Hungary promoted from Group B
- Andorra (retired from competition)

=== Table ===
Place	Nation	Games				Points			Table points
Place	Nation	played	won	drawn	lost	for	against	difference	Table points
1	Latvia	3	3	0	0	98	23	+75	9
2	Moldova	3	1	1	1	64	71	−7	6
3	Hungary	3	1	0	2	63	96	−33	5
4	Serbia and Montenegro	3	0	1	2	58	93	−35	4

=== Results ===
5 October 2002

Latvia	26–5	Hungary

Riga

26 April 2003

Hungary	47–23	Serbia and Montenegro

Esztergom

26 April 2003

Latvia	43–0	Moldova

Riga

3 May 2003

Serbia and Montenegro	18–29	Latvia

Beograd

10 May 2003

Moldova	47–11	Hungary

Chişinău

24 May 2003

Moldova	17–17	Serbia and Montenegro

Chişinău

== Pool B ==
The middle level was the Pool "B", with five teams:

- Austria relegated from pool "A"
- Bosnia and Herzegovina
- Lithuania
- Luxembourg
- Malta promoted from pool "C"

=== Table ===
Place	Nation	Games				Points			Table points
Place	Nation	played	won	drawn	lost	for	against	difference	Table points
1	Malta	4	4	0	0	101	54	+47	12
2	Lithuania	4	3	0	1	147	53	+94	10
3	Luxembourg	4	2	0	2	58	113	−55	8
4	Austria	4	1	0	3	65	88	−23	6
5	Bosnia and Herzegovina	4	0	0	4	40	103	−63	4

- Malta promoted to Pool A

=== Results ===
27 October 2002

Luxembourg	21–5	Bosnia and Herzegovina

Cessange

23 November 2002

Malta	22–18	Lithuania

Marsa

26 November 2002

Lithuania	32–10	Austria

Vilnius

30 November 2002

Austria	16–25	Malta

Wien

29 March 2003

Malta	34–6	Luxembourg

Marsa

5 April 2003

Bosnia and Herzegovina	14–20	Malta

Sarajevo

10 May 2003

Luxembourg	25–14	Austria

Cessange

24 May 2003

Lithuania	60–6	Luxembourg

Klaipėda

7 June 2003

Bosnia and Herzegovina	15–37	Lithuania

Zenica

14 June 2003

Austria	25–6	Bosnia and Herzegovina

Wien

== Pool C ==
- "No official" match :

19 October 2002

Monaco	90–0	Finland

Monte Carlo

26 October 2002

Bulgaria	21–12	Norway

Sofia

=== Semifinals ===
5 June 2003

Israel	30–13	Norway

Ibiza

5 June 2003

Bulgaria	42–3	Finland

Ibiza

=== Third place final ===
7 June 2003

Finland	20–55	Norway

Ibiza

=== First place final ===
7 June 2003

Israel	23–25	Bulgaria

Ibiza

- Bulgaria promoted to Pool B

== See also ==
- 2003–2004 European Nations Cup First Division
- 2002–2004 European Nations Cup Second Division
- 2003–2004 European Nations Cup Third Division

== Sources ==
- www.irb.com
