= 2001–02 European Nations Cup Third Division =

The 2001 European Nations Cup (ENC) Third Division (a European rugby union competition for national teams) was contested over a one-year period by 15 teams divided in three pools.

The teams were divided in 3 pool according to the results of the first round of 2003 Rugby World Cup – European qualification, played the previous season

== Pool 1 (Title) ==
Played by :

- Austria (3rd) im RWC qualification pool A
- Yugoslavia (2nd) in RWC qualification pool B
- Andorra (3rd) in RWC qualification pool B
- Slovenia (2nd) in RWC qualification pool C
- Moldova (3rd) in RWC qualification pool C

=== table ===
Place	Nation	Games				Points			Table points
Place	Nation	played	won	drawn	lost	for	against	difference	Table points
1	Slovenia	4	3	0	1	113	59	+54	10
2	Yugoslavia	4	3	0	1	88	70	+18	10
3	Moldova	3	2	0	1	63	72	−9	7
4	Andorra	3	1	0	2	77	48	+29	5
5	Austria	4	0	0	4	41	133	−92	4

- Slovenia Promoted to 2002–03 2nd div.- Pool B
- Austria Relegated to 2002–03 3rd div.- Pool B

=== Result ===
29 September 2001

Austria	16–24	Slovenia

Vienna

13 October 2001

Andorra	56–3	Austria

Andorra la Vella

20 October 2001

Moldova	36–16	Yugoslavia

Chișinău

11 November 2001

Slovenia	26–16	Andorra

Ljubliana

6 April 2002

Yugoslavia	26–8	Austria

Belgrade

20 April 2002

Austria	14–27	Moldova

Linz

25 May 2002

Slovenia	42–0	Moldova

Ljubliana

4 May 2002

Andorra	5–19	Yugoslavia

Andorra la Vella

11 May 2002

Yugoslavia	27–21	Slovenia

Belgrade

- Moldova-Andorra not played.

== Pool 2 (Plate) ==
Played by:

- Hungary (4th) im RWC qualification pool A
- Bosnia and Herzegovina (5th) in RWC qualification pool A
- Israel (4th) in RWC qualification pool B
- Luxembourg (5th) in RWC qualification pool B
- Lithuania (4th) in RWC qualification pool C

=== table ===
Place	Nation	Games				Points			Table points
Place	Nation	played	won	drawn	lost	for	against	difference	Table points
1	Hungary	4	4	0	0	121	57	+64	12
2	Lithuania	4	3	0	1	87	66	+21	10
3	Bosnia and Herzegovina	4	2	0	2	41	72	−31	8
4	Luxembourg	4	1	0	3	67	71	−4	6
5	'Israel	4	0	0	4	72	122	−50	4

- Hungary Promoted to 2002–03 3rd div.- Pool A
- Israel Telegated to 2002–03 3rd div.- Pool C

=== Results ===
6 October 2001

Luxembourg	17–19	Hungary

Cessange

20 October 2001

Hungary	26–16	Lithuania

Százhalombatta

27 October 2001

Bosnia and Herzegovina	13–12	Luxembourg

Sarajevo

4 May 2002

Luxembourg	7–26	Lithuania

4 May 2002

Bosnia and Herzegovina	19–11	Israel

Zenica

18 May 2002

Lithuania	33–24	Israel

Klaipėda

25 May 2002

Lithuania	12–9	Bosnia and Herzegovina

Jonava

25 May 2002

Hungary	39–24	Israel

Esztergom

1 June 2002

Hungary	37–0	Bosnia and Herzegovina

Esztergom

1 June 2002

Luxembourg	31–13	Israel

Cessange

== Pool 3 (Bowl) ==
Played by:

- Bulgaria (6th) im RWC qualification pool A
- Norway (6th) in RWC qualification pool A
- Monaco (5th) in RWC qualification pool C
- Malta (6th) in RWC qualification pool C

=== table ===
Place	Nation	Games				Points			Table points
Place	Nation	played	won	drawn	lost	for	against	difference	Table points
1	Malta	3	2	1	0	45	24	+21	8
2	Monaco	3	2	0	1	113	16	+97	7
3	Bulgaria	3	1	0	2	30	83	−53	5
4	Norway	3	0	1	2	16	81	−65	4

- Malta Promoted to 2002–03 3rd div.- Pool B

=== results ===
24 November 2001

Malta	8–0	Monaco

Marsa

19 January 2002

Monaco	60–3	Norway

Saint-Laurent-du-Var

9 March 2002

Malta	27–14	Bulgaria

Marsa

6 April 2002

Monaco	53–5	Bulgaria

Monte Carlo

4 May 2002

Bulgaria	11–3	Norway

Sofia

25 May 2002

Norway	10–10	Malta

Ekeberg

== Bibliography ==
- "Rugby Europe Championship; European Nations Cup 2001/02 - Division 3A". The Rugby Archive. 21 December 2014. Archived from the original on 28 February 2022.
- "Rugby Europe Championship; European Nations Cup 2001/02 - Division 3B". The Rugby Archive. 21 December 2014. Archived from the original on 28 February 2022.
- "Rugby Europe Championship; European Nations Cup 2001/02 - Division 3C". The Rugby Archive. 21 December 2014. Archived from the original on 28 February 2022.

== See also ==
- 2001-2002 European Nations Cup First Division
- 2003 Rugby World Cup – European qualification
