= FC CeBra 01 =

Defunct association football club in Luxembourg

- Full name: Football Club Cessange Bracarenses Grund 2001
- Founded: 2001
- Dissolved: 2023
- Ground: Complexe Sportif Boy Konen, Cessange
- Capacity: 1,000

Football Club Cessange Bracarenses Grund 2001 was a football club, based in Cessange, in southern Luxembourg founded in 2001 after a merger between Progrès Cessange and Bracarenses Grund. It has since been merged into FC Luxembourg City in 2023.
