= 2003 South American Rugby Championship "B" =

4° Campeonato Sudamericano de Rugby B
Tournament details
- Host: Colombia
- Date: 21–27 September 2003
- Countries: Brazil; Colombia; Peru; Venezuela

Final positions
- Champions: Venezuela
- Runner-up: Brazil

Tournament statistics
- Matches played: 6

The 2003 South American Rugby Championship "B" was the fourth edition of the competition of the second level national rugby union teams in South America.

The tournament was played in Bogotá, with four teams participating.

Venezuela won the tournament for the first time, winning the direct match with Peru. Every team won at least one match. Brazil participated after a loss against Paraguay, the preliminary round for participating the 2003 "A" championship.

== Standings ==
Three points for a victory, two for a draw, and one for a loss

Team	Played	Won	Drawn	Lost	For	Against	Difference	Pts
Venezuela	3	2	0	1	102	73	+ 29	7
Brazil	3	2	0	1	103	41	+ 62	7
Colombia	3	1	0	2	54	99	45	5
Peru	3	1	0	2	42	88	46	5

== Results ==
- First round

21 September 2003

Colombia	22 - 17	Peru

Bogotá

21 September 2003

Brazil	16 - 31	Venezuela

Bogotá

- Second round

24 September 2003

Colombia	10 - 35	Brazil

Bogotá

24 September 2003

Peru	25 - 24	Venezuela

Bogotá

- Third round

27 September 2003

Colombia	22 - 47	Venezuela

Bogotá

27 September 2003

Brazil	42 - 0	Peru

Bogotá
