= 2003 Rugby World Cup – European qualification =

Tournament details
- Dates: 23 September 2000 – 24 November 2002
- No. of nations: 32

There were a number of positions open to European nations to qualify for the 2003 Rugby World Cup in Australia. Ireland, Romania, Georgia and Italy, joining a number of other nations that automatically qualified.

== Round 1 (2000–2001) ==
The 18 teams that entered qualification at this stage were divided into three pools of six teams each. The winners of each pool and the best runner-up advanced to the second round of qualifying.

=== Pool A ===
Pos	Team	Pld	W	D	L	+/−	Pts
1	Sweden	5	5	0	0	+208	15
2	Latvia	5	4	0	1	+79	13
3	Austria	5	3	0	2	+78	11
4	Israel	5	2	0	3	+51	9
5	Luxembourg	5	1	0	4	−222	7
6	Norway	5	0	0	5	−194	5

Date	Home team	Score	Away team	Venue
23 September 2000	Norway	9–41	Luxembourg	Stavanger, Norway
21 October 2000	Austria	10–42	Sweden	Vienna, Austria
28 October 2000	Latvia	24–19	Luxembourg	Riga, Latvia
28 October 2000	Sweden	44–3	Norway	Korsangens, Sweden
11 November 2000	Latvia	38–12	Austria	Riga, Latvia
3 March 2001	Luxembourg	3–62	Israel	Luxembourg
17 March 2001	Israel	3–21	Latvia	Israel
5 May 2001	Israel	43–3	Norway	Israel
5 May 2001	Luxembourg	3–116	Sweden	Cessange, Luxembourg
12 May 2001	Austria	77–0	Luxembourg	Vienna, Austria
19 May 2001	Latvia	37–0	Norway	Riga, Latvia
19 May 2001	Sweden	35–20	Israel	Växjö, Sweden
2 June 2001	Austria	21–6	Israel	Vienna, Austria
9 June 2001	Norway	7–51	Austria	Borrebanen, Norway
9 June 2001	Sweden	17–10	Latvia	Korsangens, Sweden

=== Pool B ===
Pos	Team	Pld	W	D	L	+/−	Pts
1	Switzerland	5	4	0	1	+166	13
2	Yugoslavia	5	3	0	2	+45	11
3	Andorra	5	3	0	2	+43	11
4	Hungary	5	2	0	3	−9	9
5	Bosnia and Herzegovina	5	2	0	3	−58	9
6	Bulgaria	5	1	0	4	−187	7

Date	Home team	Score	Away team	Venue
30 September 2000	Bosnia and Herzegovina	13–12	Hungary	Zenica, Bosnia and Herzegovina
7 October 2000	Switzerland	43–6	Bosnia and Herzegovina	Geneva, Switzerland
14 October 2000	Bulgaria	9–90	Switzerland	Pernik, Bulgaria
14 October 2000	Andorra	12–9	Yugoslavia	Andorra la Vella, Andorra
28 October 2000	Hungary	27–21	Andorra	Százhalombatta, Hungary
5 November 2000	Yugoslavia	46–6	Bulgaria	Dimitrovgrad, Yugoslavia
31 March 2001	Yugoslavia	25–10	Hungary	Dimitrovgrad, Yugoslavia
5 May 2001	Switzerland	38–25	Andorra	Lausanne, Switzerland
5 May 2001	Bulgaria	30–8	Bosnia and Herzegovina	
12 May 2001	Andorra	59–10	Bulgaria	Andorra la Vella, Andorra
12 May 2001	Switzerland	61–23	Hungary	Basel, Switzerland
12 May 2001	Bosnia and Herzegovina	23–13	Yugoslavia	
25 May 2001	Yugoslavia	13–10	Switzerland	Gornji, Yugoslavia
25 May 2001	Andorra	23–13	Bosnia and Herzegovina	Andorra la Vella, Andorra
25 May 2001	Hungary	46–7	Bulgaria	

=== Pool C ===
Pos	Team	Pld	W	D	L	+/−	Pts
1	Belgium	5	5	0	0	+71	15
2	Slovenia	5	3	1	1	+46	12
3	Moldova	5	3	0	2	+25	11
4	Lithuania	5	2	1	2	+38	10
5	Monaco	5	1	0	4	−30	7
6	Malta	5	0	0	5	−150	5

Date	Home team	Score	Away team	Venue
28 October 2000	Monaco	15–17	Moldova	Menton, France
28 October 2000	Belgium	24–10	Slovenia	King Baudouin Stadium, Brussels, Belgium
18 November 2000	Slovenia	19–19	Lithuania	Ljubljana, Slovenia
18 November 2000	Moldova	58–8	Malta	Bender, Moldova
25 November 2000	Malta	0–26	Belgium	Three Cities, Malta
2 December 2000	Monaco	8–13	Slovenia	Menton, France
20 January 2001	Malta	3–9	Monaco	Three Cities, Malta
3 March 2001	Monaco	12–18	Belgium	Saint-Laurent-du-Var, France
7 April 2001	Belgium	26–10	Moldova	Brussels, Belgium
21 April 2001	Malta	11–39	Lithuania	Three Cities, Malta
28 April 2001	Slovenia	30–15	Moldova	Ljubljana, Slovenia
5 May 2001	Belgium	29–20	Lithuania	Laakdal, Belgium
12 May 2001	Slovenia	45–5	Malta	Ljubljana, Slovenia
12 May 2001	Lithuania	33–10	Monaco	Vilnius, Lithuania
2 June 2001	Moldova	20–16	Lithuania	Chișinău, Moldova

== Round 2 (2001–2002) ==
The four teams that qualified from Round 1 were joined by the six teams from the European Nations Cup Second Division. They were divided into two pools of five teams each. Each pool was played as a single round-robin tournament, and the winner of each pool advanced to Round 3.

=== Pool A ===
Pos	Team	Pld	W	D	L	+/−	Pts
1	Poland	4	4	0	0	+69	12
2	Germany	4	2	0	2	+24	8
3	Sweden	4	2	0	2	+23	8
4	Denmark	4	2	0	2	+19	8
5	Latvia	4	0	0	4	−135	4

Date	Home team	Score	Away team	Venue
22 September 2001	Latvia	18–60	Poland	Riga, Latvia
29 September 2001	Poland	18–6	Sweden	Gdańsk, Poland
7 October 2001	Sweden	37–12	Latvia	Trelleborg, Sweden
20 October 2001	Sweden	32–10	Germany	Malmö, Sweden
27 October 2001	Denmark	33–21	Sweden	Frederiksberg, Denmark
3 November 2001	Denmark	19–26	Poland	Copenhagen, Denmark
10 November 2001	Germany	34–24	Denmark	Heidelberg, Germany
24 November 2001	Germany	44–0	Latvia	Hanover, Germany
6 April 2002	Poland	20–12	Germany	Gdynia, Poland
6 April 2002	Latvia	8–32	Denmark	Riga, Latvia

=== Pool B ===
Pos	Team	Pld	W	D	L	+/−	Pts
1	Czech Republic	4	4	0	0	+95	12
2	Ukraine	4	3	0	1	+46	10
3	Croatia	4	2	0	2	−14	8
4	Switzerland	4	1	0	3	−40	6
5	Belgium	4	0	0	4	−87	4

Date	Home team	Score	Away team	Venue
22 September 2001	Czech Republic	46–3	Belgium	Prague, Czech Republic
6 October 2001	Switzerland	6–32	Czech Republic	Lausanne, Switzerland
13 October 2001	Croatia	5–13	Czech Republic	Makarska, Croatia
13 October 2001	Ukraine	21–10	Belgium	Kyiv, Ukraine
20 October 2001	Ukraine	41–7	Croatia	Kyiv, Ukraine
27 October 2001	Belgium	15–22	Switzerland	Brussels, Belgium
3 November 2001	Czech Republic	26–8	Ukraine	Prague, Czech Republic
10 November 2001	Croatia	18–16	Switzerland	Makarska, Croatia
24 November 2001	Belgium	0–26	Croatia	Brussels, Belgium
24 November 2001	Switzerland	11–30	Ukraine	Hermance, Switzerland

== Round 3 (May–June 2002) ==
The two teams that advanced from Round 2 were joined by the four lowest-ranked teams from the 2000–01 European Nations Cup First Division. The six teams were divided into two pools of three teams each, again played as a single round-robin, with the winners of each pool advancing to Round 4.

=== Pool A ===
Pos	Team	Pld	W	D	L	+/−	Pts
1	Spain	2	1	0	1	+1	4
2	Portugal	2	1	0	1	0	4
3	Poland	2	1	0	1	−1	4

Date	Home team	Score	Away team	Venue
4 May 2002	Poland	27–15	Spain	Warsaw, Poland
18 May 2002	Portugal	39–26	Poland	Jamor, Portugal
2 June 2002	Spain	34–21	Portugal	Madrid, Spain

=== Pool B ===
Pos	Team	Pld	W	D	L	+/−	Pts
1	Russia	2	2	0	0	+81	6
2	Czech Republic	2	1	0	1	+23	4
3	Netherlands	2	0	0	2	−104	2

Date	Home team	Score	Away team	Venue
5 May 2002	Czech Republic	18–37	Russia	Prague, Czech Republic
21 May 2002	Netherlands	12–54	Czech Republic	Amsterdam, Netherlands
1 June 2002	Russia	65–3	Netherlands	Monino, Russia

== Round 4 (September–October 2002) ==
In Round 4, the two teams that advanced from Round 3 were joined by the two remaining teams from the 2000–01 European Nations Cup First Division, as well as Ireland and Italy. The six teams were divided into two pools of three teams each, which were again played as a single round-robin. The top two teams from each pool qualified directly for the Rugby World Cup, while the bottom team from each pool advanced to Round 5.

=== Pool A ===
Italy qualified for the Rugby World Cup as Europe 2 and were placed in Pool D, while Romania qualified as Europe 3 and were placed in Pool A.

Pos	Team	Pld	W	D	L	+/−	Pts
1	Italy	2	2	0	0	+55	6
2	Romania	2	1	0	1	+53	4
3	Spain	2	0	0	2	−108	2

Date	Home team	Score	Away team	Venue
22 September 2002	Spain	3–50	Italy	Valladolid, Spain
28 September 2002	Italy	25–17	Romania	Parma, Italy
5 October 2002	Romania	67–6	Spain	Iași, Romania

=== Pool B ===
Ireland qualified for the Rugby World Cup as Europe 1 and were placed in Pool A, while Georgia qualified as Europe 4 and were placed in Pool C.

Pos	Team	Pld	W	D	L	+/−	Pts
1	Ireland	2	2	0	0	+81	6
2	Georgia	2	1	0	1	−45	4
3	Russia	2	0	0	2	−36	2

Date	Home team	Score	Away team	Venue
21 September 2002	Russia	3–35	Ireland	Krasnoyarsk, Russia
28 September 2002	Ireland	63–14	Georgia	Dublin, Ireland
13 October 2002	Georgia	17–13	Russia	Tbilisi, Georgia

== Round 5 (October–November 2002) ==
The two teams that advanced from Round 4 played a two-legged tie. The winners advanced to the repechage.

Date	Home team	Score	Away team	Venue
27 October 2002	Spain	3–36	Russia	Madrid, Spain
24 November 2002	Russia	22–38	Spain	Krasnodar, Russia

Russia won 58–41 on aggregate. However, after it was determined they used ineligible South African players, they were ejected from the competition and Spain advanced to Repechage.

== Bibliography ==
- "Rugby Europe Championship; European Nations Cup – Third Division / 2003 Rugby World Cup – European qualification". The Rugby Archive. 21 December 2014. Archived from the original on 28 February 2022.
