= Israel national rugby union team =

Israeli Rugby Team

Israel
- Union: Rugby Israel
- Head coach: Kevin Musikanth
- Captain: Adrian Rainstein
First colours

World Rugby ranking
- Current: 62 (as of 8 June 2026)
- Highest: 56 (4 April 2022)

First international
- Switzerland 9 – 9 Israel (25 May 1981)

Biggest win
- Finland 8 – 70 Israel (2 May 2009)

Biggest defeat
- Netherlands 56 – 0 Israel (3 November 1993)

The Israel national rugby union team (Hebrew: נבחרת ישראל ברוגבי) is governed by Rugby Israel, which oversees all rugby union in Israel. As of 24 January 2022, Israel is ranked 62nd in the World Rugby Rankings.

Their home ground is at the Wingate Institute in Netanya, Central District, known for its large number of immigrants from English-speaking countries.

== History ==
The sport was brought to the country by British soldiers during the Mandate era, but petered out after the British left. A wave of immigration from English-speaking countries since 1967 has seen renewed interest in the sport, particularly in areas with large English-speaking populations such as Ra'anana and Jerusalem.

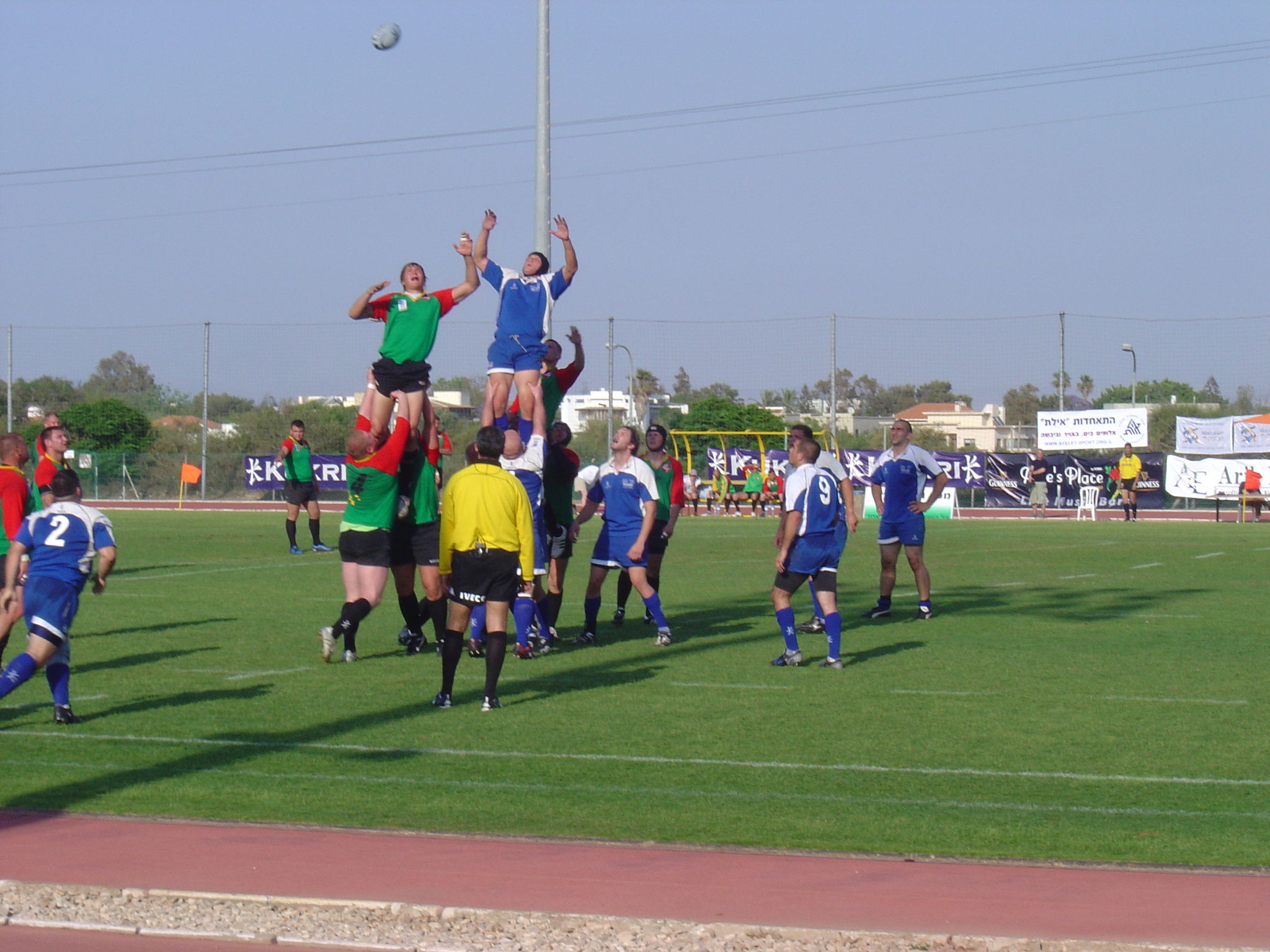
Israel playing Lithuania in 2009.

A national league was set up in 1972, and the Israel Rugby Union (now Rugby Israel) formed in 1975. Israel's first international match was away to Switzerland on 25 May 1981, and ended 9–9.

The Union joined the International Rugby Board in 1988, and participated in the European section of the qualifying rounds for the 1991 Rugby World Cup. In a group with Denmark, Sweden and Switzerland, Israel lost all three matches, but were by no means humiliated.

In the qualifying matches for the 1995 World Cup, Israel thrashed Hungary 67–8 in the preliminary round, before being knocked out in the Round 1 group stage, failing to score a point in two of their three games.

The qualifying matches for the 1999 Rugby World Cup followed the established pattern, with Israel being knocked out in the group stage, though they avoided finishing bottom of their five-team group by beating Austria.

The same happened in the 2003 WC qualifiers, where they finished fourth in a six team group. In the 2007 WC qualifiers they did not even make it to the group stage, being thrashed 113–7 on aggregate (0–53, 60–7) by Lithuania.

Israel beat Slovenia by 26–19 at 11 May 2009, but lost to Lithuania by 3–19 at 23 May 2009, ending their campaign for the 2011 Rugby World Cup qualifyings. These were the first ever games of Israel to be televised.

In the 2015 Rugby World Cup qualifyings, Israel won Division 2B of Europe qualification, defeating all opponents and being promoted to the play-off round.

== Record ==
=== World Cup ===
World Cup record								World Cup Qualification record					
Year	Round	P	W	D	L	F	A	P	W	D	L	F	A
(Australia) (New Zealand) 1987	Not Invited							Not Invited					
(United Kingdom) (Ireland) (France) 1991	did not qualify							3	0	0	3	31	64
(South Africa) 1995	did not qualify							4	1	0	3	77	118
(Wales) 1999	did not qualify							4	1	1	2	46	73
(Australia) 2003	did not qualify							5	2	0	3	134	83
(France) 2007	did not qualify							2	0	0	2	7	113
(New Zealand) 2011	did not qualify							6	5	0	1	165	64
(England) 2015	did not qualify							6	5	0	1	171	109
(Japan) 2019	did not qualify							4	3	0	1	135	100
(France) 2023	did not qualify							Automatically eliminated					
Total	0/9	0	0	0	0	0	0	34	17	1	16	766	724

=== European Competitions Since 2000 ===
Season	Division	G	W	D	L	PF	PA	+/−	Pts	Pos
2000	European Nations Cup Fourth Division Pool 2	3	1	0	2	54	53	+1	5	3rd
2001-02	European Nations Cup Third Division Pool 2	4	0	0	4	72	122	-50	4	5th
2002-03	European Nations Cup Third Division Pool C	2	1	0	1	53	38	+15		2nd
2003-04	European Nations Cup Third Division Pool C	2	1	0	1	24	63	-39		2nd
2004-06	European Nations Cup Third Division Pool C	4	2	0	2	97	52	+45	8	3rd
2006-08	European Nations Cup Third Division 3C	8	3	0	5	141	158	-17	14	4th
2008-10	European Nations Cup Third Division 3C	8	8	0	0	257	59	+198	24	1st
2010-12	European Nations Cup Second Division 2C	8	7	0	1	186	97	+89	30	1st
2012-14	European Nations Cup Second Division 2B	8	7	0	1	212	109	+103	33	1st
2014-16	European Nations Cup Second Division 2A	4	0	1	3	77	102	-25	3	5th
2016-17	Rugby Europe Conference 1 South	4	3	0	1	135	100	+35	14	2nd
2017-18	Rugby Europe Conference 1 South	4	2	0	2	105	86	+19	10	3rd
2018-19	Rugby Europe Conference 1 South	4	2	0	2	104	62	+42	11	3rd
2019-20	Rugby Europe Conference 1 South	2	0	1	1	38	67	-29	2	5th
2021-22*	Rugby Europe Conference 1 South	1	0	0	1	13	15	-2	1	3rd

=== Overall ===
Below is a table of the representative rugby matches played by a Israel national XV at test level up until 5 April 2025, updated after match with Malta.

Opponent	Played	Won	Lost	Drawn	% Won
Andorra	6	4	2	0	66.67%
Armenia	2	0	2	0	0%
Austria	4	3	1	0	75%
Azerbaijan	1	1	0	0	100%
Bosnia and Herzegovina	6	4	2	0	66.67%
Bulgaria	6	4	2	0	66.67%
Croatia	8	1	7	0	12.5%
Cyprus	5	5	0	0	100%
Czech Republic	4	0	3	1	0%
Denmark	5	3	2	0	60%
Finland	5	4	1	0	80%
Greece	2	2	0	0	100%
Hungary	4	3	1	0	75%
Latvia	3	1	2	0	33.33%
Lithuania	4	0	4	0	0%
Luxembourg	9	6	3	0	66.67%
Malta	8	2	6	0	25%
Moldova	1	0	1	0	0%
Monaco	1	1	0	0	100%
Netherlands	2	0	2	0	0%
Norway	5	4	1	0	80%
Serbia	2	2	0	0	100%
Slovenia	6	3	2	1	50%
Sweden	3	0	3	0	0%
Switzerland	7	0	5	2	0%
Ukraine	1	0	1	0	0%
Yugoslavia	3	0	3	0	0%
Total	113	53	56	4	46.9%

== Recent Matches ==
Matches

13 November 2021
13:00 CET (UTC+01)

Malta	15–13	Israel (1 LBP)
	Report

Tony Bezzina stadium, Paola
Attendance: 0
Referee: Pedro Mendes-Silva (Portugal)

== Current squad ==
The following players were included in the squad for the 2021–22 Rugby Europe Conference South 1 match against Malta on 13 November 2021.

Head Coach: (South Africa) Kevin Musikanth

Note: Flags indicate national union for the club/province as defined by World Rugby.

Player	Position	Date of birth (age)	Caps	Club/province
Yaron Harris	Prop	25 June 1993 (age 32)		
Tomer Bracha	Hooker	28 August 1990 (age 35)		
Nitsan Reizel	Prop	27 December 1997 (age 28)		(Israel) Tel Aviv Heat
Thomas Burden	Lock	29 October 1996 (age 29)		(Israel) Tel Aviv Heat
Yotam Shulman	Lock	4 April 1995 (age 31)		(Israel) Tel Aviv Heat
Yiftach Engel	Flanker	11 February 1994 (age 32)		(Israel) Tel Aviv Heat
Ushangi Manjavidze	Flanker	29 June 1998 (age 27)		
Uri Gail	Number 8	10 February 1996 (age 30)		(France) Beaune
Omer Levinson	Scrum-half	4 July 1999 (age 26)		(Israel) Tel Aviv Heat
Mati Gordon	Fly-half	16 January 2000 (age 26)		(Israel) Tel Aviv Heat
Adrian Rainstein (c)	Wing	13 September 2000 (age 25)		
Michael Eli	Centre	13 September 1999 (age 26)		
Idan Eisenberg	Centre	28 November 2000 (age 25)		(Israel) Tel Aviv Heat
Gal Aviram	Wing	10 August 2000 (age 25)		
Vitalii Pryimak	Fullback	29 May 2000 (age 26)		(Israel) ASA Tel Aviv Rugby Club
Eirad Barkai	Flanker	28 November 2000 (age 25)		(Israel) Tel Aviv Heat
Alan Dodin	Fullback	1 January 2000 (age 26)		(Israel) Tel Aviv Heat
Yitzhak Hirsch	??	20 November 1998 (age 27)		
Maayan Shaked	Lock	28 November 1999 (age 26)		(Israel) Tel Aviv Heat
Yahel Rozillio	Lock	29 January 1999 (age 27)		(Israel) Tel Aviv Heat
Eitan Humphreys	Flanker	21 February 1990 (age 36)		
Daniel Stein	Fly-half	1 October 2000 (age 25)		

== Maccabiah Games ==
Israel is unique amongst the Maccabiah Games teams for two reasons, firstly it is the only true national team competing, and secondly, non-Jews who are Israeli citizens can qualify for it.

== See also ==
- Rugby union in Israel
- Israel national rugby sevens team
