= 2003 Africa Cup, second division =

2003 Africa Cup second division
Tournament details
- Date: 9 September– 20 December 2003
- Teams: 12

Final positions
- Champions: Cameroon
- Runner-up: Zambia

Tournament statistics
- Matches played: 21

The 2003 Africa Cup second division was the second edition of lower level rugby union tournament in Africa. The teams were divided in two zones, with a final between the winner of each zone.

== South Zone ==
In the South Zone, played in Lusaka, four teams were involved. Uganda played with the second team, after the promotion of first team in the first division.

=== Semifinals ===
9 September 2003

Uganda A	100 - 0	Burundi

Lusaka

9 September 2003

Zambia	107 - 9	Rwanda

Lusaka

=== Finals ===
- Third place

13 September 2003

Burundi	7 - 18	Rwanda

Lusaka

- First place

13 September 2003

Zambia	44 - 17	Uganda A

Lusaka

== North Zone ==
Played in Bamako, with eight teams divided in two pools of four.

=== Pool 1 ===
Pos.	Team	Pld	W	D	L	PF	PA	BP	Pts
1	Mali	3	3	0	0	98	24	1	13
2	Nigeria	3	2	0	1	77	31	2	10
3	Senegal	3	1	0	2	37	30	2	6
4	Benin	3	0	0	3	5	132	0	0

5 October 2003

Nigeria	8 - 6	Senegal

Bamako

5 October 2003

Mali	56 - 0	Benin

Bamako

8 October 2003

Mali	25 - 18	Nigeria

Bamako

8 October 2003

Senegal	25 - 5	Benin

Bamako

10 October 2003

Nigeria	51 - 0	Benin

Bamako

10 October 2003

Mali	17 - 6	Senegal

Bamako

=== Pool 2 ===
Pos.	Team	Pld	W	D	L	PF	PA	BP	Pts
1	Cameroon	3	3	0	0	201	6	3	15
2	Ghana	3	2	0	1	46	57	1	9
3	Togo	3	1	0	2	28	101	1	5
4	Mauritania	3	0	0	3	15	126	0	0

5 October 2003

Cameroon	80 - 3	Togo

Bamako

5 October 2003

Ghana	29 - 8	Mauritania

Bamako

8 October 2003

Cameroon	40 - 3	Ghana

Bamako

8 October 2003

Togo	16 - 7	Mauritania

Bamako

10 October 2003

Cameroon	81 - 0	Mauritania

Bamako

10 October 2003

Ghana	14 - 9	Togo

Bamako

=== Finals ===
- Seventh place final

12 October 2003

Benin	6 - 0	Mauritania

Bamako

- Fifth place final

12 October 2003

Senegal	8 - 6	Togo

Bamako

- Third place final

12 October 2003

Ghana	3 - 29	Nigeria

Bamako

- First place final

12 October 2003

Cameroon	49 - 0	Mali

Bamako

== Final ==
The final of the tournament, between the winner of each zone, was played in Chingola, Zambia and was won by Cameroon.

20 December 2003

Zambia	13 - 17	Cameroon

Chingola

== See also ==
- 2003 Africa Cup
