= Lithuania national rugby union team =

National rugby union team

Lithuania
- Nickname: Vytis (The Knights)
- Emblem: Vytis (Knight Riding on a Horse)
- Union: Lietuvos Regbio Federacija
- Head coach: Gediminas Marcišauskas
- Captain: Tautvydas Krasauskas
- Most caps: Mindaugas Misevičius; Laurynas Tipelis (45)
- Top scorer: Kęstutis Marcišaukas (372)
- Home stadium: Šiaulių Savivaldybės Stadionas

World Rugby ranking
- Current: 55 (as of 16 July 2025)
- Highest: 34 (2018, 2019)
- Lowest: 70 (2005)

First international
- Germany 31–5 Lithuania (Berlin, Germany; 1 May 1993)

Biggest win
- Serbia 5–77 Lithuania (Belgrade, Serbia; 24 April 2010)

Biggest defeat
- Czech Republic 87–5 Lithuania (Prague, Czech Republic; 28 February 2026)
- Website: regbis.lt

The Lithuania national rugby union team, nicknamed The Knights (Vytis), is one of the tier three teams in European rugby. They currently compete in the second division of the Rugby Europe International Championships in the Rugby Europe Trophy, a competition which is just below the Rugby Europe Championship where the top six countries in Europe (apart from the teams in the Six Nations) compete. They are yet to participate in any Rugby World Cup and play in black with a pattern involving the colours red, yellow and green (the colours of the Lithuanian flag).

== History ==
Rugby was first introduced into Lithuania in 1961. However, as the country was a part of USSR, the national team could not be formed. After the collapse of the USSR, Lithuania could finally form their very own national team where they would start playing unofficial friendlies against Latvia, their traditional rivals as well as representative team from Kaliningrad before finally playing their first official game against Germany, in 1993 where they lost with the score 31-5.

After the reestablishment of independence in 1990, Lithuania's rugby authorities worked to gain international recognition after gaining continental recognition in 1991 by FIRA Europe (as it was known at the time) and by 1993, the national team were participating in the qualifying for the 1995 Rugby World Cup. Lithuania also participated in the 1992-1994 FIRA Trophy competition at the bottom of the pyramid but failed to win any of their games. Later on in 1996, Lithuania had achieved their first official victory against Luxembourg during the qualifying competition for the 1999 World Cup. Overall, the 1990s were a poor decade for the national team, yet it must be considered that they were a relatively new country, never mind the fact that Lithuania started playing test match rugby in 1993.

Up until 2006, Lithuania was lingering in the middle of the third division of the European Nations Cup. However, a 100 percent record in their 2006-2008 European Nations Cup Third Division campaign earned them promotion from Division 3B to Division 3A. This effort was followed by another perfect record in the 2008-2010 European Nations Cup Third Division and a further promotion to Division 2A. Moreover, victories over Israel and the Netherlands would take them to the semifinal round of the European qualification tournament for a spot in the 2011 Rugby World Cup Final Place Play-off. The rise in form of the national had thus resulted in an increase in the popularity of the sport in Lithuania.

During their 2008–10 European Nations Cup campaign, Lithuania was credited with setting a new record for consecutive Test wins in men's rugby. Their 77–5 away win over Serbia on April 24, 2010 was listed as their 18th straight, surpassing the previous record set by New Zealand in 1965–69 and by South Africa in 1997–98. This undefeated campaign, which could have led to a Lithuanian presence at the 2011 Rugby World Cup, ended in the 27–16 loss to Ukraine in the European qualifying semifinal. However, on later review, it was found that the first game in the 18-game sequence was in fact a loss, and as such are now credited with having held an equal record with South Africa and New Zealand (the record would later be broken by Cyprus in 2013).

== Record ==
=== World Cup ===
World Cup record								World Cup Qualification record					
Year	Round	P	W	D	L	F	A	P	W	D	L	F	A
(Australia) (New Zealand) 1987	Part of USSR: Not an independent country							Part of USSR: Not an independent country					
(United Kingdom) (Ireland) (France) 1991	Part of USSR: Not an independent country							Part of USSR: Not an independent country					
(South Africa) 1995	did not qualify							2	0	0	2	11	38
(Wales) 1999	did not qualify							4	1	0	3	70	157
(Australia) 2003	did not qualify							5	2	1	2	127	89
(France) 2007	did not qualify							6	2	0	4	169	130
(New Zealand) 2011	did not qualify							10	9	0	1	239	83
(England) 2015	did not qualify							4	1	0	3	69	109
(Japan) 2019	did not qualify							4	3	0	1	93	47
(France) 2023	did not qualify							Automatically eliminated					
Total	0/9	0	0	0	0	0	0	35	18	1	16	778	653

=== European Competitions ===
Season	Division	G	W	D	L	PF	PA	+/−	Pts	Pos
2000	European Nations Cup Fourth Division Pool 3	2	1	0	1	55	54	+1	4	3rd
2001-02	European Nations Cup Third Division Pool 2	4	3	0	1	87	66	+21	10	2nd
2002-03	European Nations Cup Third Division Pool B	4	3	0	1	147	53	+94	10	2nd
2003-04	European Nations Cup Third Division Pool B	4	2	0	2	89	32	+57	8	3rd
2004-06	European Nations Cup Third Division Pool B	4	2	0	2	94	69	+25	8	3rd
2006-08	European Nations Cup Third Division 3B	8	8	0	0	315	56	+259	24	1st
2008-10	European Nations Cup Third Division 3A	7	7	0	0	198	50	+220	21	1st
2010-12	European Nations Cup Second Division 2A	8	5	1	2	233	125	+108	28	2nd
2012-14	European Nations Cup Second Division 2A	8	2	0	6	149	199	-50	11	5th
2014-16	European Nations Cup Second Division 2B	4	4	0	0	144	75	+69	20	1st (Note: Following Lithuania's win in the European Nations Cup Second Division 2B, Rugby Europe reorganised their international championships for the following season. This resulted in them being placed into the Rugby Europe Conference 1 North for 2016-17.)
2016-17	Rugby Europe Conference 1 North	4	3	0	1	93	47	+46	14	2nd
2017-18	Rugby Europe Conference 1 North	4	4	0	0	127	78	+49	19	1st (Note: Lithuania's first place finish in the 2017–18 Rugby Europe Conference 1 North saw them advance into the Promotion play-off against Rugby Europe Conference 1 South winners Malta which they won 81-10. This resulted in them being promoted into the Rugby Europe Trophy.)
2018-19	Rugby Europe Trophy	5	1	0	4	63	175	-112	5	5th
2019-20	Rugby Europe Trophy	5	1	1	3	61	103	-42	7	5th
2021-22*	Rugby Europe Trophy	5	1	0	4	108	177	-69	5	6th

=== Overall ===
Below is a table of the representative rugby matches played by a Lithuania national XV at test level up until 14 November 2026, updated after match with Sweden.

Opponent	Played	Won	Lost	Drawn	% Won
Andorra	5	4	1	0	80%
Armenia	2	1	1	0	50%
Austria	4	3	1	0	75%
Belgium	3	0	3	0	0%
Bosnia and Herzegovina	2	2	0	0	100%
Bulgaria	5	4	0	1	80%
Croatia	8	4	4	0	50%
Cyprus	2	2	0	0	100%
Czech Republic	6	1	5	0	16.67%
Denmark	3	0	3	0	0%
Germany	3	0	3	0	0%
Hungary	8	6	2	0	75%
Israel	4	4	0	0	100%
Latvia	16	10	6	0	62.5%
Luxembourg	7	5	2	0	71.43%
Malta	7	3	4	0	42.86%
Moldova	3	0	3	0	0%
Monaco	1	1	0	0	100%
Netherlands	6	1	5	0	16.67%
Norway	3	3	0	0	100%
Poland	4	0	4	0	0%
Portugal	1	0	1	0	0%
Serbia	2	2	0	0	100%
Slovenia	2	0	1	1	0%
Sweden	14	2	11	1	14.29%
Switzerland	9	4	5	0	44.44%
Ukraine	8	3	5	0	37.5%
Yugoslavia	1	0	1	0	0%
Total	140	65	72	3	46.43%

== Recent Matches ==
Matches

23 October 2021
14:00 EEST (UTC+03)

(1 LBP) Lithuania	37–39	Ukraine
	Report

Regbio stadionas, Šiauliai
Attendance: 500
Referee: Ethan Glass (Switzerland)

30 October 2021
15:00 EEST (UTC+03)

Lithuania	16–46	Germany (1 TBP)
	Report

Regbio stadionas, Šiauliai
Attendance: 450
Referee: Gert Visser (Netherlands)

13 November 2021
15:30 CET (UTC+01)

Switzerland	20–28	Lithuania
	Report

Centre Sportif de Colovray, Nyon
Referee: Dan O'Connell (Germany)

== Current squad ==
The following players are in the match day squad for the 2021–22 Rugby Europe Trophy game against Switzerland on 13 November 2021.

- Head Coach: (Lithuania) Gediminas Marcišauskas

Note: Flags indicate national union for the club/province as defined by World Rugby.

Player	Position	Date of birth (age)	Caps	Club/province
Tautvydas Mažylis	Prop	16 June 1984 (age 42)		(Lithuania) Azuolas Kaunas
Tomas Zibolis	Hooker	6 October 1981 (age 45)		(Lithuania) BaltRex Šiauliai
Tautrimas Mažylis	Prop	16 August 1984 (age 42)		(Lithuania) Azuolas Kaunas
Povilas Jankauskas	Lock	18 August 1999 (age 27)		(Lithuania) RK Vairas Šiauliai
Mindaugas Kazlauskas	Lock	28 November 1986 (age 39)		(Lithuania) RK Vairas Šiauliai
Martynas Lianzbergas	Back row	28 November 1989 (age 36)		(Lithuania) BaltRex Šiauliai
Donatas Trumpickas	Back row	1 October 1996 (age 30)		(Lithuania) BaltRex Šiauliai
Paulius Strigūnas	Back row	28 November 1987 (age 38)		(Lithuania) RK Vairas Šiauliai
Tautvydas Krasauskas (c)	Scrum-half	8 September 1995 (age 31)		(Lithuania) Azuolas Kaunas
Eimantas Bagarauskas	Fly-half	16 August 1987 (age 39)		(Lithuania) Azuolas Kaunas
Jonas Mikalčius	Wing	15 January 1994 (age 32)		
Dovydas Taujanskas	Centre	1 January 2000 (age 26)		(Lithuania) RK Geležinis Vilkas
Vytaras Bloškys	Centre	30 August 1991 (age 35)		(Lithuania) BaltRex Šiauliai
Domantas Bagužis	Wing	17 April 1997 (age 29)		(Lithuania) Azuolas Kaunas
Donatas Vilimavičius	Fullback	11 September 1993 (age 33)		(Lithuania) RK Vairas Šiauliai
Povilas Jurgelionis	??	28 November 2000 (age 25)		(Lithuania) Azuolas Kaunas
Daivaras Jonaitis	??	4 June 1999 (age 27)		(Lithuania) RK Vairas Šiauliai
Tomas Mačiulis	??	18 March 1998 (age 28)		(Lithuania) RK Vairas Šiauliai
Zilvinas Kungys	??	28 November 1998 (age 27)		(Lithuania) RK Vairas Šiauliai
Tomas Bagdonas	??	16 August 1994 (age 32)		(Lithuania) RK Vairas Šiauliai
Kęstutis Marcišauskas	??	24 July 1985 (age 41)		(Lithuania) RK Vairas Šiauliai
Matas Miežys	??	28 November 1992 (age 33)		(Lithuania) BaltRex Šiauliai
Justinas Vasiliauskas	??	29 January 1988 (age 38)		(Lithuania) RK Vairas Šiauliai

=== Recent call-ups ===
The following players have also been called up to the squad within the last 12 months.

Player	Pos	Date of birth (age)	Caps	Club	Latest call-up
Lukas Gylys	Prop			(Lithuania) BaltRex Šiauliai	v. Germany, 30 October 2021
Naglis Dunčikas	Lock			(Lithuania) Azuolas Kaunas	v. Germany, 30 October 2021
Airidas Savickas	Lock			(Lithuania) RK Vairas Šiauliai	v. Ukraine, 23 October 2021
Domantas Tautkus	Back row	2 June 1993 (age 28)		(Lithuania) Azuolas Kaunas	v. Germany, 30 October 2021
Deniss Aleksejevs	Back row			(Lithuania) RK Geležinis Vilkas	v. Ukraine, 23 October 2021
Kęstutis Riskus	Back row			(Lithuania) RK Vairas Šiauliai	v. Ukraine, 23 October 2021
Alanas Alasauskis	Centre			(Lithuania) Azuolas Kaunas	v. Ukraine, 23 October 2021
Rokas Lipnickas				(Lithuania) RK Vairas Šiauliai	v. Germany, 30 October 2021
Domas Malinauskas				(Lithuania) Azuolas Kaunas	v. Ukraine, 23 October 2021

== Current coaching staff ==
The current coaching staff of the Lithuanian national team:

Name	Nationality	Role
Austeja Minkeviciute	LTU	Manager
Gediminas Marcišauskas	LTU	Head coach
Zygimantas Radzius	LTU	Assistant coach
Dr Liutkus	LTU	Team doctor
Arūnas Auga	LTU	Physiotherapist
Mantvydas Tveraga	LTU	Water Carrier

=== Former coaches ===
Name	Years	Tests	Won	Drew	Lost	Win percentage
(Lithuania) Simon Verbickas	2021	1	0	0	1	0%
(Lithuania) Gediminas Marcišauskas	2021	2	1	0	1	50%

== See also ==
- Rugby union in Lithuania
- Lietuvos Regbio Federacija
- Lithuania national rugby sevens team
- Lithuania women's national rugby sevens team
- Sport in Lithuania
