= 2003 Rugby World Cup – repechage qualification =

There were two repechage positions available in qualification for the 2003 Rugby World Cup. The USA and Tonga would eventually qualify through the two positions. Russia had originally qualified for Repechage as Europe 5, but Russia were ejected from the competition for using ineligible South African players and were replaced by Spain.

The first round was rescheduled as a single match at a neutral site due to logistical issues caused by delays resulting from the investigation and subsequent ejection of Russia.

== Repechage 1 ==
=== Round 1 ===
Spain advanced to Round 2.

Team 1	Score	Team 2
Spain	33–16	Tunisia

15 March 2003

Spain	33–16	Tunisia

Valence d'Agen, France

=== Round 2 ===
USA qualified to Pool B of the 2003 Rugby World Cup as Repechage 1.

Team 1	Agg.	Team 2	1st leg	2nd leg
Spain	26–120	United States	13–62	13–58

12 April 2003

Spain	13–62	United States

Madrid, Spain

27 April 2003

United States	58–13	Spain

Fort Lauderdale, Florida

== Repechage 2 ==
Tonga qualified to Pool D of the 2003 Rugby World Cup as Repechage 2.

Team 1	Agg.	Team 2	1st leg	2nd leg
South Korea	0–194	Tonga	0–75	0–119

15 March 2003

South Korea	0–75	Tonga

Gwangju, South Korea

21 March 2003

Tonga	119–0	South Korea

Nukuʻalofa, Tonga
