= 2003 South American Rugby Championship "A" =

25th edition of the South American Rugby Championship

25° Campeonato Sudamericano de Rugby
Tournament details
- Host: Uruguay
- Date: 27 April– 3 May 2003
- Countries: Argentina; Chile; Paraguay; Uruguay

Final positions
- Champions: Argentina
- Runner-up: Uruguay
- Relegated: Paraguay

Tournament statistics
- Matches played: 6

The 2003 South American Rugby Championship was the 25th edition of the competition of the leading national rugby union teams in South America.

The tournament was played in Montevideo, with four teams participating. Paraguay and Brazil (winner of the 2002 "B" championship played before a play-off to obtain qualification.

Argentina won the tournament.

== Preliminary ==
23 March 2003

Paraguay	27–16	Brazil

cancha del CURDA, Asunción

== Final phase ==
=== Standings ===
Three points for victory, two for a draw, and one for a loss

Team	Played	Won	Drawn	Lost	For	Against	Difference	Pts
Argentina	3	3	0	0	225	3	+ 222	9
Uruguay	3	2	0	1	73	52	+ 21	7
Chile	3	1	0	2	118	69	+ 49	5
Paraguay	3	0	0	3	7	299	292	3

== Results ==
- First round

27 April 2003

Argentina	144–0	Paraguay

Estadio Luis Franzini, Montevideo

27 April 2003

Uruguay	20–3	Chile

Estadio Luis Franzini, Montevideo

- Second round

30 April 2003

Argentina	49–3	Chile

Country los Teros, Montevideo

30 April 2003

Uruguay	53–7	Paraguay

Estadio Luis Franzini, Montevideo

- Third round

3 May 2003

Argentina	32–0	Uruguay

Estadio Luis Franzini, Montevideo

3 May 2003

Chile	102–0	Paraguay

Estadio Luis Franzini, Montevideo
