= Moldova national rugby union team =

National rugby union team

Moldova
- Nickname: Haiducii (The Outlaws)
- Union: Moldovan Rugby Federation
- Head coach: Sergiu Motoc
- Captain: Alexandru Mutean
- Most caps: Timur Ungurean (67)
- Top scorer: Timur Ungurean (500)
- Top try scorer: Oleg Prepelița (27)
- Home stadium: Gelu Memorial Stadium
First colours	Second colours

World Rugby ranking
- Current: 59 (as of 28 July 2025)
- Highest: 25 (2014)
- Lowest: 59 (2020)

First international
- Moldova 22–6 Lithuania (Moldova; 10 October 1991)

Biggest win
- Moldova 58–8 Malta (Chișinău, Moldova; 18 November 2000)

Biggest defeat
- Moldova 5–65 Croatia (10 May 1997)
- Website: www.rugby.md

The Moldova national rugby union team, nicknamed le steelers, are a Rugby Europe national team that play in the Conference 2 North competition and are administered by the Moldovan Rugby Federation. They are yet to qualify for the Rugby World Cup.

== History ==
Moldova played their first international on October 10, 1991 against Lithuania. Moldova won the match, 22 points to six. The next year they played against Bulgaria, which Moldova won, 42 points to three. Moldova played Hungary in 1995, which they won, by three points, 17 to 14.

They played Georgia, who defeated them 47 to five. They then played Ukraine and Latvia and Bulgaria soon after.

Moldova played twice in 1997, defeating Norway and losing to Croatia. They won a number of fixtures in 2000. They played the Netherlands the following year. The national rugby team was designated by the members of Moldova's Sports Press Association as the best Moldovan team in 2004. Following this, they played in qualifying tournaments for the 2007 Rugby World Cup European qualifiers. Moldova were grouped in Pool B of the second round, and they won two of their four matches, which saw them finish second in their pool behind Germany, and thus move onto round three and enter Pool A in round 3.

However, their road to the World Cup was ended when a respectful 2nd place above Poland, Netherlands and Andorra was not enough to proceed to round 4.

== Popularity ==
The popularity of rugby in Moldova is growing rapidly, with well over 1,250 fans regularly turning up to their home matches in the European Nations Cup. Since 2004, the number of Moldovan rugby players has more than doubled, due to the national team's growing international reputation.

== Notable players ==
Moldovan international Alexei Cotruţa was the top try-scorer in the Russian Professional Rugby League in 2006, scoring 16 tries in 14 matches for Moscow-area side VVA-Podmoskovye.

During March 2011, Vadim Cobîlaş signed for Aviva Premiership side, Sale Sharks. Shortly after, his younger brother Maxim Cobîlaş also signed for Aviva Premiership side, Sale Sharks making the two the first Moldovan players to sign for a professional English team. More recently, props Dmitri Arhip and Gheorghe Gajion have signed for two Welsh regional sides, Cardiff Blues and Ospreys.

On the 23rd of August 2018, Cristian Ojovan another prop made his debut for D2 side Aurillacois. After his impressive performances at Aurillacois, George Ojovan signed with Top 14 champions Clermont Auvergne during October 2019.

== Overall Record ==
Below is a table of the representative rugby matches played by a Moldova national XV at test level up until 25 April 2026, updated after match with Bulgaria.

Against	Played	Won	Lost	Drawn	Win percentage
Andorra	1	1	0	0	100%
Austria	3	2	1	0	66.67%
Belgium	9	2	7	0	22.22%
Bulgaria	6	5	1	0	83.33%
Croatia	1	0	1	0	0%
Czech Republic	8	4	4	0	50%
Denmark	3	2	1	0	66.67%
Finland	1	0	1	0	0%
Georgia	1	0	1	0	0%
Germany	7	3	4	0	42.86%
Hungary	4	3	1	0	75%
Israel	1	1	0	0	100%
Latvia	4	1	3	0	25%
Lithuania	3	3	0	0	100%
Luxembourg	3	1	2	0	33.33%
Malta	2	2	0	0	100%
Monaco	1	1	0	0	100%
Netherlands	10	5	5	0	50%
Norway	1	1	0	0	100%
Poland	10	5	4	1	50%
Portugal	2	0	2	0	0%
Serbia	2	2	0	0	100%
Serbia and Montenegro	2	1	0	1	50%
Slovenia	2	0	2	0	0%
Spain	1	0	1	0	0%
Sweden	5	3	2	0	60%
Switzerland	2	0	2	0	0%
Turkey	3	3	0	0	100%
Ukraine	12	7	5	0	58.33%
Yugoslavia	2	1	1	0	50%
Total	112	59	51	2	52.68%

== Current squad ==
This is Moldova`s current squad for the 2022-23 for Rugby Europe Conference 2 North.

Note: Flags indicate national union for the club/province as defined by World Rugby.

Player	Position	Date of birth (age)	Caps	Club/province
Alexandru Mutean	Hooker	2 February 2004 (age 22)	69	(Republic of Ireland) Confey College
Marius Cardasim	Hooker	30 September 2001 (age 24)	2	(Moldova) RC Sporting ASEM
Valeriu Belous	Prop	28 November 2000 (age 25)	2	(Moldova) RC Ciorescu
Vlad Braniște	Prop	13 March 1990 (age 36)	2	(Moldova) RC Sergus Soroca
Maxim Cobîlaș	Prop	12 August 1986 (age 39)	42	(Russia) VVA-Podmoskovie
Alexandru Colev	Prop	2 February 1997 (age 29)	10	Unattached
Ruslan Dorogan	Prop	4 October 1993 (age 32)	5	(Republic of Ireland) Clonakilty RFC
Andrei Lungu	Prop	28 November 1995 (age 30)	7	(Malta) Kavallieri RFC
Tudor Cojocaru	Lock	13 September 2000 (age 25)	4	(Moldova) RC Sporting ASEM
Andrei Mahu	Lock	3 September 1991 (age 34)	24	(England) London Irish
Andrei Romanov	Lock	10 December 1984 (age 41)	46	Unattached
Dorin Boțan	Flanker	9 February 1996 (age 30)	6	Unattached
Cristin Buzenco	Flanker	19 May 1993 (age 33)	2	(Moldova) CSR Sporting
Petru Crețu	Flanker	20 August 1995 (age 30)	3	(Moldova) LIMPS
Igor Orghianu	Flanker	31 October 1991 (age 34)	6	(Moldova) RC Sporting ASEM
Sergiu Budaian	Number 8	22 September 1989 (age 36)	9	(Moldova) CR UTM
Grigore Pahom	Scrum-half	22 September 1999 (age 26)	2	(Italy) Unione Rugbistica Anconitana
Vadim Preguza	Scrum-half	26 November 1993 (age 32)	14	(Moldova) RC Sporting ASEM
Ion Puică	Scrum-half	21 February 1987 (age 39)	3	(Italy) CUS Perugia Rugby
Dumitru Bețliu	Fly-half	25 February 2000 (age 26)	1	(Moldova) RC Sporting ASEM
Mihai Golubenco (c)	Fly-half	21 November 1994 (age 31)	20	Unattached
Alexandru Matveev	Fly-half	2 June 1989 (age 37)	3	(Moldova) RC Sporting ASEM
Alexandru Bulgac	Centre	14 August 1994 (age 31)	1	Unattached
Ion Bușilă	Centre	2 June 1986 (age 40)	4	(Moldova) CSR Lupii Albi
Igor Mișin	Centre	29 October 1989 (age 36)	9	(Moldova) CR UTM
Ion Dinu	Wing	27 December 1989 (age 36)	2	(Moldova) RC Ciorescu
Mihail Boian	Wing	28 November 1997 (age 28)	9	Unattached
Ion Constantin	Wing	13 January 1997 (age 29)	8	(Moldova) RC Ciorescu
Adrian Adam	Fullback	31 May 1995 (age 31)	9	Unattached
Sandu Gritenco	Fullback	28 November 2001 (age 24)	1	(Moldova) RC Ciorescu
Alexei Isaac	Fullback	8 November 2000 (age 25)	2	(Moldova) RC Ciorescu
