= Cessange =

District of Luxembourg City, Luxembourg

Cessange: Zéisseng (Luxembourgish); Zessingen (German)
- District
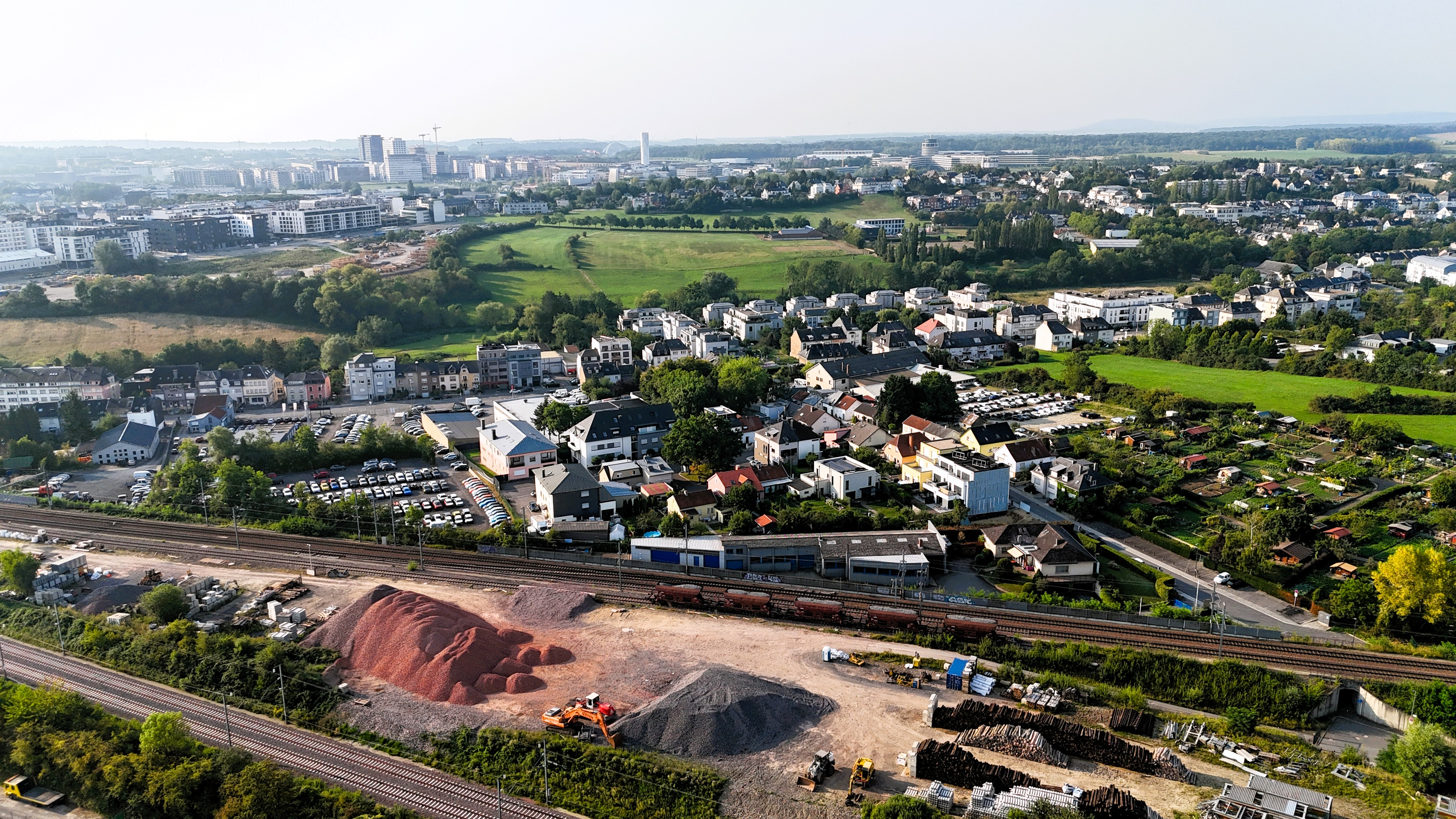

- Cessange is one of 24 districts in Luxembourg City
- Coordinates: 49°35′17″N 6°06′15″E
- Country: Luxembourg
- Commune: Luxembourg City

Area
  - Total: 6.5783 km^{2} (2.5399 sq mi)

Population (31 December 2025)
  - Total: 5,214
  - Density: 792.6/km^{2} (2,053/sq mi)

Nationality
  - Luxembourgish: 33.72%
  - Other: 66.28%
- Website: Cessange

Cessange (French pronunciation: [sɛsɑ̃ʒ]; Luxembourgish: Zéisseng [ˈtsɜɪ̯seŋ]; German: Zessingen [ˈtsɛsɪŋən]) is a district in south-western Luxembourg City, in southern Luxembourg.

Most of the district is covered by open fields to the south-west of Luxembourg City proper. At the centre of the district is the Croix de Cessange: a motorway junction between the A4 and the A6. Next to the intersection is Stade Boy Konen, which plays host to FC CeBra 01, Rugby Club Luxembourg, and the Luxembourg national rugby union team.

== Population ==
As of 31 December 2025, Cessange has a population of 5,214 inhabitants.

== Gallery ==
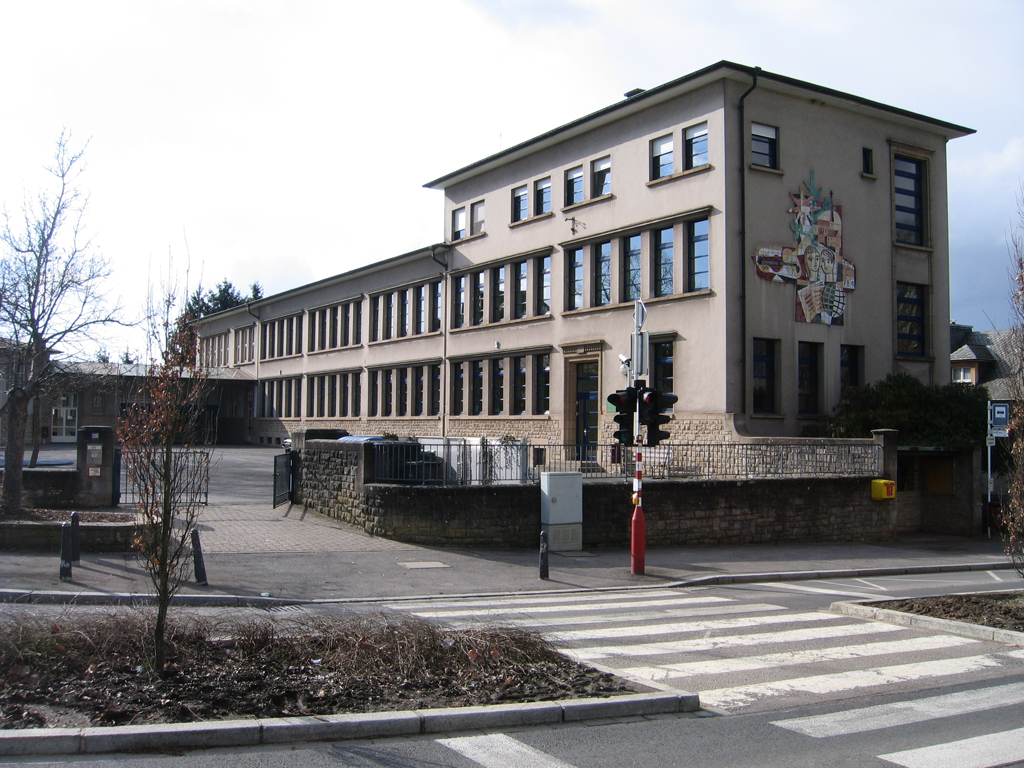
The primary school

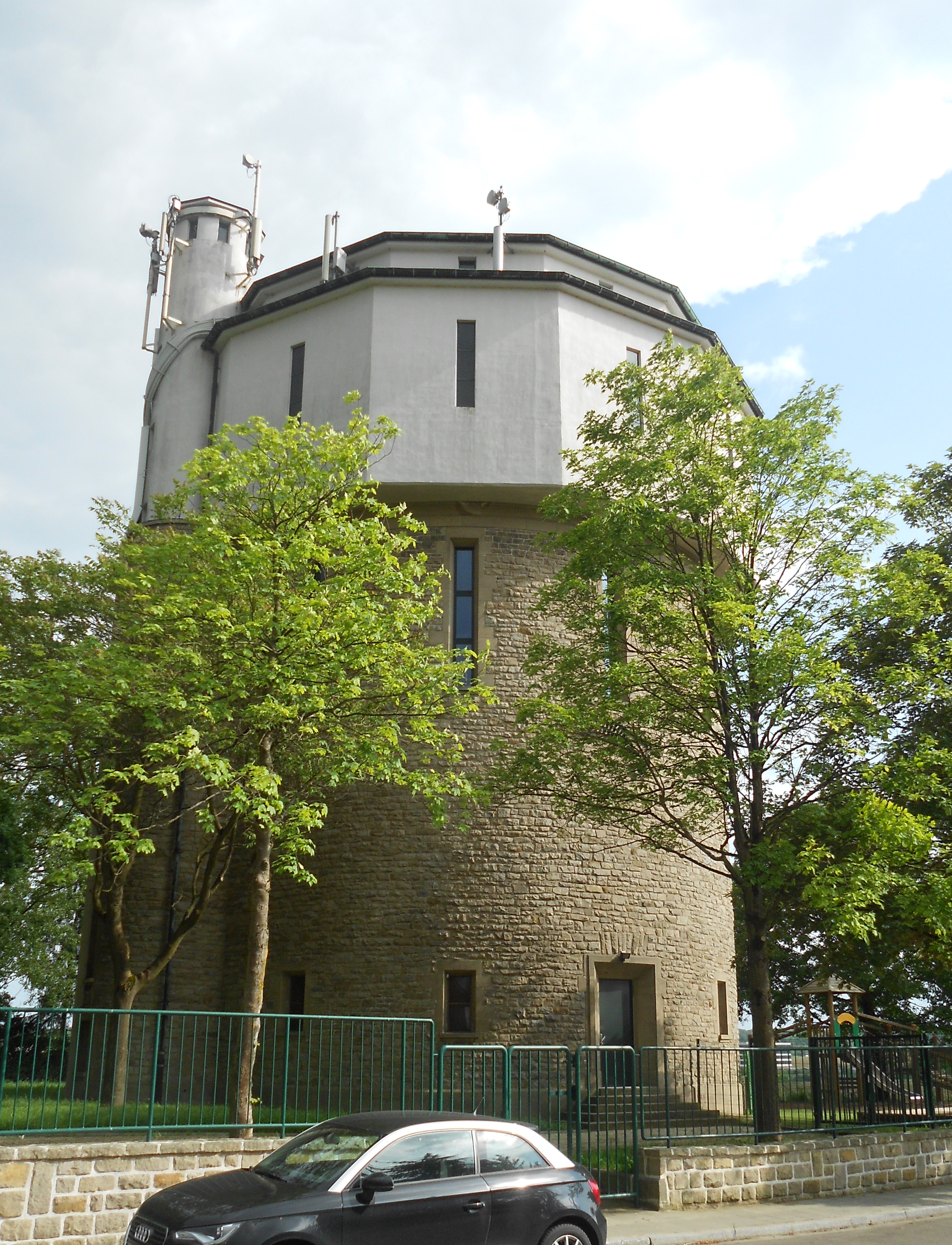
The water tower

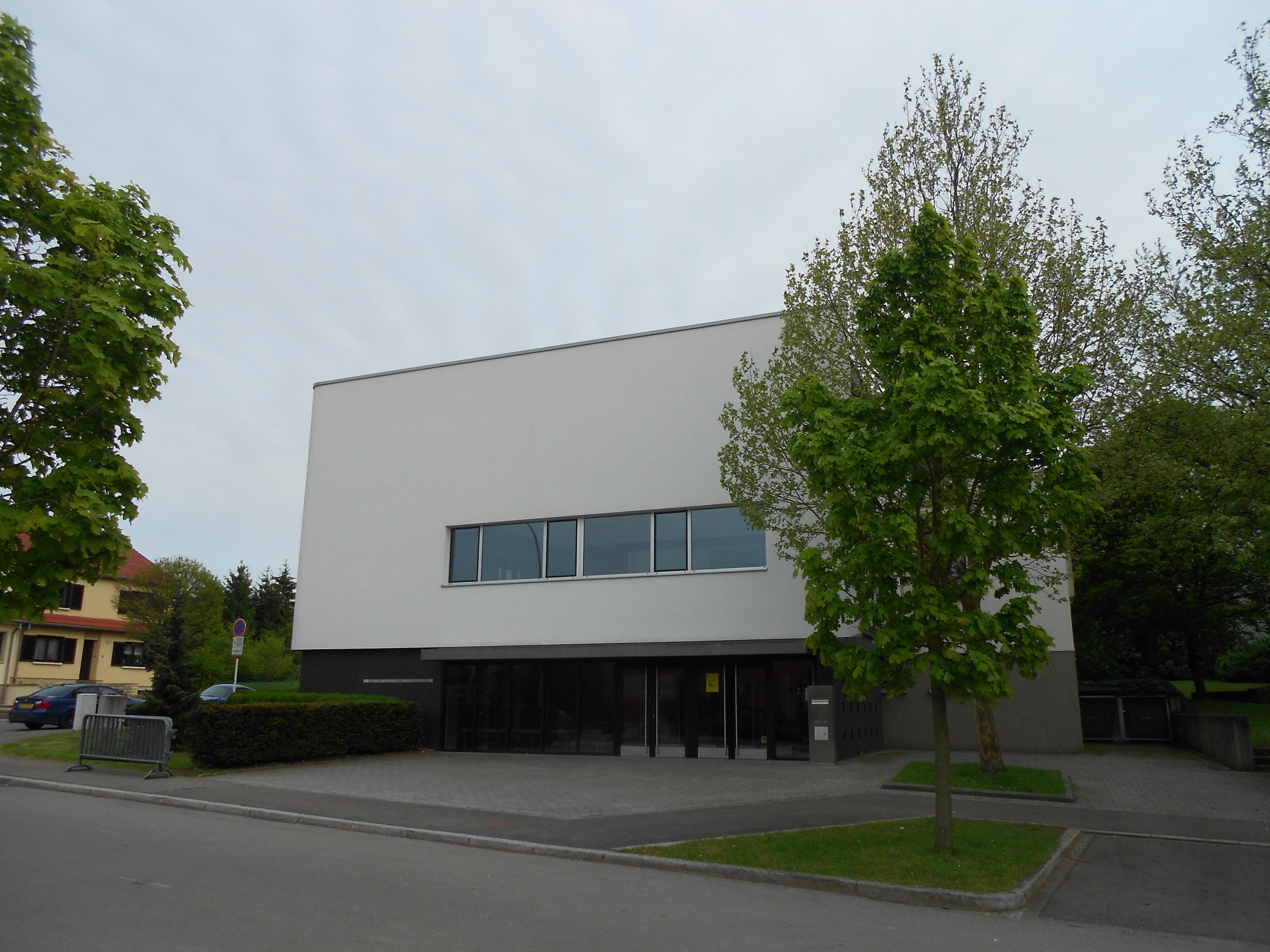
The cultural center

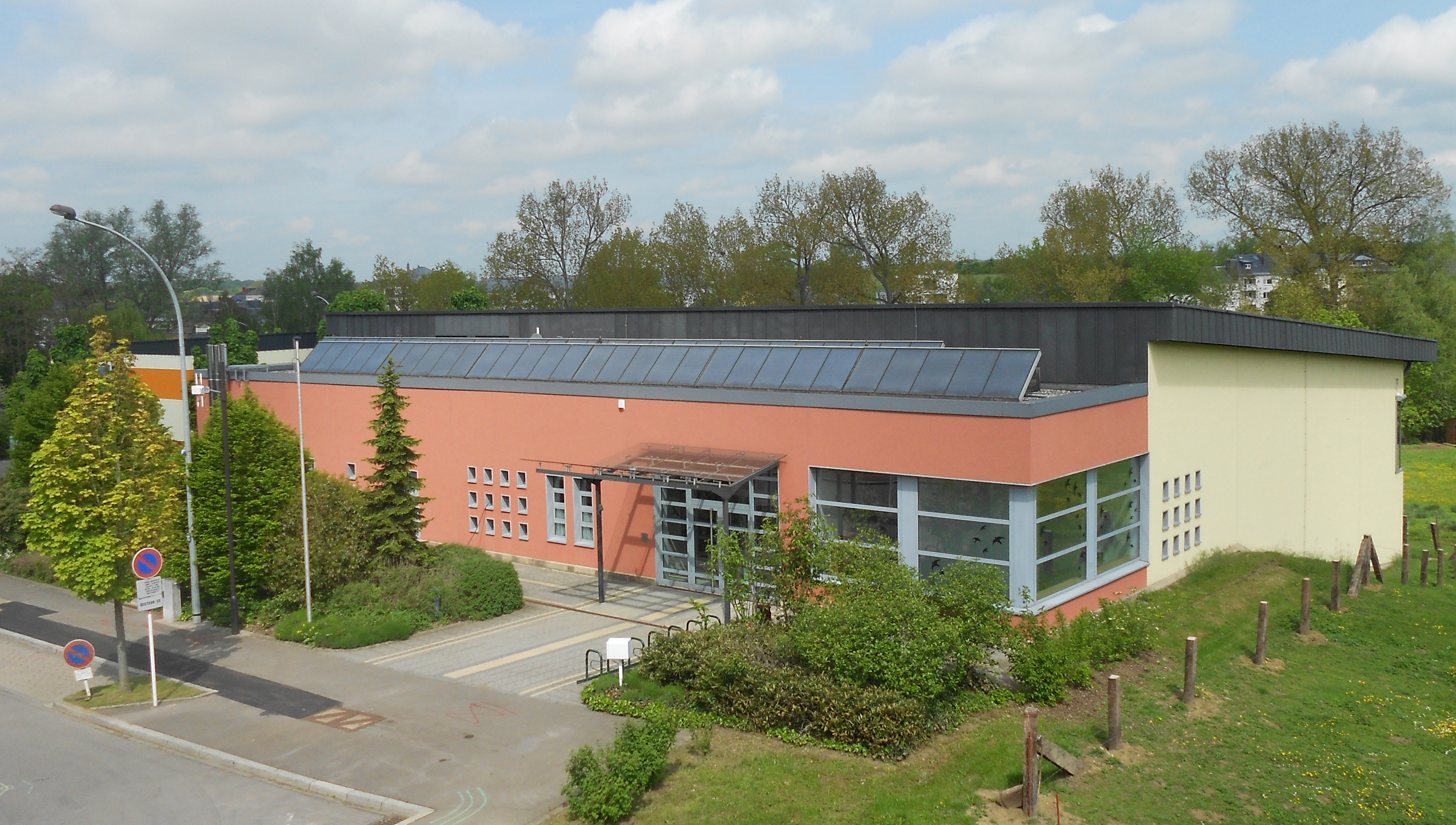
The sports center

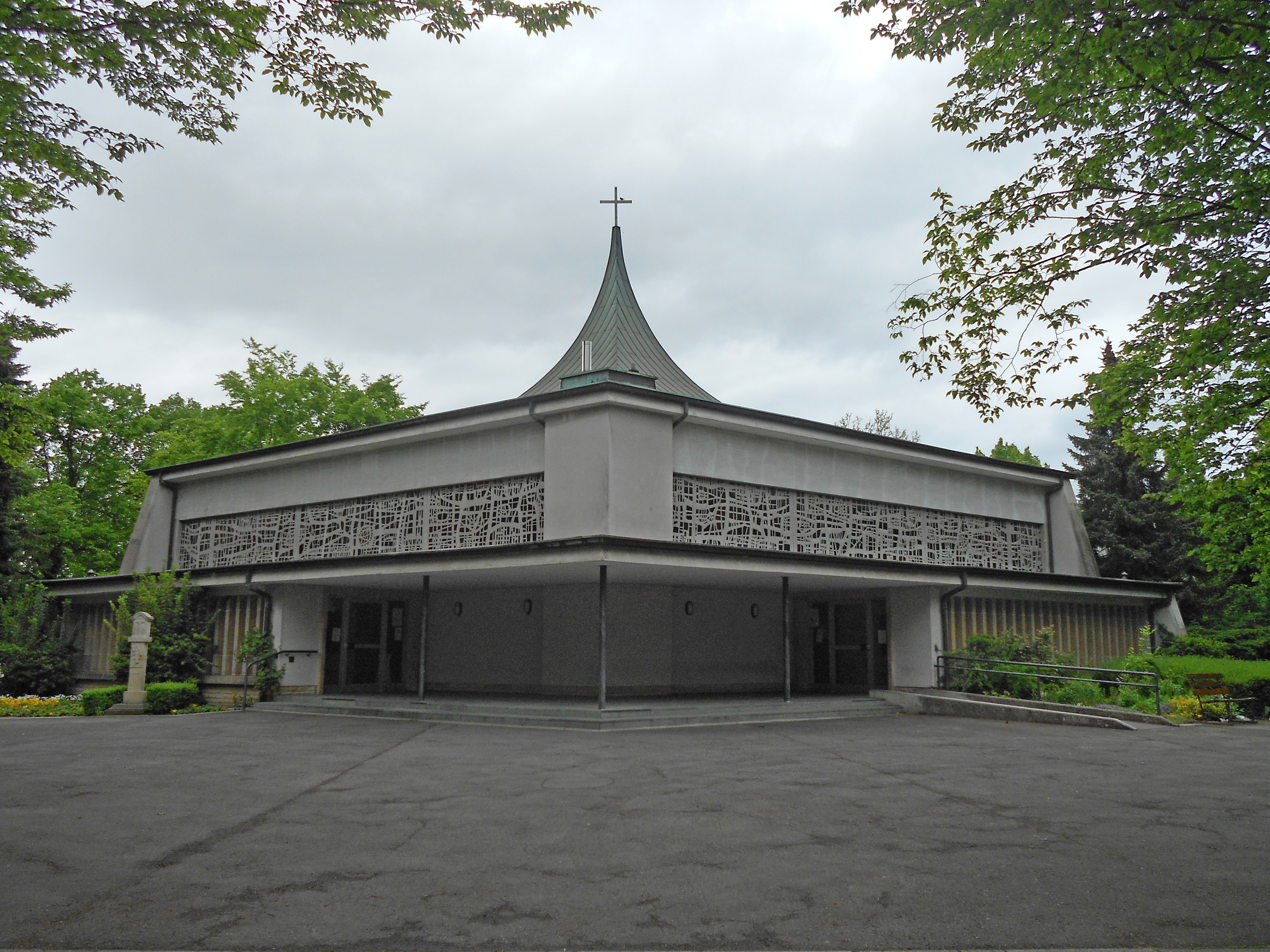
The catholic church

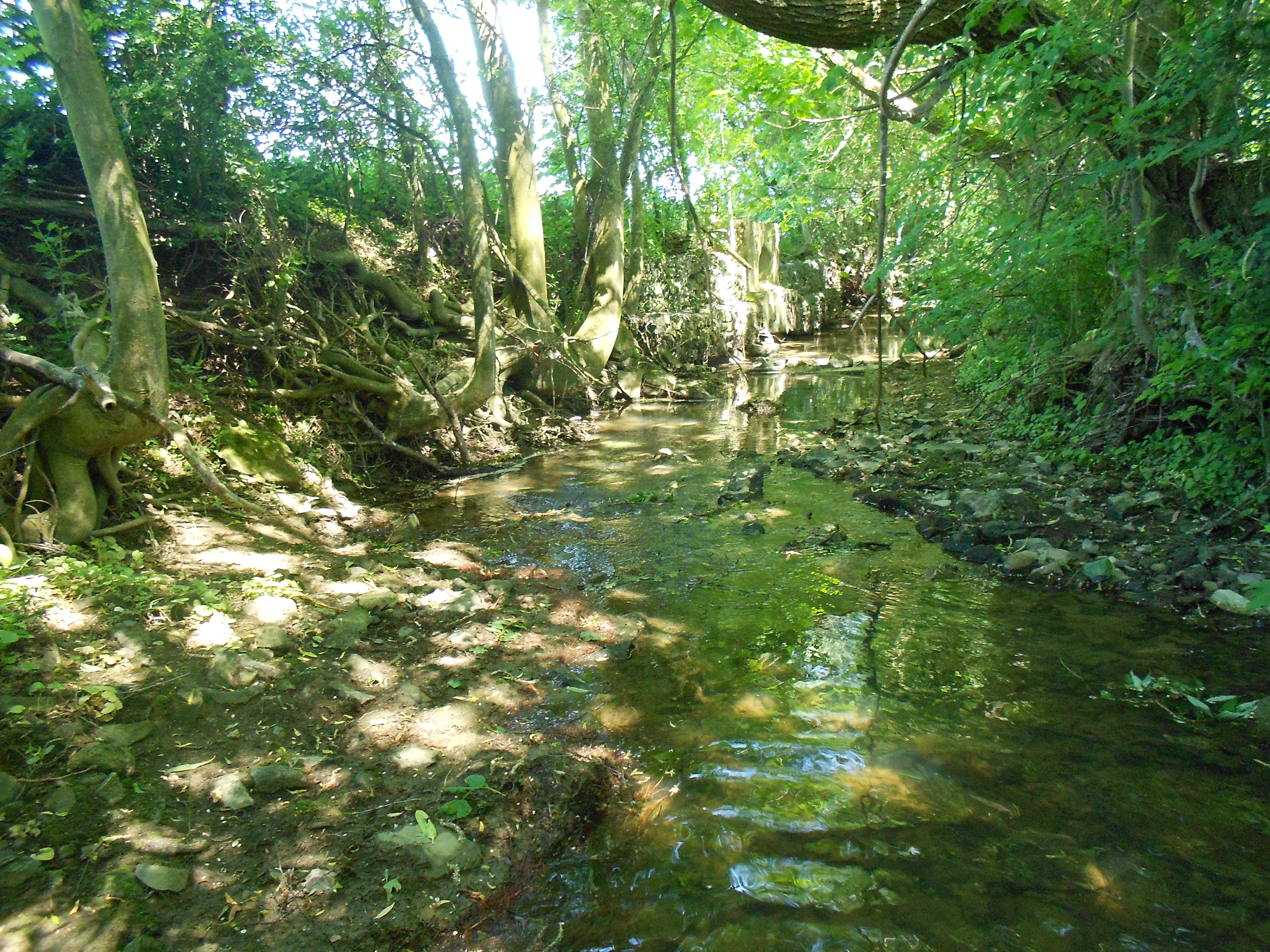
The local brook

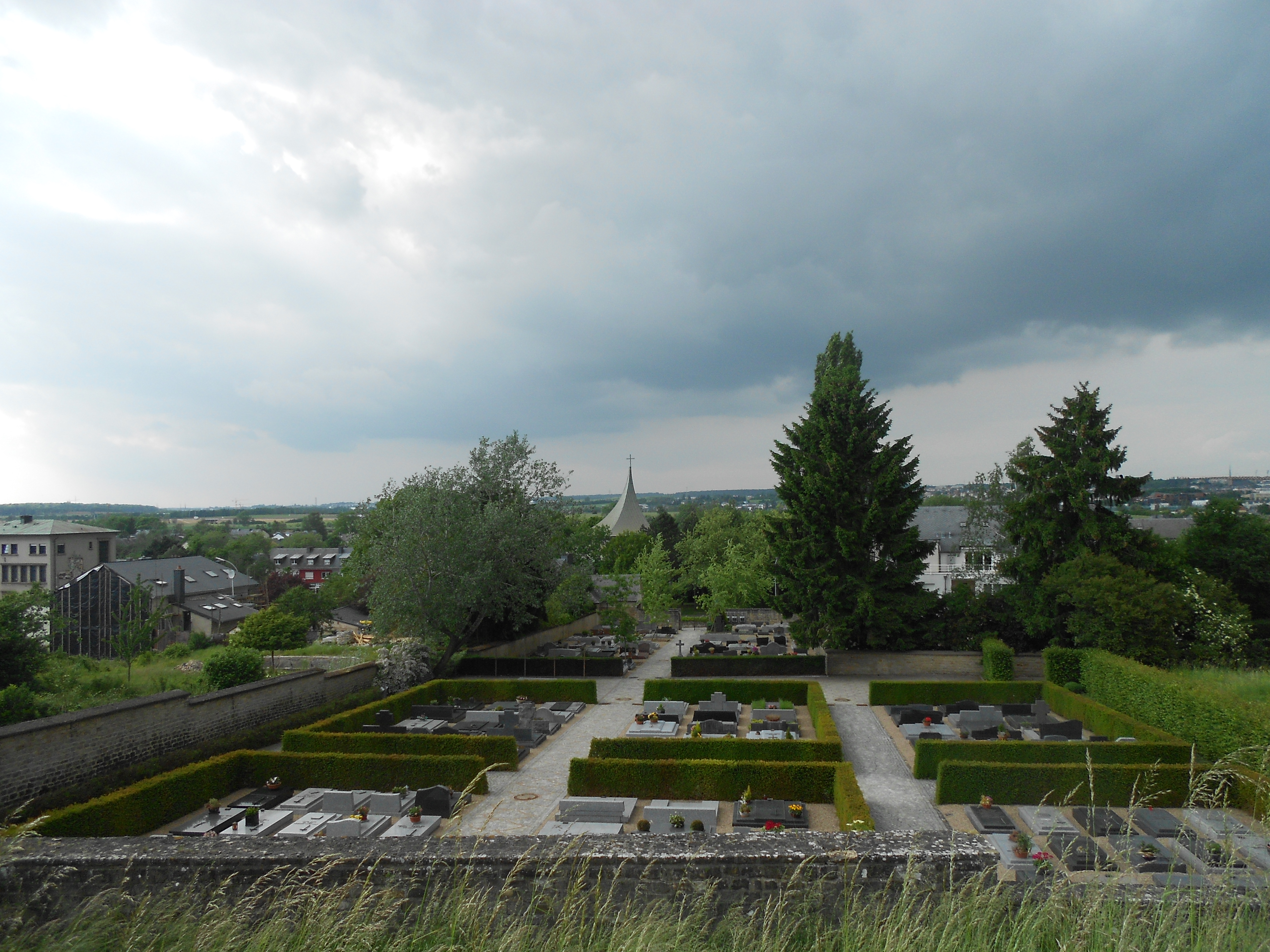
The cemetery
