= 2024–25 Rugby Europe International Championships =

- Date: 21 September 2024 – 24 May 2025
- Countries: 35

Tournament statistics
- Champions: Championship; Georgia (17); Trophy; Poland (2); Conference; Denmark (1); Ukraine (2); Moldova (3); Malta (5); Slovenia (2)
- Antim Cup: Georgia (19th title)
- Matches played: 68
- Attendance: 109,055 (1,604 per match)
- Tries scored: 565 (8.31 per match)

The 2024–25 Rugby Europe International Championships was the European Championship for tier 2 and tier 3 rugby union nations.

== Countries ==
Pre-tournament World Rugby rankings in parentheses.

Championship
Group A

- Georgia * (12)
- Netherlands (27)
- Spain (18)
- Switzerland ↑ (26)

Group B

- Belgium (30)
- Germany (31)
- Portugal (15)
- Romania (20)

Trophy

- Croatia (38)
- Czech Republic (34)
- Lithuania (50)
- Luxembourg ↑ (53)
- Poland ↓ (35)
- Sweden (32)

Conference
Pool A

- Denmark (77)
- Estonia (NR)
- Finland (75)
- Latvia * (57)
- Norway (106)

Pool D

- Andorra (87)
- Cyprus (NR)
- Israel (64)
- Malta * (45)

Pool B

- Austria (79)
- Hungary (70)
- Slovakia (NR)
- Ukraine ↓ (55)

Pool E

- Bosnia and Herzegovina (102)
- Kosovo ↑ (NR)
- Montenegro ↑ (NR)
- Slovenia (83)

Pool C

- Bulgaria (63)
- Moldova * (60)
- Serbia (82)
- Turkey (88)

Legend:
* Champion of 2023–24 season; ↑ Promoted from lower division during 2023–24 season; • Division Champion but not promoted during 2023–24 season; ‡ Last place inside own division but not relegated during 2023–24; ↓ Relegated from higher division during 2023–24 season

== 2025 Rugby Europe Championship ==
=== Pool A ===
Pos	Team	Pld	W	D	L	PF	PA	PD	TF	TA	TB	LB	Pts	Qualification
1	Georgia	3	3	0	0	212	39	+173	32	5	3	0	15	Grand Finals Semi-finals
2	Spain	3	2	0	1	128	99	+29	18	14	3	0	11	Grand Finals Semi-finals
3	Netherlands	3	1	0	2	104	93	+11	17	13	1	0	5	Ranking Finals Semi-finals
4	Switzerland	3	0	0	3	13	226	−213	1	36	0	0	0	Ranking Finals Semi-finals

Source: Rugby Europe
Rules for classification:
If two teams have the same number of points the best ranked will be: 1) match points in the games played between the tied Unions; 2) tries in the games played between the tied Unions; 3) match points difference in all pool games; 4) tries for in all pool games; 5) match points for in all pool games.
If three or more teams have same number of points, the best ranked will be: 1) match points difference in all pool games; 2) tries for in all pool games; 4) match points for in all pool games.
Points were awarded to the teams as follows: Win – 4 points, Draw – 2 points, At least 3 more tries than opponent – 1 point, Loss within 7 points – 1 point

=== Pool B ===
Pos	Team	Pld	W	D	L	PF	PA	PD	TF	TA	TB	LB	Pts	Qualification
1	Portugal	3	3	0	0	130	50	+80	19	5	3	0	15	Grand Finals Semi-finals
2	Romania	3	2	0	1	85	58	+27	9	8	1	0	9	Grand Finals Semi-finals
3	Belgium	3	1	0	2	83	90	−7	10	12	1	0	5	Ranking Finals Semi-finals
4	Germany	3	0	0	3	43	143	−100	6	19	0	0	0	Ranking Finals Semi-finals

Source: Rugby Europe
Rules for classification:
If two teams have the same number of points the best ranked will be: 1) match points in the games played between the tied Unions; 2) tries in the games played between the tied Unions; 3) match points difference in all pool games; 4) tries difference for in all pool games; 5) match points for in all pool games.
If three or more teams have same number of points, the best ranked will be: 1) match points difference in all pool games; 2) tries for in all pool games; 4) match points for in all pool games.
Points were awarded to the teams as follows: Win – 4 points, Draw – 2 points, At least 3 more tries than opponent – 1 point, Loss within 7 points – 1 point

Matches
Group Stage

31 January 2025
19:00 EET (UTC+2)

(1 TBP) Romania	48–10	Germany
	Report

Arcul de Triumf Stadium, Bucharest
Attendance: 4,200
Referee: Franco Rosella (Italy)

1 February 2025
16:00 GET (UTC+4)

(1 TBP) Georgia	110–0	Switzerland
	Report

Avchala Stadium, Tbilisi
Attendance: 3,500
Referee: Luis Fernandez (Spain)

1 February 2025
19:30 WET (UTC+0)

(1 TBP) Portugal	40–30	Belgium
	Report

Estádio do Restelo, Lisbon
Attendance: 2,500
Referee: Shota Tevzadze (Georgia)

2 February 2025
12:45 CET (UTC+1)

(1 TBP) Spain	53–24	Netherlands
	Report

Estadio Nacional Complutense, Madrid
Attendance: 7,200
Referee: Sam Grove-White (Scotland)

8 February 2025
15:00 GET (UTC+4)

(1 TBP) Georgia	40–5	Netherlands
	Report

Avchala Stadium, Tbilisi
Attendance: 2,000
Referee: Benoit Rousselet (France)

8 February 2025
20:00 CET (UTC+1)

Belgium	14–31	Romania
	Report

Stade Charles Tondreau, Mons
Attendance: 5,400
Referee: Hollie Davidson (Scotland)

9 February 2025
14:00 CET (UTC+1)

Switzerland	13–43	Spain (1 TBP)
	Report

Stade Municipal, Yverdon-les-Bains
Attendance: 3,800
Referee: Nicolae Fratila (Romania)

9 February 2025
17:15 WET (UTC+0)

(1 TBP) Portugal	56–14	Germany
	Report

Estádio do Restelo, Lisbon
Attendance: 7,000
Referee: Keane Davison (Ireland)

15 February 2025
13:00 CET (UTC+1)

(1 TBP) Netherlands	73–0	Switzerland
	Report

NRCA Stadium, Amsterdam
Attendance: 2,500
Referee: Paulo Duarte (Portugal)

15 February 2025
17:00 EET (UTC+2)

Romania	6–34	Portugal (1 TBP)
	Report

Botoșani Municipal Stadium, Botoșani
Attendance: 3,000
Referee: Ludovic Cayre (France)

16 February 2025
12:45 CET (UTC+1)

Spain	32–62	Georgia (1 TBP)
	Report

Estadio Nacional Complutense, Madrid
Attendance: 6,000
Referee: Eoghan Cross (Ireland)

16 February 2025
15:30 CET (UTC+1)

Germany	19–39	Belgium
	Report

Auestadion, Kassel
Attendance: 5,500
Referee: Saba Abulashvili (Georgia)

Ranking Finals

=== Semi-Finals ===
1 March 2025
13:00 CET (UTC+1)

Netherlands	38–9	Germany
	Report

NRCA Stadium, Amsterdam
Attendance: 2,500
Referee: Shota Tevzadze (Georgia)

1 March 2025
20:00 CET (UTC+1)

Belgium	38–5	Switzerland
	Report

Stade du Pachy, Waterloo
Attendance: 1,500
Referee: Alex Frasson (Italy)

=== Seventh Place Final ===
15 March 2025
15:45 CET (UTC+1)

Germany	17–20	Switzerland
	Report

Fritz-Grunebaum-Sportpark, Heidelberg
Attendance: 1,200
Referee: Mike English (Wales)

=== Fifth Place Final ===
15 March 2025
13:00 CET (UTC+1)

Netherlands	10–31	Belgium
	Report

NRCA Stadium, Amsterdam
Attendance: 4,500
Referee: Jeremy Rozier (France)

Grand Finals

=== Semi-Finals ===
1 March 2025
15:30 WET (UTC+0)

Portugal	31–42	Spain
	Report

Estádio Nacional, Oeiras
Attendance: 6,500
Referee: Adam Jones (Wales)

2 March 2025
15:00 GET (UTC+4)

Georgia	43–5	Romania
	Report

Avchala Stadium, Tbilisi
Attendance: 2,975
Referee: Peter Martin (Ireland)

=== Bronze Final ===
16 March 2025
15:00 EET (UTC+2)

Portugal	7–21	Romania
	Report

Estádio Nacional, Oeiras
Attendance: 600
Referee: Saba Abulashvili (Georgia)

=== Cup Final ===
16 March 2025
16:00 GET (UTC+4)

Georgia	46–28	Spain
	Report

Mikheil Meskhi Stadium, Tbilisi
Attendance: 14,900
Referee: Federico Vedovelli (Italy)

== 2024–25 Rugby Europe Trophy ==
Champions
Relegated to Rugby Europe Conference

Pos	Team	Pld	W	D	L	PF	PA	PD	TF	TA	TB	LB	Pts
1	Poland	5	5	0	0	182	90	+92	23	14	2	0	22
2	Sweden	5	4	0	1	192	113	+79	26	16	2	1	19
3	Czech Republic	5	3	0	2	164	89	+75	20	9	2	2	16
4	Croatia	5	1	1	3	147	203	−56	22	27	0	0	6
5	Lithuania	5	1	0	4	105	182	−77	13	25	1	0	5
6	Luxembourg	5	0	1	4	95	208	−113	11	26	0	0	2

Source: Rugby Europe
Rules for classification:
If two teams have the same number of points the best ranked will be: 1) match points in the games played between the tied Unions; 2) tries in the games played between the tied Unions; 3) match points difference in all pool games; 4) tries difference for in all pool games; 5) match points for in all pool games.
If three or more teams have same number of points, the best ranked will be: 1) match points difference in all pool games; 2) tries for in all pool games; 4) match points for in all pool games.
Points were awarded to the teams as follows: Win – 4 points, Draw – 2 points, At least 3 more tries than opponent – 1 point, Loss within 7 points – 1 point

Matches

26 October 2024
14:00 EEST (UTC+2)

(1 TBP) Lithuania	47–20	Luxembourg
	Repjrt

Siauliai Rugby Academy Stadium, Šiauliai
Attendance: n/a
Referee: Adrian Pawlik (Poland)

26 October 2024
14:00 CEST (UTC+2)

Sweden	22–16	Czech Republic (1 LBP)
	Report

Trelleborg Rugby Arena, Trelleborg
Attendance: 600
Referee: Andrei Gheorghe (Romania)

2 November 2024
14:00 EET (UTC+2)

Lithuania	19–46	Sweden (1 TBP)
	Report

Aukštaitija Stadium, Panevėžys
Attendance: 300
Referee: Francisco Serra (Portugal)

9 November 2024
14:00 CET (UTC +1)

Czech Republic	49–26	Croatia
	Report

Markéta Stadium, Prague
Attendance: 500
Referee: Adele Robert (Belgium)

16 November 2024
14:00 CET (UTC +1)

Croatia	31–42	Sweden
	Report

Stadion Lučko, Zagreb
Attendance: 300
Referee: Maria Latos (Germany)

16 November 2024
16:00 CET (UTC +1)

(1 TBP) Poland	40–13	Lithuania
	Report

Narodowy Stadion Rugby, Gdynia
Attendance: 1,500
Referee: Edwin Van Der Spek (Netherlands)

23 November 2024
14:00 CET (UTC +1)

Croatia	32–23	Lithuania
	Report

Stadion Lučko, Zagreb
Attendance: 200
Referee: Eugeniu Procopi (Moldova)

23 November 2024
20:15 CET (UTC +1)

(1 LBP) Czech Republic	15–22	Poland
	Report

Markéta Stadium, Prague
Attendance: 200
Referee: Papuna Chiqaberidze (Georgia)

30 November 2024
18:00 CET (UTC+1)

Luxembourg	31–31	Croatia
	Report

Stade de Luxembourg, Luxembourg
Attendance: 1,000
Referee: Phila Bitterhout (Netherlands)

22 February 2025
16:00 CET (UTC +1)

(1 TBP) Poland	58–27	Croatia
	Report

Narodowy Stadion Rugby, Gdynia
Attendance: 1,500
Referee: Inigo Atorrasagasti (Spain)

8 March 2025
14:00 CET (UTC +1)

(1 TBP) Czech Republic	40–16	Luxembourg
	Report

Markéta Stadium, Prague
Attendance: 300
Referee: Diogo Miranda (Portugal)

29 March 2025
14:00 EET (UTC+2)

Lithuania	3–44	Czech Republic (1 TBP)
	Report

Siauliai Rugby Academy Stadium, Šiauliai
Attendance: 500
Referee: Ethan Glass (Switzerland)

29 March 2025
18:00 CET (UTC+1)

Luxembourg	18–57	Sweden (1 TBP)
	Report

Stade de Luxembourg, Luxembourg
Attendance: 1,100
Referee: Saba Makharadze (Georgia)

5 April 2025
18:00 CEST (UTC+1)

Luxembourg	10–33	Poland
	Report

Stade de Luxembourg, Luxembourg
Attendance: 900
Referee: Eki Fanlo (Spain)

12 April 2025
15:00 CEST (UTC+1)

(1 LBP) Sweden	25–29	Poland
	Report

Trelleborg Rugby Arena, Trelleborg
Attendance: 850
Referee: Nicolae Fratila (Romania)

== 2024–25 Rugby Europe Conference ==
=== Pool A ===
Champions

Pos	Team	Pld	W	D	L	PF	PA	PD	TF	TA	TB	LB	Pts	Promotion
1	Denmark	4	4	0	0	192	16	+176	28	1	3	0	19	Advanced to Promotion play-off
2	Finland	4	3	0	1	221	76	+145	39	10	2	0	14	
3	Latvia	4	2	0	2	127	52	+75	20	6	1	2	11	
4	Norway	4	1	0	3	93	159	−66	15	25	1	0	5	
5	Estonia	4	0	0	4	15	345	−330	3	55	0	0	0	

Source: Rugby Europe
Rules for classification:
If two teams have the same number of points the best ranked will be: 1) match points in the games played between the tied Unions; 2) tries in the games played between the tied Unions; 3) match points difference in all pool games; 4) tries difference for in all pool games; 5) match points for in all pool games.
If three or more teams have same number of points, the best ranked will be: 1) match points difference in all pool games; 2) tries for in all pool games; 4) match points for in all pool games.
Points were awarded to the teams as follows: Win – 4 points, Draw – 2 points, At least 3 more tries than opponent – 1 point, Loss within 7 points – 1 point

Matches

5 October 2024
15:00 CEST (UTC+2)

(1 TBP) Denmark	42–0	Finland
	Report

Erritsø Rugby Club, Fredericia
Attendance: 600
Referee: Joshua Jahn (Germany)

12 October 2024
14:00 EEST (UTC+3)

Estonia	0–105	Denmark (1 TBP)
	Report

Estonian National Cricket and Rugby field, Tallinn
Attendance: 150
Referee: : Romain Rouzairol (Norway)

19 October 2024
15:00 EEST (UTC+3)

(1 TBP) Finland	81–10	Norway
	Report

Hakunila Sports Park, Vantaa
Attendance: 250
Referee: Vlad Ilnitskyi (Ukraine)

26 October 2024
14:00 CEST (UTC+2)

Norway	19–36	Latvia
	Report

Leikvang Stadium, Bergen
Attendance: 150
Referee: Eki Fanlo (Spain)

2 November 2024
14:00 EET (UTC+2)

(1 TBP) Latvia	62–0	Estonia
	Report

Baldones stations, Baldone
Attendance: 150
Referee: Victor Lungu (Moldova)

19 April 2025
15:00 CEST (UTC+2)

Denmark	13–10	Latvia (1 LBP)
	Report

Erritsø Rugby Club, Fredericia
Attendance: 500
Referee: Diogo Inacio (Portugal)

26 April 2025
15:00 EEST (UTC+3)

(1 LBP) Latvia	19–20	Finland
	Report

Baldone Stadium. Baldone
Attendance: 150
Referee: Nikola Zachariev (Czech Republic)

3 May 2025
14:30 EEST (UTC+03)

Estonia	10–58	Norway (1 TBP)
	Report

Estonian National Cricket and Rugby field, Tallinn
Attendance: 100
Referee: Nathanael Legras (Belgium)

10 May 2025
12:00 EEST (UTC+03)

Estonia	5–120	Finland (1 TBP)
	Report

Kalevi Keskstaadion, Tallinn
Attendance: 100
Referee: Thomas Semin (Monaco)

10 May 2025
14:30 CEST (UTC+2)

Norway	6–32	Denmark (1 TBP)
	Report

Voldsløkka Stadion, Oslo
Attendance: 100
Referee: Samuel Grando (Switzerland)

=== Pool B ===
Champions

Pos	Team	Pld	W	D	L	PF	PA	PD	TF	TA	TB	LB	Pts
1	Ukraine	2	2	0	0	221	23	+198	34	2	2	0	10
2	Austria	2	2	0	0	156	15	+141	22	2	2	0	10
3	Hungary	3	1	0	2	73	141	−68	11	19	1	0	5
4	Slovakia	3	0	0	3	32	303	−271	2	46	0	0	0

Source: Rugby Europe
Rules for classification:
If two teams have the same number of points the best ranked will be: 1) match points in the games played between the tied Unions; 2) tries in the games played between the tied Unions; 3) match points difference in all pool games; 4) tries difference for in all pool games; 5) match points for in all pool games.
If three or more teams have same number of points, the best ranked will be: 1) match points difference in all pool games; 2) tries for in all pool games; 4) match points for in all pool games.
Points were awarded to the teams as follows: Win – 4 points, Draw – 2 points, At least 3 more tries than opponent – 1 point, Loss within 7 points – 1 point

Matches

21 September 2024
15:00 CEST (UTC+2)

Hungary	12–39	Austria (1 TBP)
	Report

Széktói Stadion, Kecskemét
Attendance: 200
Referee: Andrei Ballok (Romania)

26 October 2024
14:00 CEST (UTC+2)

Slovakia	16–51	Hungary (1 TBP)
	Report

Štadion PFK Piešťany, Piešťany
Attendance: 300
Referee: Paul Warman (Germany)

9 November 2024
14:00 CET (UTC+2)

(1 TBP) Ukraine	135–13	Slovakia
	Report

Štadion PFK Piešťany, Piešťany
Attendance: 200
Referee: Philip Manolopoulos (Austria)

12 April 2025
15:00 CEST (UTC+2)

Hungary	10–86	Ukraine (1 TBP)
	Report

Budapest Rugby Center, Budapest
Attendance: 500
Referee: Pedro Mendes Silva (Portugal)

26 April 2025
17:00 CEST (UTC+1)

Ukraine	Cancelled	Austria
	n/a

Narodowy Stadion Rugby, Gdynia
Attendance: n/a
Referee: n/a

3 May 2025
14:00 CEST (UTC+2)

(1 TBP) Austria	117–3	Slovakia
	Report

Sepp Doll Stadium, Krems an der Donau
Attendance: 630
Referee: Diogo Grippa (Belgium)

=== Pool C ===
Champions

Pos	Team	Pld	W	D	L	PF	PA	PD	TF	TA	TB	LB	Pts	Promotion
1	Moldova	3	2	0	1	91	34	+57	15	4	2	1	11	Advanced to Promotion play-off
2	Serbia	3	2	0	1	75	71	+4	10	10	1	0	9	
3	Turkey	3	1	0	2	74	81	−7	9	12	1	0	5	
4	Bulgaria	3	1	0	2	56	110	−54	7	15	0	0	4	

Source: Rugby Europe
Rules for classification:
If two teams have the same number of points the best ranked will be: 1) match points in the games played between the tied Unions; 2) tries in the games played between the tied Unions; 3) match points difference in all pool games; 4) tries difference for in all pool games; 5) match points for in all pool games.
If three or more teams have same number of points, the best ranked will be: 1) match points difference in all pool games; 2) tries for in all pool games; 4) match points for in all pool games.
Points were awarded to the teams as follows: Win – 4 points, Draw – 2 points, At least 3 more tries than opponent – 1 point, Loss within 7 points – 1 point

Matches

28 September 2024
12:00 EEST (UTC+3)

(1 TBP) Moldova	43–13	Turkey
	Report

Dinamo stadium, Chișinău
Attendance: 600
Referee: Emmanuel Jacques (Denmark)

5 October 2024
14:00 CEST (UTC+2)

Serbia	3–31	Moldova (1 TBP)
	Report

Stadium FK Zeleznik, Belgrade
Attendance: 100
Referee: Vaidotas Girdvainis (Lithuania)

5 October 2024
15:00 TRT UTC+3)

(1 TBP) Turkey	49–10	Bulgaria
	Report

Kızılcahamam İlçe Stadyumu, Ankara
Attendance: 300
Referee: Shota Tsagareishvili (Georgia)

12 April 2025
14:00 TRT UTC+3)

Turkey	12–28	Serbia
	Report

Eyüp Stadium, Istanbul
Attendance: 300
Referee: Inaki Munoz Martin (Spain)

18 April 2025
18:00 EEST (UTC+3)

Bulgaria	18–17	Moldova (1 LBP)
	Report

Vasil Levski National Stadium, Sofia
Attendance: 2,000
Referee: Francisco Serra (Portugal)

10 May 2025
14:00 CEST (UTC+2)

(1 TBP) Serbia	44–28	Bulgaria
	Report

Wiselj Park Stadium, Borča
Attendance: 700
Referee: Joshua Jahn (Germany)

=== Pool D ===
Champions

Pos	Team	Pld	W	D	L	PF	PA	PD	TF	TA	TB	LB	Pts
1	Malta	3	2	0	1	68	40	+28	9	4	1	1	10
2	Andorra	3	2	0	1	62	57	+5	9	7	0	1	9
3	Israel	2	1	0	1	44	46	−2	5	7	0	1	5
4	Cyprus	2	0	0	2	40	71	−31	6	9	0	0	0

Source: Rugby Europe
Rules for classification:
If two teams have the same number of points the best ranked will be: 1) match points in the games played between the tied Unions; 2) tries in the games played between the tied Unions; 3) match points difference in all pool games; 4) tries difference for in all pool games; 5) match points for in all pool games.
If three or more teams have same number of points, the best ranked will be: 1) match points difference in all pool games; 2) tries for in all pool games; 4) match points for in all pool games.
Points were awarded to the teams as follows: Win – 4 points, Draw – 2 points, At least 3 more tries than opponent – 1 point, Loss within 7 points – 1 point

Matches

5 October 2024
14:00 CEST (UTC+2)

(1 TBP) Malta	43–21	Cyprus
	Report

Tony Bezzina Stadium, Paola
Attendance: 1,000
Referee: Diogo Inacio (Portugal)

30 November 2024
17:00 CET (UTC +1)

(1 LBP) Andorra	3–10	Malta
	Report

Estadi Nacional, Andorra la Vella
Attendance: 800
Referee: Anatolie Tipa (Moldova)

1 February 2025
16:00 CET (UTC +1)

Andorra	31–28	Israel (1 LBP)
	Report

Estadi Nacional, Andorra la Vella
Referee: Liam Wright (Netherlands)

5 April 2025
14:00 EEST (UTC+3)

Cyprus	19–28	Andorra
	Report

Tsirio Stadium, Limassol
Attendance: 500
Referee: Dominik Jastrzebski (Poland)

5 April 2025
14:00 CEST (UTC+2)

(1 LBP) Malta	15–16	Israel
	Report

Tony Bezzina Stadium, Paola
Attendance: 550
Referee: Alfonso Mirat-Servan (Spain)

26 April 2025
14:00 EEST (UTC+3)

Israel	Сancelled	Cyprus
	n/a

n/a, Cyprus
Attendance: n/a
Referee: n/a

=== Pool E ===
Champions

Pos	Team	Pld	W	D	L	PF	PA	PD	TF	TA	TB	LB	Pts
1	Slovenia	3	3	0	0	147	53	+94	15	7	1	0	13
2	Bosnia and Herzegovina	3	2	0	1	128	64	+64	20	10	1	0	9
3	Montenegro	3	1	0	2	97	79	+18	15	10	1	0	5
4	Kosovo	3	0	0	3	30	206	−176	4	33	0	0	0

Source: Rugby Europe
Rules for classification:
If two teams have the same number of points the best ranked will be: 1) match points in the games played between the tied Unions; 2) tries in the games played between the tied Unions; 3) match points difference in all pool games; 4) tries difference for in all pool games; 5) match points for in all pool games.
If three or more teams have same number of points, the best ranked will be: 1) match points difference in all pool games; 2) tries for in all pool games; 4) match points for in all pool games.
Points were awarded to the teams as follows: Win – 4 points, Draw – 2 points, At least 3 more tries than opponent – 1 point, Loss within 7 points – 1 point

Matches

29 September 2024
13:00 CEST (UTC+2)

Kosovo	10–55	Montenegro (1 TBP)
	Report

Demush Mavraj Stadium, Istog
Attendance: 100
Referee: Vadims Galajevs (Latvia)

5 October 2024
13:00 CEST (UTC+2)

Bosnia and Herzegovina	30–20	Montenegro
	Report

Kamberovica Polje Stadium, Zenica
Attendance: 100
Referee: Ivan Zelic (Croatia)

12 October 2024
13:45 CEST (UTC+2)

(1 TBP) Slovenia	74–10	Kosovo
	Report

Oval Stadium, Ljubljana
Attendance: 100
Referee: Samuel Grando (Switzerland)

5 April 2025
14:00 CEST (UTC+2)

(1 TBP) Bosnia and Herzegovina	77–10	Kosovo
	Report

Kamberovica Polje Stadium, Zenica
Attendance: 200
Referee: Sébastien Diuritch (Switzerland)

19 April 2025
12:00 CEST (UTC+3)

Montenegro	22–39	Slovenia
	Report

Gradski stadion (Auxiliary Field), Nikšić
Attendance: 200
Referee: Borys Bovsunovskyi (Ukraine)

26 April 2025
13:45 CEST (UTC+2)

Slovenia	34–21	Bosnia and Herzegovina
	Report

Oval Stadium, Ljubljana
Attendance: 150
Referee: Valeriu Chipercean (Moldova)

== Play-off ==
=== Conference promotion to Trophy play-off ===
24 May 2025
15:00 CEST (UTC+2)

Denmark	41–6	Moldova
	Report

CSR-Nanok Rugby Club Stadium, Copenhagen
Attendance: 450
Referee: Eki Fanlo (Spain)
