= 2022–23 Rugby Europe International Championships =

- Date: 1 October 2022 – 27 May 2023
- Countries: 31

Tournament statistics
- Champions: Championship; Georgia (15); Trophy; Switzerland (1); Conference 1 Czech Republic (3); Israel (1); Conference 2 Finland (1); Serbia (1); Development; Austria (1)
- Antim Cup: Georgia (16th title)
- Matches played: 57
- Attendance: 81,889 (1,437 per match)
- Tries scored: 408 (7.16 per match)

The 2022–23 Rugby Europe International Championships was the European Championship for tier 2 and tier 3 rugby union nations. The 2022–23 season was the first of its new format and structure.

On February 28, 2022, Russia and Belarus were suspended from all international rugby and cross-border club rugby activities until further notice.

== Countries ==
Pre-tournament World Rugby rankings in parentheses.

Championship
Pool A

- Georgia * (13)
- Germany ↑ (30)
- Netherlands (28)
- Spain (15)

Trophy

- Croatia ↑ (39)
- Lithuania (48)
- Switzerland (34)
- Sweden ↑ (37)
- Ukraine (35)

Pool B

- Belgium ↑ (26)
- Poland ↑ (29)
- Portugal (20)
- Romania (17)

Conference 1
North

- Czech Republic (36)
- Hungary (64)
- Latvia (63)
- Luxembourg (61)
- Moldova ↑ (56)

Conference 2
North

- Andorra (86)
- Denmark (71)
- Finland (83)
- Norway (100)

Development

- Austria ↓ (87)
- Kosovo (NR)

South

- Bulgaria ↑ (66)
- Cyprus (NR)
- Israel (59)
- Malta (41)
- Slovenia (76)

South

- Bosnia and Herzegovina (89)
- Montenegro ↑ (NR)
- Serbia (79)
- Turkey (NR)

Legend:
* Champion of 2021–22 season; ↑ Promoted from lower division during 2021–22 season; • Division Champion but not promoted during 2021–22 season; ‡ Last place inside own division but not relegated during 2021–22; ↓ Relegated from higher division during 2021–22 season

== 2023 Rugby Europe Championship ==
=== Pool A ===
Advances to the Grand Finals Semi-Finals
Advances to the Ranking Finals Semi-Finals

Pos.	Team	Games				Points			Tries			TBP	LBP	Table points
Pos.	Team	Played	Won	Drawn	Lost	For	Against	Diff	For	Against	Diff	TBP	LBP	Table points
1	Georgia	3	3	0	0	156	23	+133	24	3	+21	3	0	15
2	Spain	3	2	0	1	63	75	-12	8	10	-2	1	0	9
3	Netherlands	3	1	0	2	61	97	-36	6	12	-6	0	0	4
4	Germany	3	0	0	3	55	140	-85	6	19	-13	0	1	1
Source - Points were awarded to the teams as follows: Win – 4 points | Draw – 2 points | At least 3 more tries than opponent – 1 point | Loss within 7 points – 1 point

=== Pool B ===
Advances to the Grand Finals Semi-Finals
Advances to the Ranking Finals Semi-Finals

Pos.	Team	Games				Points			Tries			TBP	LBP	Table points
Pos.	Team	Played	Won	Drawn	Lost	For	Against	Diff	For	Against	Diff	TBP	LBP	Table points
1	Portugal	3	3	0	0	157	40	+117	24	4	+20	3	0	15
2	Romania	3	2	0	1	143	70	+73	21	9	+12	2	0	10
3	Poland	3	1	0	2	51	147	-96	5	24	-19	0	0	4
4	Belgium	3	0	0	3	37	131	-94	5	18	-13	0	1	1
Source - Points were awarded to the teams as follows: Win – 4 points | Draw – 2 points | At least 3 more tries than opponent – 1 point | Loss within 7 points – 1 point

Matches
Group Stage

4 February 2023
14:00 EET (UTC+2)

(1 TBP) Romania	67–27	Poland
	Report

Arcul de Triumf Stadium, Bucharest
Attendance: 2,136
Referee: Saba Abulashvili (Georgia)

4 February 2023
19:00 WET (UTC+0)

(1 TBP) Portugal	54–17	Belgium
	Report

Estádio Nacional, Oeiras
Attendance: 3,723
Referee: Hollie Davidson (Scotland)

5 February 2023
13:00 GET (UTC+4)

(1 TBP) Georgia	75–12	Germany
	Report

Achvala Stadium, Tbilisi
Attendance: 2,960
Referee: Cristian Şerban (Romania)

5 February 2023
12:45 CET (UTC+1)

Spain	28–20	Netherlands
	Report

Estadio Nacional Complutense, Madrid
Attendance: 4,500
Referee: Paulo Duarte (Portugal)

11 February 2023
11:35 CET (UTC+1)

Poland	3–65	Portugal (1 TBP)
	Report

Narodowy Stadion Rugby, Gdynia
Attendance: 2,000
Referee: Andrew Cole (Ireland)

11 February 2023
13:15 CET (UTC+1)

Netherlands	8–40	Georgia (1 TBP)
	Report

NRCA Stadium, Amsterdam
Attendance: 2,500
Referee: Ludovic Cayre (France)

11 February 2023
18:30 CET (UTC+1)

Belgium	5–56	Romania (1 TBP)
	Report

Sportscentrum Nelson Mandela, Brussels
Attendance: 2,100
Referee: Mike English (Wales)

12 February 2023
14:30 CET (UTC+1)

Germany	14–32	Spain (1 TBP)
	Report

Fritz Grunebaum Sportpark, Heidelberg
Attendance: 2,500
Referee: Clara Munarini (Italy)

18 February 2023
13:15 CET (UTC+1)

(1 LBP) Germany	29–33	Netherlands
	Report

Stadion Pichterich, Neckarsulm
Attendance: 1,350
Referee: Alexandru Ionescu (Romania)

18 February 2023
19:00 CET (UTC+1)

Spain	3–41	Georgia (1 TBP)
	Report

Campos del Malecón, Torrelavega
Attendance: 4,500
Referee: Eoghan Cross (Ireland)

18 February 2023
21:15 CET (UTC+1)

Poland	21–15	Belgium (1 LBP)
	Report

Narodowy Stadion Rugby, Gdynia
Attendance: 2,000
Referee: Inigo Atorrasagasti (Spain)

19 February 2023
15:00 WET (UTC+0)

(1 TBP) Portugal	38–20	Romania
	Report

Estádio do Restelo, Lisbon
Attendance: 4,200
Referee: Saba Abulashvili (Georgia)

Ranking Finals

=== Semi-Finals ===
4 March 2023
12:15 CET (UTC+1)

Netherlands	31–19	Belgium
	Report

NRCA Stadium, Amsterdam
Attendance: 1,250
Referee: Michael Todd (Scotland)

5 March 2023
20:00 CET (UTC+1)

Poland	18–23	Germany
	Report

Narodowy Stadion, Gdynia
Attendance: 1,200
Referee: Gert Visser (Netherlands)

=== Seventh Place Final ===
19 March 2023
12:30 CET (UTC+1)

Belgium	18–17	Poland
	Report

NRCA Stadium, Amsterdam
Attendance: 2,000
Referee: Cristian Şerban (Romania)

=== Fifth Place Final ===
19 March 2023
15:00 CET (UTC+1)

Netherlands	50–28	Germany
	Report

NRCA Stadium, Amsterdam
Attendance: 2,750
Referee: Shota Tevzadze (Georgia)

Grand Finals

=== Semi-Finals ===
4 March 2023
17:00 WET (UTC+0)

Portugal	27–10	Spain
	Report

Estádio do Restelo, Lisbon
Attendance: 5,000
Referee: Thomas Charabas (France)

5 March 2023
16:00 GET (UTC+4)

Georgia	31–7	Romania
	Report

Achvala Stadium, Tbilisi
Attendance: 2,600
Referee: Federico Vedovelli (Italy)

=== Bronze Final ===
19 March 2023
17:15 CET (UTC+1)

Romania	31–25	Spain
	Report

Estadio Nuevo Vivero, Badajoz
Attendance: 5,300
Referee: Chris Busby (Ireland)

=== Cup Final ===
19 March 2023
20:00 CET (UTC+1)

Georgia	38–11	Portugal
	Report

Estadio Nuevo Vivero, Badajoz
Attendance: 6,000
Referee: Ludovic Cayre (France)

== 2022–23 Rugby Europe Trophy ==
Champions

Place	Nation	Games				Points			Tries			TBP	LBP	Table points
Place	Nation	Played	Won	Drawn	Lost	For	Against	Diff	For	Against	Diff	TBP	LBP	Table points
1	Switzerland	4	4	0	0	205	72	+133	29	8	+21	3	0	19
2	Ukraine	4	2	0	2	117	135	-18	15	20	-5	1	0	9
3	Sweden	4	2	0	2	82	139	-57	11	19	-8	1	0	9
4	Lithuania	4	1	0	3	97	122	-25	13	15	-2	1	2	7
5	Croatia	4	1	0	3	100	133	-33	12	18	-4	0	1	5
Source - Points were awarded to the teams as follows: Win – 4 points | Draw – 2 points | At least 3 more tries than opponent – 1 point | Loss within 7 points – 1 point | Completing a Grand Slam – 1 point

Matches

22 October 2022
14:15 CEST (UTC +2)

(1 LBP) Croatia	22–27	Ukraine
	Report

Stadion NŠC Stjepan Spajić, Zagreb
Attendance: 650
Referee: Pedro Mendes-Silva (Portugal)

29 October 2022
14:00 CEST (UTC +2)

(1TBP) Sweden	37–17	Croatia
	Report

Olympiastadion, Stockholm
Attendance: 1,500
Referee: Eugeniu Procopi (Moldova)

5 November 2022
14:00 EET (UTC+2)

(1 TBP) Lithuania	39–20	Ukraine
	Report

Šiauliai Rugby Academy Stadium, Šiauliai
Attendance: 700
Referee: Sulkhan Chikladze (Georgia)

5 November 2022
14:00 CET (UTC +1)

Sweden	12–69	Switzerland (1 TBP)
	Report

Malmö Stadion, Malmö
Attendance: 200
Referee: Ignacio Munoz-Martin (Spain)

12 November 2022
15:00 CET (UTC +1)

(1 TBP) Switzerland	45–6	Lithuania
	Report

Stade Juan Antonio Samaranch, Lausanne
Attendance: 650
Referee: John Catteau (Belgium)

11 March 2023
14:00 CET (UTC +1)

Ukraine	32–59	Switzerland (1 TBP)
	Report

Stadion NŠC Stjepan Spajić, Zagreb
Attendance: 150
Referee: Anthony Lac (Monaco)

18 March 2023
15:30 CET (UTC +1)

(1 TBP) Ukraine	38–15	Sweden
	Report

Stari plac, Split
Attendance: 250
Referee: Kevin Sulejmani (Belgium)

25 March 2023
14:00 EET (UTC +2)

(1 LBP) Lithuania	37–39	Croatia
	Report

Šiauliai Rugby Academy Stadium, Šiauliai
Attendance: 600
Referee: Ignacio Munoz-Martin (Spain)

1 April 2023
14:00 EEST (UTC +3)

(1 LBP) Lithuania	15–18 (Note: Fixture reversed due to the Swedish RFU having no stadium available)	Sweden
	Report

Regbio stadionas, Šiauliai
Attendance: n/a
Referee: Lukasz Jasinski (Poland)

1 April 2023
16:00 CEST (UTC +2)

Croatia	22–32	Switzerland
	Report

Gradski sportski centar, Makarska
Attendance: 3,000
Referee: Killian O'Brien (Germany)

== 2022–23 Rugby Europe Conference ==
=== Conference 1 ===
==== Conference 1 North ====
Champions and advances to Promotion play-off

Place	Nation	Games				Points			TBP	LBP	Table points
Place	Nation	Played	Won	Drawn	Lost	For	Against	Diff	TBP	LBP	Table points
1	Czech Republic	4	4	0	0	151	41	+110	4	0	20
2	Luxembourg	4	2	0	2	56	56	0	2	0	10
3	Moldova	4	2	0	2	69	67	+2	2	0	10
4	Latvia	4	2	0	2	57	92	-35	1	0	9
5	Hungary	4	0	0	4	42	119	-77	0	1	1
Source - Points were awarded to the teams as follows: Win – 4 points | Draw – 2 points | At least 3 more tries than opponent – 1 point | Loss within 7 points – 1 point | Completing a Grand Slam – 1 point

Matches

8 October 2022
15:00 CEST (UTC+2)

Hungary	21–41	Czech Republic (1 TBP)
	Report

Rugby Center at Kincsem Park, Budapest
Attendance: 200
Referee: Mike Hawkins (Denmark)

22 October 2023
14:00 EEST (UTC+3)

(1 TBP) Latvia	28–0	Luxembourg
	n/a

Baldones stadions, Baldone
Attendance: n/a
Referee: n/a

29 October 2022
14:00 EEST (UTC+3)

(1 TBP) Moldova	28–0	Latvia
	n/a

Dinamo stadium, Chișinău
Attendance: n/a
Referee: n/a

12 November 2022
14:00 CET (UTC+1)

(1 TBP) Czech Republic	39–13	Moldova
	Report

Stadion Mládeže, Zlín
Attendance: 1,384
Referee: Maria Latos (Germany)

26 November 2022
n/a

(1 TBP) Luxembourg	28–0	Hungary
	n/a

n/a
Attendance: n/a
Referee: n/a

14 April 2023
20:30 CEST (UTC+2)

Luxembourg	28–0	Moldova
	n/a

n/a
Attendance: n/a
Referee: n/a

22 April 2023
14:00 CEST (UTC+2)

Czech Republic	28–0	Luxembourg
	n/a

Rugby Club Havirov Stadium, Havířov
Attendance: n/a
Referee: n/a

29 April 2023
13:00 EEST (UTC+3)

Latvia	7–43	Czech Republic (1 TBP)
	Report

Daugava stadium, Liepāja
Attendance: 500
Referee: Dominik Jastrzebski (Poland)

29 April 2023
n/a

(1 TBP) Moldova	28–0	Hungary
	n/a

n/a
Attendance: n/a
Referee: n/a

6 May 2023
16:00 CEST (UTC+2)

(1 LBP) Hungary	21–22	Latvia
	Report

Rugby Center at Kincsem Park, Budapest
Attendance: 400
Referee: Nikola Zachariev (Czech Republic)

==== Conference 1 South ====
Champions and advances to Promotion play-off

Place	Nation	Games				Points			TBP	LBP	Table points
Place	Nation	Played	Won	Drawn	Lost	For	Against	Diff	TBP	LBP	Table points
1	Israel	4	3	0	1	115	62	+53	2	0	14
2	Bulgaria	4	3	0	1	113	83	+30	1	0	13
3	Cyprus	4	2	0	2	146	87	+59	2	0	10
4	Malta	4	2	0	2	101	85	+16	2	0	10
5	Slovenia	4	0	0	4	43	101	-148	0	0	0
Source - Points were awarded to the teams as follows: Win – 4 points | Draw – 2 points | At least 3 more tries than opponent – 1 point | Loss within 7 points – 1 point | Completing a Grand Slam – 1 point

Matches

1 October 2022
14:00 CEST (UTC+2)

Slovenia	7–56	Cyprus (1 TBP)
	n/a

Oval Ljubljana, Ljubljana
Attendance: n/a
Referee: Dominik Jastrzebski (Poland)

15 October 2022
14:00 CEST (UTC+2)

Malta	14–23	Bulgaria
	Report

Hibernians Stadium, Paola
Attendance: 350
Referee: Lukasz Jazinski (Poland)

22 October 2022
14:00 CEST (UTC+2)

Slovenia	10–46	Malta (1 TBP)
	Report

Oval Ljubljana, Ljubljana
Attendance: 100
Referee: Kevin Suljemani (Belgium)

5 November 2022
15:00 EET (UTC+2)

Bulgaria	34–15	Israel
	Report

National Sports Academy Stadium, Sofia
Attendance: 4,000
Referee: Valeriu Chipercean (Romania)

12 November 2022
13:00 EET (UTC+2)

(1 LBP) Cyprus	21–22	Israel
	Report

Community Stadium, Maroni
Attendance: 200
Referee: Francisco Serra (Portugal)

25 March 2023
14:00 CET (UTC+1)

(1 TBP) Malta	41–24	Cyprus
	Report

Hibernians Stadium, Paola
Attendance: 1,300
Referee: Liam Wright (Netherlands)

15 April 2023
14:00 IDT (UTC+3)

(1 TBP) Israel	28–0	Malta
	n/a

Yizre'el Rugby Club, Yizre'el
Attendance: n/a
Referee: n/a

22 April 2023
14:00 IDT (UTC+3)

(1 TBP) Israel	50–7	Slovenia
	Report

Yizre'el Rugby Club, Yizre'el
Attendance: 500
Referee: Jonathan Teppler (Germany)

29 April 2023
15:00 CEST (UTC+2)

(1 TBP) Bulgaria	39–19	Slovenia
	Report

National Sports Academy Stadium, Sofia
Attendance: 1,110
Referee: Ivan Zelic (Croatia)

13 May 2023
14:00 EEST (UTC+3)

Cyprus	35–17	Bulgaria
	Report

Rugby field at Makareio, Nicosia
Referee: Luis Fernandez (Spain)

=== Conference 2 ===
==== Conference 2 North ====
Champions and promoted

Place	Nation	Games				Points			TBP	LBP	Table points
Place	Nation	Played	Won	Drawn	Lost	For	Against	Diff	TBP	LBP	Table points
1	Finland	3	3	0	0	84	32	+52	2	0	14
2	Denmark	3	2	0	1	53	51	+2	0	0	8
3	Andorra	3	1	0	2	69	62	+7	1	0	5
4	Norway	3	0	0	3	19	70	-51	0	0	0
Source - Points were awarded to the teams as follows: Win – 4 points | Draw – 2 points | At least 3 more tries than opponent – 1 point | Loss within 7 points – 1 point | Completing a Grand Slam – 1 point

Matches

1 October 2022
15:00 CEST (UTC+2)

Denmark	25–10	Andorra
	n/a

Rugby Club Speed Stadium, Copenhagen
Attendance: n/a
Referee: Rami Aro (Sweden)

15 October 2022
15:00 EEST (UTC+3)

(1 TBP) Finland	31–6	Denmark
	Report

Myllypuron urheilupuisto, Helsinki
Attendance: 300
Referee: Boris Bovsunovsky (Ukraine)

22 October 2022
14:00 EEST (UTC+3)

(1 TBP) Finland	22–3	Norway
	Report

Myllypuron urheilupuisto, Helsinki
Attendance: 350
Referee: Norbert Matrai (Hungary)

22 April 2023
17:00 CEST (UTC+2)

Andorra	23–31	Finland
	Report

Estadi Nacional, Andorra la Vella
Attendance: 1,000
Referee: Anatolie Tipa (Moldova)

29 April 2023
16:50 CEST (UTC+2)

(1 TBP) Andorra	26–6	Norway
	Report

Estadi Esportiu de Prada de Moles, Encamp
Attendance: 400
Referee: Sahar Zivan (Croatia)

13 May 2023
14:00 CEST (UTC+2)

Norway	10–22	Denmark
	Report

Stavanger Stadion, Stavanger
Attendance: 100
Referee: Edwin Van Der Spek (Netherlands)

==== Conference 2 South ====
Champions and promoted
Withdrawn

Place	Nation	Games				Points			TBP	LBP	Table points
Place	Nation	Played	Won	Drawn	Lost	For	Against	Diff	TBP	LBP	Table points
1	Serbia	3	3	0	0	125	18	+107	3	0	15
2	Bosnia and Herzegovina	3	2	0	1	57	71	-14	0	0	8
3	Montenegro	3	1	0	2	44	106	-62	0	1	5
4	Turkey	3	0	0	3	43	74	-31	0	1	1
Source - Points were awarded to the teams as follows: Win – 4 points | Draw – 2 points | At least 3 more tries than opponent – 1 point | Loss within 7 points – 1 point | Completing a Grand Slam – 1 point

Matches

1 October 2022
14:00 CEST (UTC+3)

Bosnia and Herzegovina	25–13	Turkey
	n/a

Kamberovića Polje, Zenica
Attendance: n/a
Referee: Benjamin Loader (Austria)

8 October 2022
14:00 CEST (UTC+2)

(1 TBP) Serbia	62–0	Montenegro
	Report

King Peter I Stadium, Belgrade
Attendance: 500
Referee: Andrei Gheorghe (Romania)

15 October 2022
14:00 TRT (UTC+3)

Turkey	6–23	Serbia (1 TBP)
	Report

Vakfıkebir İlçe Stadyumu, Trabzon
Attendance: 800
Referee: Sahar Zivan (Israel)

29 October 2022
12:00 CEST (UTC+3)

(1 LBP) Montenegro	18–20	Bosnia and Herzegovina
	Report

Stadion Topolica, Bar
Attendance: 300
Referee: Diogo Miranda (Portugal)

29 April 2023
14:00 CEST (UTC+3)

Bosnia and Herzegovina	12–40	Serbia (1 TBP)
	Report

Kamberovića Polje, Zenica
Attendance: 500
Referee: Mario Dragicevic (Croatia)

13 May 2023
11:00 CEST (UTC+3)

Montenegro	26–24	Turkey (1 LBP)
	Report

Stadion Topolica, Bar
Attendance: 200
Referee: Vaidotas Girdvaines Lithuania

== 2023 Rugby Europe Development ==
=== Conference 2 South ===
Champions and promoted

Place	Nation	Games				Points			TBP	LBP	Table points
Place	Nation	Played	Won	Drawn	Lost	For	Against	Diff	TBP	LBP	Table points
1	Austria	2	2	0	0	146	10	+136	2	0	10
2	Kosovo	2	0	0	2	10	146	-136	0	0	0
Source - Points were awarded to the teams as follows: Win – 4 points | Draw – 2 points | At least 3 more tries than opponent – 1 point | Loss within 7 points – 1 point | Completing a Grand Slam – 1 point

Matches

1 April 2023
13:00 CEST (UTC+2)

Kosovo	7–51	Austria (1 TBP)
	Report

Hajvali Stadium, Pristina
Attendance: 300
Referee: Tomasz Stepien (Poland)

22 April 2023
16:00 CEST (UTC+2)

(1 TBP) Austria	95–3	Kosovo
	Report

Sportanlage Stadlau, Vienna
Attendance: 500
Referee: Kevin Jalibat (Switzerland)

== Play-off ==
=== Conference 1 promotion to Trophy play-off ===
27 May 2023
14:00 CEST (UTC+2)

Czech Republic	64–19	Israel

RC Mountfield Říčany stadium. Říčany
Attendance: 1,000
Referee: Ethan Glass (Switzerland)
