= 2023–24 Rugby Europe International Championships =

- Date: 30 September 2023 – 25 May 2024
- Countries: 31

Tournament statistics
- Champions: Championship; Georgia (16); Trophy; Switzerland (2); Conference; Latvia (2); Luxembourg (1); Moldova (2); Malta (4); Development; Montenegro (1)
- Antim Cup: Georgia (18th title)
- Matches played: 60
- Attendance: 115,157 (1,919 per match)
- Tries scored: 421 (7.02 per match)

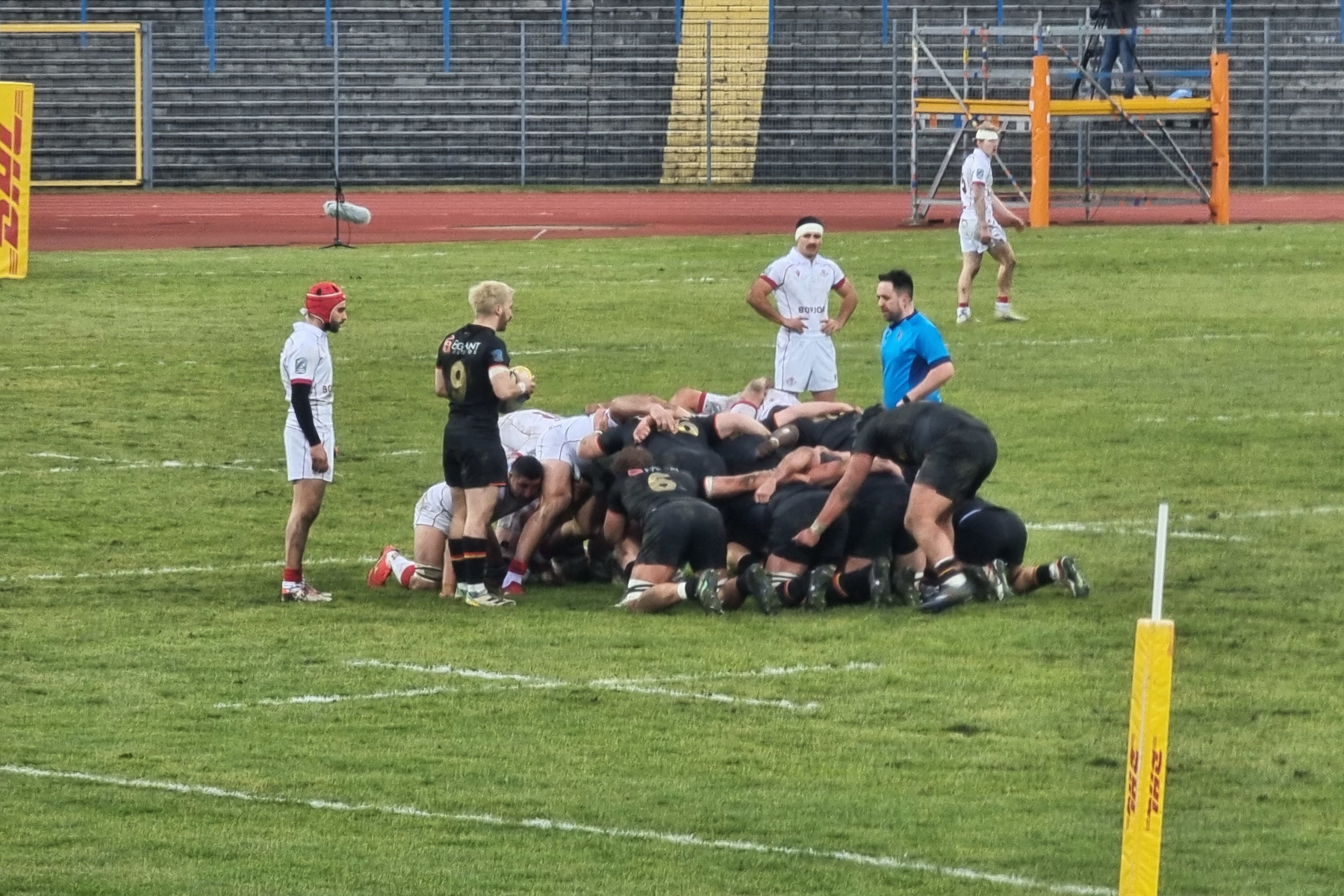
A scrum during Germany v Georgia, 2024 rugby union European Championship

The 2023–24 Rugby Europe International Championships was the European Championship for tier 2 and tier 3 rugby union nations.

== Countries ==
Pre-tournament World Rugby rankings in parentheses.

Championship
Pool A

- Georgia * (11)
- Germany (32)
- Netherlands (26)
- Spain (20)

Trophy

- Croatia (42)
- Czech Republic ↑ (35)
- Lithuania (40)
- Switzerland (27)
- Sweden (39)
- Ukraine (36)

Pool B

- Belgium (29)
- Poland (34)
- Portugal (16)
- Romania (19)

Conference
Pool A

- Andorra (88)
- Denmark (77)
- Finland (72)
- Latvia (60)
- Norway (100)

Pool C

- Bulgaria (59)
- Moldova (57)
- Serbia (71)
- Turkey (94)

Development

- Kosovo (NR)
- Montenegro ↓ (NR)

Pool B

- Austria ↑ (87)
- Bosnia and Herzegovina (93)
- Hungary (70)
- Luxembourg (64)
- Slovenia (80)

Pool D

- Cyprus (NR)
- Israel (61)
- Malta (44)

Legend:
* Champion of 2022–23 season; ↑ Promoted from lower division during 2021–22 season; • Division Champion but not promoted during 2021–22 season; ‡ Last place inside own division but not relegated during 2022–23; ↓ Relegated from higher division during 2022–23 season

== 2024 Rugby Europe Championship ==
=== Pool A ===
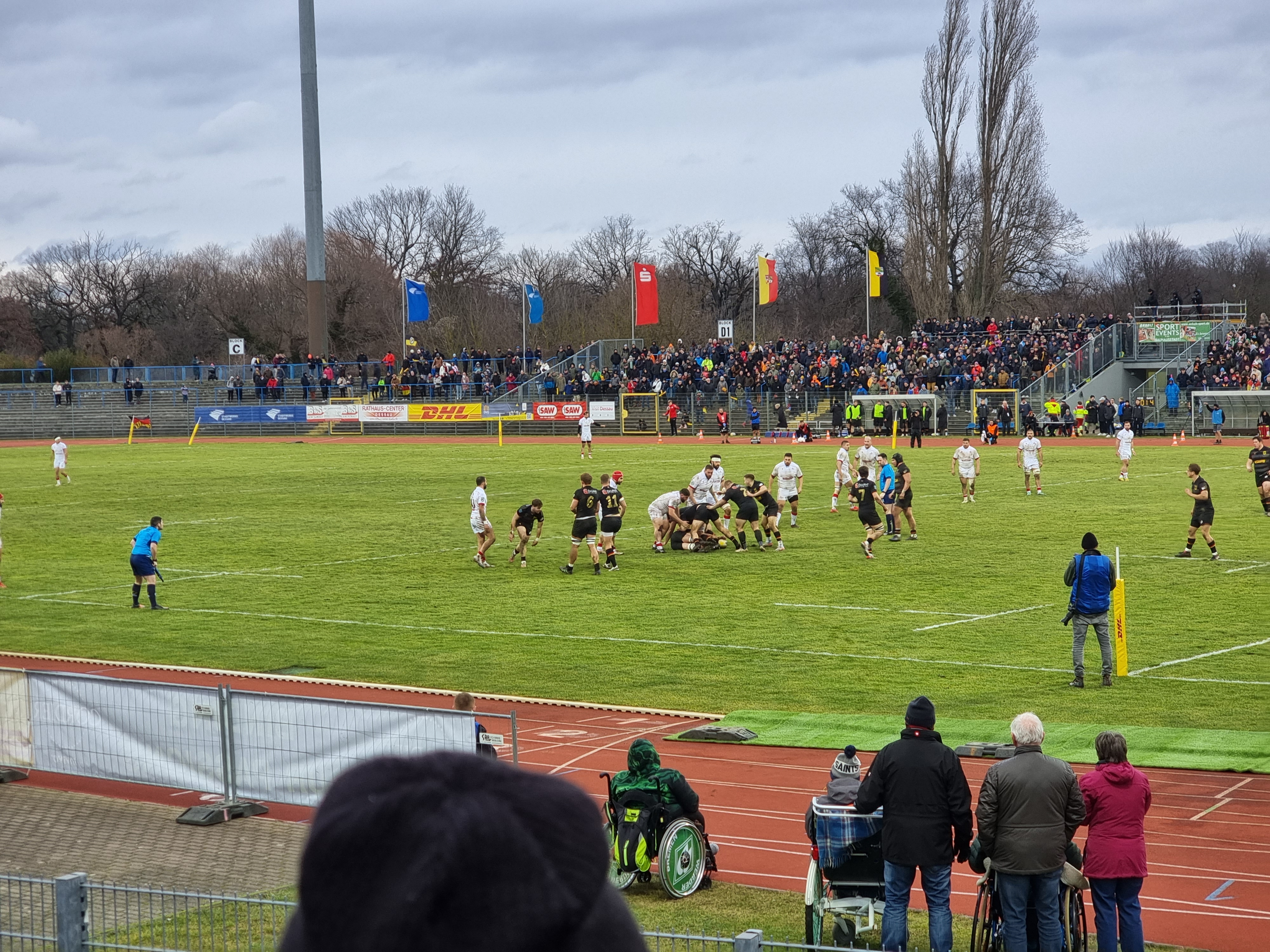
Germany against Georgia during the European Rugby Championship 2023/24 in Dessau-Roßlau.

Advances to the Grand Finals Semi-Finals
Advances to the Ranking Finals Semi-Finals

Pos.	Team	Games				Points			Tries			TBP	LBP	Table points
Pos.	Team	Played	Won	Drawn	Lost	For	Against	Diff	For	Against	Diff	TBP	LBP	Table points
1	Georgia	3	3	0	0	97	30	+67	15	3	+12	2	0	14
2	Spain	3	2	0	1	50	61	-11	6	9	-3	1	0	9
3	Netherlands	3	1	0	2	67	64	+3	8	8	0	1	1	6
4	Germany	3	0	0	3	35	94	-59	4	13	-9	0	0	0
Source - Points were awarded to the teams as follows: Win – 4 points | Draw – 2 points | At least 3 more tries than opponent – 1 point | Loss within 7 points – 1 point

=== Pool B ===
Advances to the Grand Finals Semi-Finals
Advances to the Ranking Finals Semi-Finals

Pos.	Team	Games				Points			Tries			TBP	LBP	Table points
Pos.	Team	Played	Won	Drawn	Lost	For	Against	Diff	For	Against	Diff	TBP	LBP	Table points
1	Portugal	3	2	0	1	109	41	+68	14	5	+9	2	1	11
2	Romania	3	2	0	1	77	75	+2	11	9	+2	1	0	9
3	Belgium	3	2	0	1	59	49	+10	7	6	+1	1	0	9
4	Poland	3	0	0	3	25	105	-80	3	15	-12	0	0	0
Source - Points were awarded to the teams as follows: Win – 4 points | Draw – 2 points | At least 3 more tries than opponent – 1 point | Loss within 7 points – 1 point

Matches
Group Stage

3 February 2024
13:15 CET (UTC+1)

(1 LBP) Netherlands	18–20	Spain
	Report

NRCA Stadium, Amsterdam
Attendance: 1,400
Referee: Hollie Davidson (Scotland)

3 February 2024
20:00 CET (UTC+1)

Belgium	10–6	Portugal (1 LBP)
	Report

Stade Charles Tondreau, Mons
Attendance: 4,600
Referee: Saba Abulashvili (Georgia)

4 February 2024
15:00 CET (UTC+1)

Germany	17–28	Georgia
	Report

Paul Greifzu Stadium, Dessau-Roßlau
Attendance: 5,400
Referee: Tom Spurrier (Wales)

4 February 2024
18:15 CET (UTC+1)

Poland	8–20	Romania
	Report

Narodowym stadion dla rugby, Gdynia
Attendance: 2,500
Referee: Keane Davison (Ireland)

10 February 2024
14:00 GET (UTC+4)

(1 TBP) Georgia	31–10	Netherlands
	Report

Avchala Stadium, Tbilisi
Attendance: 2,963
Referee: Alexandru Ionescu (Romania)

10 February 2024
14:30 EET (UTC+2)

(1 TBP) Romania	33–18	Belgium
	Report

Arcul de Triumf Stadium, Bucharest
Attendance: 5,500
Referee: Inigo Atorrasagasti (Spain)

10 February 2024
20:00 CET (UTC+1)

(1 TBP) Portugal	54–7	Poland
	Report

Estádio Nacional, Oeiras
Attendance: 2,300
Referee: Ethan Glass (Switzerland)

11 February 2024
12:45 CET (UTC+1)

(1 TBP) Spain	27–5	Germany
	Report

Estadio Nacional Complutense, Madrid
Attendance: 6,000
Referee: Paulo Duarte (Portugal)

17 February 2024
16:00 GET (UTC+4)

(1 TBP) Georgia	38–3	Spain
	Report

Avchala Stadium, Tbilisi
Referee: Sam Grove White (Scotland)

17 February 2024
14:00 EET (UTC+2)

Romania	24–49	Portugal (1 TBP)
	Report

Arcul de Triumf Stadium, Bucharest
Attendance: 5,000
Referee: Nika Amashukeli (Georgia)

17 February 2024
18:00 CET (UTC+1)

(1 TBP) Belgium	39–10	Poland
	Report

Stade du Pachy, Waterloo
Attendance: 2,000
Referee: Ben Breakspear (Wales)

18 February 2024
13:30 CET (UTC+1)

(1 TBP) Netherlands	39–13	Germany
	report

NRCA Stadium, Amsterdam
Attendance: 2,000
Referee: Michael Forrestal (Ireland)

Ranking Finals

=== Semi-Finals ===
2 March 2024
16:15 CET (UTC+1)

Netherlands	54–7	Poland
	Report

NRCA Stadium, Amsterdam
Attendance: 1,700
Referee: Inigo Atorrasagasti (Spain)

2 March 2024
19:00 CET (UTC+1)

Belgium	11–21	Germany
	Report

Stade du Pachy, Waterloo
Attendance: 2,500
Referee: Sam Grove White (Scotland

=== Seventh Place Final ===
17 March 2024
12:00 CET (UTC+1)

Poland	8–34	Belgium
	Report

Stade Jean-Bouin, Paris
Attendance: 2,000
Referee: Shota Tevzadze (Georgia)

=== Fifth Place Final ===
17 March 2024
14:45 CET (UTC+1)

Netherlands	45–0	Germany
	Report

Stade Jean-Bouin, Paris
Attendance: 2,000
Referee: Paulo Duarte (Portugal)

Grand Finals

=== Semi-Finals ===
2 March 2024
16:00 GET (UTC+4)

Georgia	43–5	Romania
	Report

Mikheil Meskhi Stadium, Tbilisi
Attendance: 10,300
Referee: Peter Martin (Ireland)

3 March 2024
15:00 WET (UTC+0)

Portugal	33–30	Spain
	Report

Estádio do Restelo, Lisbon
Attendance: 8,000
Referee: Benoit Rousselet (France)

=== Bronze Final ===
17 March 2024
18:15 CET (UTC+1)

Romania	33–40	Spain
	Report

Stade Jean-Bouin, Paris
Attendance: 6,000
Referee: Adam Jones (Wales)

=== Cup Final ===
17 March 2024
21:00 CET (UTC+1)

Georgia	36–10	Portugal
	Report

Stade Jean-Bouin, Paris
Attendance: 8,000
Referee: Dual Trainini (France)

== 2023–24 Rugby Europe Trophy ==
Champions
Relegated to Conference

Place	Nation	Games				Points			Tries			TBP	LBP	Table points
Place	Nation	Played	Won	Drawn	Lost	For	Against	Diff	For	Against	Diff	TBP	LBP	Table points
1	Switzerland (P)	5	5	0	0	198	64	+134	25	8	+17	2	0	22
2	Sweden	5	4	0	1	145	112	+33	21	13	+8	2	0	18
3	Czech Republic	5	3	0	2	192	153	+39	26	19	+7	2	0	14
4	Croatia	5	2	0	3	130	132	-2	20	10	+1	2	1	11
5	Lithuania	5	1	0	4	103	143	-40	12	20	-8	0	0	4
6	Ukraine	5	0	0	5	61	225	-164	8	33	-25	0	0	0
Source - Points were awarded to the teams as follows: Win – 4 points | Draw – 2 points | At least 3 more tries than opponent – 1 point | Loss within 7 points – 1 point | Completing a Grand Slam – 1 point (P) - promoted to 2025 Rugby Europe Championship

Matches

28 October 2023
14:00 CEST (UTC+2)

Sweden	48–37	Czech Republic
	Report

Stockholm Olympic Stadium, Stockholm
Attendance: 1,400
Referee: Eugeniu Procopi (Moldova)

4 November 2023
13:00 CET (UTC+1)

(1 TBP) Czech Republic	48–22	Croatia
	Report

Markéta Stadium, Prague
Attendance: 1,000
Referee: Adrian Pawlik (Poland)

4 November 2023
14:00 CET (UTC +1)

Ukraine	14–32	Lithuania
	Report

Makarska City Stadium, Makarska
Attendance: 300
Referee: Ethan Glass (Switzerland)

4 November 2023
15:30 CET (UTC+1)

Switzerland	23–12	Sweden
	Report

Stade Municipal, Yverdon-les-Bains
Attendance: n/a
Referee: Killian O'Brien (Germany)

11 November 2023
14:00 EET (UTC+2)

Lithuania	17–31	Switzerland
	Report

Klaipėda Central Stadium, Klaipėda
Attendance: 500
Referee: Sulkhan Chikladze (Georgia)

11 November 2023
14:30 CET (UTC +1)

Ukraine	5–41	Croatia (1 TBP)
	Report

Makarska City Stadium, Makarska
Attendance: 1,000
Referee: Luis Fernandez (Spain)

18 November 2023
14:30 CET (UTC +1)

(1 LBP) Croatia	20–22	Sweden
	Report

Stadion NŠC Stjepan Spajić, Zagreb
Attendance: 1,000
Referee: Lukasz Jasinski (Poland)

25 November 2023
14:00 CET (UTC+1)

Czech Republic	34–24	Lithuania
	Report

Markéta Stadium, Prague
Attendance: 700
Referee: Gert Visser (Netherlands)

9 March 2024
14:00 CET (UTC+1)

Czech Republic	25–41	Switzerland
	Report

Markéta Stadium, Prague
Attendance: 600
Referee: Joshua Ferreira (Germany)

16 March 2024
14:30 CET (UTC+1)

(1 TBP) Croatia	37–22	Lithuania
	Report

Stadion NŠC Stjepan Spajić, Zagreb
Attendance: 300
Referee: Maria Latos (Germany)

23 March 2024
13:00 CET (UTC+1)

Ukraine	18–48	Czech Republic (1 TBP)
	Report

Rugby Club Havirov Stadium, Havířov
Attendance: 1,500
Referee: Mike Hawkins (Denmark)

23 March 2024
14:00 EET (UTC+2)

Lithuania	8–27	Sweden (1 TBP)
	Report

Šiauliai Rugby Academy Stadium, Šiauliai
Attendance: 300
Referee: Pedro Mendes-Silva (Portugal)

23 March 2024
15:30 CET (UTC+1)

(1 TBP) Switzerland	35–10	Croatia
	Report

Stade Municipal, Yverdon-les-Bains
Attendance: 1,518
Referee: Nicola Fratila (Romania)

6 April 2024
14:00 CEST (UTC+2)

(1 TBP) Sweden	36–24	Ukraine
	Report

Östervångsstadion, Trelleborg
Attendance: 1,200
Referee: Gert Visser (Netherlands)

13 April 2024
15:30 CEST (UTC+2)

(1 TBP) Switzerland	68–0	Ukraine
	Report

Utogrund, Zürich
Attendance: 2,500
Referee: Ignacio Munoz Martin (Spain)

== 2023–24 Rugby Europe Conference ==
=== Pool A ===
Champions

Place	Nation	Games				Points			TBP	LBP	Table points
Place	Nation	Played	Won	Drawn	Lost	For	Against	Diff	TBP	LBP	Table points
1	Latvia	4	3	0	1	128	78	+50	3	0	15
2	Finland	4	3	0	1	116	63	+53	2	0	14
3	Denmark	4	2	0	2	112	56	+56	2	2	12
4	Andorra	4	2	0	2	68	72	-4	2	0	10
5	Norway	4	0	0	4	28	183	-155	0	0	0
Source - Points were awarded to the teams as follows: Win – 4 points | Draw – 2 points | At least 3 more tries than opponent – 1 point | Loss within 7 points – 1 point | Completing a Grand Slam – 1 point

Matches

30 September 2023
15:00 CEST (UTC+2)

(1 TBP) Denmark	36–8	Andorra
	Report

Rugby Club Speed Stadium, Copenhagen
Attendance: 300
Referee: Phila Bitterhout (Netherlands)

7 October 2023
15:00 EEST (UTC+3)

Finland	14–10	Denmark (1 LBP)
	Report

Myllypuro Sports Park, Helsinki
Attendance: 100
Referee: Vadims Galajevs (Latvia)

21 October 2023
15:00 EEST (UTC+3)

Finland	17–46	Latvia (1 TBP)
	Report

Myllypuro Sports Park, Helsinki
Attendance: 200
Referee: Romain Rouzairol (Norway)

4 November 2023
17:00 CET (UTC+1)

(1 TBP) Andorra	28–0 (Note: Latvia forfeited the fixture due to insufficient finances)	Latvia
	n/a

Estadi Nacional, Andorra la Vella
Attendance: n/a
Referee: n/a

11 November 2023
13:00 EET (UTC+2)

(1 TBP) Latvia	53–8	Norway
	Report

Baldones Stadions, Baldone
Attendance: 300
Referee: Gela Lemonjava (Georgia)

13 April 2024
n/a

Andorra	0–28 (Note: Cancelled due to a dispute between the Union and the local government)	Finland (1 TBP)
	n/a

n/a
Attendance: n/a
Referee: n/a

13 April 2024
14:00 CEST (UTC+2)

(1 TBP) Denmark	41–5	Norway
	Report

Rugby Club Speed Stadium, Copenhagen
Attendance: 400
Referee: Vladislav Ilnitskyi (Ukraine)

20 April 2024
13:00 EEST (UTC+3)

(1 TBP) Latvia	29–25	Denmark (1 LBP)
	Report

Zemgale Olympic Center stadium, Jelgava
Attendance: 350
Referee: Diogo Miranda (Portugal)

4 May 2024
14:00 CEST (UTC+2)

Norway	8–32	Andorra (1 TBP)
	Report

Lystlunden Stadion, Horten
Attendance: 150
Referee: Joshua Jahn (Germany)

11 May 2024
14:00 CEST (UTC+2)

Norway	7–57	Finland (1 TBP)
	Report

Lystlunden Stadion, Horten
Attendance: 80
Referee: Vaidotas Girdvainis (Lithuania)

=== Pool B ===
Champions and advances to Promotion play-off

Place	Nation	Games				Points			TBP	LBP	Table points
Place	Nation	Played	Won	Drawn	Lost	For	Against	Diff	TBP	LBP	Table points
1	Luxembourg	4	4	0	0	190	46	+144	3	0	19
2	Hungary	4	2	0	2	133	70	+63	2	1	11
3	Austria	4	2	0	2	112	111	+1	2	0	10
4	Slovenia	4	2	0	2	72	151	-79	0	0	8
5	Bosnia and Herzegovina	4	0	0	4	57	186	-129	0	1	1
Source - Points were awarded to the teams as follows: Win – 4 points | Draw – 2 points | At least 3 more tries than opponent – 1 point | Loss within 7 points – 1 point | Completing a Grand Slam – 1 point

Matches

30 September 2023
15:00 CEST (UTC+2)

Austria	10–53	Hungary (1 TBP)
	Report

Pappelstadion, Mattersburg
Attendance: 500
Referee: Emmanuel Jacques (Denmark)

14 October 2023
14:00 CEST (UTC+2)

Bosnia and Herzegovina	10–59	Luxembourg (1 TBP)
	Report

Kamberovica Polje Stadium, Zenica
Attendance: 150
Referee: Andrei Gheorghe (Romania)

14 October 2023
14:30 CEST (UTC+2)

Hungary	17–29	Slovenia
	Report

Budapest Rugby Center, Budapest
Attendance: 1,000
Referee: Ondrej Fort (Czech Republic)

21 October 2023
14:00 CEST (UTC+2)

Slovenia	22–17	Bosnia and Herzegovina (1 LBP)
	Report

Oval Rugby Stadium, Ljubljana
Attendance: 500
Referee: Anatolie Tipa (Moldova)

4 November 2023
18:00 CET (UTC+1)

(1 TBP) Luxembourg	27–14	Austria
	Report

Stade de Luxembourg, Gasperich
Attendance: 1,200
Referee: Kevin Jalibat (Switzerland)

6 April 2024
14:00 CEST (UTC+2)

(1 LBP) Hungary	15–18	Luxembourg
	Report

National Rugby Center, Budapest
Attendance: 400
Referee: Adele Robert (Belgium)

6 April 2024
15:00 CEST (UTC+2)

(1 TBP) Austria	57–17	Bosnia and Herzegovina
	Report

Stadion Stadlau, Vienna
Attendance: 200
Referee: Valeriu Chipercean (Moldova)

13 April 2024
13:45 CEST (UTC+2)

Slovenia	14–31	Austria (1 TBP)
	Report

Oval Rugby Stadium, Ljubljana
Attendance: 200
Referee: Edwin Vanderspeck (Netherlands)

20 April 2024
14:00 CEST (UTC+2)

Bosnia and Herzegovina	13–48	Hungary (1 TBP)
	Report

Kamberovica Polje Stadium, Zenica
Attendance: 500
Referee: Vadims Galajevs (Latvia)

20 April 2024
18:00 CEST (UTC+2)

(1 TBP) Luxembourg	86–7	Slovenia
	Report

Stade de Luxembourg, Gasperich
Attendance: 1,250
Referee: Francisco Serra (Portugal)

=== Pool C ===
Champions and advances to Promotion play-off

Place	Nation	Games				Points			TBP	LBP	Table points
Place	Nation	Played	Won	Drawn	Lost	For	Against	Diff	TBP	LBP	Table points
1	Moldova	3	3	0	0	112	31	+81	2	0	14
2	Bulgaria	3	2	0	1	76	79	-3	1	0	9
3	Turkey	3	1	0	2	69	95	-26	0	0	4
4	Serbia	3	0	0	3	40	122	-82	0	0	0
Source - Points were awarded to the teams as follows: Win – 4 points | Draw – 2 points | At least 3 more tries than opponent – 1 point | Loss within 7 points – 1 point | Completing a Grand Slam – 1 point

Matches

30 September 2023
16:00 TRT (UTC+3)

Turkey	14–33	Moldova
	Report

Atatürk Olympic Stadium, Istanbul
Attendance: 350
Referee: Filippos Manolopoulos (Austria)

7 October 2023
13:00 EEST (UTC+3)

(1 TBP) Moldova	31–11	Serbia
	Report

Dinamo stadium, Chișinău
Attendance: 500
Referee: Nicolae Fratila (Romania)

28 October 2023
15:00 EEST (UTC+3)

Bulgaria	40–24	Turkey
	Report

Vasil Levski National Stadium, Sofia
Attendance: 3,500
Referee: Diogo Inacio (Portugal)

13 April 2024
15:00 CEST (UTC+2)

Serbia	22–31	Turkey
	Report

Borac Starčevo Stadium, Starčevo
Attendance: 200
Referee: Liam Wright (Netherlands)

20 April 2024
15:00 EEST (UTC+3)

(1 TBP) Bulgaria	30–7	Serbia
	Report

Vasil Levski National Stadium, Sofia
Attendance: 1,200
Referee: Dominik Jastrzebski (Poland)

4 May 2024
16:00 EEST (UTC+3)

(1 TBP) Moldova	48–6	Bulgaria
	Report

Dinamo stadium, Chișinău
Attendance: 1,500
Referee: Eki Fanlo (Spain)

=== Pool D ===
Champions

Place	Nation	Games				Points			TBP	LBP	Table points
Place	Nation	Played	Won	Drawn	Lost	For	Against	Diff	TBP	LBP	Table points
1	Malta	2	2	0	0	46	31	+15	0	0	8
2	Cyprus	2	0	0	2	31	46	-15	0	1	1
3	Israel	0	0	0	0	0	0	0	0	0	0
Source - Points were awarded to the teams as follows: Win – 4 points | Draw – 2 points | At least 3 more tries than opponent – 1 point | Loss within 7 points – 1 point | Completing a Grand Slam – 1 point

Matches

4 November 2023
14:00 CET (UTC+1)

Malta	22–17	Cyprus
	Report

Tony Bezzina Stadium, Paola
Attendance: 1,500
Referee: Ivan Zelic (Croatia)

4 May 2024
14:00 EEST (UTC+3)

Cyprus	14–24	Malta
	Report

Tsirio Stadium, Limassol
Attendance: 427
Referee: Paul Warman (Germany)

n/a
n/a

Cyprus	Cancelled (Note: Cancelled due to the Gaza war)	Israel
	n/a

n/a
Attendance: n/a
Referee: n/a

n/a
n/a

Israel	Cancelled	Malta
	n/a

n/a
Attendance: n/a
Referee: n/a

n/a
n/a

Israel	Cancelled	Cyprus
	n/a

n/a
Attendance: n/a
Referee: n/a

n/a
n/a

Malta	Cancelled	Israel
	n/a

n/a
Attendance: n/a
Referee: n/a

== 2023–24 Rugby Europe Development ==
Champions and promoted
Promoted

Place	Nation	Games				Points			TBP	LBP	Table points
Place	Nation	Played	Won	Drawn	Lost	For	Against	Diff	TBP	LBP	Table points
1	Montenegro	2	1	0	1	35	39	-4	1	0	5
2	Kosovo	2	1	0	1	39	35	+4	0	0	4
Source - Points were awarded to the teams as follows: Win – 4 points | Draw – 2 points | At least 3 more tries than opponent – 1 point | Loss within 7 points – 1 point | Completing a Grand Slam – 1 point

Matches

3 December 2023
14:00 CET (UTC+1)

Kosovo	27–0	Montenegro
	Report

Hajvali Stadium, Pristina
Attendance: n/a
Referee: John Stuyck (Belgium)

14 April 2024
13:50 CEST (UTC+3)

(1 TBP) Montenegro	35–12	Kosovo
	Report

Stadion Topolica, Bar
Attendance: 500
Referee: Victor Lungu (Moldova)

== Play-off ==
=== Conference promotion to Trophy play-off ===
25 May 2024
18:00 CEST (UTC+2)

Luxembourg	19–0	Moldova
	Report

Stade Josy Barthel, Luxembourg
Attendance: 1,000
Referee: Luis Fernandez (Spain)
