= Albanian Rugby League =

Sports governing body in Albania

Club information
- Full name: Albanian Rugby League
- Nickname: The Eagles
- Short name: ARL
- Colours: Red and Black
- Founded: 2017
- Website: https://albaniarl.wordpress.com/

Current details
- Coach: Peter Grayburn
- Manager: Alan Vernon
- Captain: Shaban Penxho

Albanian Rugby League (ARL) represents Albania in international rugby league tournaments, as well as organizes domestic competitions, and undertakes development projects. Rugby league is a new sport in Albania, which has been officially registered since 2017. The popularity of rugby league is struggling for attention in the national media. However, since the creation of the ARL national team and the introduction of Tirana Rugby Club (founded in 2013) in the Greek championship, coverage has increased with articles appearing in different rugby league official forums and newspapers.

== History ==
Although not formal at the time, the first steps of this non-profit organization were made back in 2010. Initially, a rugby union team (Tirana RC) was founded by two pupils of a central high-school in the city of Tirana. Facing difficulties in recruiting new players, due to the high number of players required in a rugby union game, a switch from rugby union to rugby league ensued in 2017. In 2018 as part of the festival of rugby league surrounding the U19 European Championships in Belgrade, the Albania National Team also participated in the 9s tournament. In 2018 Albanian Rugby League was also granted the observer status, becoming the 39th member nation of RLEF. In 2019 the ARL played against GB Pioneers, a team consisting of students from top universities across Great Britain and Northern Ireland.

=== Rugby League Clubs in Albania ===
- Tirana Rugby Club (Tirana Regbi Klub)
- Ilirët Rugby Club (Iliret Regbi Klub)

== Governing body ==
Albanian Rugby League is the governing body in rugby league in Albania, managing development and participation at all levels in the sport.

== Competitions ==
Since the creation of the ARL, the team has taken part in a few competitions in the Balkans.

== The National Team ==
=== Coaching Team ===
Management
Name	Position
James Finch	Assistant coach
Kein Tridiu	Doctor
Dejv Dashi	Physio

== Results ==
Date	Home	Score	Away	Competition	Venue
11 Aug 2018	Turkey	28-4	Albanian Eagles	Balkan 9s	Serbia-Belgrade
11 Aug 2018	Albanian Eagles	4-8	Bulgaria	Balkan 9s	Serbia-Belgrade
11 Aug 2018	Bosnia and Herzegovina	10-22	Albania Eagles	Balkan 9s	Serbia-Belgrade
14 Sep 2019	Albanian Eagles	0-48	GB Pioneers	Friendly	Tirana (Kamza Stadium), Albania
04.07.2021	Albanian Eagles	12-22	Serbia U21	Friendly	Shkodër (Kompleksi Smijani)
17.07.2022	Team Colostomy	6-20	Albanian Eagles	Friendly 9s	Chiswick Rugby Club (Londong-UK)
17.07.2022	Norway Vikings	4-14	Albanian Eagles	Friendly 9s	Chiswick Rugby Club (Londong-UK)
17.07.2022	Bangor Buffaloes	20-0	Albanian Eagles	Friendly 9s	Chiswick Rugby Club (Londong-UK)
