= RK Baldone =

Latvian rugby club

Regbija klubs Baldone
- Founded: 2004
- Disbanded: 2014
- Location: Baldone, Latvia
- Ground(s): Baldones stadions
- President: Kārlis Dilbo (also player-coach)
Team kit

RK Baldone was a Latvian rugby club based in Baldone. It was founded in 2004.

In May 2014 the club's A team was suspended from the Latvian Rugby Championship after failing to arrive for two consecutive games. Meanwhile, the manager of the club, Kārlis Dilbo, had informed press about the dissolution of the main adult team of the club.
