= Rugby union in Albania =

- Country: Albania
- Governing body: None
- National team(s): Albania
- First played: 2013
- Registered players: Unknown
- Clubs: 2

Club competitions
- Kupa Skënderbeu

Rugby union in Albania is a minor but growing team sport in the country, and progress is continuing with the aim of creating a federation for the sport once four teams become active.

== Teams ==
- Tirana Rugby Club (2013–)
- Ilirët Rugby Club (2016–)
