= Rugby union in Moldova =

- Country: Moldova
- Governing body: Moldovan Rugby Federation
- National team: Moldova
- First played: Mid 20th century
- Registered players: 3,729
- Clubs: 6

National competitions
- Rugby World Cup; Rugby World Cup Sevens; IRB Sevens World Series; European Nations Cup

Rugby union in Moldova is a popular sport. The governing body in Moldova is the Moldovan Rugby Federation (Federatia de Rugby din Moldovei).

== History ==
=== Soviet Period ===
Rugby union was played in the Russian Empire as early as in 1908. In 1934, the Moscow Championship was started, and in 1936, the first Soviet Championship took place.

In 1949, rugby union was forbidden in the USSR during the "fight against the cosmopolitanism". The competitions were resumed in 1957, and the Soviet Championship in 1966. In 1975, the Soviet national team played their first match.

Rugby union appears to have been introduced to the Moldavian SSR in 1967.

Moldova had its own rugby team in the USSR, but it was not treated as a proper national side.

=== Post-independence ===
Perhaps surprisingly, the popularity of rugby in Moldova is growing rapidly, with well over 10,000 fans regularly turning up to their home matches in the European Nations Cup. Since 2004, the number of Moldovan rugby players has more than doubled, due to the national team's growing international reputation. Rugby union in Romania is quite a major sport, going back ninety years, and as Moldova shares language and a border with Romania, this has helped its popularity in the country.

== National team ==
The Moldova national rugby union team represents Moldova in international rugby union matches. They have yet to qualify for the Rugby World Cup.

== Sevens ==
According to the IRB website, Moldova will play in their first-ever IRB Sevens World Series event when the season reaches its climax in Scotland.

== Women's rugby ==
Although Moldova's women have not yet played test match rugby, they have been playing international sevens rugby since 2007. (Current playing record).

== See also ==
- Sport in Moldova
