= Albania national rugby union team =

First international
- Albania 12–40 Kosovo (Kukes, Albania; 14 January 2024)

Biggest win
- Kosovo 0 – 88 Albania (Istog, Kosovo; 15 March 2025)

Biggest defeat
- Albania 12–40 Kosovo (Kukes, Albania; 14 January 2024)

World Cup
- Appearances: 0

The Albania national rugby team is the representative of Albania in the rugby union. It was established on 6 February 2010 in Pordenone. The team's first international participation was at the "Alpe, Adria and Balkans Cup" on June 11, 2011, placing 6th.

== Record ==
Below is a table of the representative rugby matches played by an Albania national XV at test level up until 14 November 2026, updated after the match with Slovakia.

Opponent	Played	Won	Lost	Drawn	% Won
Greece	1	1	0	0	100%
Kosovo	2	1	1	0	50%
Montenegro	1	0	1	0	0%
Slovakia	2	1	1	0	50%
Total	6	3	3	0	50%

== See also ==
- Rugby union in Albania
