= Kosovo national rugby union team =

Kosovo
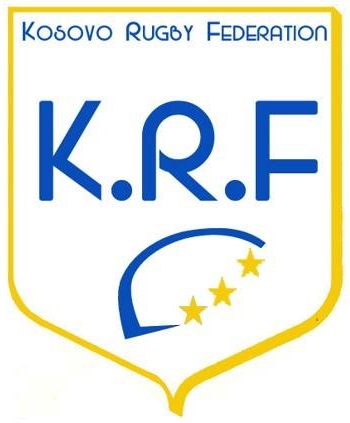
- Union: Kosovo Rugby Federation
- Nickname: Dardanët (Dardanians)
- Coach: Mark Barrett
- Captain: Mehdi Kransniqi
- Top scorer: Mehdi Kransniqi (10)
- Most tries: Mehdi Kransniqi (1)

First international
- Kosovo 7–52 Austria (1 April 2023)

Largest win
- Kosovo 27–0 Montenegro (3 December 2023)

Largest defeat
- Montenegro 101–0 Kosovo (2 May 2026)

The Kosovo national rugby union team is the national rugby union side representing Kosovo.

== History ==
The Kosovo Rugby Federation was established in September 2018 and was accepted into Rugby Europe during their 103rd meeting on 3 December 2021. The Kosovo national rugby union team is expected to play its first competitive match on 1 April 2023 at home to Austria in the 2022–23 Rugby Europe International Championships, Development tier.

== Competitive record ==
=== Rugby Europe International Championships ===
Rugby Europe International Championships
Year	Division	Pos	Pld	W	D	L	P/R
before 2023	Team did not exist						
2023	Development	2	2	0	0	2	-
2024	Development	2	2	1	0	1	
2025	Conference	4	1	0	0	1	
Total							

== Squad ==
Squad for 1st game against Austria
No.	Name	Position	Club/Province
1	Armir Sfarqa	Prop	(England) Finchley RFC
2	Agon Ademi	Hooker	(Kosovo) Bears RFC
3	Edon Grajqevci	Prop	(France) Provins RC
4	Arjanit Ibishi	Lock	(Kosovo) Bears RFC
5	Daris Lekovic	Lock	(Kosovo) Peja Eagles
6	Leart Hoxha	Backrow	(Kosovo) Bears RFC
7	Ardian Beqiri	Backrow	(Switzerland) Winterthur
8	Ramadam Elshani	Backrow	(Kosovo) Bears RFC
9	Granit Hasani	Scrumhalf	(Kosovo) Peja Eagles
10	Mehdi Kransniqi (c)	Flyhalf	(France) Epernay Champagne
11	Ardit Koci	Winger	(Kosovo) Bears RFC
12	Naser Sahitaj	Centre	(Germany) TGS Haussen
13	Kushtrim Dragusha	Centre	(Kosovo) Bears RFC
14	Azdren Celaj	Winger	(Kosovo) Bears RFC
15	Elton Rexhepi	Fullback	(Kosovo) Bears RFC
16	Diamant Rexhepi	Hooker	(Kosovo) Bears RFC
17	Albion Ukaj	Prop	(France) Annemasse RC
18	Shaipridion Begolli	Lock	(Kosovo) Bears RFC
19	Dardan Gashi	Centre	(Kosovo) Peja Eagles
20	Bekim Elezi	Scrumhalf	(Germany) SCS Rugby Berlin
21	Fatmir Ismajli	Fullback	(Kosovo) Bears RFC
22	Saud Slivova	Winger	(Kosovo) Bears RFC
23	Artan Hasani	Winger	(Kosovo) Bears RFC

== Fixtures and results ==
=== 2023 ===
1 April
13:00

Kosovo	7 – 52	Austria
	Report

Hajvali Stadium, Pristina, Kosovo

22 April
16:00

Austria	95 – 3	Kosovo
	Report

Wiener Sport-Club, Vienna, Austria

3 December
13:00

Kosovo	27 – 0	Montenegro
	Report

Hajvali Stadium, Pristina, Kosovo

=== 2024 ===
14 January
13:00

Albania	12 – 34	Kosovo

Kukes Arena, Kukes, Albania

13 April
13:00

Montenegro	35 – 12	Kosovo
	Report

Madzarica Stadium, Bar, Montenegro

29 September
11:00

Kosovo	10 – 55	Montenegro
	Report

Demush Mavraj Stadium, Istog, Kosovo

12 October
12:50

Slovenia	74 – 10	Kosovo
	Report

Oval Stadion, Ljubljana, Slovenia

=== 2025 ===
15 March
?

Kosovo	0 – 88	Albania

Stadiumi Demush Mavraj, Istog, Kosovo

5 April
?

Bosnia and Herzegovina	77 – 10	Kosovo

Kamberovica Polje, Zenica, Bosnia and Herzegovina

== Head-to-head record ==
Below is a table of the representative rugby matches played by a Kosovo national XV at test level up until 10 October 2026, updated after match with Greece.

Opponents	Matches	Won	Draw	Lost	For	Aga	Diff	Win%
Albania	2	1	0	1	34	100	-66	50%
Austria	2	0	0	2	10	147	-137	0%
Bosnia and Herzegovina	2	0	0	2	15	147	-132	0%
Greece	2	0	0	2	12	87	-75	0%
Montenegro	5	1	0	4	76	229	-163	20%
Slovenia	1	0	0	1	10	74	-64	0%
Total	14	2	0	12	157	784	-627	14.29%

== See also ==
- Kosovo national rugby sevens team
