= Rugby union in Lithuania =

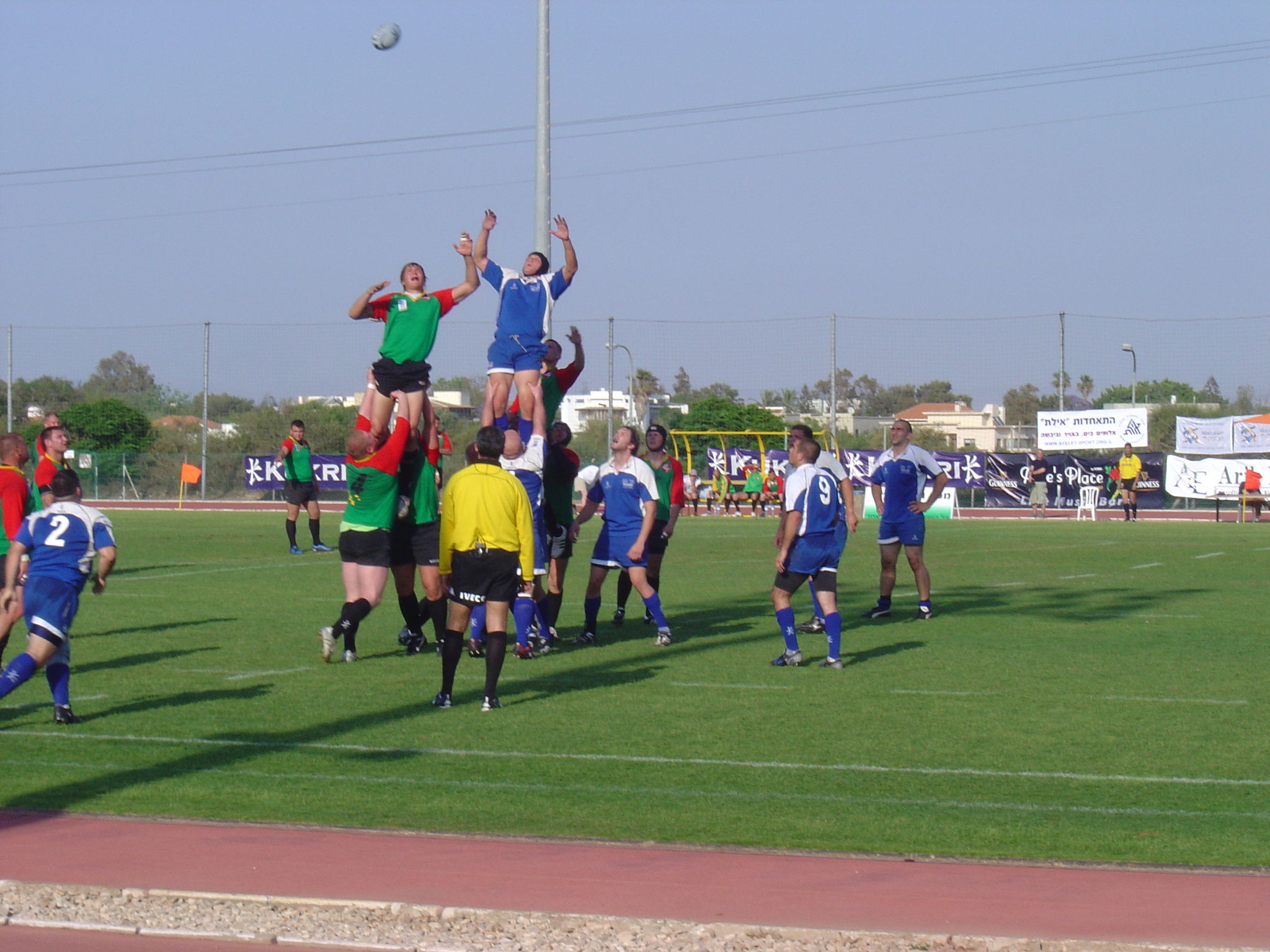
- Lithuania playing Israel
- Country: Lithuania
- National team: Lithuania
- First played: 1961
- Registered players: 1,650
- Clubs: 15

National competitions
- Rugby World Cup; Rugby World Cup Sevens; IRB Sevens World Series; European Nations Cup

Club competitions
- Lithuanian Rugby Championship

Rugby union in Lithuania is a moderately popular sport.

== Governing body ==
The Lithuanian Rugby Federation (Lietuvos Regbio Federacija) was founded in 1961 and joined the IRB in 1993 after Lithuanian had regained its independence. It is responsible for organizing and developing the sport at various levels within the country. Although the union was formed in the 1960s, it was not considered a full-fledged national union until after the breakup of the USSR.

== History ==
=== Soviet Era ===
Rugby union arrived in Lithuania in the 1960s. The first domestic game was played in 1961. Lithuania was never a stronghold of rugby in the USSR. The game was mainly played in Russia and Georgia.

Lithuania had its own national rugby team in the USSR, but it was not treated as an international side.

Republic championship was played since 1963.

=== Post-independence ===
Rugby is spread across the country with Šiauliai as the sport's stronghold. There are rugby clubs in all major Lithuanian cities. Some smaller towns only have junior teams. The climate in the country hinders the development of the sport, because the ground is frozen for four months of the year. Snow rugby is played in winter.

The game has experienced some growth in the independence period particularly following the record-breaking performances by the Lithuania national rugby union team in the European Nations Cup. There is some rivalry with neighbours Latvia who were the better side in the 1990s. However, in recent years Lithuania has dominated the fixtures.

Rugby is amateur in Lithuania. The only professional player to have come out of Lithuania is Karolis Navickas who in 2012 signed for Union Bordeaux Bègles.

== Women's rugby ==
Currently there are women's rugby teams in Klaipėda, Marijampolė and Vilnius. Another two are forming. Rugby sevens is the dominant variant. Although Lithuania's women are yet to play test match rugby, they have been playing international sevens rugby since 2005. (Current playing record).

== Competitions ==
The main national competition is the Lithuanian Rugby Championship, currently disputed by 7 teams in the I Group. They are:

- Vairas-Jupoja Šiauliai
- Baltrex Šiauliai
- RK Šiauliai
- Ąžuolas Kaunas
- Tauras-VRA Vilnius
- Kuršiai Klaipėda
- Stats-Ķekava (from Riga, Latvia)

== See also ==
- Lithuania national rugby union team
- Lithuania national rugby sevens team
- Lithuania women's national rugby sevens team
- Soviet Union national rugby union team
