= Ilirët Rugby Club =

Albanian rugby union club, based in Tirana

Albania
- Full name: Klubi i Regbisë Ilirët
- Union: Rugby union in Albania
- Founded: 9 May 2016; 9 years ago
- Location: Tirana, Albania
- League: Skënderbeu Cup
Team kit

Ilirët Rugby Club (Albanian: Klubi i Regbisë Ilirët) is an Albanian rugby union team based in Tirana. It is named after the ancient tribes of Illyrians which inhabited the region of present-day Albania. The Organization for Security and Co-operation in Europe (OSCE) sponsors the club.
