= Tirana Rugby Club =

Albanian rugby union club, based in Tirana

Albania
- Full name: Tirana Rugby Club
- Union: Albania Rugby Federation
- Nickname(s): Klubi i Regbisë Tirana; KR Tirana; Tirana RC
- Founded: August 2013; 12 years ago
- Location: Tirana, Albania
- Ground: Tirana Olympic Park (Capacity: 1,200)
- Chairman: Former Chairman Xhino Drangu, as off 2023 Mariglen Nezaj
- Coach: Adam Vernon
- Captain: Silvio Çela
- League: Skënderbeu Cup
Team kit

Official website
- www.trc.al

Tirana Rugby Club (Albanian:Klubi Regbisë Tirana) is a rugby union team based in Tirana, Albania. Established in August 2013, it is the first and oldest rugby team in Albania.

== Pre-foundation ==
In 2011, rugby union was promoted as the next major sport in Albania. The first match was held on 4 August 2013, with the participation of Tirana Rugby Club and immigrants from Italy. The promotional event was held at Selman Stërmasi Stadium.

== History ==
The initial team began as “Tirana Lions Rugby Club” and later becoming “Tirana Rugby Club”. The club was formed through the joint effort of; Stiljan Sala, Xhino Drangu, Mariglen Nezaj and Kein Turdiu. It brought rugby to the youth of the capital. The number of players from different schools increased steadily. Xhino Drangu and Adam Vernon worked hard to establish the first steps of the game which then made the recruitment easier. More new players joined the club. Drangu previously studied in the UK where he played rugby in school. He became the first coach in 2013 and later the clubs first President. He helped players start understanding and play genuine rugby.

As years went on, squad became more solid and was able to play friendlies. The first one was played against Kosovo Roosters RC in 2013. In 2014, Adam Vernon became the second coach of the team. He is of English origin and has played rugby in high levels, semi or fully professional. The second friendly was again played against Kosovo Roosters RC in Tirana. In beginning of 2015, club submitted the necessary application to become officially recognized. Registration was made possible and club got the status of a non-profit organization. Same year, along with rugby, club took part at the first cricket game in Albania. This was mediated from members of the British Embassy in Albania and of Crown Agents.

In 2015, club took part in a tournament organized in Pristina with the participation of 3 clubs: Tirana RC (Albania), Kosovo Roosters RC (Kosovo) and Kibubu RC (Belgium). Tirana RC ranked third in the end of the event. Same year two more friendlies were played against RK Podgorica (Montenegro), a very experienced team with many players part of Montenegro National Team. First match was played in Albania and second one in Montenegro and despite the heavy defeats, served as necessary tests and experience for Tirana's young players. As Tirana RC was gaining more experience and connections with other clubs, the plan of a Nationwide Cup was soon materialized. It was named "Skenderbe Cup" and there were only two participants; Tirana RC and Kosovo Roosters RC. It consisted of three matches within a year and the winner of two matches would be the victor. Other Albanian and Kosovan clubs were free to join the event. First match was played on 28 November 2015 and was won by Tirana RC with a score 24–10. A second one was played in Pristina.

In 2016, Tirana RC created a second club, KR Iliret. History was written again on 16 May when for the first time the two first clubs of Albania had their first match. This was played in Elbasan and KR Iliret won 12–0. Match was sponsored by OSCE.

The two teams played two more friendlies, on 30 October 2016 and 9 January 2018.

On 9 April 2016 Tirana RC played a friendly against RK Mornar in Tirana, which was won by the guests. 1st part ended 17-17 and the 2nd 27–36.

On 19 June 2016 Tirana RC participated on the second Cricket Game in Albania.

== Future plans ==
With Tirana RC growing with new members and gaining more experience, club is planning to arrange friendlies with stronger rivals. The main goal of Tirana RC is development of rugby as a new sport in Albania and, as the first and only rugby squad has the obligation to disseminate it further. The other goal is assisting and cooperating on the creation of other rugby teams in the country.

An important step in the establishment of relations with international clubs is twinning with two Italian clubs, Aquila and Gran Sasso. Club is attempting on organizing events and matches in the future.

== Current coaching staff ==
Position	Name
Club president	(Albania) Mariglen Nezaj
Head coach	(Albania) Ilir Lazaj
Team Capiten	(Albania) Olban Llapaj
