= Lithuanian Rugby Federation =

Rigby federation

Lietuvos Regbio Federacija
- Sport: Rugby union
- Founded: 1961; 64 years ago
- World Rugby affiliation: 1993
- Rugby Europe affiliation: 1991
- President: (Lithuania) Rytis Davidovicius
- Men's coach: (South Africa) Ntando Manyosha
- Website: regbis.lt

The Lithuanian Rugby Federation (Lithuanian: Lietuvos Regbio Federacija), abbreviated to LRF is the governing body for the sport of rugby union in Lithuania. Lithuania currently comprises 1,650 registered players and there are 15 club in the whole country.

The Lithuanian national rugby union team currently holds the record for most test match wins in a row (17 matches) along with New Zealand and South Africa.

== History ==
It was formed in 1961, yet was not considered by European rugby authorities and World rugby authorities as a national rugby federation as Lithuania at the time we part of the USSR.

It became affiliated to the International Rugby Football Board, now known as World Rugby, in 1993 and to FIRA Europe, now known as Rugby Europe in 1991 as soon as the USSR collapsed.

== See also ==
- Rugby union in Lithuania
- Lithuania national rugby union team
- Lithuania national rugby sevens team
- Lithuania women's national rugby sevens team
