= Austrian Rugby Federation =

Sports governing body in Austria

Österreichischer Rugby Verband
- Sport: Rugby union
- Founded: 1990
- World Rugby affiliation: 1992
- Rugby Europe affiliation: 1990
- President: Marcus Le Grice
- Men's coach: Gael Mouysset (2007–)
- Women's coach: Rene Carmine Jones
- Sevens coach: (South Africa) Johann Trojer
- Website: https://rugby-austria.at/

The Austrian Rugby Federation (German: Österreichischer Rugby Verband) is the governing body for rugby union in Austria.

The first documented game of rugby played in Austria occurred on April 14, 1912. The sport was being brought to Austria by two Englishmen hoping to expand the sports base. It was over sixty years, however, before rugby union took hold in Austria.

Vienna Celtic RFC was founded in 1978 and was the first rugby union club founded in Austria. The ÖRV was founded in 1990 and joined World Rugby, previously named the International Rugby Board, in 1992.

== List of presidents ==
- Thomas Gabriel (2001–2003)
- Paul Duteil (2003-2007)
- Andreas Schwab (2007-present)

== List of vice presidents ==
- Wolfgang Roehrer (2003-2007)
- Renee Carmine-Jones (2007-present)

== General secretary ==
- Alexandra Langer-Hansel (2003-present)

== National league coordinator ==
- Martin Puchinger (2008-present)

== Women's rugby development officer ==
- Renee Carmine-Jones (2003-present)

== Training and education coordinator ==
- Renee Carmine-Jones (2007-present)

== See also ==
- Rugby union in Austria
- Austria national rugby union team
