= Moldovan Rugby Federation =

Governing body for rugby union in Moldova

Federația de Rugby din Moldova
- Sport: Rugby union
- Founded: 1967; 58 years ago
- World Rugby affiliation: 1994
- Rugby Europe affiliation: 1992
- President: Anatolie Curechi
- Men's coach: Veaceslav Titica
- Website: http://www.rugby.md

The Moldovan Rugby Federation (FRM) (Romanian: Federația de Rugby din Moldova) is the governing body for the sport of rugby union in Moldova. It was found in 1967 and became affiliated to Rugby Europe and World Rugby (Then known as the International Rugby Board) in 1992 and 1994 respectively.

== History ==
Federația de Rugby din Moldova (FRM) the governing body of Rugby Union in Moldova was found in 1967.

Moldova played their first international on October 10, 1991 against Lithuania. Moldova won the match, 22 points to six. The next year they played against Bulgaria, which Moldova won, 42 points to three. Moldova played Hungary in 1995, which they won, by three points, 17 to 14.

They played Georgia, who defeated them 47 to five. They then played Ukraine and Latvia and Bulgaria soon after.

Moldova played twice in 1997, defeating Norway and losing to Croatia. They won a number of fixtures in 2000. They played the Netherlands the following year. The national rugby team was designated by the members of Moldova's Sports Press Association as the best Moldovan team in 2004. Following this, they played in qualifying tournaments for the 2007 Rugby World Cup European qualify.

Moldova were grouped in Pool B of the second round, and they won two of their four matches, which saw them finish second in their pool behind Germany, and thus move onto round three and enter Pool A in round 3.

However, their road to the World Cup was ended when a respectful 2nd place above Poland, Netherlands and Andorra was not enough to proceed to round 4.

== See also ==
- Moldova national rugby union team
- Rugby union in Moldova
