= Baldone =

Town in Ķekava Municipality, Latvia

- Town
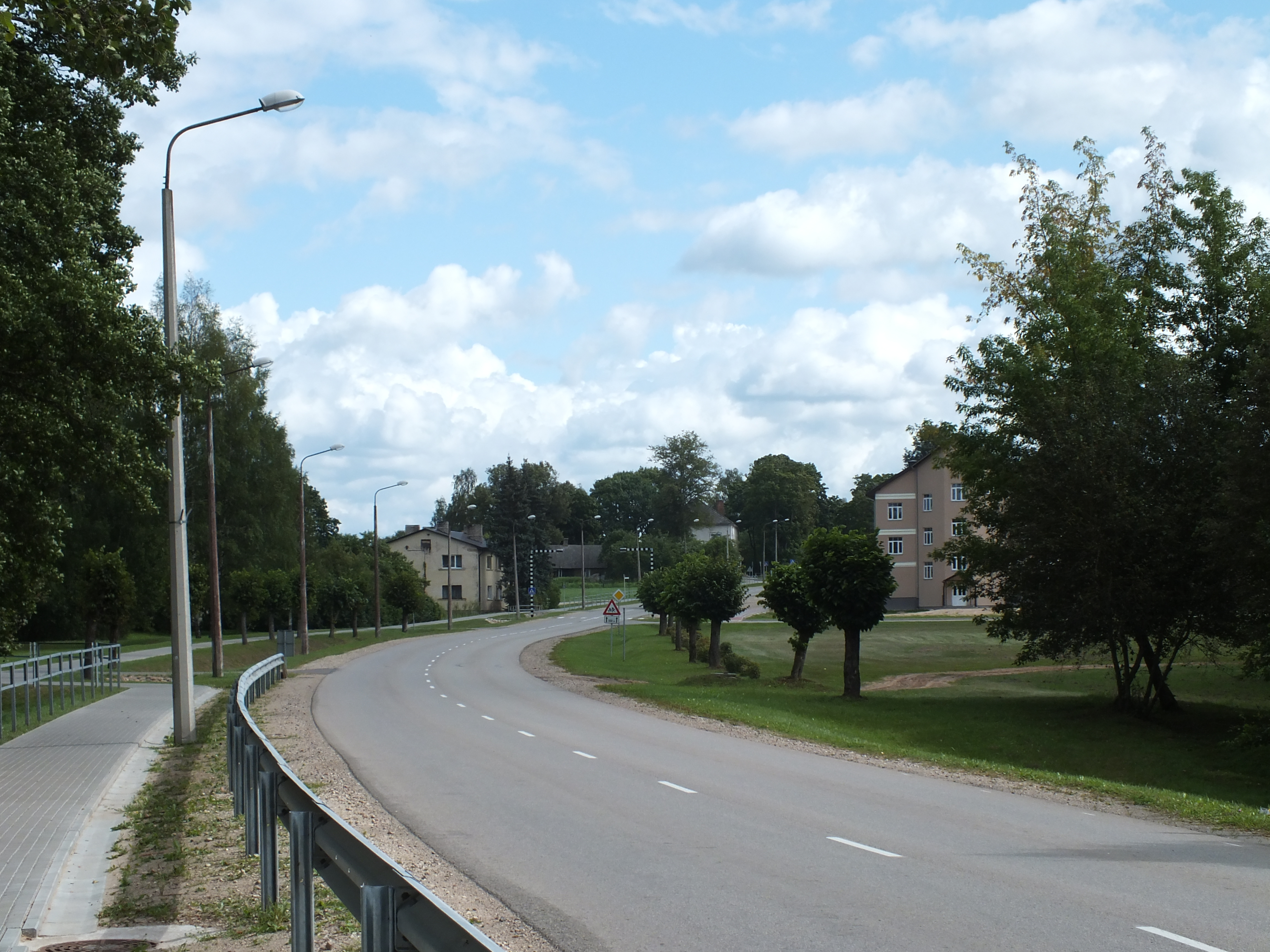
- Riga Street ('Rīgas iela') in Baldone

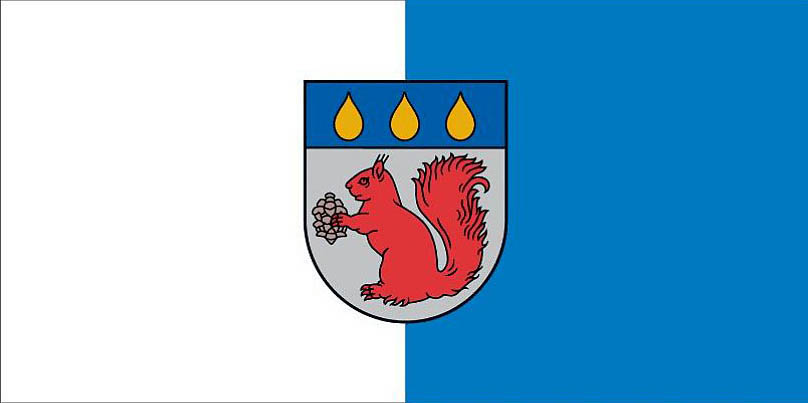
- Flag Coat of arms

- Location in Latvia
- Coordinates: 56°44.5′N 24°23.6′E
- Country: Latvia
- Municipality: Ķekava Municipality
- First mentioned: 1186
- Town rights: 1991

Area
  - Total: 9.52 km^{2} (3.68 sq mi)
  - Land: 9.32 km^{2} (3.60 sq mi)
  - Water: 0.2 km^{2} (0.077 sq mi)

Population (2026)
  - Total: 3,711
  - Density: 398/km^{2} (1,030/sq mi)
- Time zone: UTC+2 (EET)
  - Summer (DST): UTC+3 (EEST)
- Postal code: LV-2125
- Calling code: +371 67
- Number of city council members: 11
- Website: www.baldone.lv

Baldone (German: Baldohn) is a town in Ķekava Municipality, in the Semigallia region of Latvia. The town is famous for its sulfur water springs and was a spa resort. It is connected to the capital Riga by the P91 and P89 roads and the Ķekaviņa river flows through the town.

The town serves as the extra-territorial seat of Baldone Parish, which surrounds the town entirely. From 2008 to 2021, the town served as the seat of Baldone Municipality before its dissolution.

In 1991, the village of Baldone received city rights, governing also the Baldone Rural Territory until 28 January 2010, when it was split off of the town and renamed Baldone Parish.

== Gallery ==
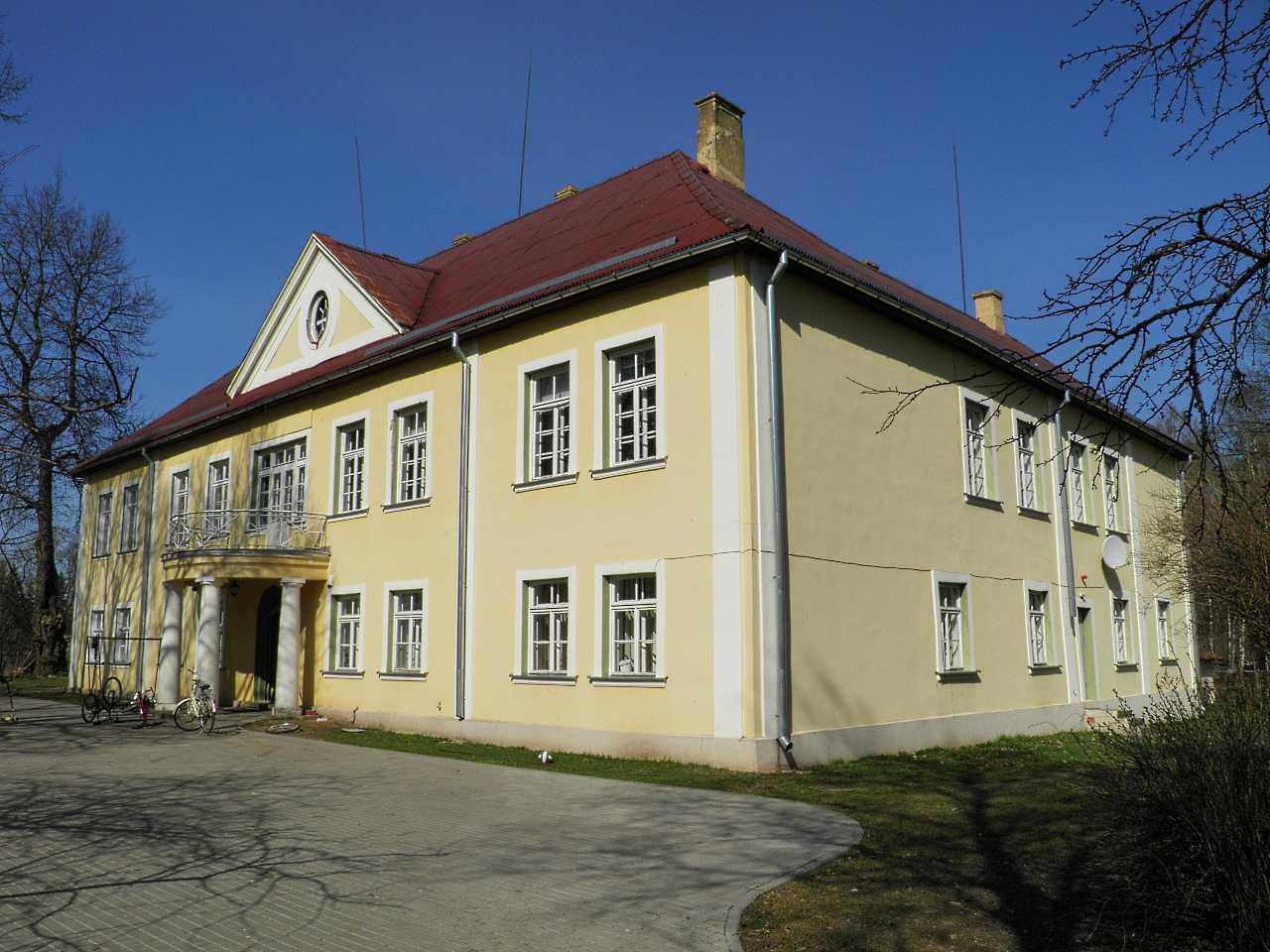
Mercendarbe Manor

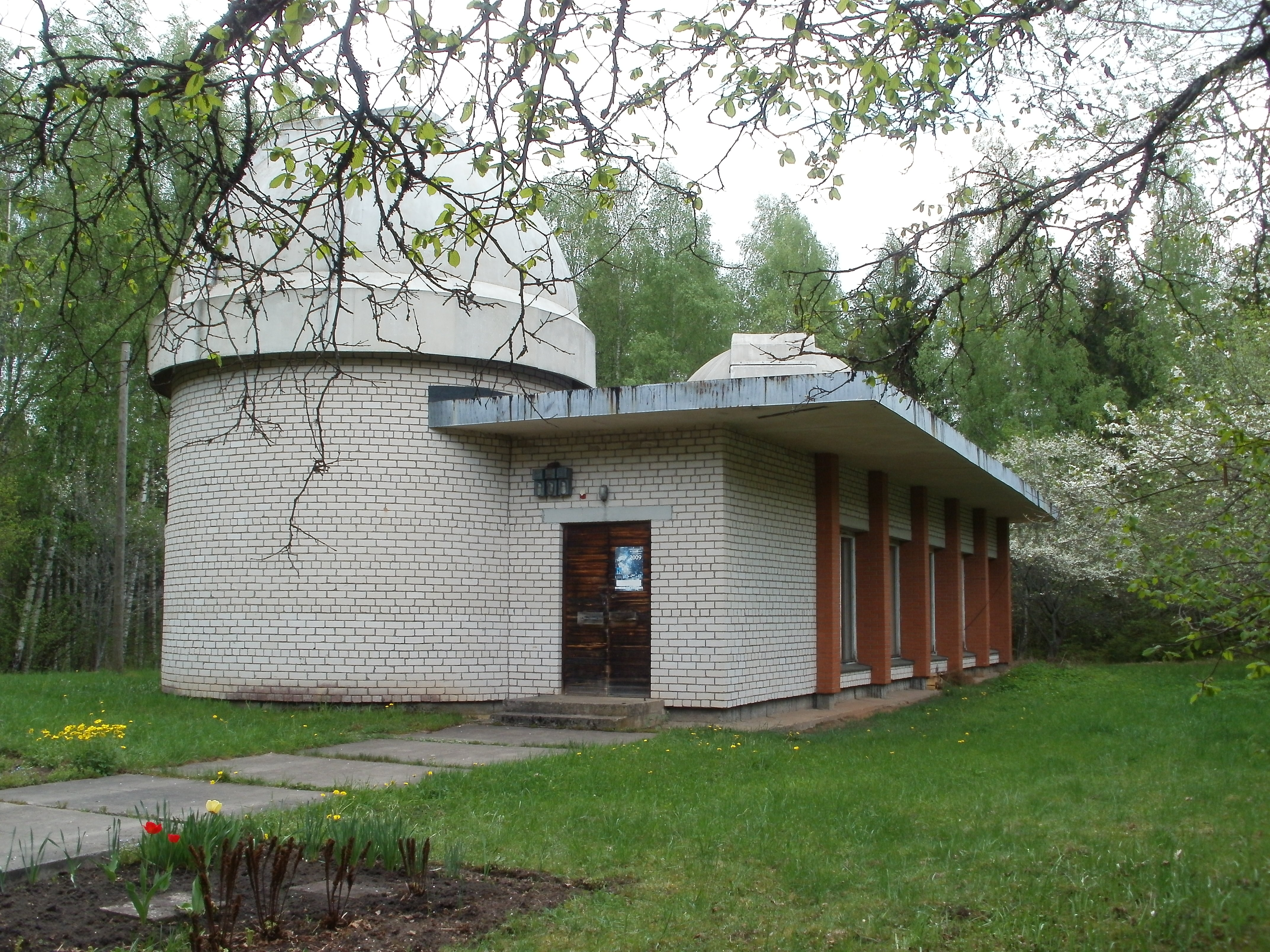
Baldone Observatory

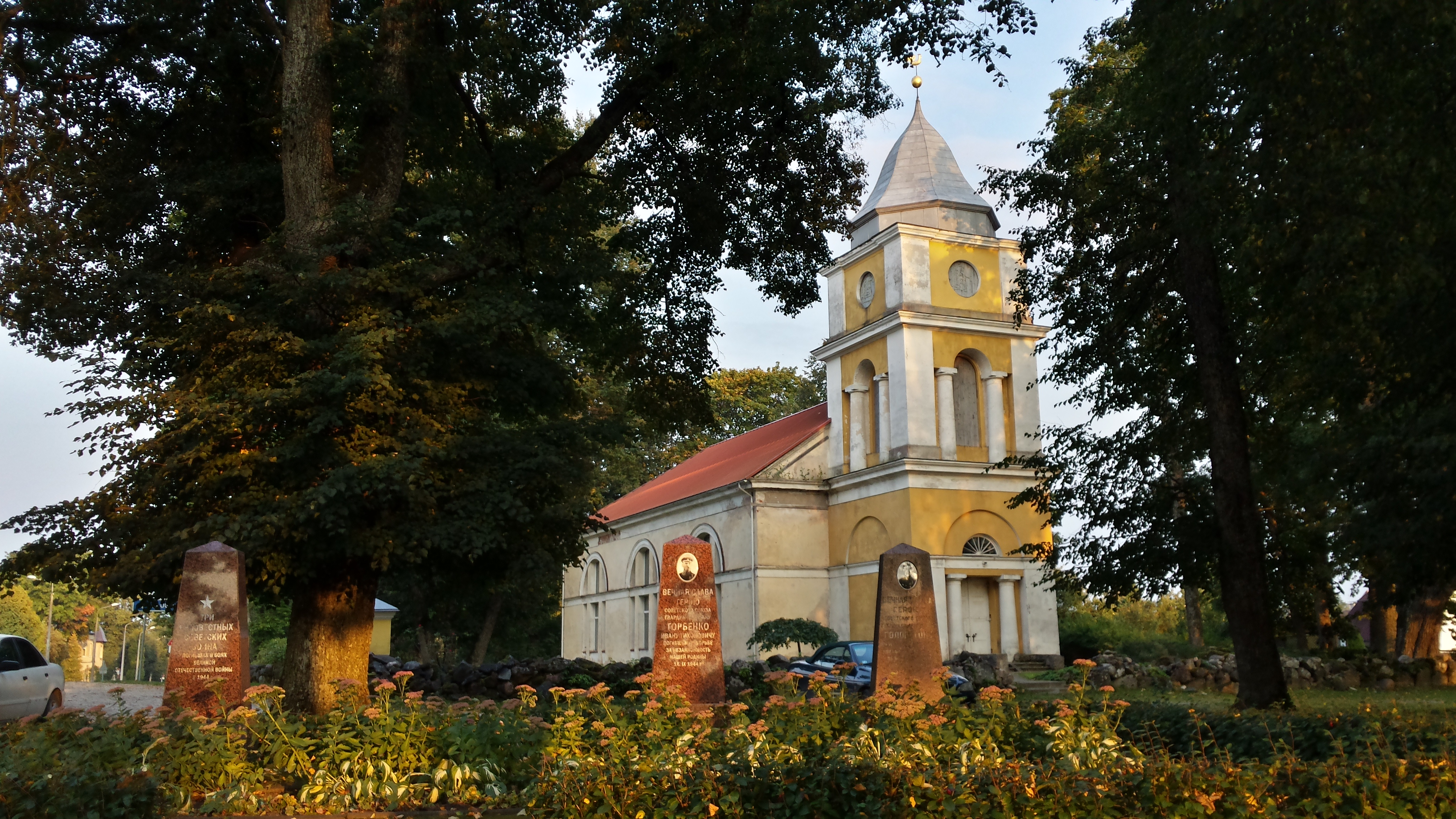
Baldone Lutheran church and the WWII Red Army brothers' cemetery

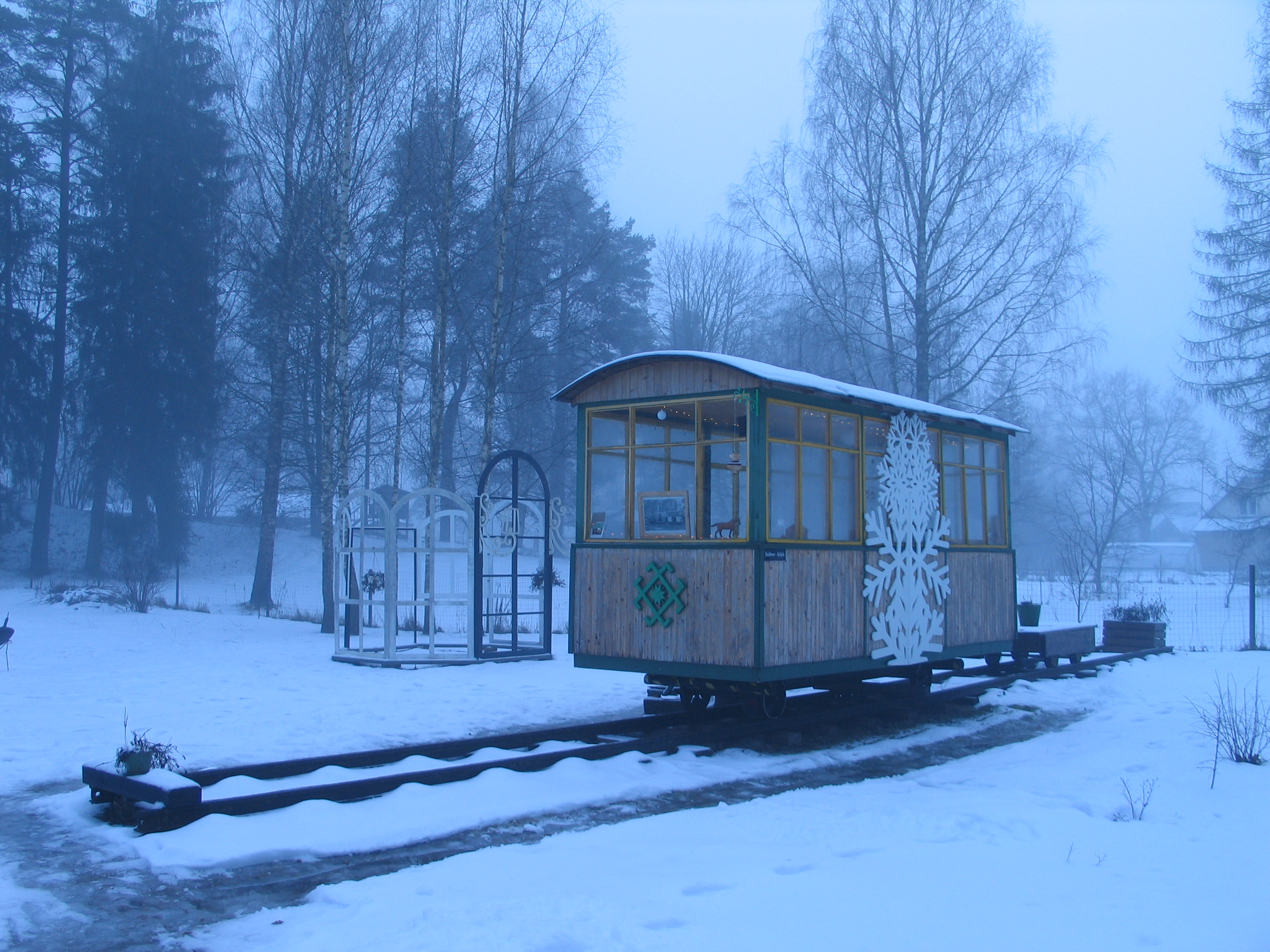
Baldone horse wagon

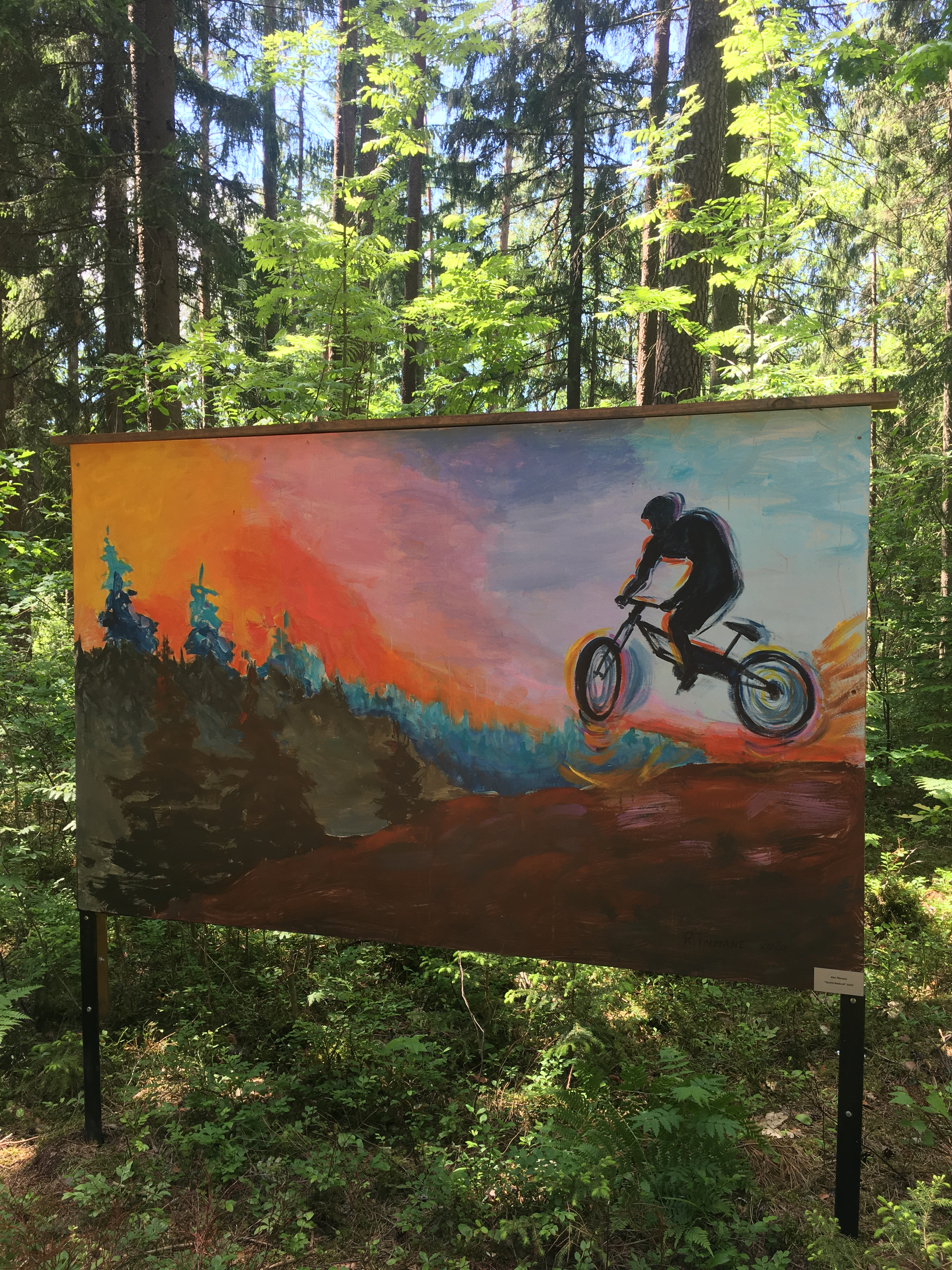
Walking route with paintings in the forest

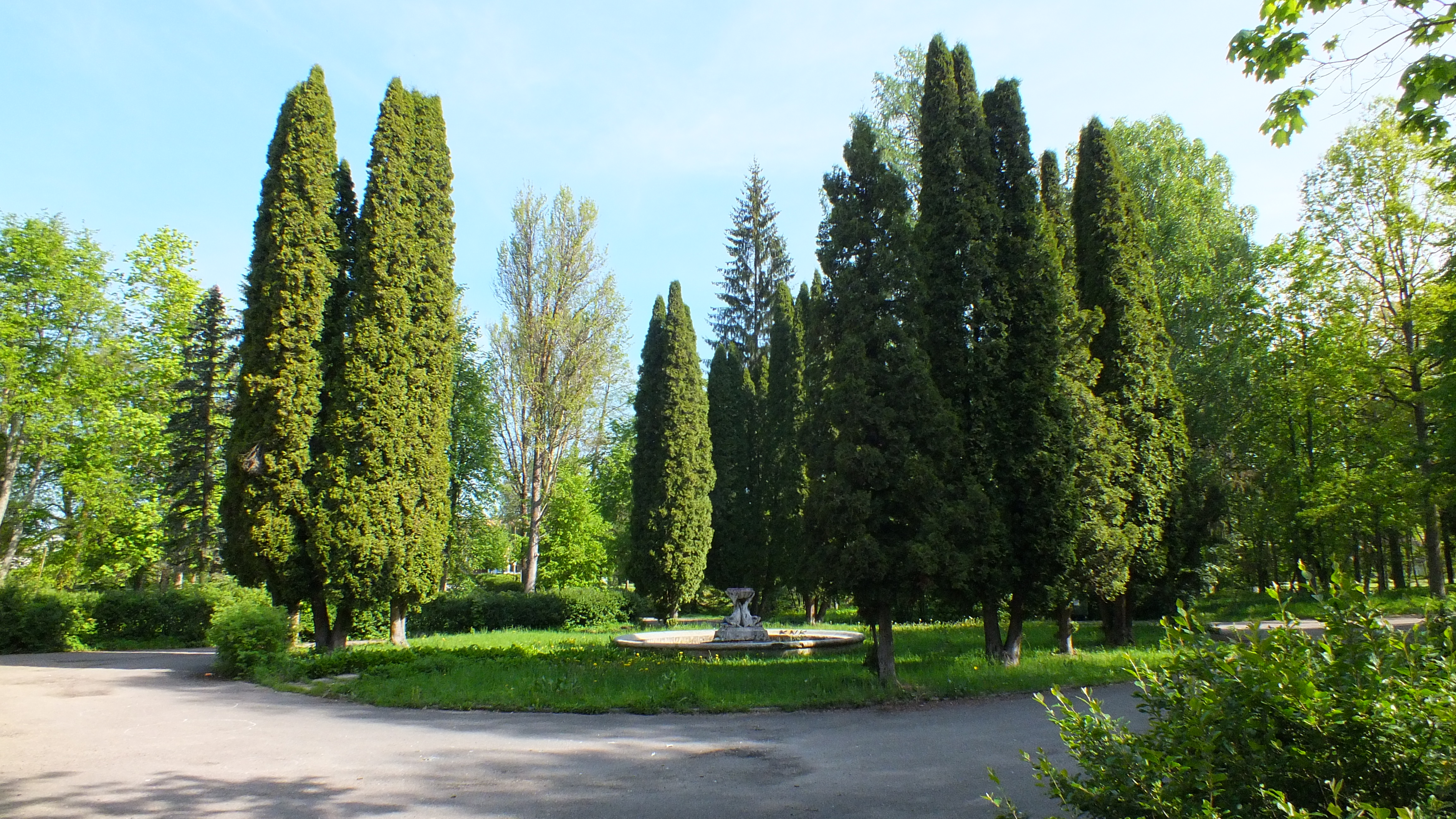
Baldone Sanatorium park

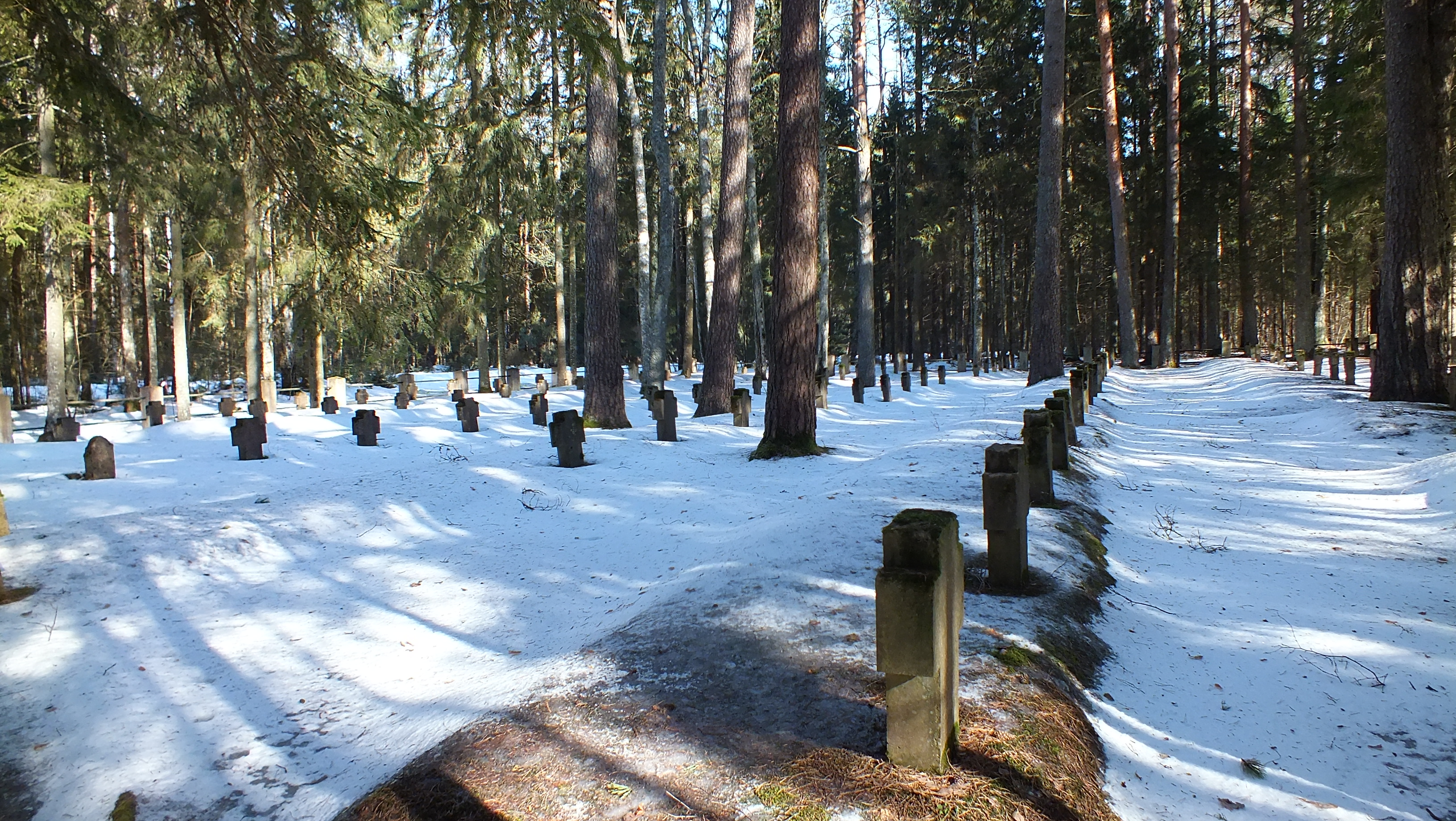
Kannenieki WWII brothers' cemetery

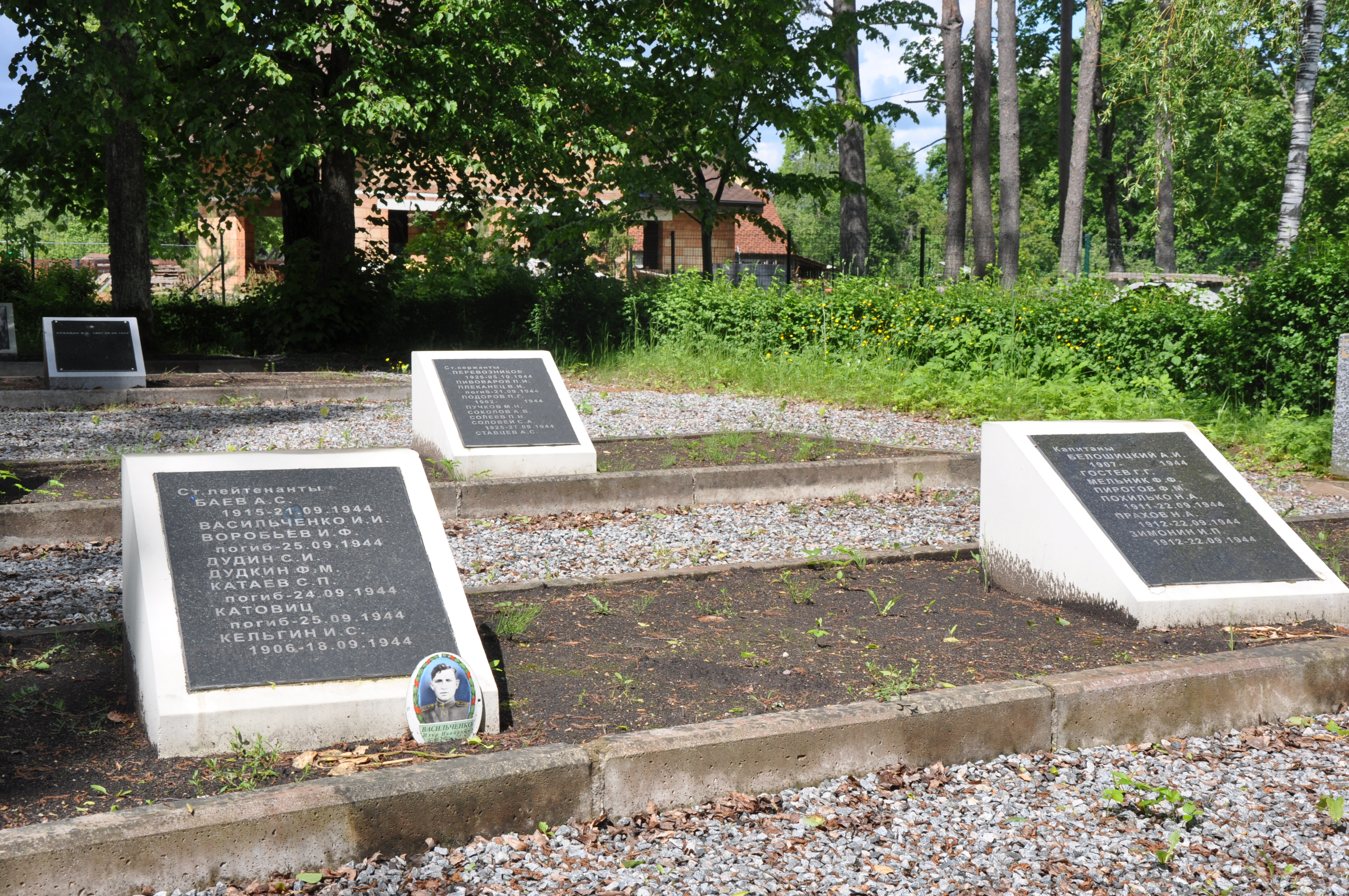
Red Army graves in Mežvidi Brothers' Cemetery

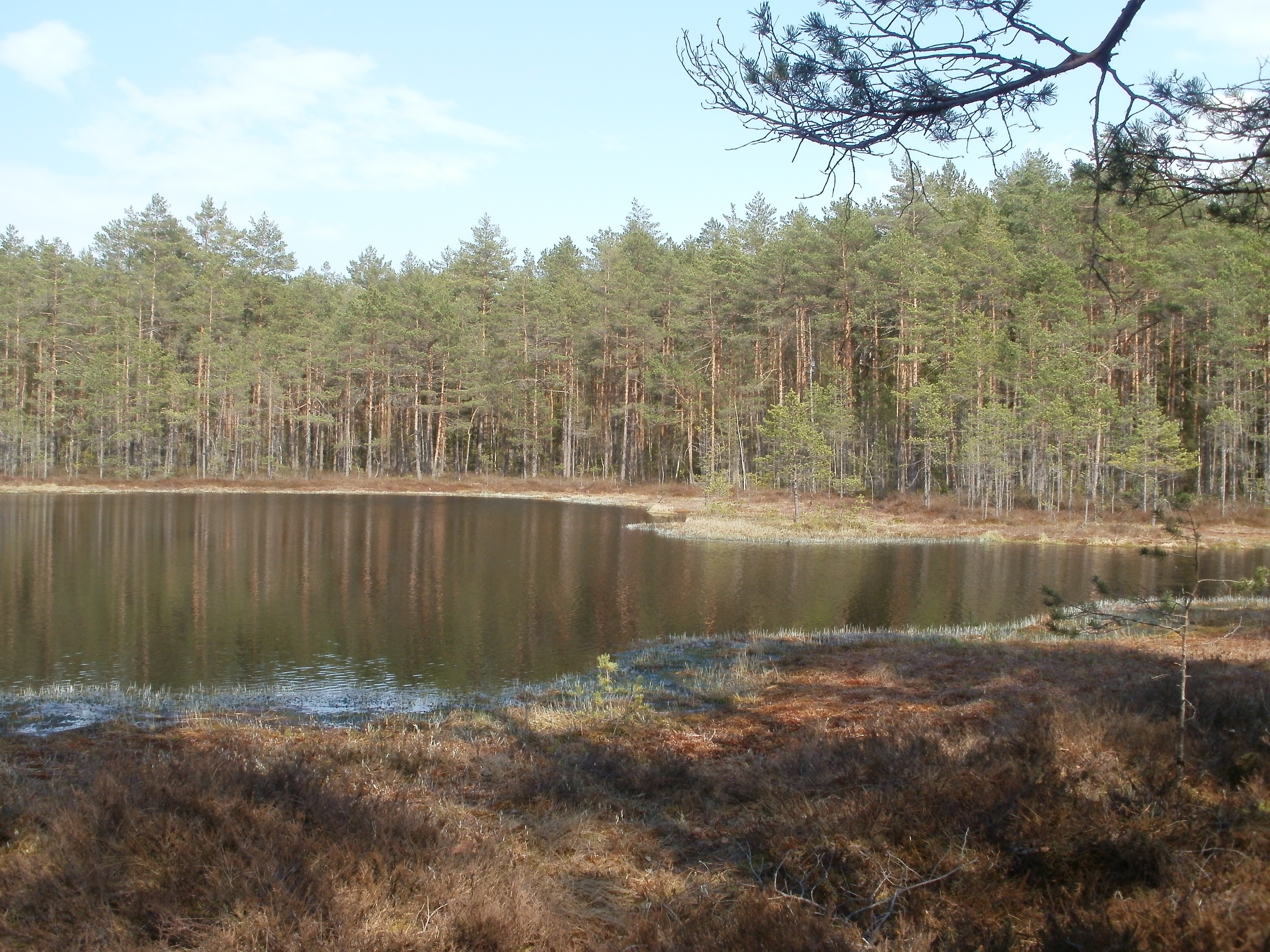
Kausezers

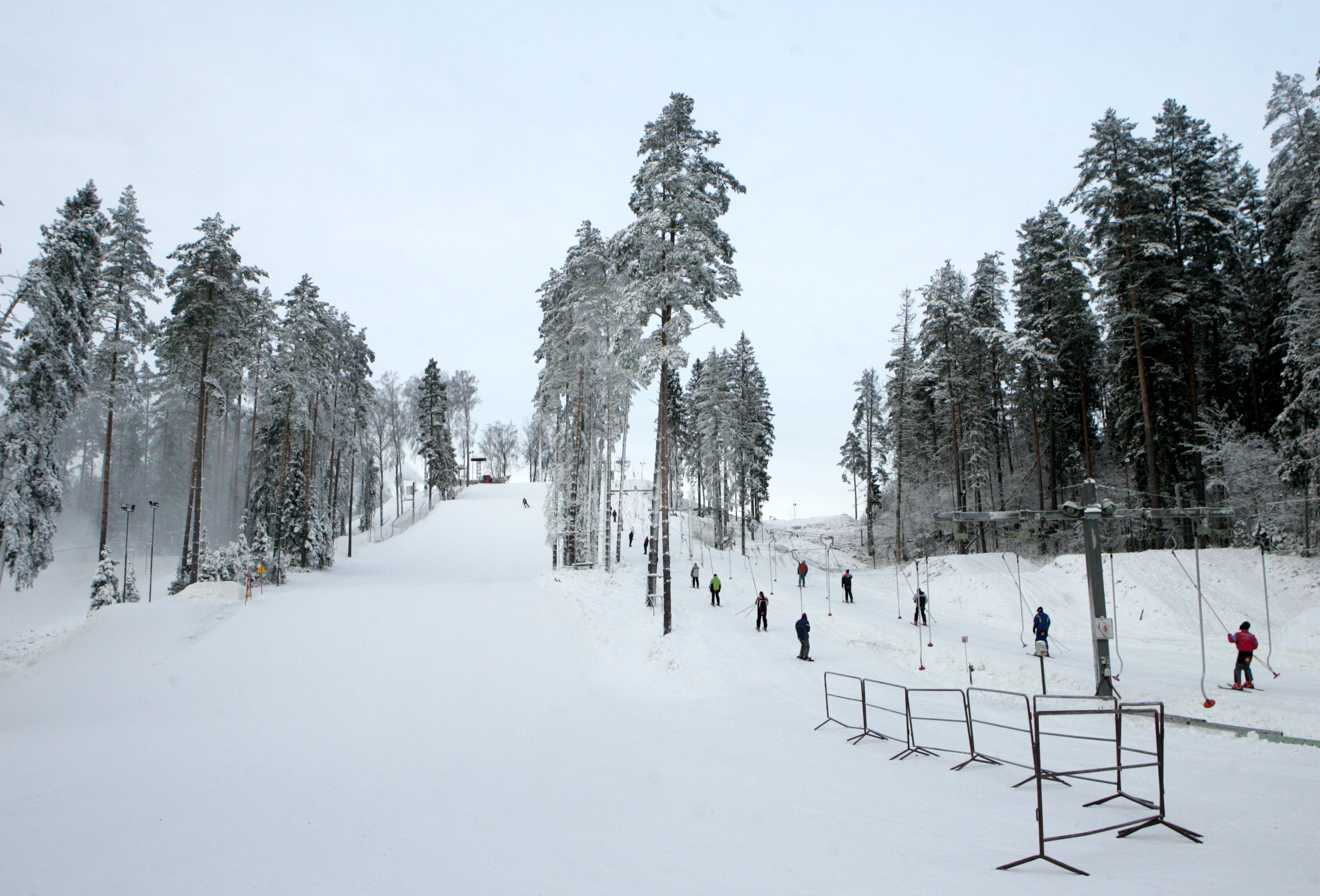
Riekstukalns

== Notable people ==
- Viktors Arājs (born 1910), holocaust perpetrator
- Astra Klovāne (born 1944), chess player
- Zigurds Lanka (born 1960), chess player

== See also ==
- List of cities in Latvia
