= List of rugby clubs in Ukraine =

This is a list of rugby teams in Ukraine, as per the 2011/2012 season.

== Superliga ==
- RC Antares
- RC Argo
- RC Batyari
- RC Epokha-Politekhnik (Kyiv)
- RC Kredo-63
- RC Obolon-University
- RC Olymp
- RC Polytechnic (Odesa)
- RC Roland
- SC Sokil
- RC TEX-A-C
