= 2016–17 Rugby Europe Trophy =

2016-17 Rugby Europe Trophy
- Date: 24 September 2016 – 22 April 2017
- Countries: Moldova; Netherlands; Poland; Portugal; Switzerland; Ukraine

Tournament statistics
- Champions: Portugal (1st title)
- Grand Slam: Portugal (1)
- Matches played: 15
- Attendance: 37,627 (2,508 per match)
- Tries scored: 89 (5.93 per match)
- Top point scorer(s): (Netherlands) David Weersma (52)
- Top try scorer(s): (Netherlands) Sep Visser (6)
- Official website: Rugby International Championship

The 2016–17 Rugby Europe Trophy is the second-level rugby union competition below the premier Championship. It is the inaugural Trophy competition under its new format, that will see Moldova, Netherlands, Poland, Portugal, Switzerland and Ukraine compete for the title, and a place in the Championship-Trophy promotion play-off.

This years competition sees Portugal drop down out of the top six, outside the Rugby Europe Championship, replacing Belgium who earned Promotion to the Championship for 2017.

== Table ==
Champions and advances to
Promotion/relegation play-off
Relegated

Place	Nation	Games				Points			Try BP	Losing BP	Grand Slam BP	Table points
Place	Nation	played	won	drawn	lost	for	against	diff	Try BP	Losing BP	Grand Slam BP	Table points
1	Portugal	5	5	0	0	179	37	+142	4	0	1	25
2	Netherlands	5	3	0	2	159	94	+65	2	1	0	15
3	Switzerland	5	3	0	2	140	122	+18	1	0	0	13
4	Poland	5	3	0	2	73	73	0	0	0	0	12
5	Moldova	5	1	0	4	100	162	–62	1	1	0	6
6	Ukraine	5	0	0	5	52	215	–163	0	0	0	0
Points were awarded to the teams as follows: Win - 4 points Draw - 2 points At least 3 more tries than opponent- 1 point Loss within 8 points - 1 point Loss greater than 8 points - 0 points Completing a Grand Slam - 1 point (will not be counted towards World Cup Qualification)

== Fixtures ==
24 September 2016
19:30 EET (UTC+02)

Poland	22–0	Ukraine
Try: Penalty try 31'; Con: Wojciech Piotrowicz 32'; Pen: Wojciech Piotrowicz (5/5) 3', 11', 37', 50', 70'	Report

Arena Lublin, Lublin
Attendance: 2,500
Referee: Dan Jones (Wales)

FB	15	Mateusz Lament
RW	14	Szymon Sirocki
OC	13	Kewin Bracik	(substituted off) 65'
IC	12	Patryk Reksulak
LW	11	Radoslaw Rakowski
FH	10	Wojciech Piotrowicz
SH	9	Dawid Plichta
N8	8	Michał Mirosz	(substituted off) 63'
OF	7	Aleksander Nowicki
BF	6	Mateusz Bartoszek
RL	5	Paweł Poniatowski
LL	4	Piotr Karpiński	(substituted off) 63'
TP	3	Radosław Bysewski
HK	2	Kamil Bobryk (c)
LP	1	Marcin Wilczuk	36' to 41'		(substituted off) 65'
Replacements:
	16	Łukasz Kujawa
	17	Adrian Chróściel
	18	Stanisław Niedźwiecki	(substituted on) 63'
	19	Piotr Zeszutek
	20	Rafał Janeczko
	21	Daniel Gdula	(substituted on) 63'
	22	Tomasz Gasik	(substituted on) 65'
	25	Sebastian Kacprzak	(substituted on) 36'	(substituted off) 41'	(substituted on) 65'
Coach:
(South Africa) Blikkies Groenewald

FB	15	Denys Masiukov	(substituted off) 70'
RW	14	Ievgen Zalevskyi	(substituted off) 30'
OC	13	Sergii Garkavyi
IC	12	Viachesla Ponomarkeno
LW	11	Oleg Kosariev
FH	10	Sergiy Tserkovniy
SH	9	Maksym Kravchenko	(substituted off) 70'
N8	8	Eduard Vertyletskyi	(substituted off) 64'
OF	7	Valentyn Lytvynenko	(yellow card) 30' to 40'
BF	6	Oleksand Mishynov	(substituted off) 50'
RL	5	Oleksand Tsapenko	(substituted off) 50'
LL	4	Oleksand Lomakin
TP	17	Vitalii Kramarenko	(substituted off) 70'
HK	20	Mykola Kirsanov (c)
LP	3	Mykola Aleksandruik	(substituted off) 55'
Replacements:
	18	Serhii Sukhih	(substituted on) 70'
	1	Konstyan Hurylov	(substituted on) 64'
	16	Ivan Zalizniak	(substituted on) 55'
	2	Dmitriy Mokretsov	(substituted on) 50'
	19	Vitalii Kuznietsov	(substituted on) 50'
	23	Myroslav Shuliak	(substituted on) 70'
	21	Maksym Churaiev	(substituted on) 30'
	22	Volodymy Voitov	(substituted on) 70'
Coach:
(Ukraine) Valerii Kochanov

Touch judges:
Simon Mills (Wales)
Elgan Williams (Wales)

5 November 2016
14:00 EET (UTC+02)

Ukraine	12–54	Netherlands (1 BP)
Try: Roman Kulakivskiy 58'; Valentyn Lytvynenko 78'; Con: Oleg Kosariev 58'	Report	Try: David Weersma 2'; Josh Gascoigne 19', 75'; Dirk Danen 43'; Sep Visser 47', 70'; Rob Verbakel 52'; Con: Liam McBride 2', 19'; David Weersma 52', 70', 75'; Pen: Liam McBride 12'; Davis Weersma 24', 35'

Stadium Lviv, Lviv
Attendance: 1,000
Referee: Paulo Duarte (Portugal)

FB	15	Ihor Snisarenko
RW	14	Ievgen Zalevskyi	(substituted off) 54'
OC	13	Oleg Kosariev
IC	12	Viachesla Ponomarkeno
LW	11	Andrii Shakura
FH	10	Sergii Garkavyi
SH	9	Maksym Kravchenko	(substituted off) 48'
N8	8	Ruslan Radchuck
OF	7	Oleksand Lomakin	(yellow card) 48' to 58'	(substituted off) 72'
BF	6	Valentyn Lytvynenko
RL	5	Oleksand Tsapenko
LL	4	Roman Kulakivskiy	(substituted off) 74'
TP	3	Mykola Aleksandruik	(substituted off) 35'
HK	2	Mykola Kirsanov (c)	(substituted off) 65'
LP	1	Sherii Sukhih	(substituted off) 76'
Replacements:
	16	Ivan Zalizniak	(substituted on) 35'
	22	Sergii Ianchui	(substituted on) 48'
	23	Maksym Kovalevskyi	(substituted on) 54'
	21	Volodymy Voitov
	17	Konstyan Hurylov	(substituted on) 65'
	19	Serhii Cherniachenko	(substituted on) 72'
	20	Vitalii Kuznietsov	(substituted on) 74'
	18	Oleg Lytvynenko	(substituted on) 76'
Coach:
(Ukraine) Valerii Kochanov

FB	15	Liam McBride	(substituted off) 40'
RW	14	Johnny Nas	(substituted off) 66'
OC	13	Josh Gascoigne
IC	12	David Weersma
LW	11	Sep Visser
FH	10	Storm Carroll	(substituted off) 56'
SH	9	Amir Rademaker
N8	8	Vincent Wright	(substituted off) 72'
OF	7	Huey van Vliet	(substituted off) 51'
BF	6	Dirk Danen (c)
RL	5	Chesney Crosby
LL	4	Rob Verbakel
TP	3	Koos de Haan	(substituted off) 51'
HK	2	Mark Darlington	(substituted off) 68'
LP	1	Hugo Langelaan	(substituted off) 71'
Replacements:
	16	Andrew Darlington	(substituted on) 51'
	17	Roberto Waremerdam	(substituted on) 68'
	18	Kieran Hogg	(substituted on) 71'
	19	Bart Jan Romijn	(substituted on) 72'
	20	Robin Kok	(substituted on) 51'
	23	Eric Wijten	(substituted on) 56'
	22	Leon Koenen	(substituted on) 66'
	21	Conrad Van der Klauw	(substituted on) 40'
Coach:
(South Africa) Gareth Gilbert

Touch judges:
P. Mendes Silva (Portugal)
J. Costa (Portugal)

12 November 2016
13:10 EET (UTC+02)

(1 BP) Moldova	54–15	Ukraine
Try: Maxim Gargallic, 11'; Oleg Prepelitta, 16', 34', 70'; Veaceslav Titica, 25', 44'; Victor Arhip, 50'; Ion Cavcaliuc, 77'; Con: Mihai Golubenco 12', 17', 26', 35', 45', 51'; Alexandru Ungureaunu, 78'	Report	Try: Oleg Kosariev, 64'; Oleg Lytvynenko 80'; Con: Oleg Kosariev, 65'; Pen: Oleg Kosariev, 55'

Stadionul Central, Bălți
Attendance: 500
Referee: Laurent Cardona (France)

FB	15	Illie Lotca
RW	11	Andrei Cibotari
OC	13	Victor Arhip
IC	12	Ion Cavcaliuc
LW	14	Grigore Lotca
FH	10	Mihai Golubenco	(substituted off) 62'
SH	9	Alexandru Ungureanu
N8	6	Maxim Gargalic
OF	8	Oleg Prepelita
BF	7	Veaceslav Titica (c)	(substituted off) 75'
RL	4	Andrei Mahu
LL	5	Andrei Romanov	(substituted off) 75'
TP	3	Gheorghe Gajon
HK	2	Igor Orgheanu	(substituted off) 65'
LP	1	Maxim Cobîlaş	65' to 68'
Replacements:
	17	Christian Ojovan
	16	Ruslan Dorogan	(substituted on) 65'
	18	Ion Busila
	19	Sergiu Castravet	(substituted on) 75'
	20	Andrei Lungu	(substituted on) 65'	(substituted off) 68'
	21	Vadim Preguza
	22	Mihai Diacon	(substituted on) 62'
	23	Mihai Artic	(substituted on) 75'
Coach:
Sergiu Motoc

FB	15	Ihor Snisarenko
RW	14	Ievgen Zalevskyi	(substituted off) 40'
OC	13	Oleg Kosariev
IC	12	Viacheslav Ponomarenko
LW	11	Maksym Kravchenko	(yellow card) 22' to 32'	(substituted off) 75'
FH	10	Volodymy Voitov
SH	9	Sergii Ianchui
N8	8	Ruslan Radchuk
OF	7	Valentyn Lytvynenko
BF	6	Serhii Cherniachenko
RL	5	Oleksand Tsapenko
LL	4	Oleksand Lomakin
TP	3	Mykola Aleksandruik	(substituted off) 71'
HK	2	Mykola Kirsanov (c)	(substituted off) 71'
LP	1	Serhii Sukhih	(substituted off) 52'
Replacements:
	16	Ivan Zalizniak	(substituted on) 71'
	17	Konstyan Hurylov	(substituted on) 71'
	18	Vadym Milanko	(substituted off) 79'
	19	Oleg Lytvynenko	(substituted on) 52'
	20	Vitalii Kuznietsov
	21	Andrii Shakura	(substituted on) 40'
	22	Petro Kobylianskyi	(substituted on) 79'
	23	Maksym Kovalevskyi	(substituted on) 75'
Coach:
(Ukraine) Valerii Kochanov

Touch judges:
Adrien Descottes (France)
Thierry Guilloton (France)

19 November 2016
15:00 CET (UTC+01)

(1 BP) Netherlands	44–17	Moldova
Try: Rik Roovers 8'; Dirk Danen 11', 27'; Sep Visser 18'; Josh Gascoigne 34', 70'; Mark Darlington 46'; Con: David Weersma 9', 12', 46'; Pen: David Weersma 6'	Report	Try: Maxim Gargalic 16', 76'; Victor Arhip 32'; Con: Mihai Golubenco 32'

NRCA Stadium, Amsterdam
Attendance: 3,215
Referee: Sam Grove-White (Scotland)

FB	15	Josh Gascoigne	(substituted off) 74'
RW	14	Johnny Nas	(substituted off) 72'
OC	22	Rik Roovers
IC	12	David Weersma
LW	11	Sep Visser
FH	10	Storm Carroll
SH	9	Amir Rademaker	(substituted off) 62'
N8	8	Vincent Wright	(substituted off) 62'
OF	7	Huey van Vliet	(substituted off) 40'
BF	6	Dirk Danen
RL	5	Chesney Crosby
LL	4	Rob Verbakel
TP	16	Andrew Darlington	(substituted off) 62'
HK	2	Mark Darlington	(substituted off) 62'
LP	1	Hugo Langelaan	(substituted off) 72'
Replacements:
	18	Floris Kieft	(substituted on) 62'
	17	Roberto Waremerdam	(substituted on) 62'
	3	Koos De Haan	(substituted on) 72'
	19	Bart Jan Romijn	(substituted on) 62'
	20	Robin Kok	(substituted on) 40'
	21	Rik van Balkom	(substituted on) 62'
	13	Sepp Kotten	(substituted on) 72'
	23	Leon Koenen	(substituted on) 74'
Coach:
(South Africa) Gareth Gilbert

FB	15	Illie Lotca	(substituted off) 72'
RW	14	Andrei Cibotari	(substituted off) 64'
OC	13	Victor Arhip
IC	12	Ion Cavcaliuc
LW	11	Grigore Lotca
FH	10	Mihai Golubenco
SH	9	Alexandru Ungureanu	(substituted off) 72'
N8	8	Maxim Gargalic
OF	7	Oleg Prepelita	(substituted off) 64'
BF	6	Veaceslav Titica
RL	5	Andrei Mahu	(substituted off) 67'
LL	4	Andrei Romanov
TP	3	Gheorghe Gajon	(substituted off) 47'
HK	2	Igor Orgheanu
LP	1	Ruslan Dorogan
Replacements:
	16	Christian Ojovan	(substituted on) 47'
	17
	18	Ion Busila	(substituted on) 67'
	19	Sergiu Castravet	(substituted on) 64'
	20	Andrei Lungu
	21	Vadim Preguza	(substituted on) 72'
	22	Mihai Diacon	(substituted on) 72'
	23	Mihai Artic	(substituted on) 64'
Coach:
Sergiu Motoc

Touch judges:
Finlay Brown (Scotland)
Neil Muir (Scotland)

19 November 2016
15:00 CET (UTC+01)

Switzerland	10–28	Portugal
Try: Penalty Try 51'; Con: Simon Perrod 52'; Pen: Simon Perrod 6'	Report	Try: Francisco Bruno 1'; Vasco Ribeiro 65'; Nuno Guedes 70'; Con: Nuno Guedes 2', 70'; Pen: Nuno Guedes 33', 54', 61'

Yverdon
Attendance: 2,057
Referee: Emanuele Tomo (Italy)

FB	15	Thibault Grey
RW	14	Ludovic Porret	(substituted off) 16'
OC	13	Ghislain Montiel
IC	12	Benjamin Doy
LW	11	Florian Escoffier	(substituted off) 72'
FH	10	Sebastien Dimitri	(substituted off) 48'
SH	9	Simon Perrod
N8	8	Cyril Lin (c)
OF	7	Ludovic Pommies	(substituted off) 67'
BF	6	Jonathan Wullschleger
RL	5	Nicolas Guyou
LL	4	Mathias Bernath-Yendt	(substituted off) 67'
TP	3	Clement Bartschi	(substituted off) 62'
HK	2	Mathieu Paul	(substituted off) 72'
LP	1	Cyril Lafuye	(substituted off) 72'
Replacements:
	16	Ashley Cumbers	(substituted on) 62'
	17	Manu Ronza	(substituted on) 72'
	18	Benjamin Moritz	(substituted on) 72'
	19	Alexandre Coullon	(substituted on) 67'
	20	Cedric Curdy	(substituted on) 67'
	21	Lucas Heinrich	(substituted on) 16'
	22	Sylvain Hirsch	(substituted on) 72'
	23	Erwan Meudic	(substituted on) 48'
Coach:
(France) Olivier Nier

FB	15	Nuno Guedes
RW	14	José Vareta
OC	13	Tomás Appleton
IC	12	Manuel Vilela	(substituted off) 62'
LW	11	Gonçalo Foro	(substituted off) 68'
FH	10	Nuno Costa
SH	9	Francisco Pinto Magalhães (c)	(substituted off) 67'
N8	8	Vasco Mendes
OF	7	Sebastião Villax	(substituted off) 51'
BF	6	João Lino
RL	5	Gonçalo Uva
LL	4	Fernando Almeida	(yellow card) 50' to 60'	(substituted off) 62'
TP	3	Francisco Bruno	(substituted off) 59'
HK	2	Duarte Diniz	(substituted off) 67'
LP	1	Bruno Medeiros	(substituted off) 51'
Replacements:
	16	João Corte-Real	(substituted on) 51'
	17	Duarte Foro	(substituted on) 67'
	18	José Conde	(substituted on) 59'
	19	Máxime Vaz	(substituted on) 62'
	20	Miguel Macedo	(substituted on) 51'
	21	Pedro Leal	(substituted on) 67'
	22	Vasco Ribeiro	(substituted on) 62'
	23	Pedro Silvério	(substituted on) 68'
Coach:
(Scotland) Ian Smith

Touch judges:
Manuel Bottino (Italy)
Yves Bressy (France)

26 November 2016
15:00 CET (UTC+01)

Switzerland	29–26	Moldova (1 BP)
Try: Florian Escoffier 47'; Jeremy To'a 70'; Con: Simon Perrod 47', 70'; Pen: Simon Perrod 7', 31', 58', 64', 84'	Report	Try: Andrei Romanov 25'; Victor Arhip 37'; Oleg Prepelita 79'; Cristian Ojovan 86'; Con: Mihai Golubenco 37', 79', 86'

Yverdon
Attendance: 1,030
Referee: Frank Himmer (Germany)

FB	15	Thibault Grey
RW	14	Sylvain Hirsch	(substituted off) 55'
OC	13	Ghislain Montiel	(substituted off) 73'
IC	12	Jeremy To'a	(substituted off) 84'
LW	11	Florian Escoffier
FH	10	Benjamin Doy
SH	9	Simon Perrod
N8	8	Cyril Lin (c)
OF	7	Ludovic Pommies	(substituted off) 84'
BF	6	Jonathan Wullschleger
RL	5	Nicolas Guyou
LL	4	Mathias Bernath-Yendt	(substituted off) 80'
TP	3	Clement Bartschi	(substituted off) 78'
HK	2	Mathieu Paul	(substituted off) 33'
LP	1	Benjamin Schaerer	(substituted off) 73'
Replacements:
	16	Dorian Hustaix	(substituted on) 73'
	17	Maxime Lucon	(substituted on) 33'
	18	Benjamin Moritz	(substituted on) 78'
	19	Tim Vogtli	(substituted on) 80'
	20	Cedric Curdy	(substituted on) 84'
	21	Gaetan Hirsch	(substituted on) 84'
	22	Lucas Heinrich	(substituted on) 55'
	23	Erwan Meudic	(substituted on) 73'
Coach:
(France) Olivier Nier

FB	15	Illie Lotca	(substituted off) 53'
RW	11	Andrei Cibotari	(substituted off) 70'
OC	13	Victor Arhip
IC	12	Ion Cavcaliuc
LW	14	Vasile Buzgan
FH	10	Mihai Golubenco
SH	9	Alexandru Ungureanu	(yellow card) 64' to 74'
N8	6	Maxim Gargalic (c)
OF	8	Oleg Prepelita
BF	7	Veaceslav Titica	(substituted off) 70'
RL	4	Andrei Mahu
LL	5	Andrei Romanov	(substituted off) 80'
TP	3	Cristian Ojovan
HK	1	Igor Orgheanu
LP	2	Ruslan Dorogan	(substituted off) 50'
Replacements:
	17	Mihai Boian	(substituted on) 80'
	16	Ion Dascal
	18	Ion Busila
	19	Sergiu Castravet	(substituted on) 70'
	20	Andrei Lungu	(substituted on) 50'
	23	Grigore Lotca
	22	Mihai Diacon	(substituted on) 70'
	21	Mihai Artic	(substituted on) 53'
Coach:
Sergiu Motoc

Touch judges:
Daniel Maughan (Germany)
Joshua Jahn (Germany)

18 February 2017
14:00 WET (UTC+00)

(1 BP) Portugal	35–10	Poland
Try: Nuno Sousa Guedes 13'; Manuel Picão 16'; Tomás Appleton 23'; Francisco Domingues 64'; Vasco Fragoso Mendes 80'; Con: Nuno Sousa Guedes (5/5) 14', 17', 24', 64', 80'; Pen: Nuno Sousa Guedes (0/1)	Report	Try: Toma Mchedlidze 34'; Con: Wojciech Piotrowicz (1/1) 35'; Pen: Wojciech Piotrowicz (1/2) 2'; Radoslaw Rakowski (0/1)

CAR Rugby do Jamor, Lisbon
Attendance: 2,000
Referee: Sam Grove-White (Scotland)

FB	15	Nuno Sousa Guedes
RW	14	Pedro Silvério	(substituted off) 62'
OC	13	Tomás Appleton
IC	12	José Lima
LW	11	Adérito Esteves
FH	10	Nuno Penha e Costa
SH	9	Francisco Pinto Magalhães (c)	(substituted off) 68'
N8	8	Vasco Fragoso Mendes
OF	7	Sebastião Villax	(substituted off) 52'
BF	6	Manuel Picão	(substituted off) 62'
RL	5	José Fino
LL	4	Gonçalo Uva	(substituted off) 68'
TP	3	Francisco Bruno	(substituted off) 72'
HK	2	Duarte Diniz	(substituted off) 68'
LP	1	Bruno Medeiros	(substituted off) 52'
Replacements:
	16	Francisco Domingues	(substituted on) 52'
	17	João Corte-Real	(substituted on) 68'
	18	José Leal da Costa	(substituted on) 72'
	19	Rui D'Orey	(substituted on) 68'
	20	João Lino	(substituted on) 62'
	21	Miguel Macedo	(substituted on) 52'
	22	Pedro Leal	(substituted on) 68'
	23	Vasco Ribeiro	(substituted on) 62'
Coach:
(Portugal) Martim Aguiar

FB	15	Mateusz Lament	(substituted off) 47'
RW	14	Szymon Sirocki
OC	13	Patryk Reksulak
IC	12	Daniel Gdula
LW	11	Radoslaw Rakowski
FH	10	Wojciech Piotrowicz
SH	9	Dawid Plichta	(substituted off) 79'
N8	8	Piotr Zeszutek
OF	7	Aleksander Nowicki
BF	6	Mateusz Bartoszek
RL	5	Stanisław Powała-Niedźwiecki	(substituted off) 45'
LL	4	Piotr Karpiński II
TP	3	Toma Mchedlidze	(substituted off) 51'
HK	2	Kamil Bobryk (c)
LP	1	Marcin Wilczuk	(substituted off) 55'
Replacements:
	16	Łukasz Kujawa
	17	Sebastian Kacprzak	(substituted on) 55'
	18	Radosław Bysewski	(substituted on) 51'
	19	Adrian Ignakzak
	20	Marek Płonka Jr	(substituted on) 45'
	21	Mateusz Plichta	(substituted on) 79'
	22	Andrzej Charlat	(substituted on) 47'
	23	Tomasz Rokicki
Coach:
(South Africa) Blikkies Groenewald

Touch judges:
David Sutherland (Scotland)
Steven Turnbull (Scotland)

4 March 2017
15:00 CET (UTC+01)

Netherlands	10–26	Portugal (1 BP)
Try: Sep Visser 3'; Con: Liam McBride (1/1) 4'; Pen: David Weersma (1/1) 39'	Report	Try: Fernando Almeida 17', 53'; Vasco Ribeiro 57'; Gonçalo Uva 73'; Con: Nuno Penha e Costa (3/4) 54' 58' 74'

NRCA Stadium, Amsterdam
Attendance: 3,500
Referee: Giuseppe Vivarini (Italy)

FB	15	Liam McBride	(substituted off) 22'
RW	14	Johnny Nas	(substituted off) 58'
OC	13	Josh Gascoigne
IC	12	David Weersma
LW	11	Sep Visser
FH	10	Storm Carroll
SH	9	Rik Roovers (c)
N8	8	Vincent Wright
OF	7	Huey van Vliet	(substituted off) 58'
BF	6	Dirk Danen	(substituted off) 58'
RL	5	Chesney Crosby	(substituted off) 52'
LL	4	Rob Verbakel
TP	16	Andrew Darlington	(substituted off) 76'	(substituted on) 80'
HK	2	Mark Darlington	(substituted off) 76'
LP	1	Hugo Langelaan	(substituted off) 65'
Replacements:
	3	Floris Kieft	(substituted on) 65'	(substituted off) 80'
	17	Victor Huurman	(substituted on) 76'
	18	Roberto Warmerdam	(substituted on) 76'
	19	Robin Kok	(substituted on) 58'
	20	Vincent Grimbergen	(substituted on) 52'
	21	Niels van de Ven	(substituted on) 58'
	22	Rik van Balkom	(substituted on) 22'
	23	Pieter Mol	(substituted on) 58'
Coach:
(South Africa) Gareth Gilbert

FB	15	Manuel Vilela
RW	14	Gonçalo Foro	(substituted off) 77'
OC	13	Tomás Appleton
IC	12	Vasco Ribeiro
LW	11	Adérito Esteves	(substituted off) 77'
FH	10	Nuno Penha e Costa
SH	9	Francisco Pinto Magalhães (c)	(substituted off) 70'
N8	8	Vasco Fragoso Mendes
OF	7	Sebastião Villax	(substituted off) 65'
BF	6	João Lino
RL	5	Gonçalo Uva
LL	4	Fernando Almeida	(substituted off) 60'
TP	3	Francisco Bruno	(substituted off) 70'
HK	2	Duarte Diniz	(substituted off) 77'
LP	1	João Corte-Real	(substituted off) 40'
Replacements:
	16	Bruno Medeiros	(substituted on) 40'
	17	Nuno Mascarenhas	(substituted on) 77'
	18	José Leal da Costa	(substituted on) 70'
	19	Manuel Picão	(substituted on) 60'
	20	Miguel Macedo	(substituted on) 65'
	21	Pedro Leal	(substituted on) 70'
	22	Tiago Fernandes	(substituted on) 77'
	23	António Vidinha	(substituted on) 77'
Coach:
(Portugal) Martim Aguiar

Touch judges:
Alan Falzone (Italy)
Andrea Spadoni (Italy)

11 March 2017
14:00 WET (UTC+00)

(1 BP) Portugal	59–0	Moldova
Try: Gonçalo Foro 2'; Nuno Penha e Costa 18', 34'; Francisco Pinto Magalhães 40'; Manuel Vilela 51'; Afonso Rodrigues 60'; Sebastião Villax 64'; Vasco Ribeiro 73'; Nuno Mascarenhas 79'; Con: Nuno Penha e Costa 3', 19', 35', 40'; Pedro Leal 61', 65', 74'	Report

CAR Rugby do Jamor, Lisbon
Attendance: 1,400
Referee: Stuart Gaffikin (Ireland)

FB	15	Manuel Vilela	(substituted off) 53'
RW	14	Gonçalo Foro
OC	13	Tomás Appleton	(substituted off) 46'
IC	12	Vasco Ribeiro
LW	11	Adérito Esteves
FH	10	Nuno Penha e Costa
SH	9	Francisco Pinto Magalhães (c)	(substituted off) 46'
N8	8	Vasco Fragoso Mendes	(yellow card) 30' to 40'
OF	7	Miguel Macedo
BF	6	João Lino	(substituted off) 53'
RL	5	Gonçalo Uva	(substituted off) 49'
LL	4	Fernando Almeida
TP	3	José Leal da Costa	(substituted off) 44'
HK	2	Duarte Diniz	(substituted off) 53'
LP	1	Bruno Medeiros	(substituted off) 49'
Replacements:
	16	João Corte-Real	(substituted on) 49'
	17	Nuno Mascarenhas	(substituted on) 53'
	18	Francisco Bruno	(substituted on) 44'
	19	Manuel Picão	(substituted on) 49'
	20	Sebastião Villax	(substituted on) 53'	(yellow card) 75' to 80'
	21	Pedro Leal	(substituted on) 46'
	22	António Vidinha	(substituted on) 46'
	23	Afonso Rodrigues	(substituted on) 53'
Coach:
(Portugal) Martim Aguiar

FB	15	Dorin Petrache	37' to 40'
RW	14	Vasili Buzgan
OC	13	Mihail Boian
IC	12	Ion Cavcaliuc	(substituted off) 37'
LW	11	Andrei Cibotari
FH	10	Craig Felston	(substituted off) 61'
SH	9	Vadim Preguza	(substituted off) 15'
N8	8	Sergiu Castravet	(substituted off) 64'
OF	7	Veaceslav Titica (c)
BF	18	Ion Busila
RL	5	Andrei Romanov
LL	4	Andrei Mahu	(yellow card) 77' to 80'
TP	3	Ion Dascal	(substituted off) 46'
HK	2	Ruslan Dorogan	(substituted off) 42'
LP	1	Igor Orghianu	(substituted off) 65'
Replacements:
	16	Dumitru Vasilachi	(substituted on) 65'
	17	Sergiu Moroșanu	(substituted on) 42'
	6
	19	Dorin Botan	(substituted on) 64'
	20	Andrei Lungu	(substituted on) 46'
	21	Stefan Opre	(substituted on) 15'
	22	Ion Constantin	(substituted on) 37'	(substituted off) 40'	(substituted on) 61'
	23	Grigore Lotca	(substituted on) 37'
Coach:
Sergiu Motoc

Touch judges:
Stuart Douglas (Ireland)
Chris Harrington (Ireland)

12 March 2017
15:00 WET (UTC+01)

(1 BP) Switzerland	54–18	Ukraine
Try: Thibault Géry 8', 55'; Simon Perrod 19'; Julien Gros 48', 53'; Cyril Lin 69'; Jonathan Wullschläger 77'; Con: Simon Perrod 20', 54', 56'; Gaëtan Hirsch 70', 78'; Pen: Simon Perrod 16', 25', 40'	Report	Try: Ruslan Radchuk 38'; Mykola Aleksandriuk 58'; Con: Oleg Kosariev 39'; Pen: Oleg Kosariev 13', 21'

CS Cherpines, Plan-les-Ouates
Attendance: 2,000
Referee: Radu Petrescu (Romania)

FB	15	Thibault Géry
RW	14	Florian Escoffier
OC	13	Ludovic Porret		(substituted off) 54'	(substituted on) 71'
IC	12	Ghislain Montiel
LW	11	Lucas Heinrich		(substituted off) 71'
FH	10	Julien Gros
SH	9	Simon Perrod		(substituted off) 61'
N8	8	Cyril Lin (c)
OF	7	Ludovic Pommies		(substituted off) 71'
BF	6	Jonathan Wullschläger
RL	5	Nicolas Guyou	(yellow card) 4' to 14'		(substituted off) 61'
LL	4	Tim Vogtli
TP	3	Clément Bärtschi		(substituted off) 63'
HK	2	Mathieu Paul		(substituted off) 59'
LP	1	Cyril Lafuye		(substituted off) 10'
Replacements:
	16	Ashley Cumbers		(substituted on) 63'
	17	Maxime Luçon		(substituted on) 59'
	18	Dorian Hustaix		(substituted on) 10'
	19	Mathias Bernath-Yendt		(substituted on) 71'
	20	Edgar Alber		(substituted on) 61'
	21	Gaëtan Hirsch		(substituted on) 61'
	22	Francis Gangath-Samba		(substituted on) 54'
	23	Liam Kavanagh
Coach:
(France) Olivier Nier

FB	15	Volodymy Voitov
RW	14	Ihor Snisarenko
OC	13	Sergii Garkavyi		(substituted off) 50'
IC	12	Viacheslav Ponomarenko
LW	11	Oleg Kosariev
FH	10	Sergiy Tserkovniy
SH	9	Sergii Ianchyi		(substituted off) 40'
N8	8	Ruslan Radchuk
OF	7	Oleksand Lomakin		(substituted off) 52'
BF	6	Valentyn Lytvynenko
RL	5	Oleksand Tsapenko
LL	4	Roman Kulakivskyi
TP	3	Mykola Aleksandriuk		(substituted off) 63'
HK	2	Mykola Kirsanov (c)		(substituted off) 72'
LP	1	Serhii Sukhih	(yellow card) 4' to 14'
Replacements:
	16	Ivan Zalizniak		(substituted on) 63'
	17	Konstyantyn Hurylov		(substituted on) 72'
	18	Oleg Lytvynenko
	19	Serhii Cherniachenko		(substituted on) 52'
	20	Vitalii Kuznietsov
	21	Maksym Kravchenko
	22	M. Delyergiev		(substituted on) 40'
	23	Maksym Churaiev		(substituted on) 50'
Coach:
(Ukraine) Valerii Kochanov

Touch judges:
Vlad Iordăchescu (Romania)
Emanuel Gorodea (Romania)

18 March 2017
13:30 EET (UTC+02)

Moldova	3–15	Poland
Pen: Ion Constantin 29'	Report	Try: Grzegorz Szczepański 18'; Radosław Rakowski 68'; Con: Wojciech Piotrowicz 19'; Pen: Wojciech Piotrowicz 33'

Stadionul Raional, Anenni Noi
Attendance: 350
Referee: Alexey Bryzgalin (Russia)

FB	15	Dorin Petrache
RW	14	Grigore Lotca	(yellow card) 60' to 70'	(substituted off) 80+4'
OC	13	Vasili Buzgan
IC	12	Ion Cavcaliuc
LW	11	Andrei Cibotari
FH	10	Ion Constantin
SH	9	Alexandru Ungureanu		(substituted off) 80+3'
N8	8	Sergiu Castravet		(substituted off) 51'
OF	7	Veaceslav Titica (c)
BF	6	Maxim Gargalic
RL	5	Andrei Romanov
LL	4	Andrei Mahu
TP	3	Ion Dascal
HK	2	Ruslan Dorogan		(substituted off) 75'
LP	1	Igor Orgheanu		(substituted off) 78'
Replacements:
	16	Dumitru Vasilachi		(substituted on) 75'
	17	Dumitru Ursu		(substituted on) 78'
	18	Ion Spatari
	19	Dorin Botan		(substituted on) 51'
	20	Andrei Lungu
	21	Vadim Preguza		(substituted on) 80+3'
	22	Ion Chitic		(substituted on) 80+4'
	23	Mihail Boian
Coach:
Sergiu Motoc

FB	15	Sebastian Gruszczyński	(substituted off) 38'
RW	14	Wojciech Brzezicki
OC	13	Daniel Gdula
IC	12	Grzegorz Szczepański
LW	11	Radosław Rakowski
FH	10	Wojciech Piotrowicz
SH	9	Dawid Plichta
N8	8	Piotr Zeszutek (c)
OF	7	Stanisław Powała-Niedźwiecki
BF	6	Mateusz Bartoszek
RL	5	Karol Perzak	(substituted off) 60'
LL	4	Piotr Karpiński II	(substituted off) 69'
TP	3	Toma Mchedlidze	(substituted off) 38'
HK	2	Łukasz Kujawa	(substituted off) 38'
LP	1	Marcin Wilczuk	(substituted off) 70'
Replacements:
	16	Sebastian Kacprzak	(substituted on) 38'
	17	Radosław Bysewski	(substituted on) 70'
	18	Adrian Ignaczak	(substituted on) 38'
	23	Piotr Wiśniewski	(substituted on) 69'
	20	Marek Płonka Jr	(substituted on) 60'
	25	Tomasz Rokicki
	22	Mateusz Plichta	(substituted on) 38'
	19	Adrian Chróściel
Coach:
(South Africa) Blikkies Groenewald

Touch judges:
Artur Kaptyukh (Russia)
Georgy Kopp (Russia)

18 March 2017
15:00 CET (UTC+01)

Netherlands	38–25	Switzerland
Try: Johnny Nas 23'; Josh Gascoigne 61'; Sep Visser 73'; Con: David Weersma 73'; Pen: David Weersma 14', 32', 40', 42', 50', 59', 67'	Report	Try: Tim Vogtli 20'; Mathias Bernath-Yendt 37'; Penalty Try 40'; Con: Benjamin Doy 20', 40'; Pen: Benjamin Doy 1', 45'

NRCA Stadium, Amsterdam
Attendance: 2,000
Referee: Iñigo Atorrasagasti (Spain)

FB	15	Josh Gascoigne
RW	14	Johnny Nas		(substituted off) 79'
OC	23	Rik Roovers (c)
IC	12	David Weersma
LW	11	Sep Visser
FH	10	Storm Carroll	(yellow card) 40' to 50'	(substituted off) 78'
SH	9	Amir Rademaker		(substituted off) 78'
N8	8	Vincent Wright
OF	7	Robin Kok		(substituted off) 45'
BF	6	Dirk Danen	(yellow card) 36' to 46'
RL	5	Chesney Crosby
LL	4	Rob Verbakel		(substituted off) 46'
TP	18	Andrew Darlington		(substituted off) 45'
HK	2	Mark Darlington		(substituted off) 78'
LP	1	Hugo Langelaan		(substituted off) 79'
Replacements:
	16	Roy Schermer		(substituted on) 79'
	17	Roberto Warmerdam		(substituted on) 78'
	3	Floris Kieft		(substituted on) 45'
	19	Tyler Koning		(substituted on) 46'
	20	Huey van Vliet		(substituted on) 45'
	21	Siem Noorman		(substituted on) 21'
	22	Marc Mistou Keijser		(substituted on) 78'
	13	Pieter Mol		(substituted on) 79'
Coach:
(South Africa) Gareth Gilbert

FB	15	Thibault Géry		(substituted off) 65'
RW	14	Florian Escoffier
OC	13	Ludovic Porret	(yellow card) 54' to 64'	(substituted off) 74'
IC	12	Baptiste Cariat
LW	11	Lucas Heinrich
FH	10	Benjamin Doy
SH	9	Gaëtan Hirsch		(substituted off) 59'
N8	8	Cyril Lin (c)
OF	7	Corentin Delabays
BF	6	Tim Vogtli
RL	5	Nicolas Guyou
LL	4	Mathias Bernath-Yendt		(substituted off) 54'
TP	3	Clément Bärtschi		(substituted off) 67'
HK	2	Maxim Luçon		(substituted off) 72'
LP	1	Dorian Hustaix		(substituted off) 75'
Replacements:
	16	Nathan Pelsy		(substituted on) 75'
	17	Manu Ronza		(substituted on) 72'
	18	Ashley Cumbers		(substituted on) 67'
	19	Edgar Albert		(substituted on) 54'
	20	Cédric Curdy
	21	Jeremy To'a		(substituted on) 59'	(yellow card) 68' to 78'
	22	Francis Gangath-Samba		(substituted on) 74'
	23	Louis Beaudoin		(substituted on) 65'
Coach:
(France) Olivier Nier

Touch judges:
Marc Riera (Spain)
Alfonso Mirat (Spain)

1 April 2017
15:00 EEST (UTC+03)

Ukraine	7–31	Portugal (1 BP)
Try: Valentyn Lytvynenko 39'; Con: Mykola Delyergiev 40'	Report	Try: Francisco Pinto Magalhães 10'; Bernardo Seara Cardoso 29'; Gonçalo Foro 68'; João Lino 74'; Nuno Penha e Costa 79'; Con: Nuno Penha e Costa 11' 30' 69'

Spartak Stadium, Odesa
Attendance: 4,000
Referee: Vlad Iordăchescu (Romania)

FB	15	Volodymyr Voitov
RW	14	Ievgen Zalevskyi	(substituted off) 74'
OC	13	Sergii Garkavyi
IC	12	Viacheslav Ponomarenko
LW	11	Oleg Kosariev	(yellow card) 59' to 69'
FH	10	Sergiy Tserkovniy
SH	9	Mykola Delyergiev	(substituted off) 56'
N8	8	Ruslan Radchuk
OF	7	Serhii Cherniachenko
BF	6	Valentyn Lytvynenko
RL	5	Oleksandr Tsapenko
LL	4	Roman Kulakivskyi	(substituted off) 49'
TP	3	Mykola Aleksandriuk	(substituted off) 63'
HK	2	Mykola Kirsanov (c)
LP	20	Vitalii Kramarenko	(substituted off) 55'
Replacements:
	16	Ivan Zalizniak	(substituted on) 63'
	17	Konstyantyn Hurylov
	18	Oleg Lytvynenko
	19	Oleksandr Lomakin	(substituted on) 49'
	1	Serhii Sukhih	(substituted on) 55'
	21	Maksym Kravchenko	(substituted on) 56'	(yellow card) 64' to 74'
	22	Maksym Kovalevskyi	(substituted on) 74'
	23	Maksym Churaev
Coach:
(Ukraine) Valerii Kochanov

FB	15	Nuno Sousa Guedes
RW	14	Gonçalo Foro
OC	13	Bernardo Seara Cardoso
IC	12	Manuel Vilela
LW	11	Adérito Esteves	(substituted off) 76'
FH	10	Nuno Penha e Costa
SH	9	Francisco Pinto Magalhães (c)	(substituted off) 72'
N8	8	Vasco Fragoso Mendes	(substituted off) 53'
OF	7	Miguel Macedo
BF	6	João Lino
RL	5	José Fino
LL	4	Fernando Almeida	(substituted off) 49'
TP	3	Francisco Bruno	(substituted off) 49'
HK	2	Duarte Diniz	(substituted off) 60'
LP	1	Bruno Medeiros	(substituted off) 72'
Replacements:
	16	José Leal da Costa	(substituted on) 72'
	17	João Corte-Real	(substituted on) 60'
	18	Diogo Hasse Ferreira	(substituted on) 49'
	19	José Sousa d'Alte	(substituted on) 49'
	20	Sebastião Villax	(substituted on) 53'
	21	Afonso Rodrigues
	22	Manuel Queirós	(substituted on) 72'
	23	Fábio Conceição	(substituted on) 76'
Coach:
(Portugal) Martim Aguiar

Touch judges:
Madalin Girbau (Romania)
Alexandru Ionescu (Romania)

8 April 2017
18:00 CEST (UTC+02)

Poland	14–13	Netherlands (1 BP)
Try: Wojciech Brzezicki 53'; Pen: Wojciech Piotrowicz 10', 40', 74'	Report	Try: Storm Carroll 28'; Sep Visser 38'; Pen: Josh Gascoigne 7'

Stadion Widzewa, Łódź
Attendance: 8,500
Referee: Tual Trainini (France)

FB	15	Mateusz Lament
RW	14	Wojciech Brzezicki
OC	13	Grzegorz Szczepański
IC	12	Daniel Gdula
LW	11	Andrzej Charlat
FH	10	Wojciech Piotrowicz		(substituted off) 79'
SH	9	Dawid Plichta	(yellow card) 27' to 37'	(substituted off) 56'
N8	8	Piotr Zeszutek (c)
OF	7	Michał Mirosz
BF	6	Stanisław Powała-Niedźwiecki		(substituted off) 71'
RL	5	Paweł Poniatowski		(substituted off) 40'
LL	4	Piotr Karpiński II
TP	25	Radosław Bysewski		(substituted off) 40'
HK	2	Adrian Ignaczak
LP	1	Marcin Wilczuk
Replacements:
	16	Sebastian Kacprzak		(substituted on) 40'	(yellow card) 71' to 81'
	17	Sebastian Kostałkowski
	18	Jonathan Michalak		(substituted on) 71'
	19	Marek Płonka Jr		(substituted on) 40'
	20	Piotr Wiśniewski
	21	Maciej Panasiuk
	22	Mateusz Plichta		(substituted on) 56'
	23	Tomasz Gasik		(substituted on) 79'
Coach:
(South Africa) Blikkies Groenewald

FB	15	Josh Gascoigne
RW	14	Pieter Mol	(substituted off) 57'
OC	22	Rik Roovers (c)
IC	12	Storm Carroll	(substituted off) 61'
LW	11	Sep Visser
FH	10	Liam McBride	(substituted off) 68'
SH	9	Amir Rademaker
N8	8	Vincent Wright
OF	7	Robin Kok
BF	6	Dirk Danen	(substituted off) 49'	(substituted on) 72'
RL	5	Chesney Crosby
LL	4	Mark Wokke	(substituted off) 40'
TP	18	Andrew Darlington	(substituted off) 49'
HK	2	Mark Darlington	(substituted off) 66'
LP	1	Hugo Langelaan	(substituted off) 72'
Replacements:
	16	Roy Schermer
	17	Roberto Warmerdam	(substituted on) 66'
	3	Floris Kieft	(substituted on) 49'
	19	Tyler Koning	(substituted on) 40'
	20	Huey van Vliet	(substituted on) 49'
	21	Conrad van der Klauw	(substituted on) 68'
	13	Alex Povel	(substituted on) 61'
	23	Johnny Nas	(substituted on) 57'
Coach:
(South Africa) Gareth Gilbert

Touch judges:
Flavien Hourquet (France)
Mikael Simon (France)

22 April 2017
17:00 CEST (UTC+02)

Poland	12–22	Switzerland
Try: Mateusz Lament 67'; Piotr Zeszutek 78'; Con: Tomasz Gasik (1/2) 68'	Report	Try: Lucas Heinrich 2', 44'; Cyril Lin 39'; Con: Gaëtan Hirsch (2/3) 3', 40'; Pen: Gaëtan Hirsch 80'

Stadion Polonii Warszawa, Warsaw
Attendance: (Not reported)
Referee: Matthew Carley (England)

FB	15	Mateusz Lament
RW	14	Wojciech Brzezicki		(substituted off) 49'
OC	13	Grzegorz Szczepański
IC	12	Daniel Gdula		(substituted off) 50'
LW	11	Tomasz Gasik
FH	10	Mateusz Plichta
SH	9	Dawid Plichta
N8	8	Piotr Zeszutek (c)
OF	7	Michał Mirosz
BF	6	Marek Płonka Jr	(yellow card) 17' to 27'	(substituted off) 60'
RL	5	Stanisław Powała-Niedźwiecki
LL	4	Piotr Karpiński II		(substituted off) 68'
TP	3	Sebastian Kacprzak
HK	2	Adrian Ignaczak
LP	1	Marcin Wilczuk		(substituted off) 68'
Replacements:
	16	Paweł Grabski
	17	Sebastian Kostałkowski
	18	Jonathan Michalak		(substituted on) 68'
	19	Sebastian Wisniewśki		(substituted on) 60'
	20	Maciej Panasiuk		(substituted on) 68'
	21	Markijan Grabowski		(substituted on) 50'
	22	Szymon Sirocki		(substituted on) 49'
	23	Adam Piotrowski
Coach:
(South Africa) Blikkies Groenewald

FB	15	Iain Mowat
RW	14	Liam Kavanagh		(substituted off) 57'
OC	13	Erwan Meudic
IC	12	Francis Gangath-Samba
LW	11	Lucas Heinrich
FH	10	Baptiste Cariat
SH	9	Gaëtan Hirsch
N8	8	Cyril Lin (c)
OF	7	Corentin Delabays	(yellow card) 17' to 27'
BF	6	Jonhathan Wullschläger
RL	5	Nicolas Guyou		(substituted off) 72'
LL	4	Tim Vogtli		(substituted off) 77'
TP	3	Clément Bärtschi		(substituted off) 78'
HK	2	Maxime Luçon
LP	1	Nathan Pelsy
Replacements:
	16	Simon Wood
	17	Romain Chamand
	18	Edgar Albert		(substituted on) 77'
	19	Mathias Bernath-Yendt		(substituted on) 72'
	20	Ludovic Pommies		(substituted on) 57'
	21	Pascal Chevaillier-Wullschleger
	22	Mathieu Guyou
	23	Dominic Gorman		(substituted on) 78'
Coach:
(France) Olivier Nier

Touch judges:
Andrew Jackson (England)
Clare Daniels (England)

== Statistics ==
=== Top points scorers ===
Pos	Name	Team	Pts
1	David Weersma	Netherlands	52
2	Simon Perrod	Switzerland	44
3	Wojciech Piotrowicz	Poland	36
4	Nuno Penha e Costa	Portugal	35
5	Nuno Sousa Guedes	Portugal	33
6	Sep Visser	Netherlands	30
7	Josh Gascoigne	Netherlands	28
8	Oleg Prepelita	Moldova	20
8	Oleg Kosariev	Ukraine	20
8	Mihai Golubenco	Moldova	20
11	Dirk Danen	Netherlands	15
11	Vasco Ribeiro	Portugal	15
11	Victor Arhip	Moldova	15

=== Top try scorers ===
Pos	Name	Team	Tries
1	Sep Visser	Netherlands	6
2	Josh Gascoigne	Netherlands	5
3	Oleg Prepelita	Moldova	4
4	Nuno Penha e Costa	Portugal	3
4	Dirk Danen	Netherlands	3
4	Vasco Ribeiro	Portugal	3
4	Victor Arhip	Moldova	3
8	Nuno Sousa Guedes	Portugal	2
8	Cyril Lin	Switzerland	2
8	Fernando Almeida	Portugal	2
8	Francisco Pinto Magalhães	Portugal	2
8	Gonçalo Foro	Portugal	2
8	Julien Gros	Switzerland	2
8	Lucas Heinrich	Switzerland	2
8	Maxim Gargalic	Moldova	2
8	Thibault Géry	Switzerland	2
8	Valentyn Lytvynenko	Ukraine	2
8	Veaceslav Titica	Moldova	2

== See also ==
- Rugby Europe International Championships
- 2016–17 Rugby Europe International Championships
- Six Nations Championship
- Antim Cup
