= Oleksiy Tsybko =

Ukrainian rugby union player and politician (1967–2022)

- Born: Цибко Олексій Олександрович; 19 March 1967 Smila, Ukrainian SSR, USSR
- Died: 31 March 2022 (aged 55) Bucha, Ukraine
- School: Lviv State University of Physical Culture
- University: Lviv National University

Rugby union career
International career
Years	Team	Apps	(Points)
1991–2003	Ukraine	40	

Oleksiy Oleksandrovich Tsybko (Ukrainian: Олексій Олександрович Цибко; 19 March 1967 – 31 March 2022) was a Ukrainian rugby union international for the Ukraine national rugby union team from 1991 to 2003 who was killed during the retaking of Bucha from Russian forces.

== Biography ==
Tsybko was born in Smila, Ukraine to a single mother. He would later take on the surname of his adoptive father, Oleksandr Cybko. As a youth, Tsybko was involved in athletics as a javelin and discus thrower, setting a distance record for discus at age 13. At age 20, he learned about rugby after watching a game in Kiev. He soon joined RC Aviator and RC Argo as a player. While playing for Aviator, the team was an 8-time Ukrainian national champions.

Tsybko would go on to make forty appearances for the Ukraine national rugby union team from 1991 until 2003, some as captain. In 2001, he married his wife Alla.

From 2003 to 2005 he was President of the Rugby Federation of Ukraine. There, he worked to develop the sport in the country. In 2007, he founded a rugby club in his hometown of Smila, where 600 children would go on to learn how to play rugby, with some competing as part of the national rugby team.

In 2014 he joined the Ukraine military forces to defend the Crimea from Russian forces. Viewing rugby as a philosophy of life, his military callsign was "Rugbyst".

On 29 October 2015, Tsybko became mayor of Smila, serving until 2020. In 2020, his daughter Sofia was born.

When Russia invaded Ukraine in 2022, Tsybko rejoined the military. He died in March 2022 during the Russian invasion of Bucha. He was buried at Baikove Cemetery in Kyiv.

== Awards ==
- USSR Master of Sports, discus throwing
- 2022, "For Combat Merit"
- 2022, "Honorary Citizen of Smila"
- 2022, Oleksiy Tsybko Memorial Museum
- 2022, honoured with the Polish sports shield, "Gloria Heroibus"

== See also ==
- Bucha massacre
- Battle of Bucha
- List of Ukrainian sports figures killed during the Russo-Ukrainian war
