= 1998–99 FIRA Tournament =

Rugby union tournament

- Date: 26 September 1998 – 12 June 1999

Tournament statistics
- Champions: Not awarded

The 1998–99 FIRA Tournament was a rugby union tournament organized by the Fédération Internationale de Rugby Amateur (FIRA).

The tournament did not assign a champion. Only minnow teams participated, because Romania, Georgia, Morocco, Portugal and Netherlands were still involved in qualification for the 1999 Rugby World Cup.

The teams were divided into different division and pools. Russia won the Gold or Division 2.

== "GOLD" (Division 2) ==
Admitted to 2000 Division 2
Admitted to 2000 Division 3

Place	Nation	Games				Points			Table points
Place	Nation	played	won	drawn	lost	for	against	diff.	Table points
1	Russia	3	3	0	0	167	39	+128	9
2	Ukraine	3	2	0	1	77	83	−6	7
3	Czech Republic	3	0	1	2	53	97	−44	4
4	Poland	3	0	1	2	49	127	−78	4

26 September 1998

Czech Republic	22–27	Ukraine

Prague

24 October 1998

Poland	18–18	Czech Republic

Bydgoszcz

1 May 1999

Ukraine	37–18	Poland

Kyiv

8 May 1999

Russia	43–13	Ukraine

Trud Stadium, Penza

15 May 1999

Poland	13–72	Russia

Gdańsk

29 May 1999

Czech Republic	13–52	Russia

Vyškov

== "SILVER" (Division 3) ==
=== Pool 1 ===
The two matches scheduled in Serbia and Montegnegro were cancelled due to the Kosovo War.

Admitted to 2000 Division 2
Admitted to 2000 Division 3
Admitted to 2000 Division 4

Place	Nation	Games				Points			Table points
Place	Nation	played	won	drawn	lost	for	against	diff.	Table points
1	Germany	4	4	0	0	97	30	+67	12
2	Tunisia	4	3	0	1	106	33	+73	10
3	Belgium	4	2	0	2	76	64	+12	8
4	Luxembourg	4	1	0	3	20	124	−104	6
5	Yugoslavia	2	0	0	2	12	60	−48	2

10 October 1998

Belgium	12–6	Yugoslavia

Brussels

11 October 1998

Germany	13–6	Tunisia

Hanover

24 October 1998

Tunisia	23–9	Belgium

Tunis

25 October 1998

Germany	54–7	Luxembourg

Heusenstamm

6 March 1999

Belgium	38–8	Luxembourg

Brussels

25 April 1999

Germany	27–17	Belgium

Heidelberg

1 May 1999

Luxembourg	5–32	Tunisia

Cessange

8 May 1999

Tunisia	45–6	Yugoslavia

Tunis

22 May 1999

Yugoslavia	not played	Germany

25 April 1999

Yugoslavia	not played	Luxembourg

=== Pool 2 ===
Admitted to 2000 Division 2
Admitted to 2000 Division 4

Place	Nation	Games				Points			Table points
Place	Nation	played	won	drawn	lost	for	against	diff.	Table points
1	Croatia	4	4	0	0	204	17	+187	12
2	Slovenia	4	3	0	1	65	88	−23	10
3	Austria	4	2	0	2	68	86	−18	8
4	Hungary	4	1	0	3	56	91	−35	6
5	Bosnia and Herzegovina	4	0	0	4	38	149	−111	4

10 October 1998

Bosnia and Herzegovina	5–74	Croatia

Zenica

10 October 1998

Slovenia	16–12	Hungary

Ljubljana

17 October 1998

Austria	26–19	Bosnia and Herzegovina

Vienna

7 November 1998

Hungary	3–39	Croatia

Kecskemét

7 November 1998

Slovenia	25–9	Austria

Ljubljana

24 April 1999

Bosnia and Herzegovina	11–15	Slovenia

Vogošća

15 May 1999

Croatia	56–9	Slovenia

Ploče

15 May 1999

Hungary	34–3	Bosnia and Herzegovina

Esztergom

22 May 1999

Croatia	35–0	Austria

Zagreb

29 May 1999

Austria	33–7	Hungary

Vienna

=== Pool 3 ===
Admitted to 2000 Division 2
Admitted to 2000 Division 3
Admitted to 2000 Division 4

Place	Nation	Games				Points			Table points
Place	Nation	played	won	drawn	lost	for	against	diff.	Table points
1	Denmark	3	3	0	0	125	15	+110	9
2	Latvia	3	2	0	1	48	46	+2	7
3	Sweden	3	1	0	2	25	37	−12	5
4	Lithuania	2	0	0	2	16	116	−100	2

17 October 1998

Latvia	18–13	Sweden

Riga

31 October 1998

Denmark	19–9	Sweden

Copenhagen

7 November 1998

Latvia	0–23	Denmark

Riga

8 May 1999

Lithuania	10–30	Latvia

Vilnius

12 June 1999

Sweden	3 – 0 withdraw	Lithuania

Enkoping

29 May 1999

Denmark	83–6	Lithuania

Copenhagen

== "BRONZE" (Division 4) ==
Admitted to 2000 Division 3
Admitted to 2000 Division 4

Place	Nation	Games				Points			Table points
Place	Nation	played	won	drawn	lost	for	against	diff.	Table points
1	Switzerland	4	4	0	0	123	45	+78	12
2	Andorra	4	2	0	2	65	39	+26	8
3	Israel	4	2	0	2	58	84	−26	8
4	Monaco	4	1	0	3	58	92	−34	6
5	Bulgaria	4	1	0	3	39	83	−44	6

26 September 1998

Andorra	14–15	Switzerland

Andorra-la-Vella

31 October 1998

Bulgaria	5–3	Andorra

Sofia

21 November 1998

Switzerland	48–8	Bulgaria

Nyon

27 February 1999

Andorra	29–6	Monaco

Andorra-la-Vella

3 April 1999

Switzerland	40–7	Israel

Monthey

10 April 1999

Monaco	16–20	Switzerland

Montecarlo

24 April 1999

Bulgaria	10–11	Israel

Sofia

29 May 1999

Israel	27–15	Monaco

Ra'anana

12 June 1999

Monaco	21–16	Bulgaria

Montecarlo

12 June 1999

Israel	13–19	Andorra

Ra'anana

== Bibliography ==
- (in Italian) Francesco Volpe, Valerio Vecchiarelli (2000), 2000 Italia in Meta, Storia della nazionale italiana di rugby dagli albori al Sei Nazioni, GS Editore (2000) ISBN 88-87374-40-6.
- (in Italian) Francesco Volpe, Paolo Pacitti (Author), Rugby 2000, GTE Gruppo Editorale (1999).
- "Minor Tournaments FIRA Tournament 1998/99". The Rugby Archive. 19 December 2014. Archived from the original on 28 February 2022.
