= Ukraine national rugby union team =

National rugby union team

Ukraine
- Nickname: Kozaky (The Cossacks)
- Emblem: Trident
- Union: National Rugby Federation of Ukraine
- Head coach: Valerii Kochanov
- Captain: TBC
- Home stadium: Various
First colours	Second colours

World Rugby ranking
- Current: 50 (as of 8 June 2026)
- Highest: 24 (2004)
- Lowest: 51 (2026)

First international
- Georgia 19–15 Ukraine (Ukrainian Soviet Socialist Republic) (Tbilisi, Georgia; 21 November 1991)

Biggest win
- Ukraine 135–13 Slovakia (Piešťany, Slovakia; 9 November 2024)

Biggest defeat
- Romania 97–0 Ukraine (Bucharest, Romania; 19 March 2005)
- Website: www.rugby.org.ua

The Ukraine national rugby union team (Ukrainian: Збірна України з регбі) represents Ukraine in men's international rugby union competitions. Nicknamed the Cossacks (Козаки, Kozaky), it is one of the tier 3 teams in Europe that currently compete in the second division of the Rugby Europe International Championships in the Rugby Europe Trophy, a competition which is just below the Rugby Europe Championship where the top 6 countries in Europe (apart from the teams in the Six Nations) compete. They are yet to participate in any Rugby World Cup.

== History ==
Ukraine made their international debut in 1991 against Georgia after the dissolution of the Soviet Union, losing the close game 15-19. The two nations played again three days later, where Georgia won again with the score of 6-0. The following year Ukraine met Georgia once more for a two match series, losing both matches. In their first match of 1993, they defeated Hungary 41-3 for their first ever win since their independence. This was followed by another three wins in succession, against Croatia, Slovenia and Austria. This streak would however end in 1994 with a loss to Denmark.

In 1996 Ukraine defeated Latvia 19-3; the match would be the start of a nine match winning streak) which would be the longest thus far. The wins carried on until 1998, where they lost to the Netherlands 13-35. The late 1990s, Ukraine saw mixed results and defeated teams like Poland and the Czech Republic, but they lost games to the likes of their neighbours Russia, Georgia and Romania.

Ukraine played in the first division of 2005-06 European Nations Cup, the tournament where the best teams in Europe outside of the Six Nations and the tournament that also served as a qualifier for the 2007 Rugby World Cup in France. Ukraine lost all ten of their fixtures and were relegated to Division 2A while within the qualifiers, the bottom three teams went on to Round 4 of the European World Cup qualifiers, so Ukraine would find their selves playing against Russia twice to determine who goes through to the next round of the qualifiers. Ukraine lost both games by the scores 11-25 and 37-17.

== Record ==
=== World Cup ===
World Cup record								World Cup Qualification record					
Year	Round	P	W	D	L	F	A	P	W	D	L	F	A
(Australia) (New Zealand) 1987	Part of USSR: Not an independent country							Part of USSR: Not an independent country					
(United Kingdom) (Ireland) (France) 1991	Part of USSR: Not an independent country							Part of USSR: Not an independent country					
(South Africa) 1995	did not enter							did not enter					
(Wales) 1999	did not qualify							8	6	0	2	274	108
(Australia) 2003	did not qualify							4	3	0	1	100	54
(France) 2007	did not qualify							12	0	0	12	105	618
(New Zealand) 2011	did not qualify							11	6	0	5	177	219
(England) 2015	did not qualify							10	5	0	5	227	227
(Japan) 2019	did not qualify							5	0	0	5	52	215
(France) 2023	did not qualify							Automatically eliminated					
Total	0/8	0	0	0	0	0	0	50	20	0	30	935	1441

=== European Competitions ===
Season	Division	G	W	D	L	PF	PA	+/−	Pts	Pos
2000	European Nations Cup Second Division	4	1	0	3	54	135	-81	6	3rd
2000-01	European Nations Cup Second Division	5	4	0	1	65	61	+4	13	2nd
2002-04	European Nations Cup Second Division Pool A	8	7	1	0	200	74	+126	23	1st
2004-06	European Nations Cup First Division	10	0	0	10	77	556	-479	10	6th
2006-08	European Nations Cup Second Division 2A	8	3	0	5	117	128	-11	14	4th
2008-10	European Nations Cup Second Division 2A	8	5	0	3	140	109	+31	18	1st
2010-12	European Nations Cup First Division 1A	10	1	0	9	124	442	-318	5	6th
2012-14	European Nations Cup First Division 1B	10	5	0	5	227	227	0	24	3rd
2014-16	European Nations Cup First Division 1B	10	8	0	2	244	165	+79	36	2nd
2016-17	Rugby Europe Trophy	5	0	0	5	52	215	-163	0	6th
2017-18	Rugby Europe Conference 1 North	4	2	1	1	92	63	+29	12	2nd
2018-19	Rugby Europe Conference 1 North	4	3	0	1	113	29	+84	14	1st
2019-20	Rugby Europe Trophy	5	2	2	1	60	74	-19	14	3rd
2021-22*	Rugby Europe Trophy	5	1	0	4	108	177	-69	5	5th
2022-23	Rugby Europe Trophy	4	2	0	2	117	135	-18	9	2nd
2023-24	Rugby Europe Trophy	5	0	0	5	61	225	-164	0	6th

=== Overall ===
Below is a table of the representative rugby matches played by a Ukraine national XV at test level up until 26 September 2026, updated after match with Turkey.

Opponent	Played	Won	Lost	Drawn	% Won
Austria	2	2	0	0	100%
Belgium	8	4	4	0	50%
Bulgaria	1	1	0	0	100%
Croatia	6	4	2	0	66.67%
Czech Republic	10	4	6	0	40%
Denmark	3	2	1	0	66.67%
Georgia	9	0	9	0	0%
Georgia XV	1	0	1	0	0%
Germany	8	2	5	1	25%
Hungary	4	3	0	1	75%
Israel	1	1	0	0	100%
Latvia	3	2	1	0	66.67%
Lithuania	8	5	3	0	62.5%
Luxembourg	1	1	0	0	100%
Moldova	12	5	7	0	41.67%
Netherlands	9	6	3	0	66.67%
Poland	14	11	3	0	78.57%
Portugal	5	1	4	0	20%
Romania	7	0	7	0	0%
Russia	9	0	9	0	0%
Slovakia	1	1	0	0	100%
Slovenia	1	1	0	0	100%
Spain	2	0	2	0	0%
Sweden	10	9	1	0	90%
Switzerland	5	2	3	0	40%
Turkey	2	2	0	0	100%
Yugoslavia	1	1	0	0	100%
Total	143	70	71	2	48.95%

== Recent Matches ==
Matches

9 October 2021
12:50 EEST (UTC +3)

(1 LBP) Ukraine	24–27	Poland
	Report

Yunist Stadion, Lviv
Attendance: 2,000
Referee: John Catteau (Belgium)

23 October 2021
14:00 EEST (UTC+03)

(1 LBP) Lithuania	37–39	Ukraine
	Report

Regbio stadionas, Šiauliai
Attendance: 500
Referee: Ethan Glass (Switzerland)

== Current Players ==
The following players were selected for the 2021–22 Rugby Europe Trophy match against Lithuania.

- Head Coach: (Ukraine) Valerii Kochanov

Caps updated:

Player	Position	Date of birth (age)	Caps	Club/province
Serhii Sukhikh	Prop	28 October 1978 (age 48)		(Ukraine) RC Olymp
Mykola Kirsanov	Hooker	24 April 1980 (age 46)		(Ukraine) RC Olymp
Oleksii Novikov	Prop	1 January 1995 (age 31)		(Ukraine) RC Olymp
Matvii Bocharov	Lock	1 January 2000 (age 26)		(Ukraine) RC Olymp
Oleksandr Lomakin	Lock	2 May 1980 (age 46)		(Ukraine) RC Olymp
Serhii Nikitin	Back row	18 March 1990 (age 36)		(Ukraine) RC Polytechnic
Vitaly Orlov	Back row	5 October 1987 (age 39)		(Ukraine) RC Olymp
Serhii Cherniachenko	Back row	17 January 1990 (age 36)		(Ukraine) RC Olymp
Vadym Sivak	Scrum-half	26 August 1992 (age 34)		(Ukraine) RC Podillya
Volodymyr Voitov	Fly-half	10 August 1988 (age 38)		(Ukraine) RC Olymp
Dmytro Prodeus	Wing	19 October 1998 (age 28)		(Ukraine) RC Polytechnic
Viacheslav Ponomarenko	Centre	27 September 1982 (age 44)		(Ukraine) RC Olymp
Oleh Kosariev	Centre	6 October 1988 (age 38)		(Ukraine) RC Olymp
Denys Primushenetskiy	Wing	22 October 1998 (age 28)		(Ukraine) RC Polytechnic
Myroslav Shuliak	Fullback	10 October 1993 (age 33)		(Ukraine) RC Podillya
Serhii Liutyi	??	28 November 1998 (age 27)		(Ukraine) RC Epokha-Polytechnic
Valentyn Porokhonchuk	Hooker	29 January 1992 (age 34)		(Ukraine) RC Kredo-63
Oleg Valius	??	28 November 2000 (age 25)		(Ukraine) RC Podillya
Daniil Korovin	??	6 August 1990 (age 36)		(Ukraine) RC Epokha-Polytechnic
Andrii Tsarevskyi	??	17 January 1987 (age 39)		(Ukraine) RC Olymp
Oleksandr Marshuba	Scrum-half	27 February 1993 (age 33)		(Ukraine) RC Olymp
Narek Manukyan	Wing	4 June 1992 (age 34)		(Ukraine) RC Rebels
Denys Zakhlivnyi	??	29 May 1992 (age 34)		(Ukraine) RC Epokha-Polytechnic

=== Recent call-ups ===
The following players have also been called up to the squad within the last 12 months.

Player	Pos	Date of birth (age)	Caps	Club	Latest call-up
Vitalii Kramarenko	Prop			(Poland) Budowlani Łódź	v. Poland, 9 October 2021
Ruslan Radchuk	Lock	29 November 1986 (age 34)		(Ukraine) RC Kredo-63	v. Poland, 9 October 2021
Daniil Hapon	Scrum-half	18 November 2001 (age 19)		(Ukraine) SC Sokil	v. Poland, 9 October 2021
Oleh Zarovnyi	Fullback	19 September 2002 (age 19)		(Ukraine) Odesa National Team	v. Poland, 9 October 2021
Dmytro Mokretsov		24 March 1988 (33)		(Poland) Ogniwo Sopot	v. Poland, 9 October 2021
Oleksandr Khomenko		28 November 1990 (age 30)		(Ukraine) RC Podillya	v. Poland, 9 October 2021
Eduard Vertyletskyi				(Poland) Pogoń Siedlce	v. Poland, 9 October 2021
Roman Kulakivskyi	Lock	5 November 1986 (age 34)		(Ukraine) RC Kredo-63	v. Poland, 9 October 2021
Yaroslav Davydov		1 January 2001 (age 20)		(Ukraine) RC Olymp	v. Poland, 9 October 2021

== Coaches ==
=== Current coaching staff ===
Name	Nationality	Role
Maksym Kravchenko	UKR	Manager
Valerii Kochanov	UKR	Head coach
Oleh Kvasnytsia	UKR	Coach
Olena Zadorozhna	UKR	Physio

=== Former coaches ===
Name	Years	Tests	Won	Drew	Lost	Win percentage
(Ukraine) Valerii Kochanov						

== Notable players ==
- Andriy Kovalenco
- Vitaly Orlov
- Ivan Soroka and Alex Soroka - Ukrainian qualified Irish underage internationals

== See also ==
- Rugby union in Ukraine
- National Rugby Federation of Ukraine
- Ukraine national rugby sevens team
- Ukraine women's national rugby sevens team
- Sport in Ukraine
