= 2021–22 Rugby Europe Trophy =

- Date: 9 October 2021 – 9 April 2022
- Countries: Belgium; Germany; Lithuania; Poland; Switzerland; Ukraine

Tournament statistics
- Champions: Belgium (3rd title)
- Matches played: 12
- Attendance: 13,916 (1,160 per match)
- Tries scored: 78 (6.5 per match)

The 2021–22 Rugby Europe Trophy is the fifth season of the second premier rugby union competition for European national teams outside the Six Nations Championship which itself is a part of the Rugby Europe International Championships. The confirmed teams that are competing include Belgium, Germany, Lithuania, Poland, Switzerland and Ukraine.

== Participants ==
Nation	Stadium			Head coach	Captain
Nation	Home stadium	Capacity	Location	Head coach	Captain
Belgium	Stade Communal Fallon	2,500	Brussels	(France) Frédéric Cocqu	Jean-Maurice Decubber
Germany	Fritz-Grunebaum-Sportpark	5,000	Heidelberg	(Germany) Mark Kuhlmann	Jörn Schröder
Lithuania	Šiauliai Rugby Academy Stadium	4,000	Šiauliai	(Lithuania) Gediminas Marcišauskas	Tautvydas Krasauskas
Poland	Narodowy Stadion Rugby; Stadion Polonii	2,425; 7,150	Gdynia; Warsaw	(Wales) Christian Hitt	Piotr Zeszutek
Switzerland	Stade Municipal Yverdon; Colovray Sports Centre; Centre Sportif des Cherpines	6,600; 7,200; 1,000	Yverdon-les-Bains; Nyon; Plan-les-Ouates	(France) Olivier Nier	Cyril Lin
Ukraine	Spartak Stadium; Skif Stadium; KhTZ Stadium	4,800; 3,742; 2,000	Odesa; Lviv; Kharkiv	(Ukraine) Valerii Kochanov	Oleg Kosariev; Viacheslav Ponomarenko

== Table ==
Champions and promoted to Championship
Promoted to Championship

Place	Nation	Games				Points			Tries			TBP	LBP	Table points
Place	Nation	Played	Won	Drawn	Lost	For	Against	Diff	For	Against	Diff	TBP	LBP	Table points
1	Belgium	5	4	0	1	149	76	+73	21	5	+16	4	1	21
2	Poland	5	4	0	1	139	116	+23	15	15	0	1	0	17
3	Germany	5	3	0	2	150	95	+55	16	9	+7	3	2	17
4	Switzerland	5	2	0	3	120	117	+3	9	14	−5	1	0	9
5	Ukraine	5	1	0	4	63	148	−85	9	13	−4	0	1	5
6	Lithuania	5	1	0	4	108	177	−69	12	26	−14	0	1	5
Source - Points were awarded to the teams as follows: Win – 4 points | Draw – 2 points | At least 3 more tries than opponent – 1 point | Loss within 7 points – 1 point | Completing a Grand Slam – 1 point

== Fixtures ==
9 October 2021
12:50 EEST (UTC +3)

(1 LBP) Ukraine	24–27	Poland
	Report

Yunist Stadion, Lviv
Attendance: 2,000
Referee: John Catteau (Belgium)

23 October 2021
13:50 EEST (UTC+03)

(1 LBP) Lithuania	37–39	Ukraine
	Report

Šiauliai Rugby Academy Stadium, Šiauliai
Attendance: 500
Referee: Ethan Glass (Switzerland)

30 October 2021
13:50 EEST (UTC+03)

Lithuania	16–46	Germany (1 TBP)
	Report

Šiauliai Rugby Academy Stadium, Šiauliai
Attendance: 450
Referee: Gert Visser (Netherlands)

13 November 2021
14:55 CET (UTC+01)

Poland	21–16	Germany (1 LBP)
	Report

Narodowy Stadion Rugby, Gdynia
Attendance: 2,500
Referee: Saba Abulashvili (Georgia)

13 November 2021
15:20 CET (UTC+01)

Switzerland	20–28	Lithuania
	Report

Centre Sportif de Colovray, Nyon
Attendance: 1,140
Referee: Dan O'Connell (Germany)

20 November 2021
14:20 CET (UTC+01)

Poland	37–25	Switzerland
	Report

Stadion Polonii, Warsaw
Attendance: N/A
Referee: Eki Fanlo (Spain)

12 February 2022
15:00 CET (UTC+01)

(1 TBP) Belgium	28–0	Ukraine
	n/a

n/a
Attendance: n/a
Referee: n/a

19 February 2022
14:50 CET (UTC+01)

(1 LBP) Germany	26–33	Belgium (1 TBP)
	Report

Fritz Grunebaum Sportpark, Heidelberg
Attendance: 1,000
Referee: Shota Tevzadze (Georgia)

12 March 2022
15:20 CET (UTC+01)

Switzerland	22–18	Belgium (1 LBP)
	Report

Stade des Cherpines, Geneva
Attendance: 1,376
Referee: Alexandru Ionescu (Romania)

19 March 2022
13:45 CET (UTC+01)

(1 TBP) Germany	34–25	Switzerland
	Report

Sportzentrum Martinsee, Heusenstamm
Attendance: 800
Referee: Gert Visser (Ireland)

19 March 2022
14:50 CET (UTC+01)

(1 TBP) Belgium	41–11	Poland
	Report

Sportscentrum Nelson Mandela, Brussels
Attendance: 1,850
Referee: Andrew Cole (Netherlands)

26 March 2022
13:50 EST (UTC+03)

Lithuania	17–29	Belgium (1 TBP)
	Report

Šiauliai Rugby Academy Stadium, Šiauliai
Attendance: 300
Referee: Inigo Atorrasagasti (Spain)

9 April 2022
14:35 CEST (UTC+02)

(1 TBP) Poland	43–10	Lithuania
	Report

Narodowy Stadion Rugby, Gdynia
Attendance: 2,000
Referee: Eugeniu Procopi, (Romania)

16 April 2022
15:00 CEST (UTC +2)

Germany	28–0	Ukraine
	n/a

n/a
Attendance: n/a
Referee: n/a

30 April 2022
15:00 EEST (UTC +3)

Ukraine	0–28	Switzerland
	n/a

Dynamo Stadium, Kharkiv
Attendance: n/a
Referee: n/a

== See also ==
- Rugby Europe International Championships
- Six Nations Championship
