= KhTZ Stadium =

Multi-purpose stadium in Kharkiv, Ukraine

Regional Sports Complex KhTZ
- KhTZ, XT3
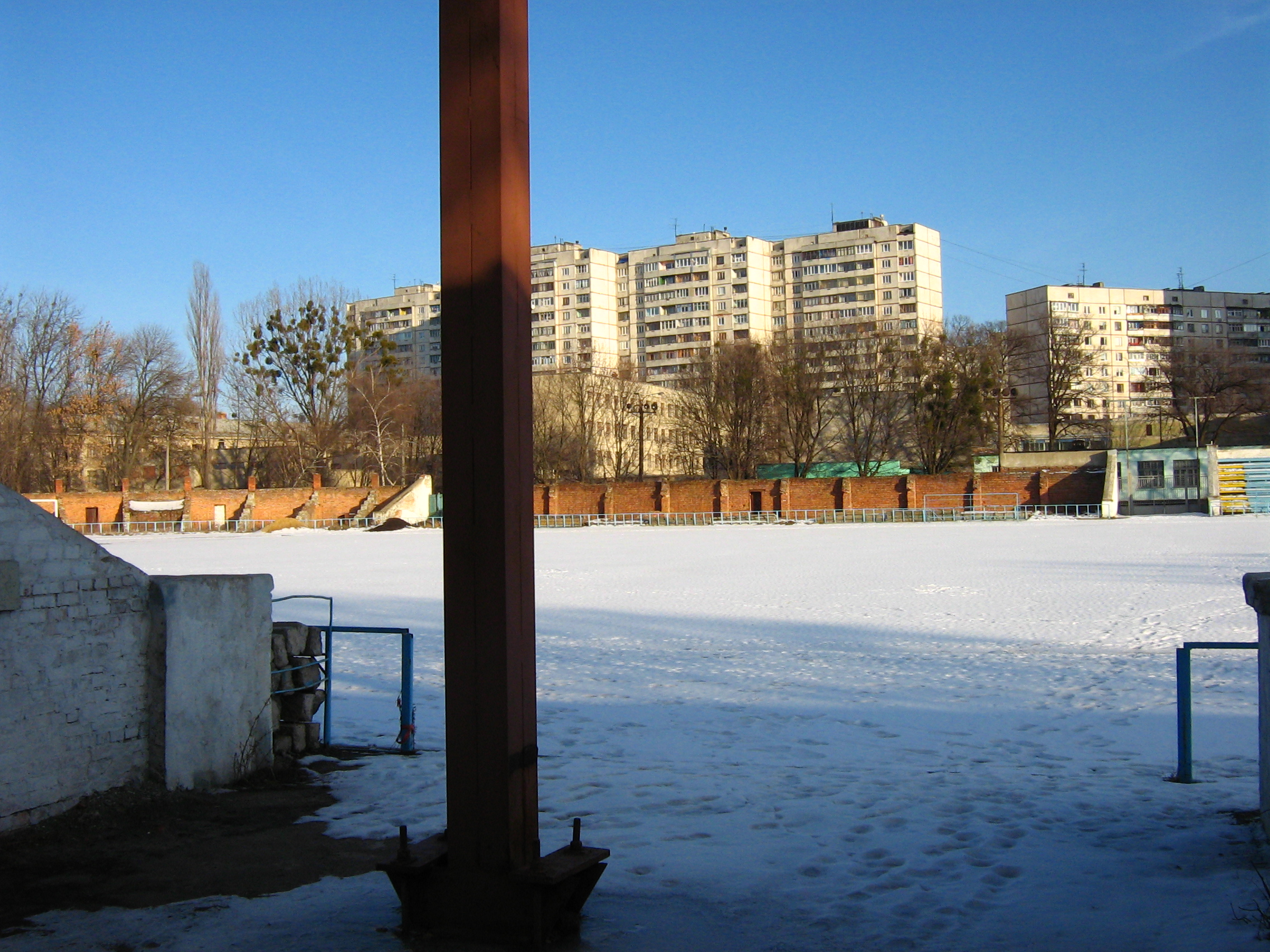
- Interactive map of Regional Sports Complex KhTZ
- Location: prospekt Moskovsky 244/1, Kharkiv, Ukraine
- Coordinates: 49°57′26.18″N 36°21′7.75″E
- Owner: City of Kharkiv
- Operator: Olympia sports school of Olympic reserve
- Surface: Field (Grass)

Construction
- Built: 1933

Tenants
- FC Torpedo Kharkiv; WFC Zhytlobud-1 Kharkiv; FC Helios Kharkiv; RC Olymp (Ukraine Rugby Superliga, rugby union); RC TEX-A-C (Ukraine Rugby Superliga, rugby union)

KhTZ Stadium is a multi-purpose stadium and a city company located within Industrialnyi District, Kharkiv, commonly known as KhTZ. Near the closest Kharkiv Metro stations Imeni O.S. Maselskoho, it serves as a home soil to rugby clubs RC Olуmp and RC TEX-A-C and is sometimes used for athletics tournaments of domestic importance. The stadium also is a home to the Olympia sports school of the Olympic reserve.

== History ==
The stadium was built in Soviet times as a primary fitness centre for workers of the Kharkiv Tractor Plant. The stadium is a home to FC Torpedo Kharkiv and women's team WFC Zhytlobud-1 Kharkiv

KhTZ Stadium has seven tennis courts, a light athletics hall, a boxing ring and a cycling track. Across from the stadium there is located the Hart swimming center, formerly Trudovi Rezervy.

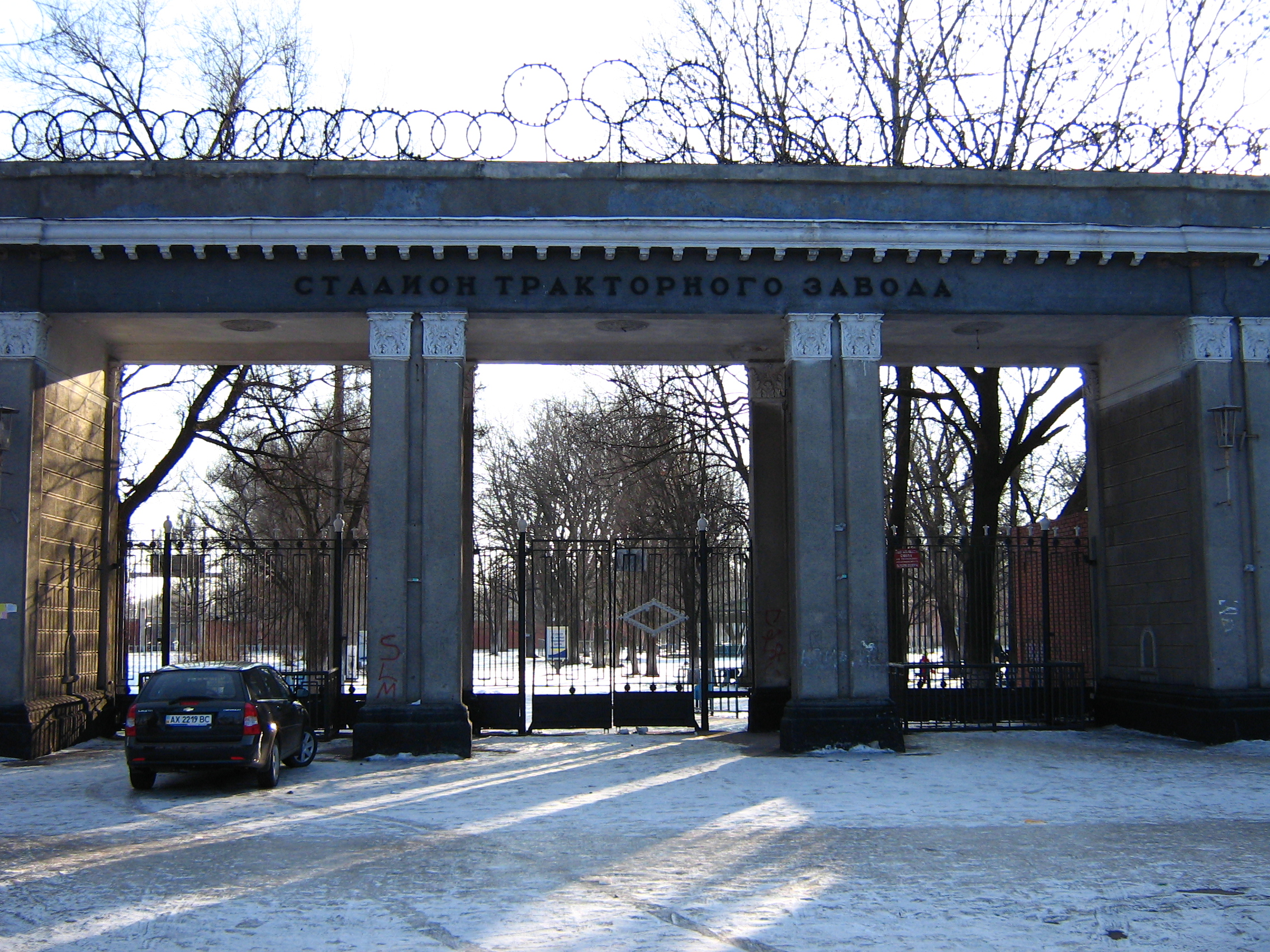
entrance

== See also ==
- Metalist Stadium
