= Viacheslav Ponomarenko =

Ukrainian military officer and rugby union player

- В‘ячеслав Анатолійович Пономаренко
- Born: Viacheslav Analoliyovych Ponomarenko; 27 September 1982 (age 44)
- Military career
- Allegiance: Ukraine
- Branch: Ukrainian Ground Forces
- Conflicts: Russo-Ukrainian War
- Awards: Hero of Ukraine

Viacheslav Ponomarenko (Ukrainian: В’ячеслав Анатолійович Пономаренко; born 27 September 1982) is a lieutenant colonel of the Armed Forces of Ukraine and a participant in the Russo-Ukrainian war. He is Hero of Ukraine with the award of the Order of the Golden Star. He plays rugby union for the Ukraine national rugby union team.

== Awards ==
- The title of Hero of Ukraine with the award of the Order of the Golden Star (2022) — for personal courage and heroism shown in the defense of the state sovereignty and territorial integrity of Ukraine, loyalty to the military oath.

== Rugby union ==
Ponomarenko is a centre for the Ukraine national team and is a member of RC Olymp which plays in the Ukraine Rugby Superliga. He mde his debut for the national side in 2008.

Viacheslav Ponomarenko
- Full name: В‘ячеслав Анатолійович Пономаренко
- Born: 27 September 1982 (age 44)

Rugby union career
- Position(s): Centre, Fullback
- Current team: RC Olymp
Senior career
Years	Team	Apps	(Points)
- RC Olymp
- Correct as of 1 April 2024
International career
Years	Team	Apps	(Points)
2008-	Ukraine		
- Correct as of 1 April 2024
National sevens team
Years	Team		Comps
2012-2013	Ukraine		3
- Correct as of 1 April 2024
