= National Rugby Federation of Ukraine =

Governing body for rugby union in Ukraine

Федерація регбі України
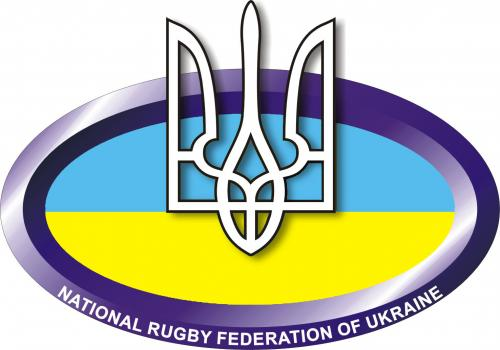
- Sport: Rugby union
- Founded: 1991; 35 years ago
- World Rugby affiliation: 1992
- Rugby Europe affiliation: November 1992
- Headquarters: Cheska 9, Kyiv, Ukraine
- President: Yevhen Bazhenkov
- Men's coach: Zaza Lejava (2011-)
- Website: rugby.org.ua

The National Rugby Federation of Ukraine (Ukrainian: Федерація регбі України, romanized: Federatsia rehbi Ukrainy) is the governing body for rugby union in Ukraine. It was founded in 1991 and became affiliated to the International Rugby Board in 1992. It is based in Kyiv.

== History ==
Ukraine made their international debut in 1991 against Georgia after the dissolution of the Soviet Union, losing the close game 15–19. The two nations played again three days later, where Georgia won again with the score of 6–0. The following year Ukraine met Georgia once more for a two match series, losing both matches. In their first match of 1993. they defeated Hungary 41-3 for their first ever win since their independence. This was followed by another three wins in succession, against Croatia, Slovenia and Austria. This streak would however end in 1994 with a loss to Denmark.

In 1996 Ukraine defeated Latvia 19–3; the match would be the start of a nine-match winning streak, which would be the longest thus far. The wins carried on until 1998, where they lost to the Netherlands 13–35. The late 1990s, Ukraine saw mixed results and defeated teams like Poland and the Czech Republic, but they lost games to the likes of their neighbours Russia, Georgia and Romania.

Ukraine played in the first division of 2005-06 European Nations Cup, the tournament where the best teams in Europe outside of the Six Nations and the tournament that also served as a qualifier for the 2007 Rugby World Cup in France. Ukraine lost all ten of their fixtures and were relegated to Division 2A while within the qualifiers, the bottom three teams went on to Round 4 of the European World Cup qualifiers, so Ukraine would find their selves playing against Russia twice to determine who goes through to the next round of the qualifiers. Ukraine lost both games by the scores 11-25 and 37–17.

== See also ==
- Rugby union in Ukraine
- Ukraine national rugby union team
- Ukraine national rugby sevens team
- Ukraine women's national rugby sevens team
- Ukraine Rugby Superliga, the top men's league
