= RC Olymp =

Ukrainian rugby union club, based in Kharkiv

- Full name: Rugby Club Olymp
- Founded: 1989; 37 years ago
- Location: Kharkiv, Ukraine
- Ground(s): KhTZ Stadium; Dynamo Stadium (Capacity: 2,000; 3,000)
- Coach: Valery Kochanov
Team kit

RC Olymp is a Ukrainian rugby club in Kharkiv. The team currently plays in the Ukraine Rugby Superliga. For the past few years the club has produced the majority of the Ukraine national team.

== History ==
The club was founded in 1989.

== Players ==
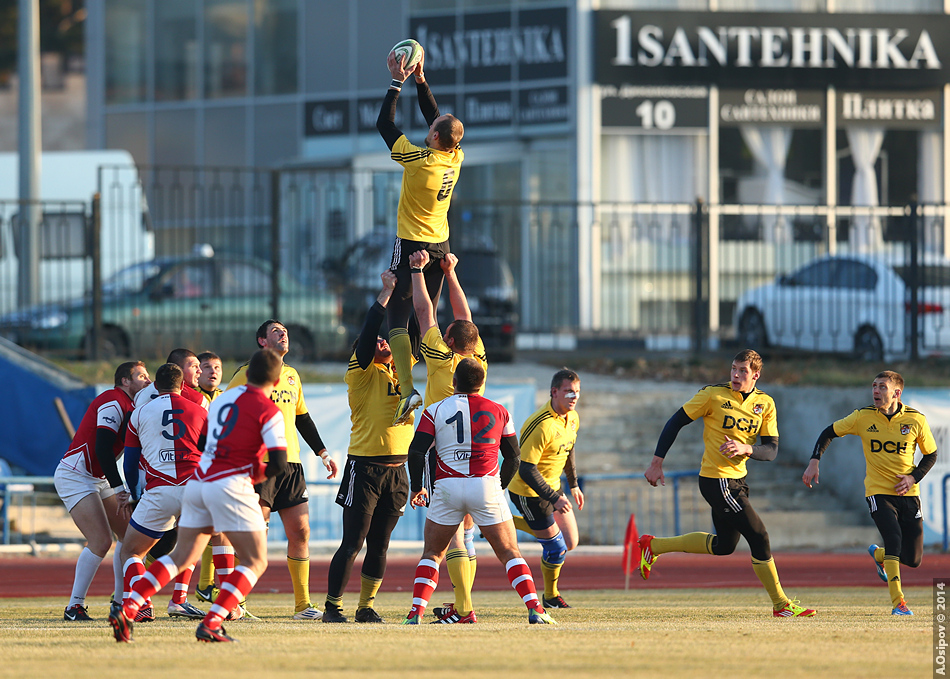
Game with RC Kredo-63

RC Olymp Squad for 2023/24
**Props**: (Ukraine) **Sergiy Sukhih**; (Ukraine) **Oleski Novikov**; **Hookers**: (Ukraine) **Mykola Kirsanov**; **Locks**: (Ukraine) Sergiy Cerkovnij; (Ukraine) Oleksandr Lamakin; (Ukraine) **Matvii Bocharanov**	**Backrow**: (Ukraine) **Sergiy Cheryachenko** (cc); (Ukraine) **Andriy Tsarevsky**; (Ukraine) **Vitaly Orlov**; **Scrumhalfs**: (Ukraine) Oleksandr Marshuka; **Flyhalfs**: (Ukraine) **Volodymyr Voytov**	**Centres**: (Ukraine) Maxim Kravchenko; (Ukraine) Maxim Kovalevsky; (Ukraine) **Viacheslav Ponomarenko**; **Wingers**: (Ukraine) Alexandre Lyubii; (Ukraine) **Oleg Kosarev** (cc); (Ukraine) **Yasolav Davydov**; **Fullback**: (Ukraine) Ivan Zaliznayak
(c) denotes the team captain, **Bold** denotes internationally capped players.^{*} denotes players qualified to play for Ukraine on residency or dual nationality.

=== Out for 2014–2015 ===
- (Armenia) Sahak Oganezov (to Blue Bulls)

== Staff ==
- Head Coach: Valery Kochanov
- Assistant Coach: Sergey Nedbaylo
- Assistant Coach: Vladimir Tsapenko
- Team Doctor: Sergey Podporynov
