= RC Evko-More =

Ukrainian rugby union club, based in Feodosiya

- Full name: Rugby Club Evko-More
- Founded: 1973; 53 years ago
- Location: Feodosiya, Ukraine
- Ground: Stadion Im. V.A. Shayderova
- Coach: (Ukraine) Yury Evenko
Team kit

RC Evko-More (Ukrainian: РК Evko-Море, RK Evko-More) is a Ukrainian rugby union club in Feodosiya. They currently play in Group A of the Ukraine Rugby Superliga.

== History ==
The club was founded in 1973.
