= 2000 European Nations Cup Third Division =

- Date: 2 October 1999 - 20 May 2000
- Countries: Czech Republic; Poland; Switzerland; Latvia; Belgium

Tournament statistics
- Champions: Czech Republic
- Matches played: 15

The 2000 European Nations Cup (ENC) Third Division (a European rugby union competition for national teams) was contested by five countries over one year during which all teams met each other once. The winner was Czech Republic and the runner-up was Poland. Both were promoted to Division 2.

Tunisia, played as host, out of ranking.

== Table ==
Place	Nation	Games				Points			Table points
Place	Nation	played	won	drawn	lost	for	against	difference	Table points
1	Czech Republic	4	4	0	0	119	73	+46	12
2	Poland	4	3	0	1	112	69	+43	10
3	Switzerland	4	1	0	3	47	60	−13	6
4	Latvia	4	1	0	3	72	91	−19	6
5	Belgium	4	1	0	3	65	122	−57	6

== Results ==
2 October 1999

Poland	41–8	Latvia

Gdańsk

16 October 1999

Switzerland	18–22	Czech Republic

Nyon

16 October 1999

Belgium	14–43	Poland

Brussels

13 November 1999

Switzerland	10–5	Latvia

Geneva

4 March 2000

Belgium	18–11	Switzerland

Brussels

18 March 2000

Belgium	12–9	Tunisia

Moons

25 March 2000

Tunisia	31–20	Latvia

Tunis

1 April 2000

Poland	15–8	Switzerland

Warsaw

1 April 2000

Tunisia	33–3	Czech Republic

Tunis

15 April 2000

Czech Republic	28–23	Belgium

Prague

15 April 2000

Tunisia	40–6	Switzerland

Tunis

6 May 2000

Tunisia	42–0	Poland

Tunis

7 May 2000

Latvia	19–30	Czech Republic

Riga

13 May 2000

Latvia	40–10	Belgium

Riga

20 May 2000

Czech Republic	39–13	Poland

Prague

== See also ==
- European Nations Cup First Division 2000
- European Nations Cup Second Division 2000
- European Nations Cup Fourth Division 2000
