= RC Roland =

Ukrainian rugby union club, based in Ivano-Frankivsk

- Full name: Rugby Club Roland
- Location: Ivano-Frankivsk, Ukraine
- Ground: Stadion Im. Heroev Pozharnykov
Team kit

RC Roland (Ukrainian: РК Роланд, romanized: RK Roland) is a Ukrainian rugby union club in Ivano-Frankivsk. The club is named after the Roland Battalion, a Ukrainian subunit of the German Abwehr during World War II. They are one of the four teams comprising the additional group in the Ukraine Rugby Superliga.
