= RC Batyari =

Ukrainian rugby union club, based in Lviv

- Full name: Rugby Club Batyari
- Nickname: Batyari (Batiars)
- Founded: 2009; 17 years ago
- Location: Lviv, Ukraine
- Ground: Yunist Stadium
Team kit

RC Batyari (Ukrainian: РК "Батяри", RK Batyari) is a Ukrainian rugby union club in Lviv. They are one of the four teams comprising the additional group in the Ukraine Rugby Superliga.

== Name ==
Lviv Batyary - Lviv subculture, which existed from the middle of the 19th century to the middle of the 20th century.
