= Vitaly Orlov (rugby union) =

Ukrainian rugby union player

- Born: October 5, 1987 (age 39) Ukraine

Rugby union career
- Position: Loose forward
Senior career
Years	Team	Apps	(Points)
2009–	Yenisey-STM		
International career
Years	Team	Apps	(Points)
2008–Present	Ukraine	4	(5)

Vitaly Orlov (born 5 October 1987) is a Ukrainian rugby union player. He plays as number eight and as a flanker.

Orlov played for Aviator Kyiv, in Ukraine, moving afterwards to the professional Russian team of Yenisey-STM Krasnoyarsk, in 2009/10, where he currently plays.

He has also been selected for Ukraine. He participated in the 2011 Rugby World Cup qualifyings, where Ukraine was eliminated after two losses to Romania. He was a member of the winning team of the 2008–2010 European Nations Cup Second Division, which earned Ukraine promotion for the First Division.
