= RC TEX-A-C =

Ukrainian rugby union club, based in Kharkiv

- Full name: Rugby Club TEX-A-C
- Founded: 2002; 24 years ago
- Location: Kharkiv, Ukraine
- Ground: KhTZ Stadium
- Coach: (Ukraine) Mykola Kirsanov
Team kit

RC TEX-A-C (Ukrainian: РК ТЕХ-А-С) is a Ukrainian rugby union club in Kharkiv. They currently play in Group A of the Ukraine Rugby Superliga.

== History ==
The club was founded in 2002.
