= Francisco Pinto Magalhães =

Portuguese rugby union player

Francisco Pinto Magalhães (born Lisbon, 5 November 1986) is a Portuguese rugby union player. He plays as a scrum-half.

He plays for CDUL at the Campeonato Português de Rugby.

He has 45 caps for Portugal, since his debut at the 31-3 loss to Georgia, at 2 February 2008, in Tbilisi, for the Six Nations B. He has scored 4 tries, 20 points on aggregate. He was a regular player for the "Lobos", and their captain. His most recent cap was at the 25-21 loss to Brazil, at 10 June 2017, in Pacaembu, in a tour. He has been absent from the national team since then.
