= Victor Arhip =

- Born: 24 February 1990 (age 36) Chișinău, Moldavian SSR, USSR (now in Moldova)
- Height: 192 cm (6 ft 4 in)
- Weight: 112 kg (247 lb; 17 st 9 lb)
- Notable relative: Dmitri Arhip (brother)

Rugby union career
- Position: Back row / Lock
- Current team: Krasny Yar
Senior career
Years	Team	Apps	(Points)
- USEFS-Blumarine
- Dinamo Bucharest
- Constanța
2011-2013	Enisey-STM		
2014–present	Krasny Yar		
International career
Years	Team	Apps	(Points)
- Moldova U20
2010–2016	Moldova	25	(25)
2022-present	Russia		
- Correct as of 1 February 2022

Victor Arhip (born 24 February 1990) is a Moldovan and Russian professional rugby union player who plays for Krasny Yar.

== Background ==
Victor Arhip was born in Chișinău where he lived until the age of 17. At the age of 15 he started playing rugby.

== Club career ==
He played in Moldova until the age of 18. Then he moved to Romania where he played for a number of Romanian teams. In 2011 he moved to Russia to play for Enisey-STM. At the end of 2013 he signed a contract with Krasny Yar.

== International career ==
Victor Arhip played 25 matches for Moldova. In November 2021 according to new naturalisation rules provided by World Rugby Arhip chose Russia national team for further international career. in January 2022 he was called up for the first training camp.

== Personal life ==
Victor's older brother Dmitri also plays rugby. Victor Arhip is married and has a son and a daughter.
