= Adérito Esteves =

Portuguese rugby union player

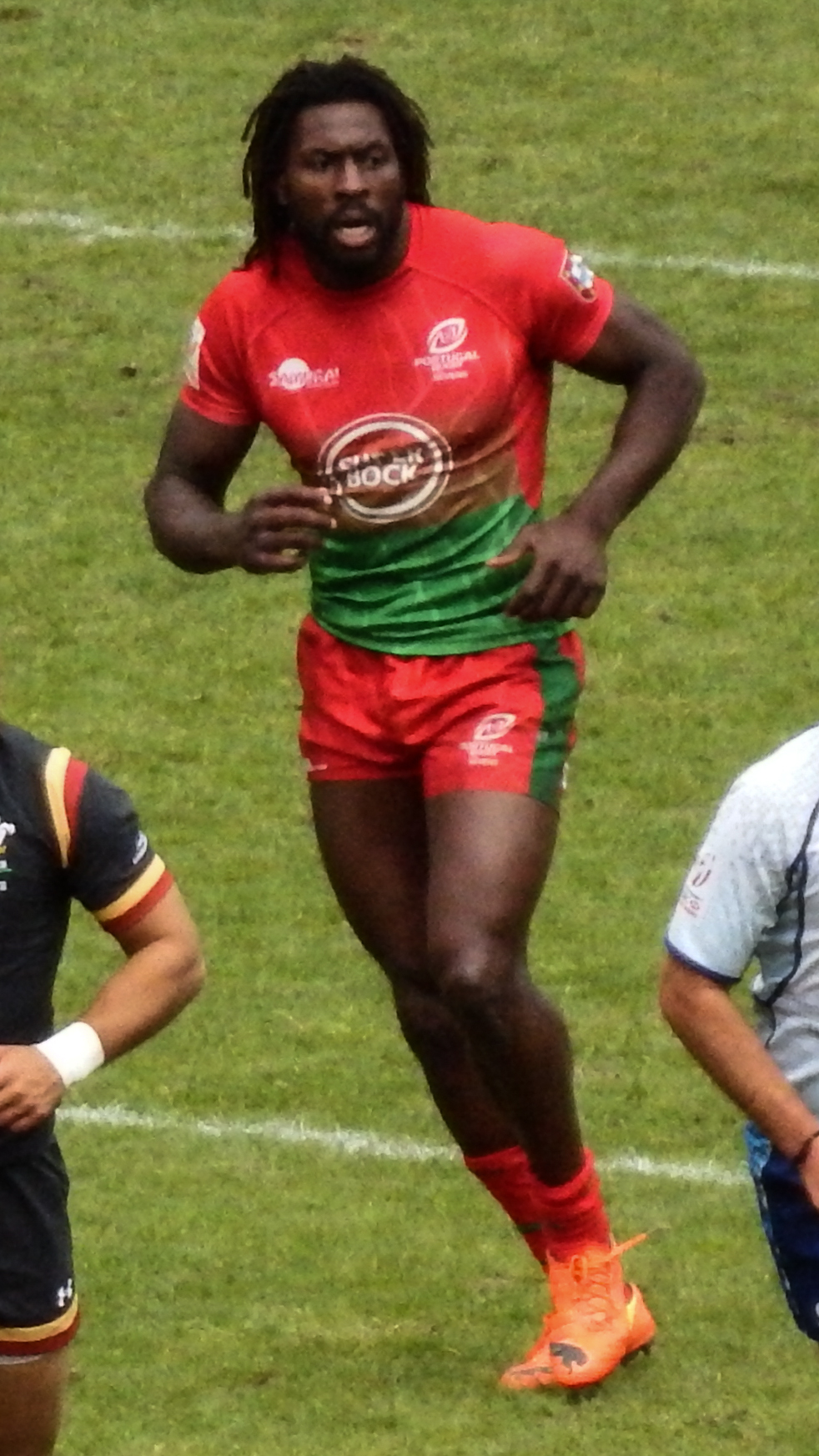
- Adérito Esteves in 2016.
- Born: October 8, 1985 (age 41)
- Height: 6 ft 4 in (193 cm)
- Weight: 234 lb (106 kg)

Rugby union career
- Position: Wing
Amateur team(s)
Years	Team	Apps	(Points)
2005-2008	Agronomia		
2008-2016	Direito		
Senior career
Years	Team	Apps	(Points)
2010–2011	Saint-Étienne	1	(0)
2016–2019	Tarbes	43	(17)
International career
Years	Team	Apps	(Points)
2006–2018	Portugal	35	(15)
National sevens team
Years	Team		Comps
2011–2019	Portugal		49

Adérito Assunção Tiny Glória Esteves (born Sampriz, Ponte da Barca, 8 October 1985) is a Portuguese rugby union player. He plays as a wing.

Esteves has played for Rugby Clube de Oeiras, AEIS Agronomia and Grupo Desportivo Direito, in Portugal, winning four titles of National Champion for the "Lawyers" team in 2008/09, 2009/10, 2010/11 and 2012/13.

Esteves has 34 caps for Portugal, since his first game, a 17-37 loss to Russia, in Lisbon, for the IRB Nations Cup, at 13 June 2006. He wasn't called for the 2007 Rugby World Cup, but has been a regular player for the "Lobos" since then. He has 3 tries scored, 15 points on aggregate for his national team.

Esteves is one of the best players for the Sevens national side.
