= Cristian Ojovan =

Moldovan rugby union player

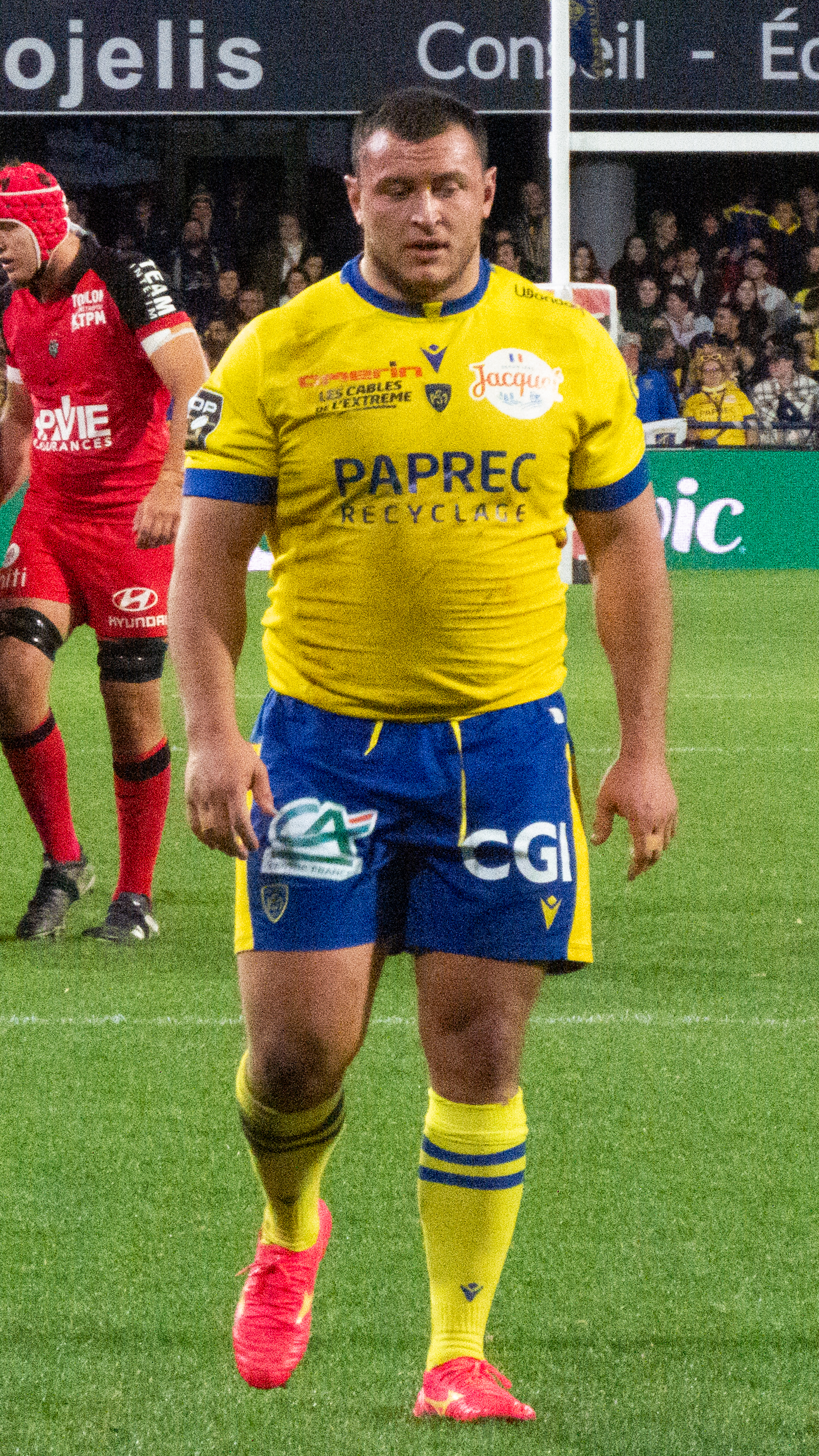
- Born: January 4, 1997 (age 29)
- Height: 1.83 m (6 ft 0 in)
- Weight: 118 kg (18 st 8 lb)

Rugby union career
- Position: Tighthead Prop
Senior career
Years	Team	Apps	(Points)
2018–2020	Stade Aurillacois	44	(5)
2020–	Clermont	122	(0)
- Correct as of 14 April 2021
International career
Years	Team	Apps	(Points)
2015–	Moldova	4	(5)
- Correct as of 3 April 2021

Cristian Ojovan (born 4 January 1997) is a Moldovan rugby union player. He plays for Clermont in Top 14.
