= RC Antares =

Ukrainian rugby union club, based in Kyiv

- Full name: Rugby Club Antares
- Founded: 1993; 33 years ago
- Location: Kyiv, Ukraine
- Coach: Vitaliy Evheniovych Rohanov
- League: Ukraine Rugby Superliga
Team kit

RC Antares (Ukrainian: РК Антарес, RK Antares) is a Ukrainian rugby union club in Kyiv. They currently play in Group B of the Ukraine Rugby Superliga. Web-page
