= 2000 European Nations Cup Second Division =

- Date: 18 September 1999 - 21 May 2000
- Countries: Russia; Croatia; Ukraine; Denmark; Germany

Tournament statistics
- Champions: Russia
- Matches played: 9

The 2000 European Nations Cup (ENC) Second Division (a European rugby union competition for national teams) was contested over a one-year period by five teams during which all of them met each other once. The winner was Russia, who won all the games and was promoted to Division 1. There was no relegation to Division 3.

== Table ==
Place	Nation	Games				Points			Table points
Place	Nation	played	won	drawn	lost	for	against	difference	Table points
1	Russia	4	4	0	0	267	18	249	12
2	Croatia	4	3	0	1	105	36	+29	9
3	Ukraine	4	1	0	3	54	135	−81	6
4	Denmark	4	1	0	3	78	188	−110	6
5	Germany	4	1	0	3	56	183	−127	6

== Results ==
18 September 1999

Russia	71–5	Ukraine

Lokomotiv Stadium, Krasnoyarsk
Attendance: 3,000

24 October 1999

Denmark	19–23	Ukraine

Aalborg

13 November 1999

Croatia	42–13	Denmark

Makarska

2 April 2000

Ukraine	17–20	Germany

Odesa

16 April 2000

Russia	89–6	Germany

Stadium Junost, Krasnodar
Attendance: 2,000
Referee: (Netherlands) H. de Ruiter

30 April 2000

Germany	11–38	Croatia

Hamburg

7 May 2000

Germany	19–39	Denmark

Varel

13 May 2000

Denmark	7–104	Russia

Copenhagen

14 May 2000

Croatia	25–9	Ukraine

Makarska

21 May 2000

Russia	Won Russia (Croatia forfeit)	Croatia

Krasnoiarsk

== See also ==
- European Nations Cup First Division 2000
- European Nations Cup Third Division 2000
- European Nations Cup Fourth Division 2000
