= Ukraine Rugby Superliga =

Ukrainian 1st-tier rugby union competition

Superliha Суперліга
- Current season or competition: Ukraine Rugby Superliga 2022
- Sport: Rugby union
- Instituted: 2005; 21 years ago
- Number of teams: 6
- Country: Ukraine
- Holders: RC Olymp (2021)
- Most titles: RC Olymp
- Website: http://rugby.org.ua/

The Rugby Super League (Ukrainian: Суперліга регбі, romanized: Superliha rehbi) is the highest tier of the national rugby union competition in Ukraine. It is organized by the National Rugby Federation of Ukraine.

== Teams ==
In 2021, these teams participated in the Super Liha:

- RC Olymp (Kharkiv)
- RC Kredo-63 (Odesa)
- RC Epokha-Polytechnic (Kyiv)
- Podillya (formerly Obolon-University, Khmelnytskyi)
- RC Polytechnic (Odesa)
- SC Sokil (Lviv)
- RC Antares (Kyiv)

Clubs, participating in the 2nd group - the Higher League (Вища ліга):

- RC Kredo-63-D (Odesa)
- Rebels (Kyiv)
- RC Dnipro
- Kyiv-Darnytsia (Kyiv)
- Kryvyi Rih Rehbi
- RC TEX-A-C (Kharkiv)

Former clubs include Kyiv-based RC Aviator and Argo-NAU.

A new format was introduced for the 2011–12 season. The top nine teams, previously a part of a single division, are divided into two groups, although the league probably lost its professional status. There is also an additional group with four teams battling it out for the 10th to 13th spots.

The 2022 edition was cancelled by the Russian invasion of Ukraine.

== 2011–2012 Ukraine Rugby Superliga ==
=== Group A ===
- RC Dinamo-Center (Tiraspol, Moldova)
- RC Evko-More (Feodosiya)
- RC Obolon-University (Khmelnytskyi)
- RC Olymp (Kharkiv)
- RC TEX-A-C (Kharkiv)

=== Group B ===
- RC Antares (Kyiv)
- RC Epokha-Politekhnik (Kyiv, not to be confused with Politekhnik from Odesa)
- RC Kredo-63 (Odesa)
- SC Sokil (Lviv)

=== Additional group ===
- RC Argo (Kyiv)
- RC Batyari (Lviv)
- RC Polytechnic (Odesa)
- RC Roland (Ivano-Frankivsk)

== See also ==
- Rugby union in Ukraine
