= RC Obolon-University =

Ukrainian rugby union club, based in Khmelnytskyi

- Full name: Rugby Club Obolon-University
- Founded: 1984; 42 years ago
- Location: Khmelnytskyi, Ukraine
- Ground: Lokomotiv Stadium
- Coach: Nikolay Leshchenko
Team kit

RC Obolon-University (Ukrainian: РК Оболонь-Университет, romanized: RK Obolon-Universitet) is a Ukrainian rugby union club in Khmelnytskyi.

== History ==
The club was founded in 1984.
