= RC Kredo-63 =

Ukrainian rugby union club, based in Odesa

- Full name: Rugby Club Kredo-63
- Founded: 1963; 63 years ago (as Avangard)
- Location: Odesa, Ukraine
- Ground: Spartak Stadium (Capacity: 4,800)
- President: (Ukraine) Oleg Etnarovich
- Coach: (Georgia (country)) Zaza Lezhava
- League: Ukraine Rugby Superliga
Team kit

RC Kredo-63 (Ukrainian: РК Кредо-63) is a Ukrainian rugby union club in Odesa. They currently play in the Ukraine Rugby Superliga, the top level of rugby union in Ukraine.

== History ==
The club was founded in 1963.

=== Historical names ===
- 1963-1966 Avangard («Авангард»)
- 1967-1984 SC Yanvarets (СК «Январец»)
- 1985-1988 PO Pressmash (ПО «Прессмаш»)
- 1989-1991 SC Krayan (СК «Краян»)
- 1991-1993 RC Kredo-63 (РК «Кредо 63»)
- 1993-1995 Kredo-Yuzhrekon («Кредо-Южрекон»)
- 1996-2002 Kosmos-Myagkov («Космос-Мягков»)
- 2003-2004 Myagkov-Vitol («Мягков-Витол»)
- 2005-present RC Kredo-63 (РК «Кредо 63»)

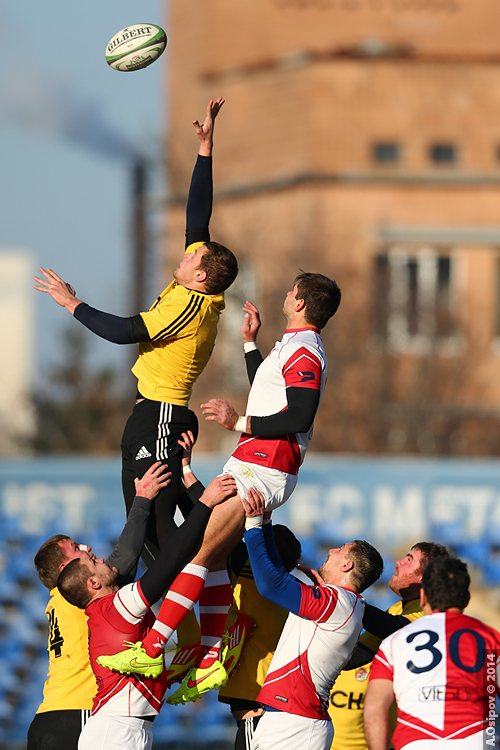
Game with RC Olymp
