= Spartak Stadium (Odesa) =

Stadium in Ukraine

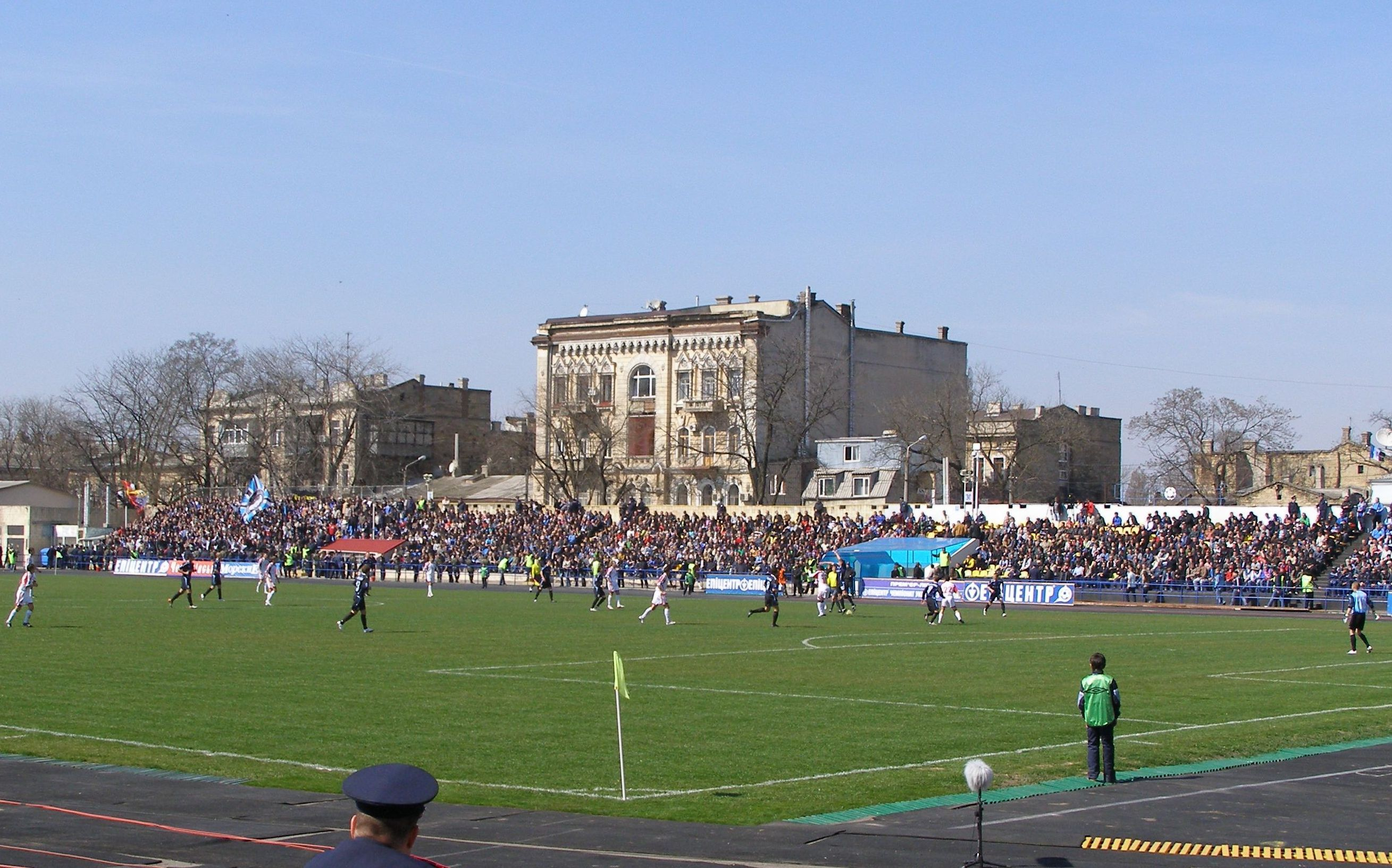
- Interactive map of Spartak Stadium
- Former names: 10th Anniversary of Komsomol
- Location: Odesa, Ukraine
- Coordinates: 46°28′06.20″N 30°44′54.40″E
- Owner: City of Odesa
- Capacity: 4,800
- Surface: Grass
- Field size: 105 m × 68 m (344 ft × 223 ft)

Construction
- Groundbreaking: 1928
- Opened: 1928
- Renovated: 1980s

Tenants
- Football: FC Chornomorets Odesa; FC Avtomobilist Odesa; FC Odesa; FC Zhemchuzhyna Odesa Rugby: Kredo-63

Website
- stadion.od.ua

Spartak Stadium is multi-functional stadium in the city of Odesa, Ukraine.

It is the home ground of football club Real Pharma Odesa and RC Kredo-63. It was the temporary home ground of Chornomorets of the Ukraine Premier League while their home stadium is under reconstruction for Euro 2012.

The stadium was opened in 1928 as a dedication to the 10th anniversary of the Komsomol and was considered the most modern stadium in the city at the time with seating capacity of 10,000 spectators and home to the Odesa city football team.

After World War II, Kharchovyk Odesa (predecessor to Chornomorets) played in the stadium for two years (1945–46). In 1950s, it was a home to football school. In 1960s, here played FC Avtomobilist Odesa that played in lower leagues.

The stadium was in decline and there were attempts in the 1970s to demolish the ground, partially related to construction of the Odesa theatre of Music Comedy. Due to protests of residents, the stadium was preserved. In the 1980s, a pervasive effort was made to reconstruct the ground. After complete reconstruction, two new stands were built instead original horseshoe-shaped and capacity was reduced to 6,000.

Since Ukrainian independence in 1991, the ground has been used by the following clubs: Chornomorets (including reserve and second teams), SK Odesa, Dynamo-SKA, Palmira, Dniester.

The stadium is also a venue for games involving amateur teams from Odesa and its Oblast.
