= RC Polytechnic =

Ukrainian rugby union club, based in Odesa

- Full name: Rugby Club Polytechnic
- Founded: 1965; 61 years ago
- Location: Odesa, Ukraine
- Ground: ONPU Sports Complex
- President: (Ukraine) Viktor Voronov
- Coach: (Ukraine) Vladimir Isakov
Team kit

RC Polytechnic (Ukrainian: РК Политехник, romanized: RK Politekhnik) is a Ukrainian rugby union club in Odesa. They are one of the four teams comprising the additional group in the Ukraine Rugby Superliga.

== History ==
The club was founded in 1965 by O.H. Burdo who was also the first coach. In 1971 and 1977 they finished third in the Ukrainian Championships.
