= RC Epokha-Polytechnic =

Ukrainian rugby union club, based in Kyiv

- Full name: Rugby Club Epokha-Polytechnic
- Founded: 1962; 64 years ago
- Location: Kyiv, Ukraine
- Ground: National Technical University of Ukraine (KPI) Sports Complex
Team kit

RC Epokha-Polytechnic (Ukrainian: РК Эпоха-Политехник, RK Epokha-Politekhnik) is a Ukrainian rugby union club in Kyiv. They currently play in Group B of the Ukraine Rugby Superliga.

== History ==
The club was founded in 1962 as a university team of Kyiv Polytechnic Institute.

== Honors ==
- Ukrainian Championship
  - 1975, 1976, 1989, 1991, 1992, 1993, 1994, 1995, 1996, 1997
