= Rugby union in Ukraine =

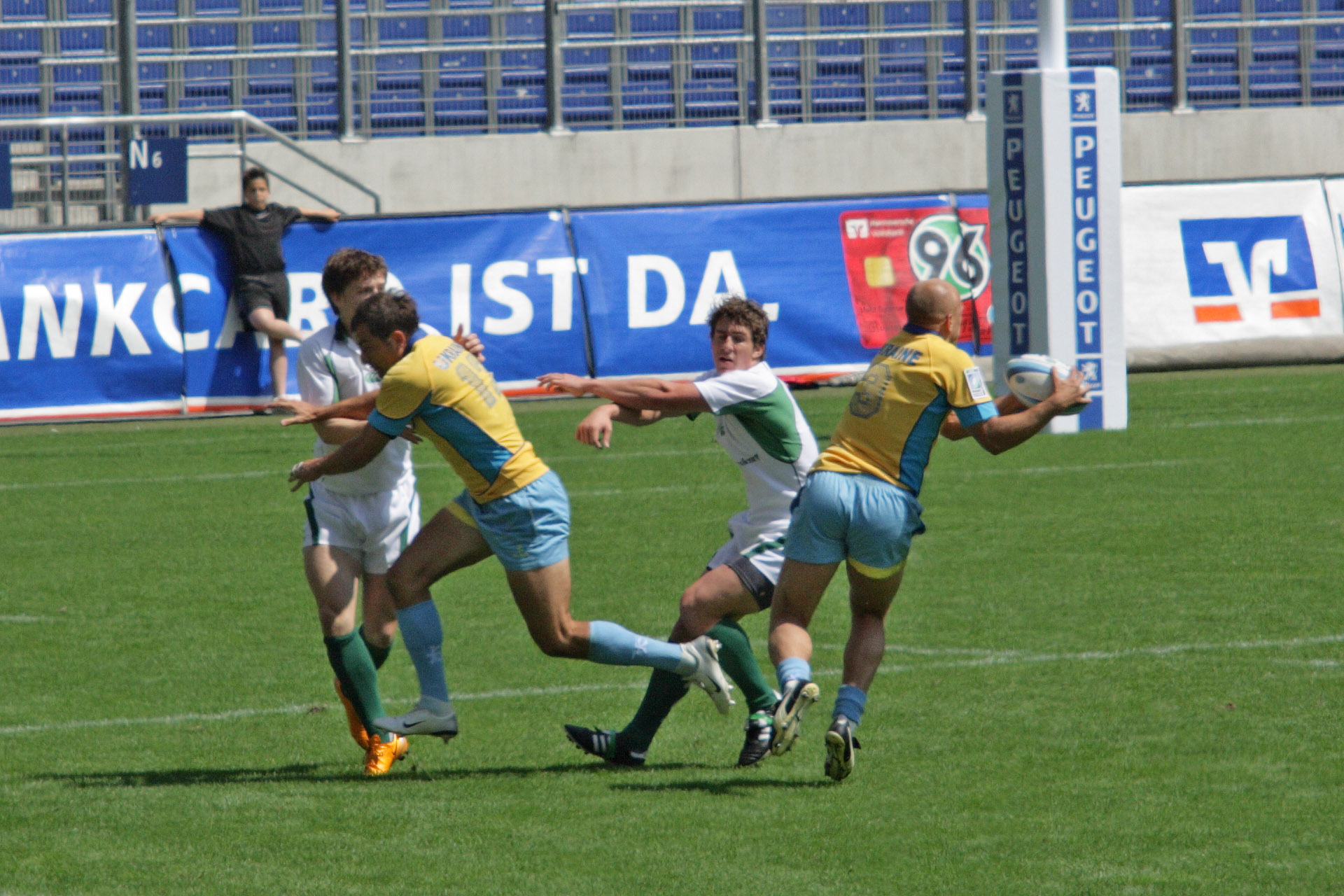
- Oleg Kvasnitsa intercepts the ball from Ireland
- Country: Ukraine
- National team: Ukraine
- First played: 1922
- Registered players: 2,820
- Clubs: 42

National competitions
- Rugby World Cup; Rugby World Cup Sevens; IRB Sevens World Series; European Nations Cup

Rugby union in Ukraine is a minor but growing sport, with a history dating back over six decades.

== Governing body ==
The Ukrainian Union was founded in 1991, and joined the IRB in 1992, after independence. Although there was a union formed in the sixties, it was not considered a proper national union until after the breakup of the USSR.

== History ==
=== Soviet Period ===
Rugby union was played in the Russian Empire as early as in 1908. In 1934 the Moscow Championship was started, and in 1936 the first Soviet Championship took place.

In 1949, rugby union was forbidden in the USSR during the "fight against the cosmopolitanism". The competitions were resumed in 1957, and the Soviet Championship in 1966. In 1975 the Soviet national team played their first match. Ukraine had its own rugby team in the USSR, but it was not treated as a proper national side.

== Post-independence ==
Rugby union arrived in Ukraine during the post-War Soviet period. Ukraine was not a stronghold of rugby in the USSR - the game was mainly played in Russia and Georgia, but it was stronger there, than certain other republics. The game has experienced some growth in the post-independence period, particularly the 1990s, when former USSR team coach Igor Bokov helped run the game there.

Ukrainian rugby has strong ties with the military, with the strongest side being the airforce Aviator Kyiv.

Like many other minor rugby nations, the game tend to be centred on the capital, Kyiv.

Naturally, Ukrainian rugby has been affected by social and economic conditions since independence. In 2006, the Kyiv Post reported that the junior rugby coach for Ukraine had been attacked, being run down, and then shot four times, twice in the head.

== See also ==
- Ukraine national rugby union team
- Ukraine Rugby Superliga
- Soviet Union national rugby union team
