= SC Sokil =

Ukrainian rugby union club, based in Lviv

- Full name: Sport Club Sokil
- Founded: 1977; 49 years ago
- Location: Lviv, Ukraine
- Ground: Yunist Stadium
- President: Volodymyr Artemovych
- Coach: Yury Hrabovskyi
Team kit

SC Sokil (Ukrainian: СК Сокіл; Russian: СК Сокол, romanized: SC Sokol; SC Falcons) is a Ukrainian rugby union club in Lviv.

== History ==
The club was founded in 1977.
