= Vasastaden, Linköping =

City district in Linköping, Sweden

Coordinates: 58°24.960′N 15°37.058′E

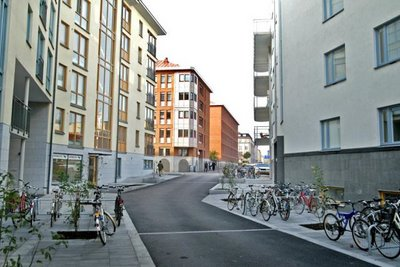
Vasastaden

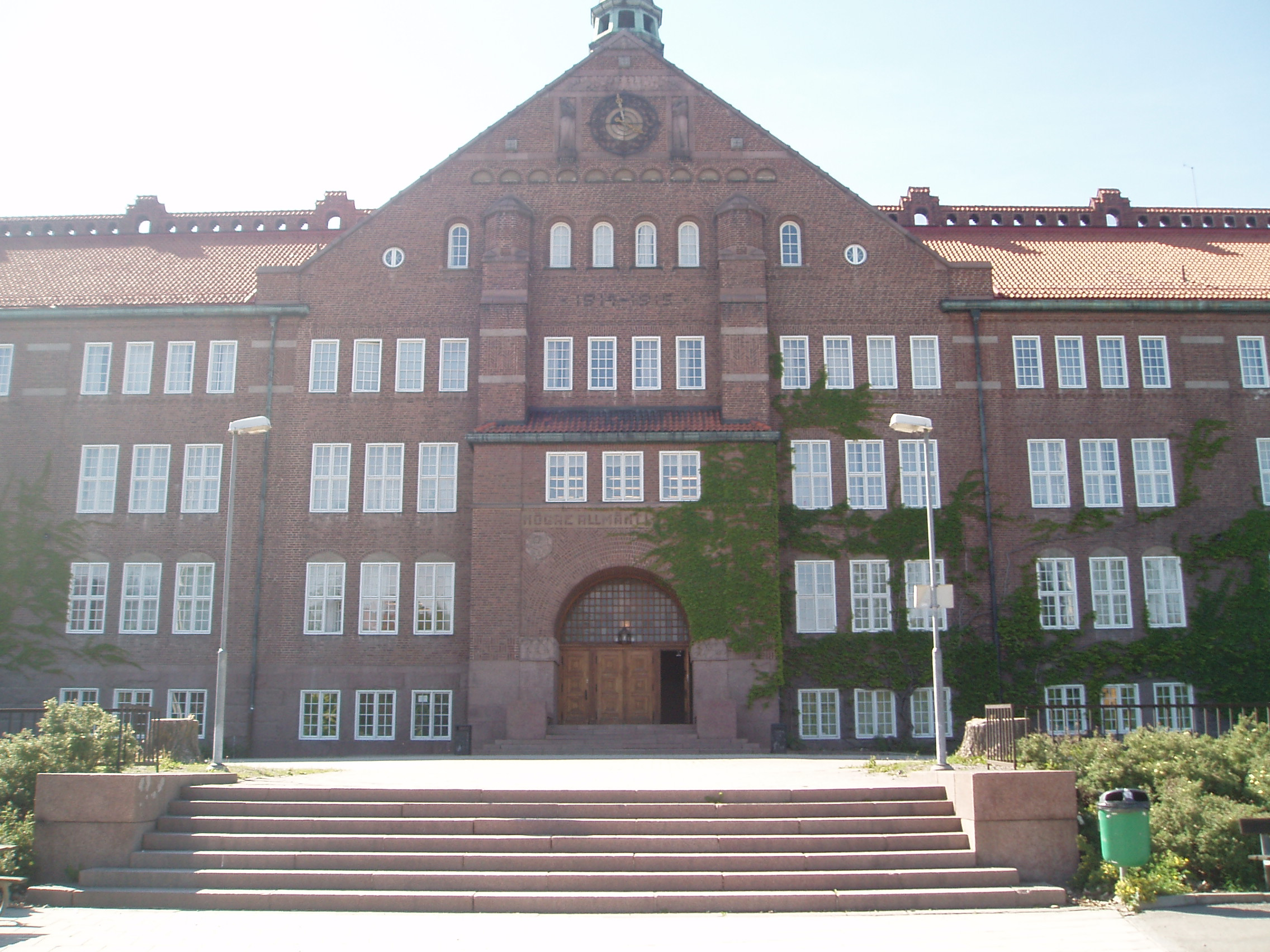
Katedralskolan in Vasastaden

Vasastaden is a city district in Linköping, consisting of mostly apartment buildings with rental apartments, two bedrooms or less. Three-quarters of the dwellings were built before 1960. Some development has taken place in recent years in the neighborhood of Bantorget and a detailed development program for upper Vasastaden has been adopted, which will result in approximately 2,000 residential units, plus commercial, office, craft and healthcare space. Industrigatan, which lies in the expansion of the northern part will become more urban with roundabouts and flowerbeds.

Almost half of the jobs in the area are in the finance and business services as well as trade and communications. The district has plenty of small shops, there are restaurants and grocery stores. In Vasastaden are several high schools, elementary school years 7-9, kindergartens, service and care homes. In the southeastern part of town is the travel center around the railway station.

In 2009 there was 5 550 inhabitants in Vasastaden. By the year 2015 the municipality expects a population increase of over 15%.

Districts adjoining Vasastaden are Skäggetorp, Tornby, Kallerstad, Tannefors, Downtown and Gottfridsberg.
