= Kallerstad =

City district in Linköping, Sweden

Coordinates: 58°25.555′N 15°38.930′E

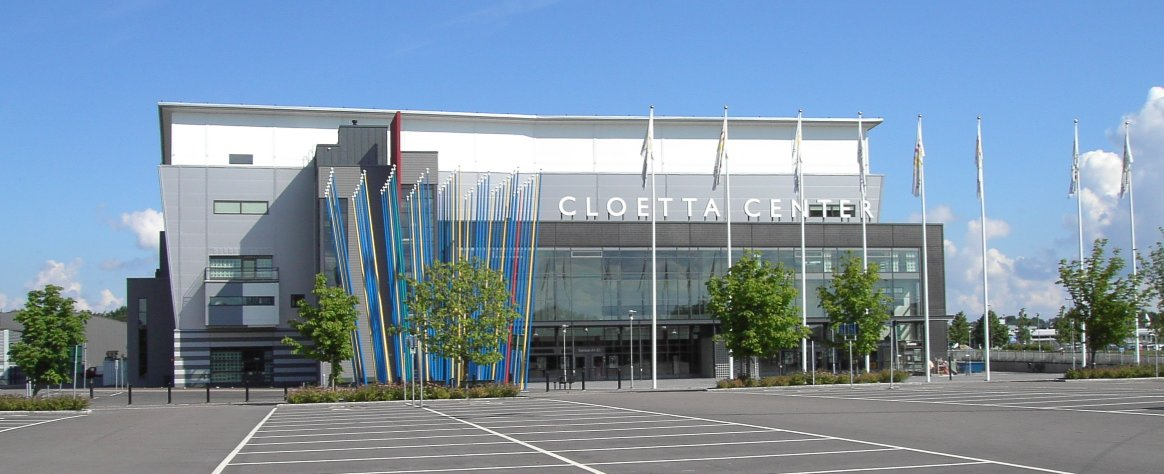
Saab Arena in Kallerstad

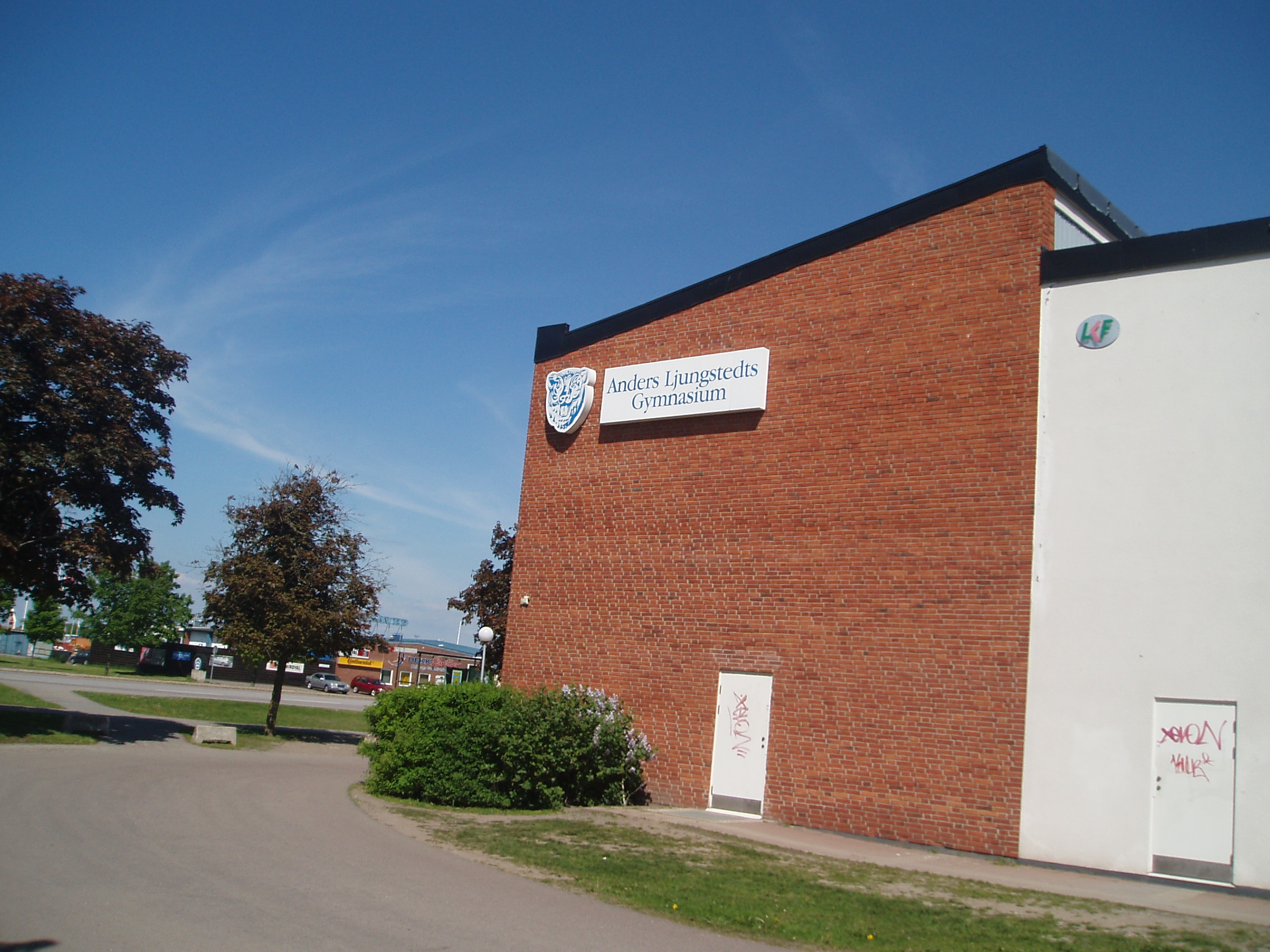
High school Anders Ljungstedts gymnasium

Kallerstad is a city district in Linköping, Sweden, with mostly industrial, commercial and office areas. The district includes Kallerstad, Mörtlösa and Torvinge industrial areas. In 2009, fewer than a hundred people lived in the area. The district is east of Tornby, on the north side of the rail line, and crossed by Kallerstad trail, which is part of the city's outer ring road. About 60 companies have offices in the area. These include Tekniska Verken (the municipal utilities company), Schenker, Urban Partners, Veolia Transport AB and CLM Environmental Engineering.

E4 goes all along the northern part of Kallerstad. In the southwestern part of the area historic Stångebro is located, including Stångebro sports plain and events arena Saab Arena (formerly named Cloetta Center).

Linköping Municipality's vision for the central parts of the city is that the inner city should grow eastward, so that it will include Kallerstad and northern Tannefors. The city's new travel center will be located in the southwestern part of Kallerstad, west of Anders Ljungstedt high school and the city's new fire station will be built at the Kallerstad roundabout.

Districts adjoining Kallerstad are Tallboda, Tannefors, Downtown, Vasastaden and Tornby.
