= Skäggetorp =

City district in Linköping, Sweden

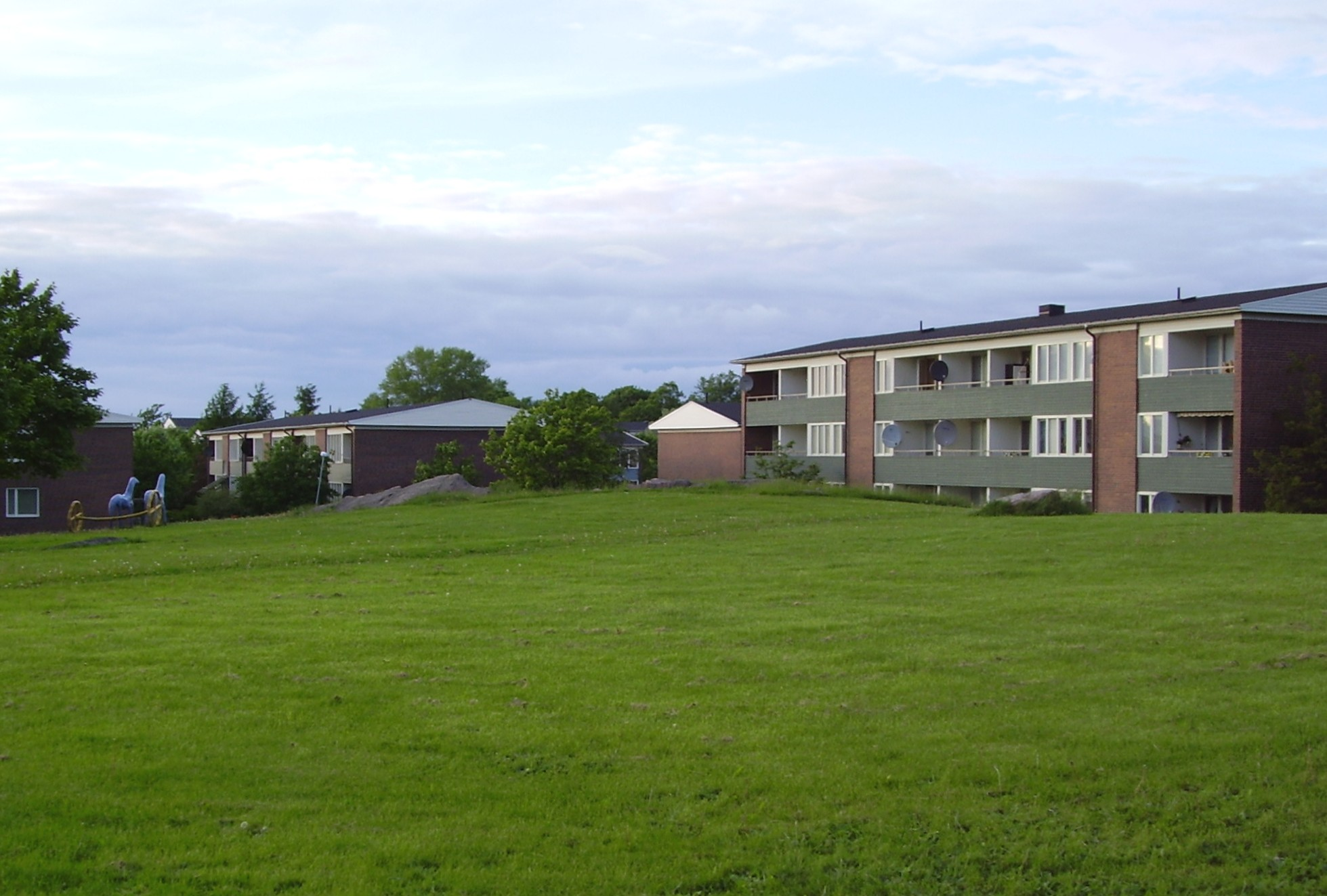
Skäggetorp

Skäggetorp is a city district in Linköping, Sweden, located northwest of downtown. The buildings are mostly two-story and three-story buildings, both condominiums and apartment buildings, which are built around a large center with office buildings, shops, bank, pharmacy and other services. In the area there are medical and dental offices, schools, child care, nursing home, a Swedish Lutheran church, playing fields and Ullevi allotment area.

Construction in Skäggetorp began from the south in the 1960s. In the 1970s, the Ullevi area was built and in 1986, more apartment buildings were constructed at Skäggetorps center. Skäggetorp was part of the Million Programme.

In 1965 the population was only 76. But by 1979, the population of Skäggetorp was 9,901. It then decreased and in 2000 about 7,900 people lived there. But it started to rise again and the population was 8,448 in December 2008. A local council report released in April 2025 said that 9,688 people lived there in 2024, making it the second most populated suburb in the city. Of these, over 5,000 people are men. It also stated that the area was in the top three in Linköping for population increase between 2000 and 2024.

In 2012, 45.1% of the district's residents were of foreign origin. In 2019, the percentage of people with foreign origin had risen to 56.4%. This had gone up further in 2023 to 62%. Since 2014, the most common places of birth outside of Sweden were Syria, Somalia and Iraq.

The unemployment rate among 18 to 64-year-olds in Skäggetorp in March 2020 was at 18.3%. For 18 to 24-year-olds it was 11.9%. In March 2025, it was 20.1%. While for 18 to 24-year-olds it was 12.9%.

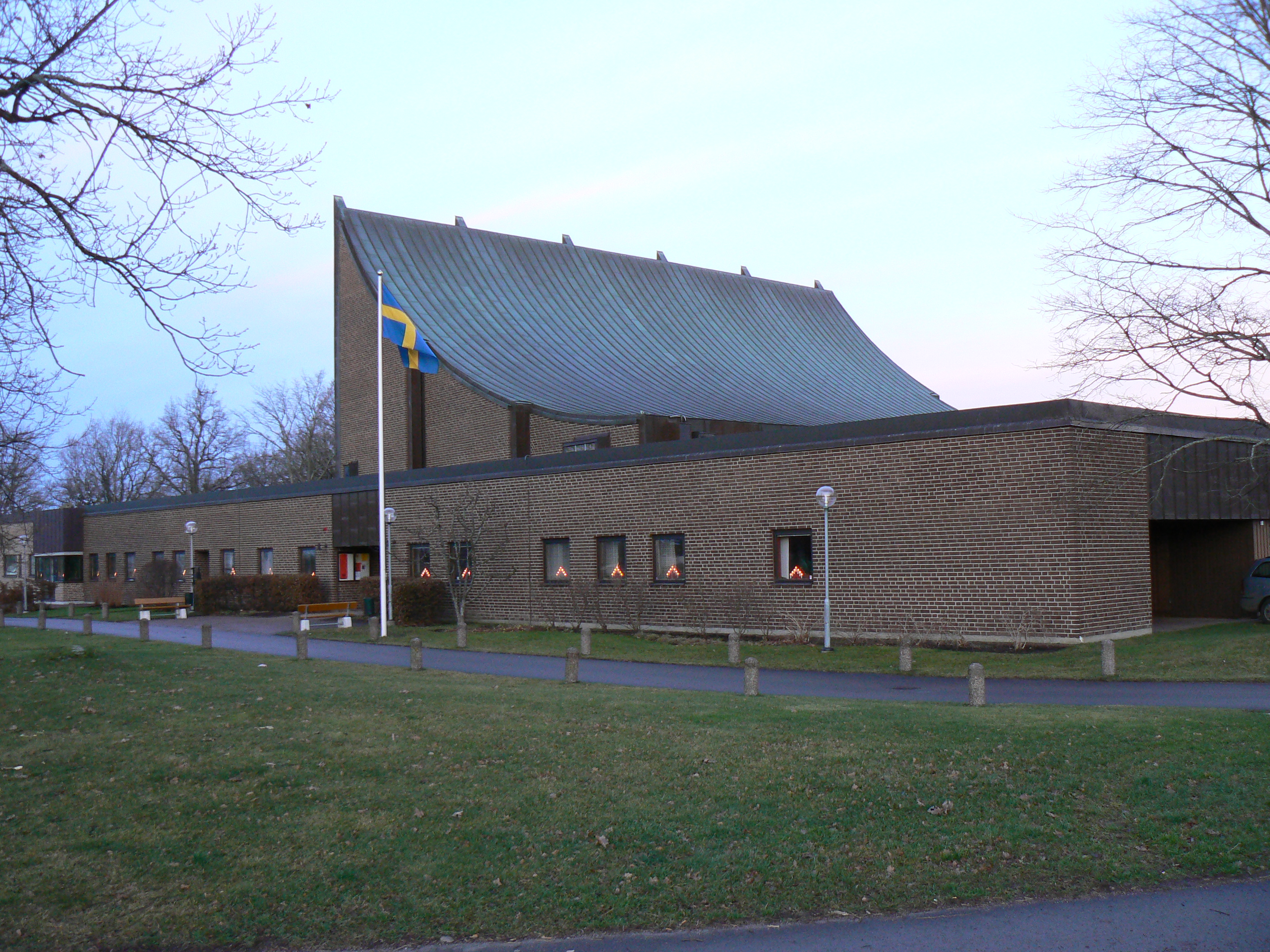
Church in Skäggetorp

Districts adjoining Skäggetorp are Tornby, Gottfridsberg and Ryd.

In its December 2015 report, the Swedish Police placed the district in the most severe category of urban areas with high crime rates. In 2023, a new police report came to the same conclusions about the area.

On 14 April 2022, the far-right Danish politician Rasmus Paludan was to hold a speech about Islam in Skäggetorp, and planned to burn the Quran. But this meeting was cancelled. On 17 April 2022, Paludan announced another meeting but never turned up. On both days riots broke out in response to the anti-Muslim demonstration and several police cars were set on fire. On 22 July 2022, three men received prison sentences related to the violence on 17 April in Skäggetorp. The men were charges with throwing stones at police and police vehicles, two of the men kicked a police vehicle while the third threatened officers and encouraged the gathered crowd to attack the police. These were the first to be sentenced in relation to the events. On 12 December 2022 another five men were sentenced, and this group included minors. Arrests have continued and two years after the events, Sverige Radio reported that 60 people had been sentenced to a total of 129 years imprisonment following riots in Linköping and neighbouring city, Norrköping. Another six, who were all minors at the time of the riots, were all sentenced on 9 July 2024.
