= Elitserien =

Elitserien (literally, "the Elite League") is the name of several Swedish nationwide sport leagues. In many sports, Elitserien is the highest league, with the second highest named Allsvenskan.

Elitserien leagues at present:

- Elitserien (badminton)
- Elitserien (bandy)
- Elitserien (baseball)
- Elitserien (chess)
- Elitserien (men's curling)
- Elitserien (women's curling)
- Elitserien (orienteering)
- Elitserien (men's rugby union)
- Elitserien (women's rugby union)
- Elitserien (speedway)
- Elitserien (tennis)
- Elitserien (men's volleyball)
- Elitserien (women's volleyball)
- Elitserien (water polo)

Leagues formerly named Elitserien:

- Elitserien (1927–35), the highest ice hockey league 1927–1935
- Swedish Hockey League, the highest ice hockey league, named Elitserien 1975–2013
- Swedish Super League (men's floorball), the highest men's floorball league, named Elitserien 1995–2007
- Swedish Super League (women's floorball), the highest women's floorball league, named Elitserien 1997–2012
- Elitserien (men's basketball), the highest men's basketball league 1954–1992, now Basketligan
- Elitserien (women's basketball), the highest women's basketball league 1957–2001, now Basketligan dam
- Elitserien (women's bandy)
- Elitserien (men's table tennis)
- Elitserien (women's table tennis)
- Handbollsligan, called Elitserien between 1990-2016
- Svensk handbollselit, called Elitserien between 1989-2016

== See also ==
- The dictionary definition of elit at Wiktionary
- The dictionary definition of serien at Wiktionary
