= Garnisonen =

City district in Linköping, Sweden

Coordinates: 58°23.793′N 15°37.047′E

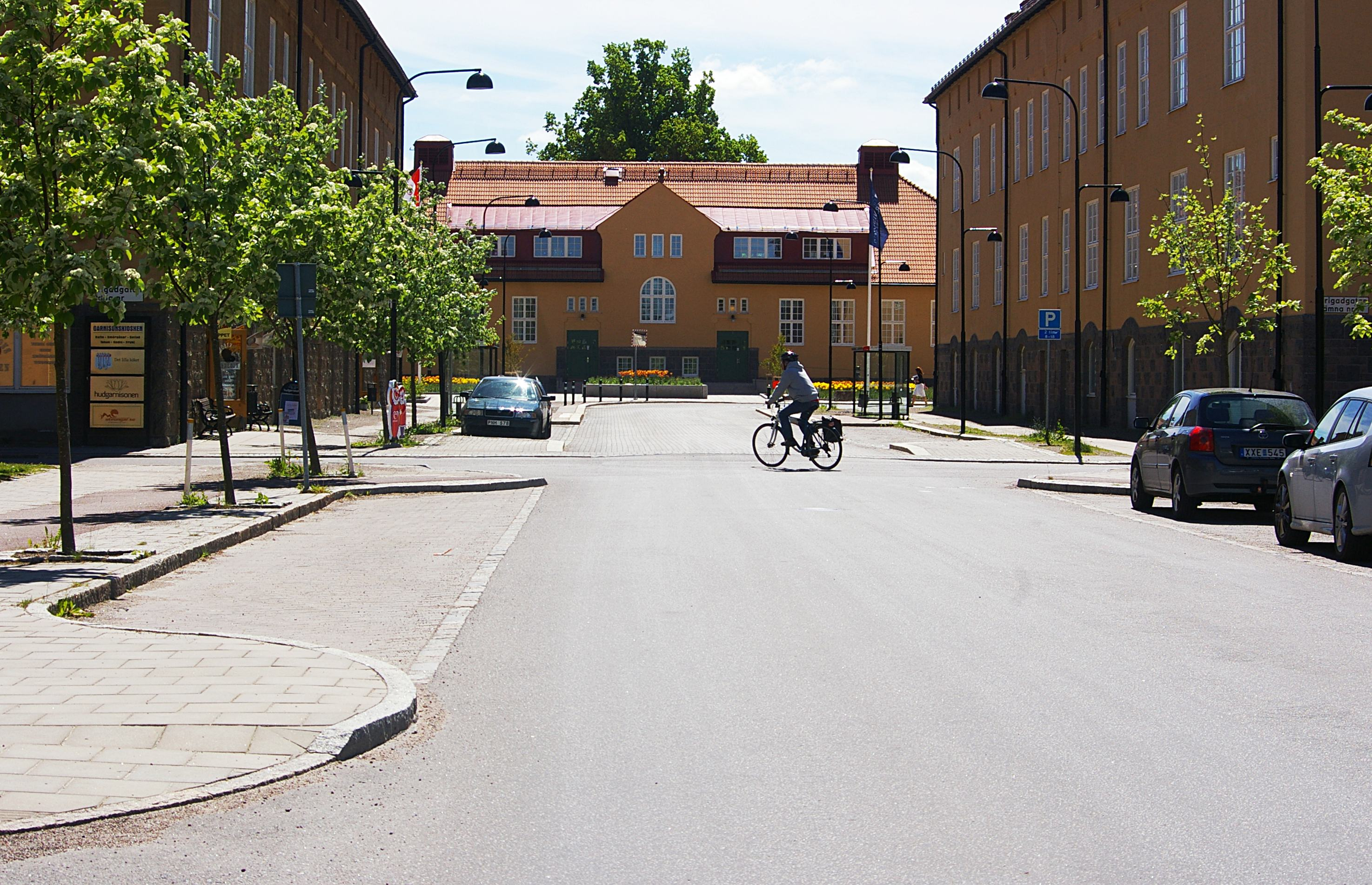
Brigadgatan in Garnisonen

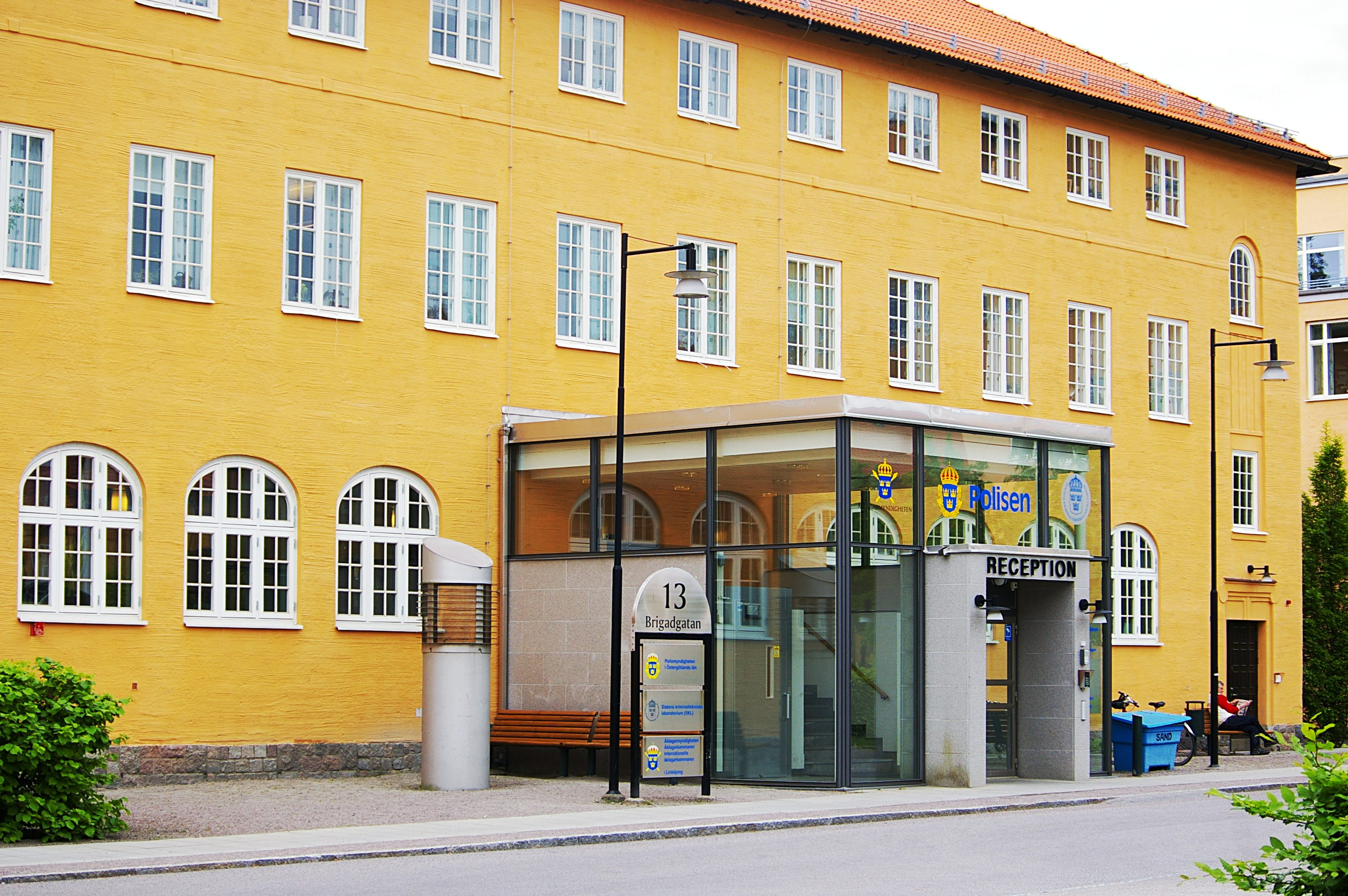
Linköping main police office

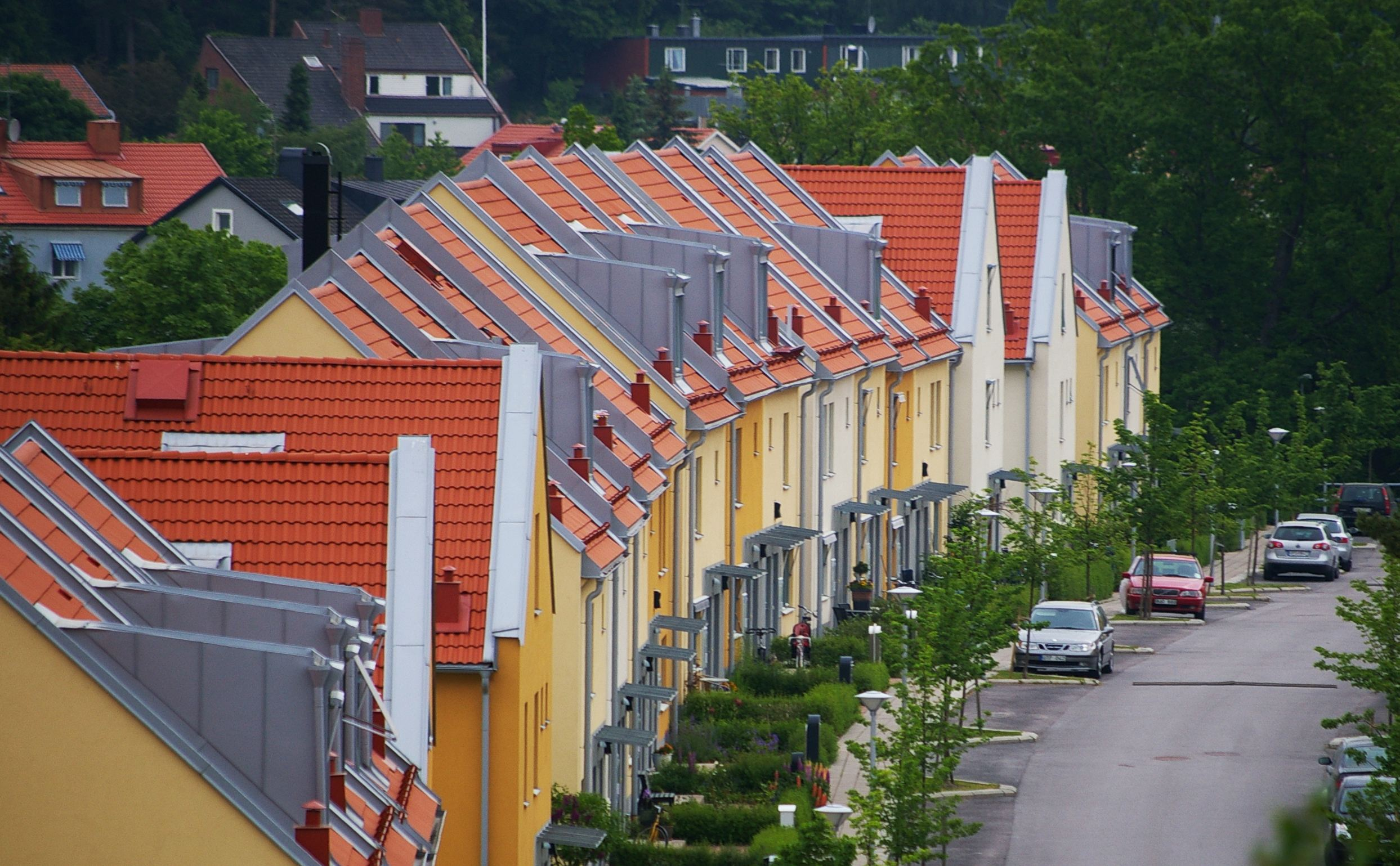
Houses in Garnisonen

Garnisonen ("Garrison") is a city district in Linköping, which was previously the site of the two military units closed down in July 1997, Life Grenadier Regiment (I 4) and Svea Artillery Regiment (A 1). In 2000, the district was formed by division of Ekkällan.

The area is still under development, and there are homes, schools, recreation centers, grocery stores, offices and more. There are also many public sector agencies such as Linköping District Court, Police, Prosecutor's office, Probation Service and the Swedish National Laboratory of Forensic Science. In the western part of the area is a Garrison Museum.

The number of inhabitants in December 2008 was 1070.

Districts adjoining Garnisonen are East Valla, Ekkällan, Ramshäll, Berga and Djurgården. Just south of the district is the nature reserve Tinnerö oak woodlands.
