= Linköpings SF =

Water polo club in Linköping, Sweden

- Full name: Linköpings Simidrottsförening
- Founded: 19 November 2009; 16 years ago
- League: Elitserien
- Based in: Linköping, Sweden
- Arena: Tinnerbäcksbadet, Linköping
- Colours
- Head coach: Ervin Babic
- Website: https://www.facebook.com/lsfpolo/, https://www.svenskalag.se/lsf/

Linköpings Simidrottsförening, commonly known as Linköpings SF or LSF, is a water polo club based in Linköping, Östergötland, Sweden, and formed on 19 November 2009. Linköpings SF's colours are white, blue and orange. The club is currently playing in Elitserien, the highest water polo league in Sweden.

In 2009, the water polo team of Linköpings ASS left the swimming club and started Linköpings VF. In the 2014–2015 season, Linköpings SF finished as runners-up after losing the final against Järfälla Sim, with 10–13. On 14 May 2016, Linköpings SF became Swedish champions for the first time by winning Elitserien by beating Stockholmspolisen with 8–3 in the final game.

== Arena ==
LSF plays their home matches at Tinnerbäcksbadet, Linköping.

== Current squad ==
The team roster for 2016/2017 season

(Croatia) (Head coach) Ervin Babic

Nationality Position Name: (Sweden) (GK) Markus Zdolsek; (Sweden) (GK) Gunnar Ekström; (Sweden) (CB) John Sandlund; (Sweden) (right winger/CB) Georg Zdolsek; (Sweden) (right winger/right flat) Arun Uppugunduri; (Sweden) (winger) Henrik Ernstsson; (Sweden) (CB) Joel Berglez; (Sweden) (winger) Sefin Ismail; (Sweden) (CB) Jakop Krüger; (Sweden) (winger) Erik Andersson	Nationality Position Name: (Sweden) (England) (Center/right flat) Niklas Chesterton Greberg; (Sweden) (left flat/left winger) Hans Zdolsek; (Sweden) (England) (left flat) Christopher Vang; (Sweden) (left flat) Henrik Palm; (Sweden) (Center/Winger) Carl Simon Ellingsen Larsson; (Sweden) (right flat) Loke Gulwer; (Sweden) (Croatia) (winger/CB) Toni Nikolic; (Sweden) . (winger) Silvije Cvijetic; (Ukraine) (Center/Winger) Vadym Sokol; (Sweden) (CB/Winger) Timothéus Papadopoulos

== Honours ==
- Elitserien:
  - Winners (1): 2016
  - Runners-up (2): 2013, 2015
- Swedish Beach Water Polo Championships:
  - Winners (3): 2014, 2015, 2016
  - Runners-up (1): 2013

== Records ==
- Largest league victory: 32–5 v SKK, 23 January 2016
- Most goals scored from one player in the same game: 8 goals, Henrik Palm, v KSS, 12 December 2015
- Most goals scored in one season: 43 goals, Henrik Palm, season 2015/2016
