= Ekkällan =

City district in Linköping, Sweden

Coordinates: 58°24.100′N 15°37.280′E

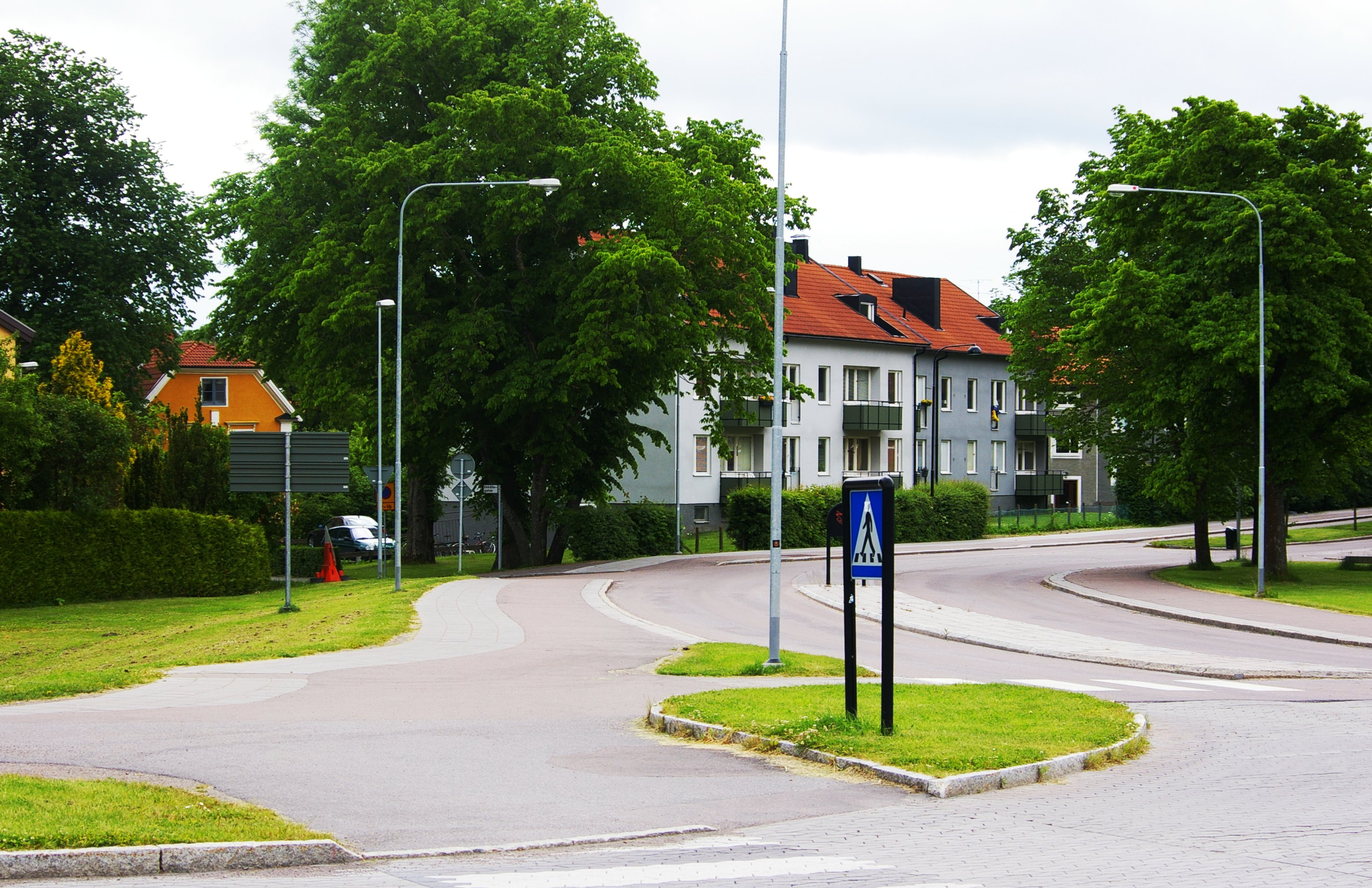
Garnisonsvägen in Ekkällan.

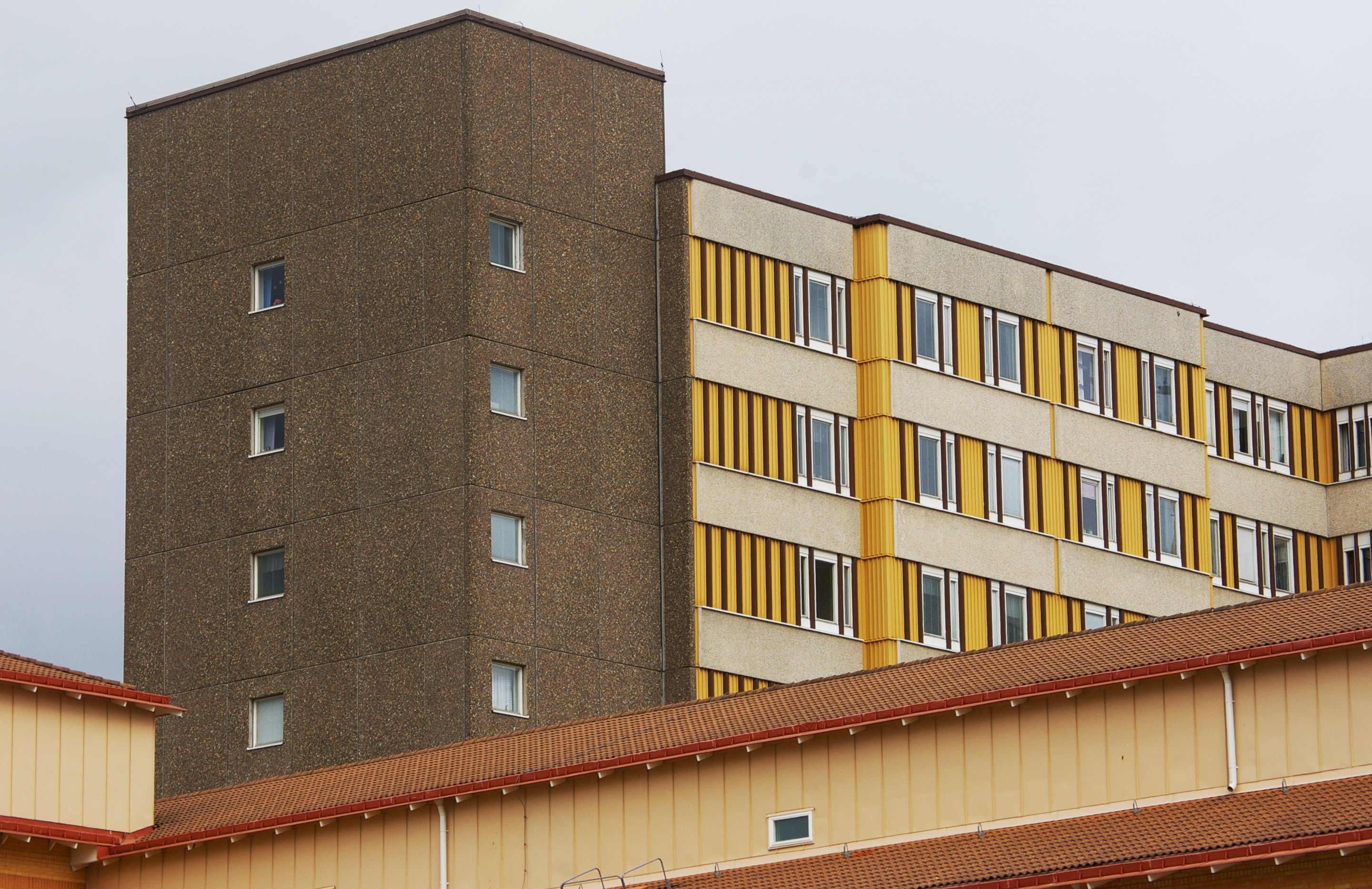
Linköping University Hospital, situated in Ekkällan

Ekkällan is a city district of Linköping, Sweden. In 2000 the former Ekkällan district was split and Garnisonen was formed, while a few blocks were transferred to the district of Inner City.

The area includes Linköping University Hospital, housing, service apartments for seniors, pre-schools, grocery stores, restaurants, pharmacies, emergency center and more. Population in December 2008 was 1 646.

Ekkällan adjoining districts of East Valla, Downtown, Ramshäll, Garnisonen and Berga. The area South Ekkällan is not located in the district Ekkällan, but in the nearby Garnisonen.
