= Tomas Nord =

Swedish ice hockey player (born 1958)

- Born: July 18, 1958 (age 67) Landsbro, Sweden
- Height: 5 ft 9 in (175 cm)
- Weight: 172 lb (78 kg; 12 st 4 lb)
- Position: Defence
- Shot: Left
- Played for: Leksands IF; AIK IF
- Playing career: 1976–1991

Tomas Mikael Nord (born July 18, 1958) is a retired Swedish professional ice hockey defenceman. He played fifteen seasons in Elitserien, for Leksands IF and AIK IF. He won the Swedish Championship in 1984 with AIK.

== Playing career ==
Nord started playing hockey in Boro/Landsbro IF, debuting at senior level during the 1973–74 season in Sweden's Division 2. During the 1974–75 season he played his second season for Boro/Landsbro in Division 2, and made his international debut for Sweden's U16 team, as well as representing Småland at the 1974 TV-pucken where he won the Lill-Strimmastipendiet (scholarship; namesake of Lennart "Lill-Strimma" Svedberg), awarded to the tournament's best defenceman.

For the 1975–76 season Nord signed with Leksands IF to play junior hockey with Leksands' U20 team. The following season Nord was brought up to Leksands' senior team in Elitserien, playing seven regular season games and five playoff games. In 1977–78, he earned a more regular position on Leksands' defence, playing 33 games and scoring twelve points. During the season, Nord also played three international games for Sweden's U20 team. In his second full season with Leksand Nord again scored twelve points and made his senior international debut with Tre Kronor, playing two games. Leksand again qualified for the playoffs, where they lost in the semifinals against MoDo AIK. After having a mediocre 1979–80 season, scoring only one goal and seven points in 34 games and going pointless in two playoff games, Nord went on to improve his points total for three consecutive seasons, including scoring a career high fourteen goals and 27 points during the 1982–83 season. Nord scored a career high four goals in one game during the 1982–83 season in a 9–2 win over Brynäs IF. Despite Nord's development into a top offensive defenceman in Elitserien, Leksand failed to qualify for the playoffs during these three season and Nord left the team to sign with AIK for the 1983–84 season.

While playing for AIK Nord's production dropped as he only scored four goals and registered 18 points during his first season. In the playoffs, AIK won the best-of-three semifinal series two to one against Södertälje SK, and won the Swedish Championship in the final series against Djurgårdens IF, with Nord scoring the game-winning goal in the decisive game three of the series. In the six playoff games, Nord scored three goals and four points, which made him the highest scoring defenceman in the playoffs.

Between 1992 and 1995, Nord served as an assistant coach to Wayne Fleming in Leksand.

== Career statistics ==
=== Regular season and playoffs ===
			Regular season					Playoffs
Season	Team	League	GP	G	A	Pts	PIM	GP	G	A	Pts	PIM
1976–77	Leksands IF	SEL	7	0	1	1	2	5	0	0	0	0
1977–78	Leksands IF	SEL	33	7	5	12	24	—	—	—	—	—
1978–79	Leksands IF	SEL	29	9	3	12	25	3	0	0	0	2
1979–80	Leksands IF	SEL	34	1	6	7	19	2	0	0	0	0
1980–81	Leksands IF	SEL	29	5	6	11	22	—	—	—	—	—
1981–82	Leksands IF	SEL	36	10	8	18	14	—	—	—	—	—
1982–83	Leksands IF	SEL	29	14	13	27	6	—	—	—	—	—
1983–84	AIK IF	SEL	34	4	14	18	8	6	3	1	4	0
1984–85	AIK IF	SEL	32	9	11	20	18	—	—	—	—	—
1985–86	Leksands IF	SEL	35	5	8	13	12	—	—	—	—	—
1986–87	Leksands IF	SEL	32	2	8	10	12	—	—	—	—	—
1987–88	Leksands IF	SEL	34	3	13	16	12	3	0	1	1	0
1988–89	Leksands IF	SEL	36	9	10	19	10	7	0	1	1	2
1989–90	Leksands IF	SEL	34	1	10	11	10	3	0	0	0	0
1990–91	Leksands IF	SEL	21	1	2	3	8	—	—	—	—	—
SEL totals			455	80	118	198	202	29	3	3	6	4
