= Fredrik Bringnäs =

Swedish ice hockey player

- Born: February 4, 1988 (age 37) Linköping, Sweden
- Height: 6 ft 0 in (183 cm)
- Weight: 187 lb (85 kg; 13 st 5 lb)
- Position: Defence
- Shot: Left
- SEL team: Linköpings HC
- Playing career: 2007–2012

Fredrik Bringnäs (born February 4, 1988, in Linköping) is a former Swedish ice hockey player.

== Career statistics ==
			Regular season					Playoffs
Season	Team	League	GP	G	A	Pts	PIM	GP	G	A	Pts	PIM
2003–04	Linköping HC J18	J18 Allsvenskan	13	0	1	1	2	—	—	—	—	—
2004–05	Linköping HC J18	J18 Elit	17	1	1	2	31	—	—	—	—	—
2004–05	Linköping HC J20	J20 SuperElit	4	0	0	0	0	—	—	—	—	—
2005–06	Linköping HC J18	J18 Elit	26	4	6	10	6	—	—	—	—	—
2005–06	Linköping HC J20	J20 SuperElit	4	0	0	0	2	4	0	0	0	2
2006–07	Linköping HC J20	J20 SuperElit	38	1	6	7	20	5	0	1	1	2
2007–08	Linköping HC J20	J20 SuperElit	38	7	6	13	28	5	0	0	0	0
2007–08	Linköping HC	Elitserien	1	0	0	0	0	—	—	—	—	—
2007–08	Tranås AIF	Division 1	2	0	1	1	2	—	—	—	—	—
2008–09	Mjölby HC	Division 1	34	8	8	16	16	—	—	—	—	—
2009–10	HC Vita Hästen	Division 1	14	0	0	0	4	—	—	—	—	—
2010–11	HF Linköping	Division 2	17	3	2	5	—	—	—	—	—	—
2012–13	HF Linköping	Division 3	1	0	0	0	0	—	—	—	—	—
Elitserien totals			1	0	0	0	0	—	—	—	—	—
Division 1 totals			50	8	9	17	22	—	—	—	—	—
