= Hejdegården =

City district in Linköping, Sweden

Coordinates: 58.403402°N 15.635283°E

Hejdegården is a city district in Linköping. Adjoining districts are Johannelund, Downtown, Tannefors, Vimanshäll and Ramshäll.
