= Linköpings Rugbyklubb =

- Founded: 1998
- Location: Linköping, Sweden
- Ground(s): Gamla Motorstadion
- Chairman: Mike Rowley
- Coach(es): Kenny Simpson
- League(s): To be decided
Team kit

Linköpings Rugbyklubb is a Swedish rugby club in Linköping. They currently play in Mälardalsserien, the second level of rugby in Sweden.

== History ==
The club was founded in 1998 by Jörgen Nord. It started up as a university team but soon found other rugby lovers outside of Campus. Due to low numbers in the first and recent years, they have joined forces with Norrköping Trojan at senior level. The team has just celebrated its 15th year, marked with a dinner and prize giving.
