= Östra Valla =

City district in Linköping, Sweden

Coordinates: 58°24′15″N 15°35′33″E

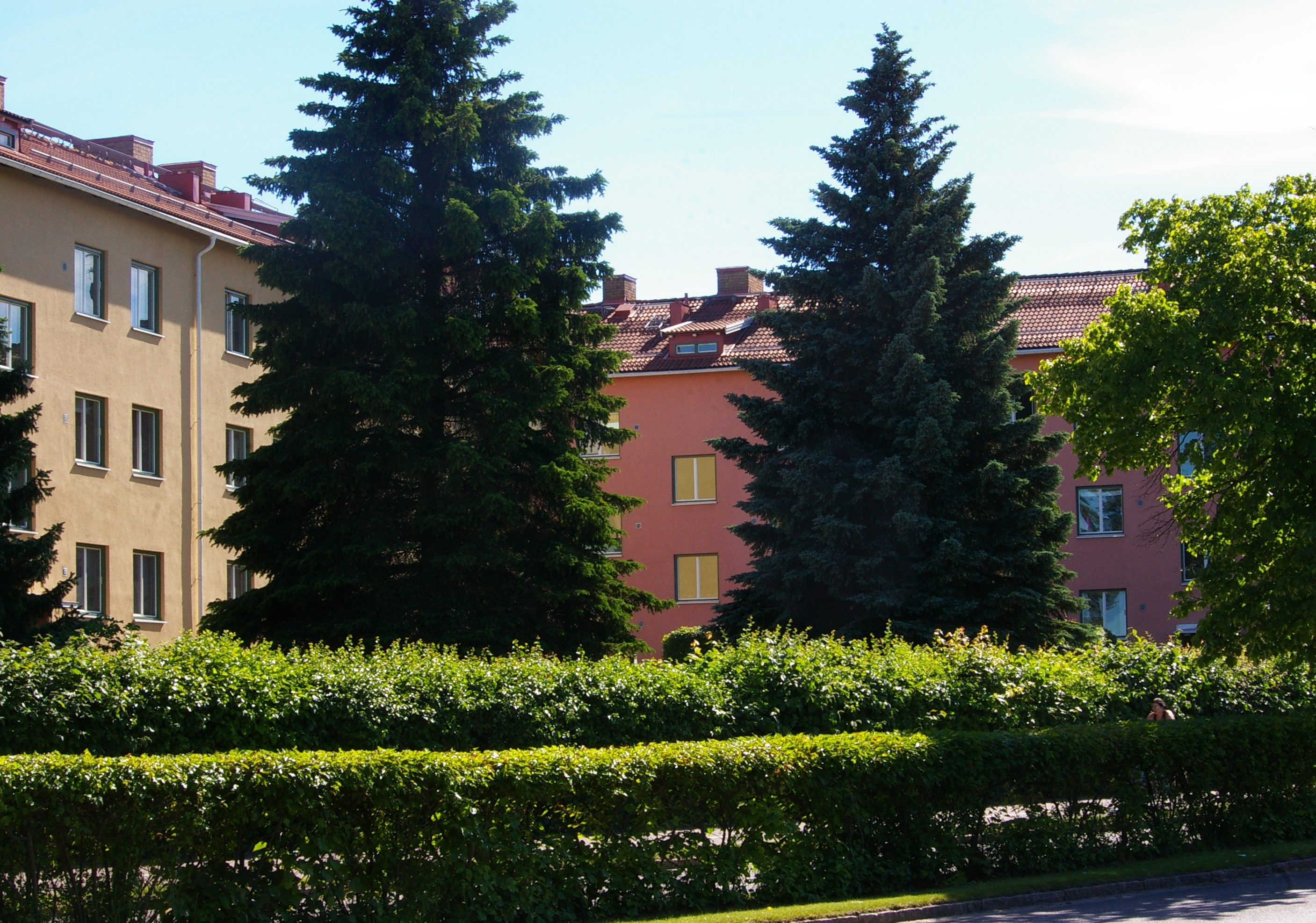
HSB houses in Valla

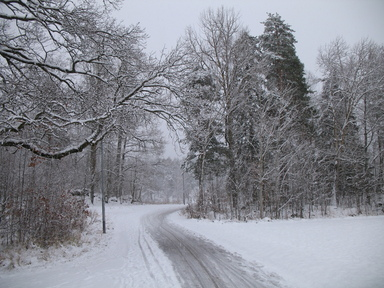
Vallaskogen in wintertime.

Östra Valla is a city district in western Linköping. It includes Griftegård, the Valla wood, and a business park. Östra Valla adjoins the districts West Valla, Gottfridsberg, Downtown, Djurgården, Ekkällan and Garnisonen.

Östra Valla lies near Downtown.
