= Dead Soul (band) =

Swedish rock band

Dead Soul was a rock band, or, as they called themselves, "Dark Electronic Industrial Doom Blues band" from Linköping, Sweden. Their first album In the Darkness reached #49 on Swedish Toplist (Sverigetopplistan).

They have toured frequently with rock band Ghost throughout Sweden.

== Discography ==
Studio albums

- In the Darkness (2013)
- The Sheltering Sky (2015)
