= Tornby =

Industrial area in Linköping, Sweden

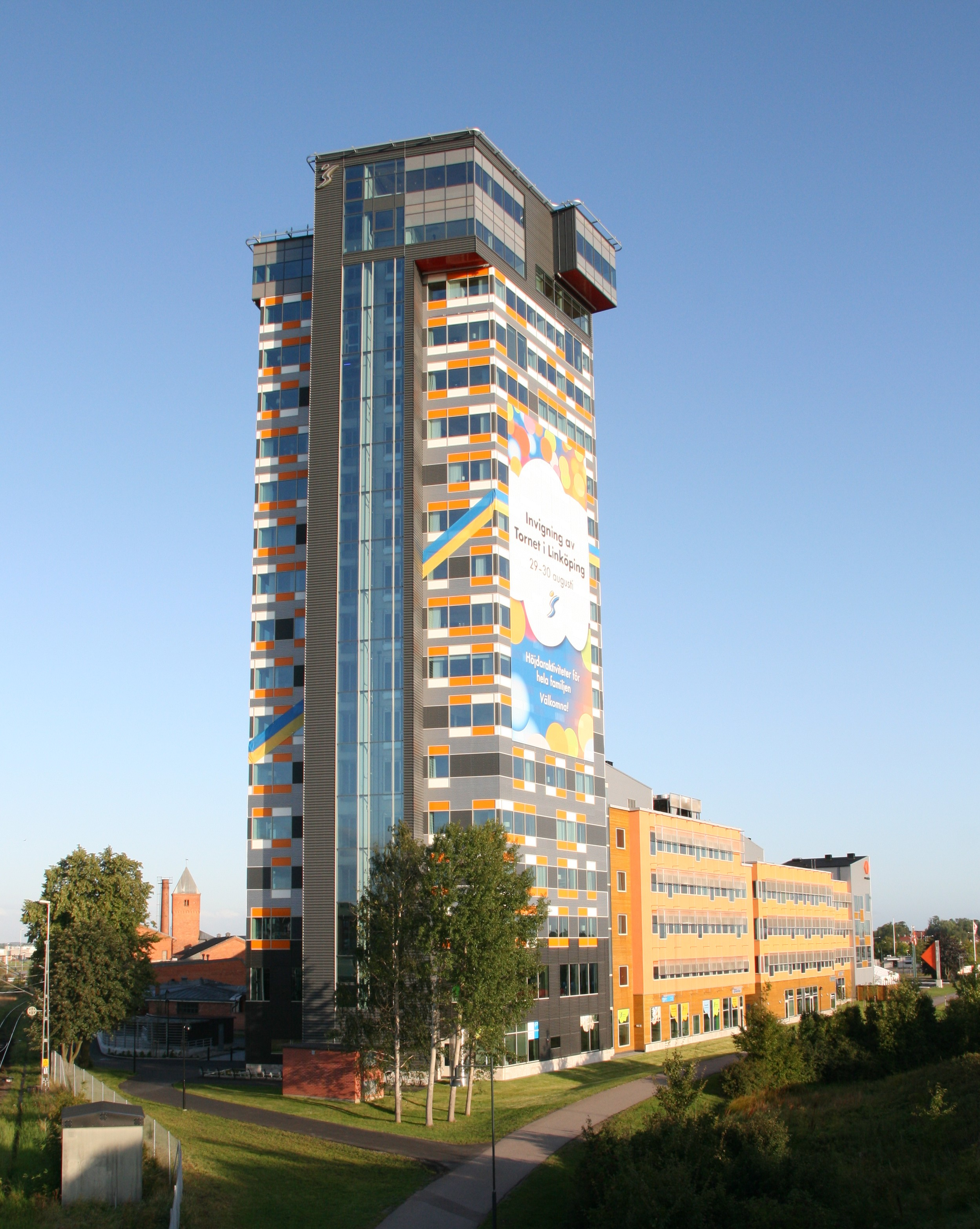
Tornet Tornby

Tornby is a city district and an industrial area in the north of Linköping, where one of Sweden's largest shopping malls is located. Tornby is limited to the south by the railway, in the north by the E4 motorway, to the west by Skäggetorp and Bergsvägen, which is the middle of the three freeway exits and in the east of Stångån. East of Stångån the industrial area Kallerstad is located.

Tornby shopping center, which forms the northwest corner of Tornby, is now the second largest shopping mall after Kungens kurva in Stockholm. Some of the shops and restaurants in Tornby shopping center are contained in one building, IKANO house. At Nygårds roundabout on Bergsvägen close to IKEA and auto parts store Biltema, the work of art Circulation II (2006) by Stina Opitz is located. This is the original roundabout dog.

In the southern part of Tornby, next to a bridge over the railway, municipal housing company Stångåstaden's office is located (under construction 2009), with 19 floors and 64 meters, it is the highest house in Linköping. It is not the highest building, however, because the tower of Linköping Cathedral is 109 meters high.

== See also ==
- Törnby
