= Linköping =

City in Östergötland, Sweden

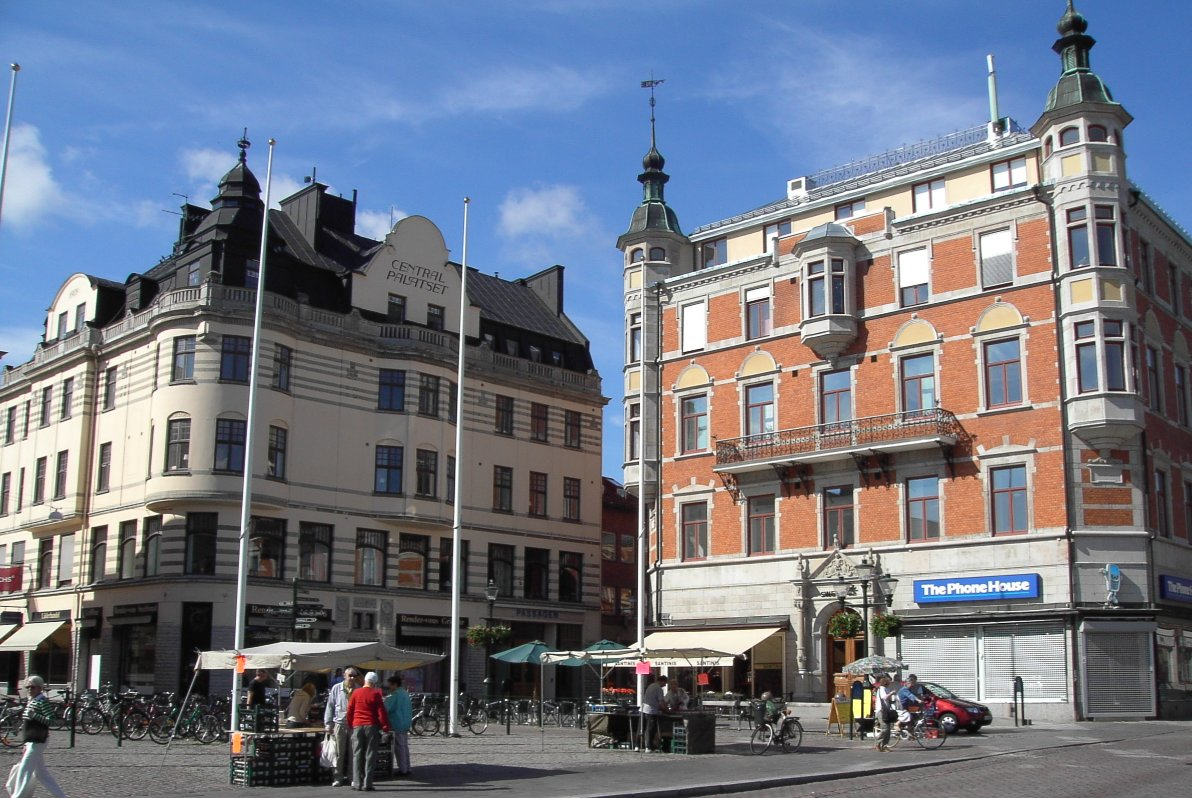
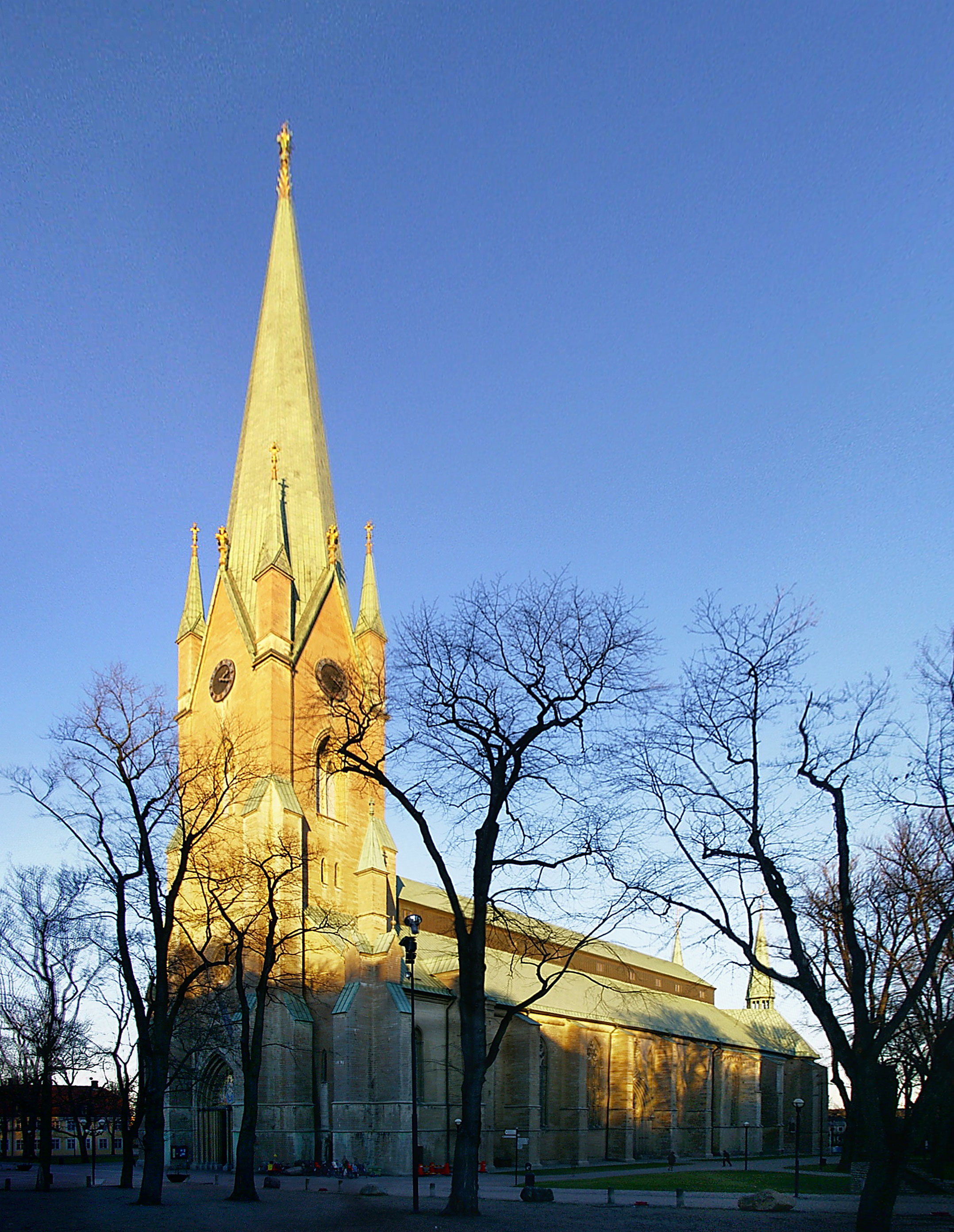
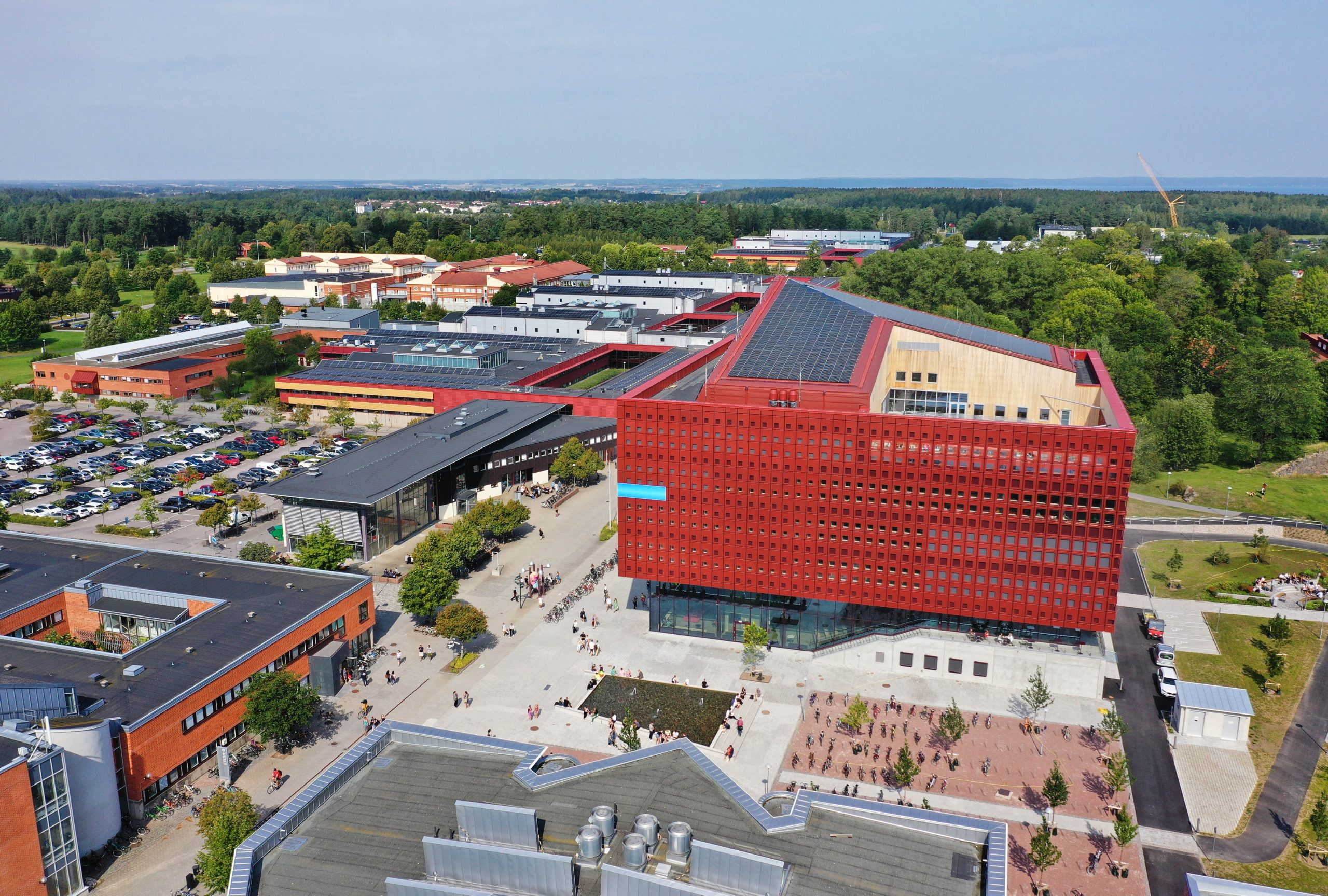
- Main street in Linköping city Linköping Cathedral Linköping University
- Nickname: Flygstaden (The flight city)
- Motto: Linköping – where ideas come to life
- Location within Östergötland Location within Sweden
- Coordinates: 58°24′57″N 15°37′31″E
- Country: Sweden
- Province: Östergötland
- County: Östergötland County
- Municipality: Linköping Municipality
- Founded: 12th century

Area
  - City: 42.16 km^{2} (16.28 sq mi)
- Elevation: 45 m (148 ft)

Population (31 December 2022)
  - City: 166,673
  - Density: 3,953/km^{2} (10,240/sq mi)
  - Metro: 158,841
- Time zone: UTC+1 (CET)
  - Summer (DST): UTC+2 (CEST)
- Postal code: 58x xx
- Area code: (+46) 13
- Website: www.linkoping.se

Linköping (/ˈlɪnʃəpɪŋ/ LIN-shə-ping, Swedish: [ˈlɪ̂nːˌɕøːpɪŋ]) is a city in southern Sweden, with around 167,000 inhabitants as of 2024. It is the seat of Linköping Municipality and the capital of Östergötland County. Linköping is also the episcopal see of the Diocese of Linköping (Church of Sweden) and is well known for its cathedral. Linköping is the center of an old cultural region and celebrated its 700th anniversary in 1987. Dominating the city's skyline from afar is the steeple of the cathedral (Domkyrkan).

Nowadays, Linköping is known for its university and its high-technology industry. Linköping wants to create a sustainable development of the city and therefore planned to become a carbon-neutral community by 2025. Located on the Östergötland Plain, Linköping is closely linked to Norrköping, roughly 40 kilometres (25 mi) to the east, near the sea.

== History ==
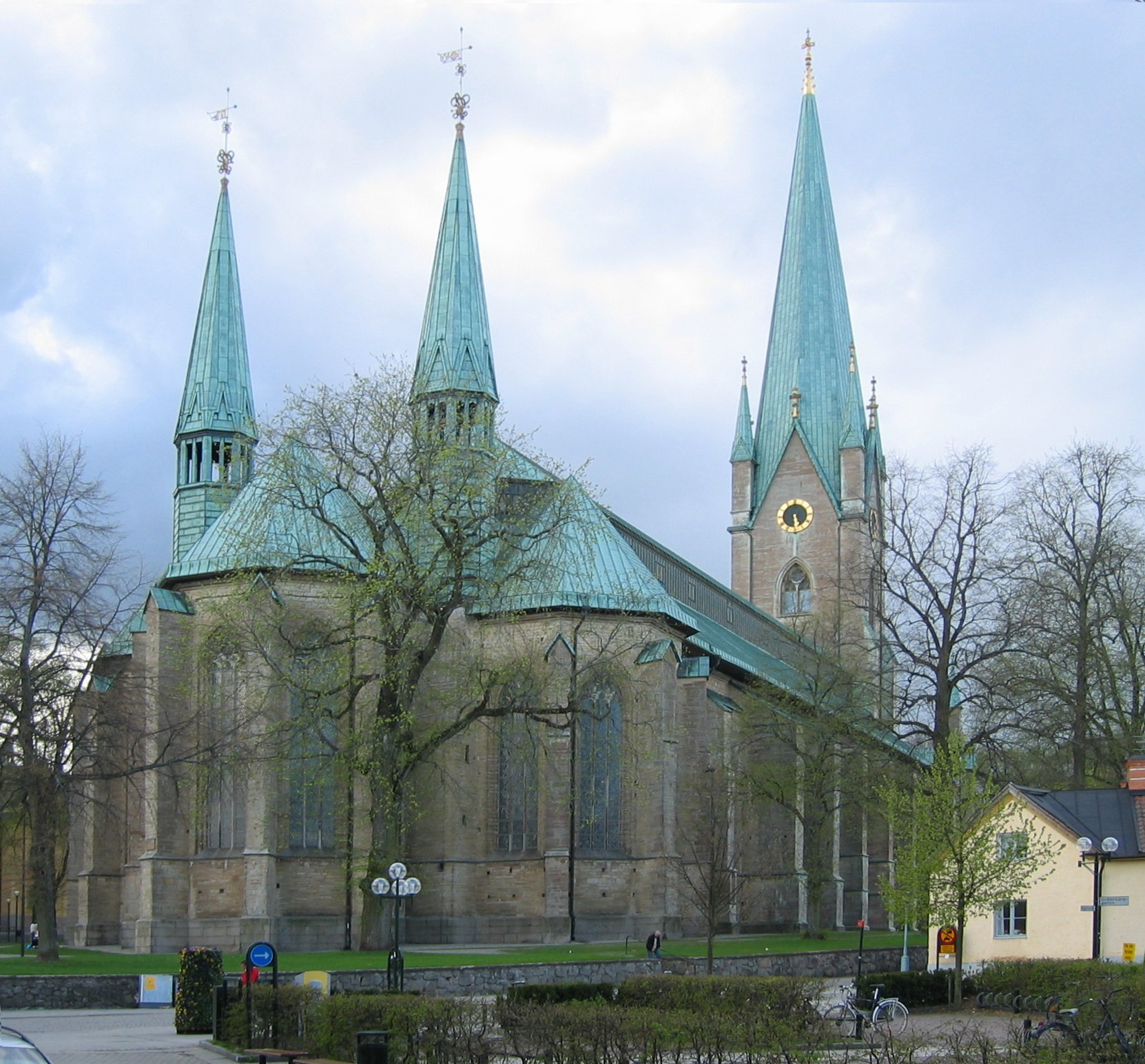
Linköping Cathedral seen from the east

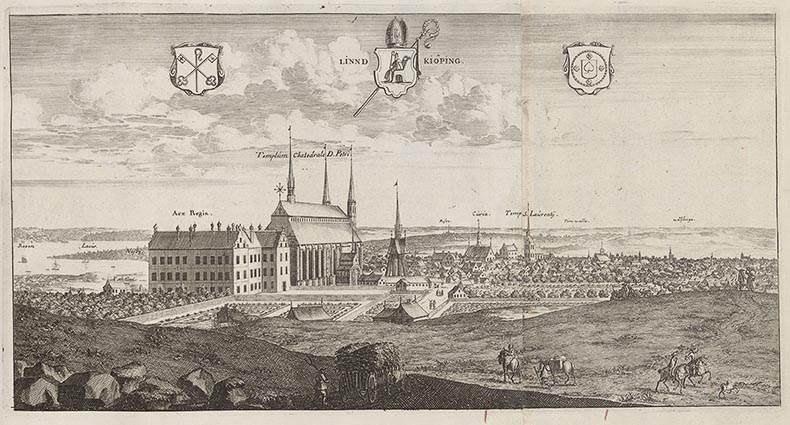
Linköping seen from West, in the Suecia Antiqua et Hodierna

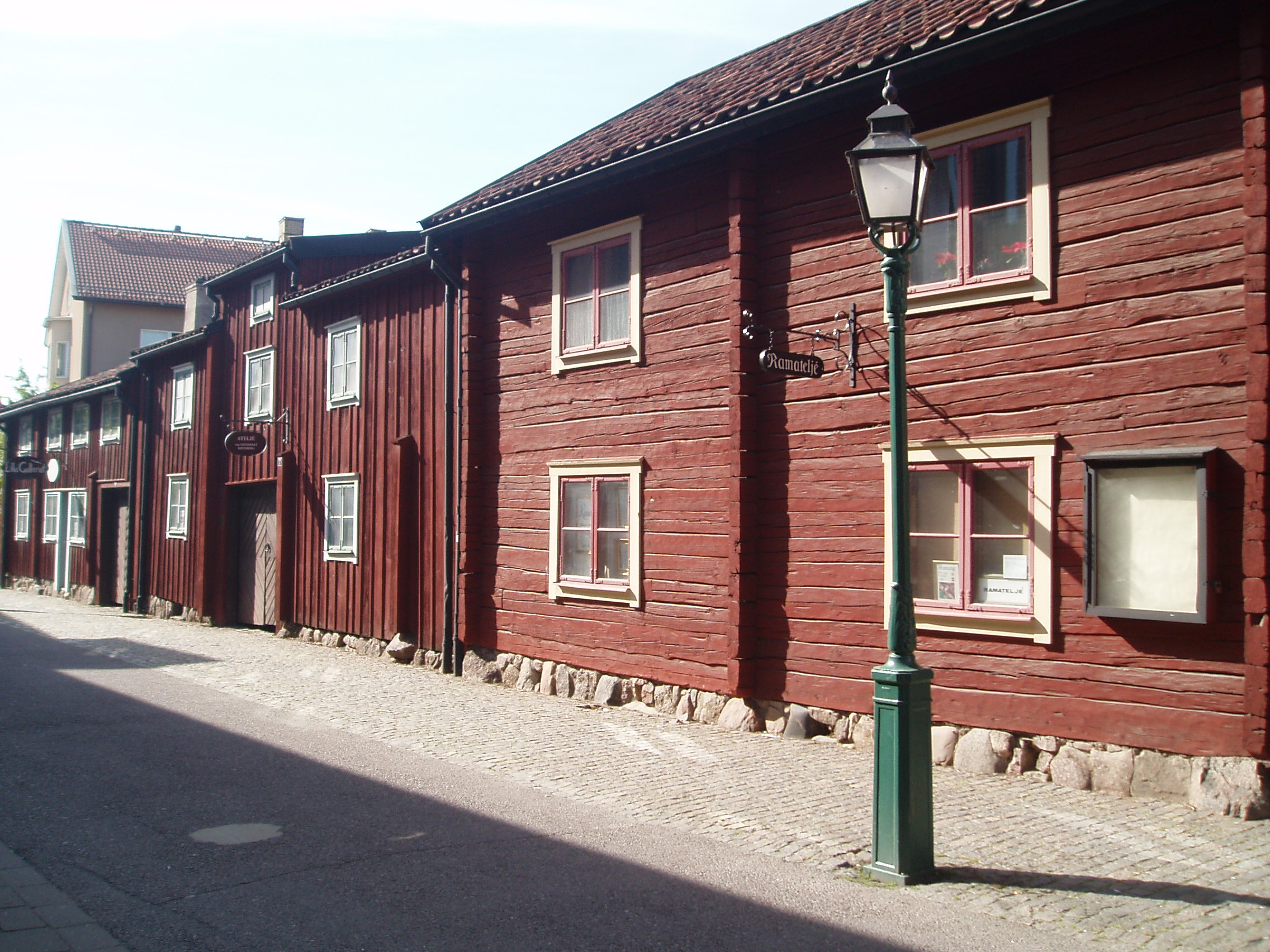
Hunnebergsgatan: an old street with preserved older buildings.

The city is possibly named after the Lionga ting assembly which according to Medieval Scandinavian laws was the most important thing in Östergötland. Exact location of the Lionga ting is not known, but it was along the Eriksgata. The term "-köping" means there was a market there.

Historically, Linköping is famed for being an early diocese, c. 1082, second in Sweden (within its pre-1658 boundaries) only to Skara. The diocese is first mentioned in 1104 in the so-called "List of Florence" (Lionga. Kaupinga). The monastery of Vreta Kloster near Roxen north of Linköping was established in 1128, and the oldest parts of the cathedral are also from the 12th century (although it has been changed many times since then, the eye-catching tower with copper roofing being a 19th-century product). On several occasions attempts to achieve a separate Swedish archdiocese were based in Linköping, although, when they finally were successful in 1164, Uppsala was chosen instead.

The coronation of Valdemar Birgersson took place in the cathedral in 1251. In the reign of Gustavus Vasa several important diets were held in the town.

Religious centers tend to become educational centers, and Linköping was no exception. A cathedral school can be traced from 1266. In 1627 the current Linköping cathedral school was established, making it the third oldest gymnasium in Sweden.

Also, Linköping was the site for the final settlement of the dispute between king Sigismund III Vasa and his uncle Duke Charles, the latter prevailing in the battle of Stångebro (the main bridge in Linköping) on 25 September 1598. This ultimately led to the rise to the throne of Charles (de facto at the 1600 Riksdag of the Estates meeting in Linköping and formally four years later) and the end of the short-lived Swedish-Polish personal union, as well as the execution of five of Charles's political opponents on the main square of Linköping on 20 March 1600.

Linköping was a small town until 1937, when the Saab aircraft industry was formed, starting a period of rapid expansion. Linköping University was established in the 1960s. Today the city is a center of high-technology and software industry.

In 2022, a rare Viking grave was found in Linköping that seemed to mark the Viking transition from paganism to Christianity.

== Climate ==
Linköping has a humid continental climate (Dfb), though with maritime influences, retaining the large differences between seasons but being comparatively mild when measured against other areas of the world on similar latitudes. Linköping tends to be slightly cooler in summer than nearby areas in the Mälar valley, but still was the weather station in Sweden among the officially listed for monthly statistics, that until 2018 had come the closest to a subtropical month, with July 1914 having a mean temperature of 21.8 °C (71.2 °F), with the subtropical border being at 22 °C (72 °F) for the warmest month. Normally summer highs average in the low 20s and winter temperatures commonly hover just above the freezing point during the day, then falls below it at night.

Climate data for Linköping-Malmslätt (2002–2022 averages; extremes since 1901)
| Month | Jan | Feb | Mar | Apr | May | Jun | Jul | Aug | Sep | Oct | Nov | Dec | Year |
|---|---|---|---|---|---|---|---|---|---|---|---|---|---|
| Record high °C (°F) | 11.7 (53.1) | 14.3 (57.7) | 18.7 (65.7) | 26.9 (80.4) | 30.5 (86.9) | 34.5 (94.1) | 36.9 (98.4) | 34.6 (94.3) | 28.2 (82.8) | 21.6 (70.9) | 15.0 (59.0) | 12.5 (54.5) | 36.9 (98.4) |
| Mean maximum °C (°F) | 7.5 (45.5) | 7.7 (45.9) | 13.6 (56.5) | 19.1 (66.4) | 24.4 (75.9) | 28.0 (82.4) | 29.1 (84.4) | 28.1 (82.6) | 22.8 (73.0) | 16.5 (61.7) | 12.0 (53.6) | 8.3 (46.9) | 30.5 (86.9) |
| Mean daily maximum °C (°F) | 0.9 (33.6) | 1.4 (34.5) | 5.6 (42.1) | 11.6 (52.9) | 16.7 (62.1) | 20.8 (69.4) | 22.9 (73.2) | 21.7 (71.1) | 17.0 (62.6) | 10.7 (51.3) | 5.7 (42.3) | 2.5 (36.5) | 11.5 (52.6) |
| Daily mean °C (°F) | −1.8 (28.8) | −1.7 (28.9) | 1.4 (34.5) | 6.1 (43.0) | 11.0 (51.8) | 15.1 (59.2) | 17.5 (63.5) | 16.5 (61.7) | 12.5 (54.5) | 7.2 (45.0) | 3.2 (37.8) | −0.2 (31.6) | 7.2 (45.0) |
| Mean daily minimum °C (°F) | −4.6 (23.7) | −4.7 (23.5) | −2.9 (26.8) | 0.5 (32.9) | 5.3 (41.5) | 9.4 (48.9) | 12.0 (53.6) | 11.3 (52.3) | 7.9 (46.2) | 3.7 (38.7) | 0.7 (33.3) | −2.8 (27.0) | 3.0 (37.4) |
| Mean minimum °C (°F) | −16.9 (1.6) | −14.8 (5.4) | −11.8 (10.8) | −5.9 (21.4) | −1.9 (28.6) | 3.7 (38.7) | 7.2 (45.0) | 5.4 (41.7) | 0.2 (32.4) | −4.4 (24.1) | −8.1 (17.4) | −13.2 (8.2) | −19.4 (−2.9) |
| Record low °C (°F) | −32.0 (−25.6) | −30.4 (−22.7) | −27.0 (−16.6) | −16.0 (3.2) | −5.2 (22.6) | −1.4 (29.5) | 3.0 (37.4) | 1.2 (34.2) | −4.3 (24.3) | −11.1 (12.0) | −18.3 (−0.9) | −27.6 (−17.7) | −32.0 (−25.6) |
| Average precipitation mm (inches) | 30.7 (1.21) | 29.8 (1.17) | 27.4 (1.08) | 31.3 (1.23) | 58.4 (2.30) | 71.6 (2.82) | 84.0 (3.31) | 92.2 (3.63) | 41.6 (1.64) | 56.4 (2.22) | 44.4 (1.75) | 37.0 (1.46) | 604.8 (23.82) |
Source 1: SMHI Open Data
Source 2: SMHI Monthly Data 2002–2022

== Demography ==
In 2000, 10.9 per cent of the population in Linköping municipality had a foreign background. Since then, the share has gradually increased and in 2019 its share amounted to 23.1 percent. Top 5 largest immigrant communities are:

1. Iraq – 3850

2. Somalia - 2345

3. Eritrea - 1129

4. Iran - 988

5. Bosnia and Herzegovina - 667

== Culture ==
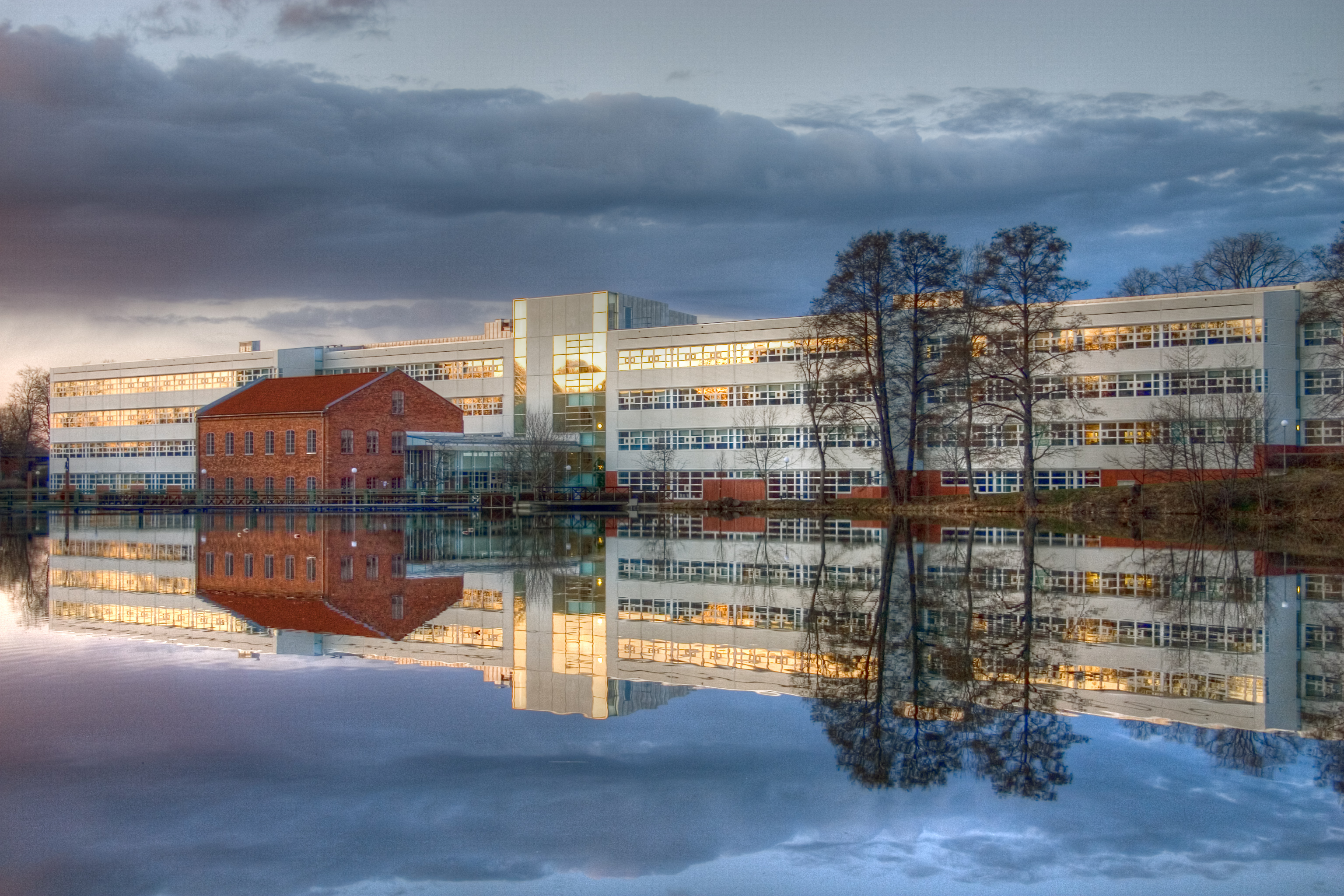
The headquarters of regional utilities company, Tekniska Verken, at Stångebro

Linköping is host to a range of cultural attractions including arts, theatre, history, concerts, markets, festivals and sporting events.

Special sights of interests are: the locks of Berg on the Göta Canal, the locks of the Kinda Canal, Gamla Linköping, Valla skogen and Valla fritidsområde (Old Linköping, Valla Wood, and the Valla recreational area), Flygvapen museum (the Air Force Museum), Linköping's domkyrka (the cathedral), Slotts- och domkyrkomuseet (the Castle and Cathedral Museum) and Östergötlands Länsmuseum (the Östergötland County Museum). Konsthallen Passagen is an art gallery located in the main square.

Tornby, to the north of the city centre, is a shopping area with retail outlets.

The city and its environs offer all sorts of green landscapes to see and experience. Two examples are a park named after the group responsible for it, Trädgårdsföreningen (The Garden Society), and the Tinnerö area with its oak woodland. Local bodies of water include the lakes Roxen, Rängen and Järnlunden, the River Stångån/Kinda Canal and the Göta Canal with the Berg locks. These areas can be accessed by foot, bicycle, or boat.

Linköping is the home of the Linköping Symphony Orchestra. The city is one of the sites of the Östergötland Music Days each summer, and the host of the Student Orchestra Festival in May every other year. One of the most notable choirs in Linköping is the Linköping University Male Voice Choir.

Linköping is also the home of theatrical heavy metal band Ghost and rock band the Pusjkins (sv).

The area around the main square was re-planned in the 1960s, and many old houses were destroyed. Some, however, were moved to Gamla Linköping (Old Linköping), in the city's western part, neighbouring the university's main campus. It is a living museum environment and a popular site with both residents and tourists.

NärCon, the largest anime and gaming convention in the Nordic countries, is held in Linköping.

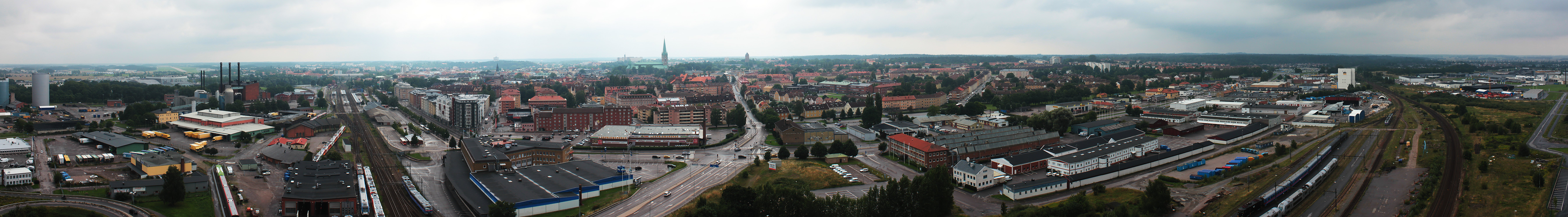
A panorama view of Linköping, with Domkyrka church as the highest building of the whole city

== Sport ==
Teams from Linköping are prominent in floorball, volleyball (Linköpings VC) and ice hockey (Linköpings HC; see above, or "Cluben" as some fans refer to it). The hockey team allied itself with Linköping's women's football team and created Linköpings FC, which plays in the highest division. The team won the Swedish Cup in 2006 and 2014. The world's largest floorball club Linköping Innebandy resides in the indoor sports arena in the city centre. The city continues to lack a first-class men's team in football with several teams competing in the lower leagues.

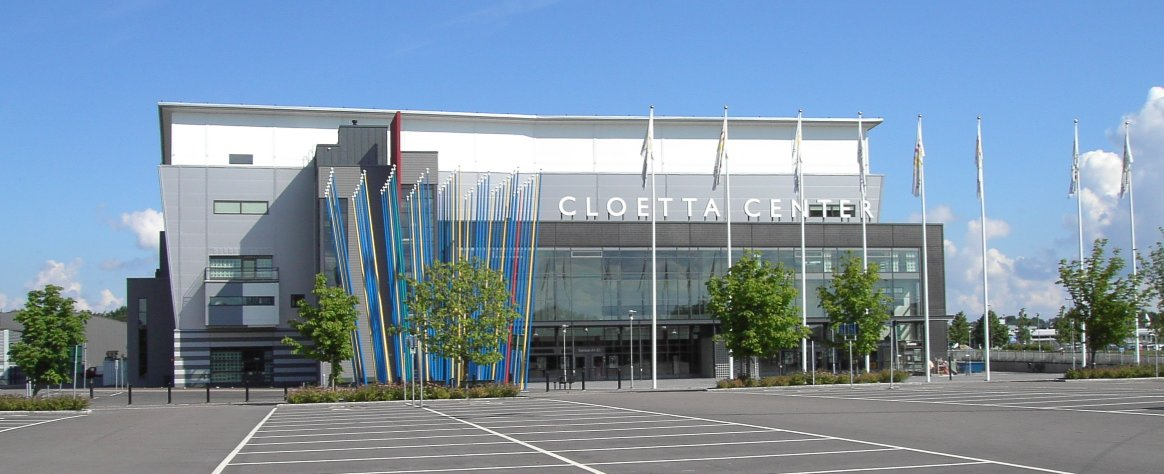
SAAB Arena (formerly Cloetta Center), LHC's home stadium

Other sports clubs include:

- BK Derby
- Derby/Linköping BK
- BK Kenty
- LiU AIF FK
- Hjulsbro IK
- IK Östria Lambohov
- Karle IF
- Linköpings ASS
- Malmslätts AIK
- Linköpings SF
- Linköpings Budoklubb
- Ekängen IF

=== Orienteering ===
Linköping hosted the 1968 World Orienteering Championships.

=== Speedway ===
The city has a close association with motorcycle speedway, hosting the team known as Filbyterna from 1948 to 2010. The first venue was at the old Linköping Motorstadion or Gamla Motorstadion in Ryd (the site where Linköpings Rugbyklubb play). When this speedway track was demolished in 1972, the team moved to the Sviestad Motorstadion in 1973 until their closure in 2010. The stadium continues to host events and held the World Championship round called the Speedway Grand Prix of Sweden from 1995 to 2000 and the 2022 Swedish Individual Speedway Championship.

== Politics and government ==
General elections were held in Sweden on 14 September 2014 to elect the Riksdag, all 21 county councils and 290 municipal assemblies.

Linköping votes as of 14 September 2014
| Party | Riksdag Percentage | Municipality Percentage |
|---|---|---|
| Left Party | 4.7% | 5.8% |
| Social Democrats | 29.1% | 33.9% |
| Green Party | 8.2% | 8.2% |
| Centre Party | 6.1% | 5.6% |
| Moderate Party | 24.2% | 23.3% |
| Christian Democrats | 5.8% | 6.4% |
| Liberal People's Party | 7.0% | 7.7% |
| Sweden Democrats | 11.2% | 7.7% |
| other minor parties | 3.8% | 1.5% |
| Total | 100% | 100% |

The local Social Democrats (S; Social Demokraterna), Green Party (MP; Miljöpartiet) and the Liberal People's Party (L; Liberalerna, formerly FP; Folk Partiet) formed a coalition majority named "coalition for Linköping" with 40 out of 79 mandates, while the minority opposition in Linköping consist each separate by: the Moderate Party (M; Moderaterna), Centre Party (C; Center Partiet), Christian Democrats (Kristdemokraterna), Left Party (V; Vänsterpartiet) and the Sweden Democrats (SD; Sverige Demokraterna).

The Swedish Air Force Museum is located near the town.

== Economy ==
One of the biggest employers in Linköping is Saab which among other products manufactures the SAAB Gripen fighter jet and where the SAAB 340 twin-engine commuter turboprop was produced at Linköping/Saab Airport, which is why it is called "The flight city". The city also has a strong presence in information technology with the headquarters of IFS AB, Sectra AB and Cambio Healthcare Systems AB, as well as the presence of Motorola, Ericsson, Infor, and many others. Toyota Industries Sweden AB has a presence in Linköping, as one of its subsidiaries, BT Industries, is located in nearby Mjölby.

== Transport ==
The city is situated south of lake Roxen (which is part of the historically important water paths Motala ström and the Göta Canal) where the E4, Sweden's highway backbone, crosses the river Stångån (and Kinda kanal). It is situated on the main southern railway line connecting Stockholm with Malmö and Danish capital Copenhagen. Linköping/Saab Airport offers daily connections to Amsterdam.

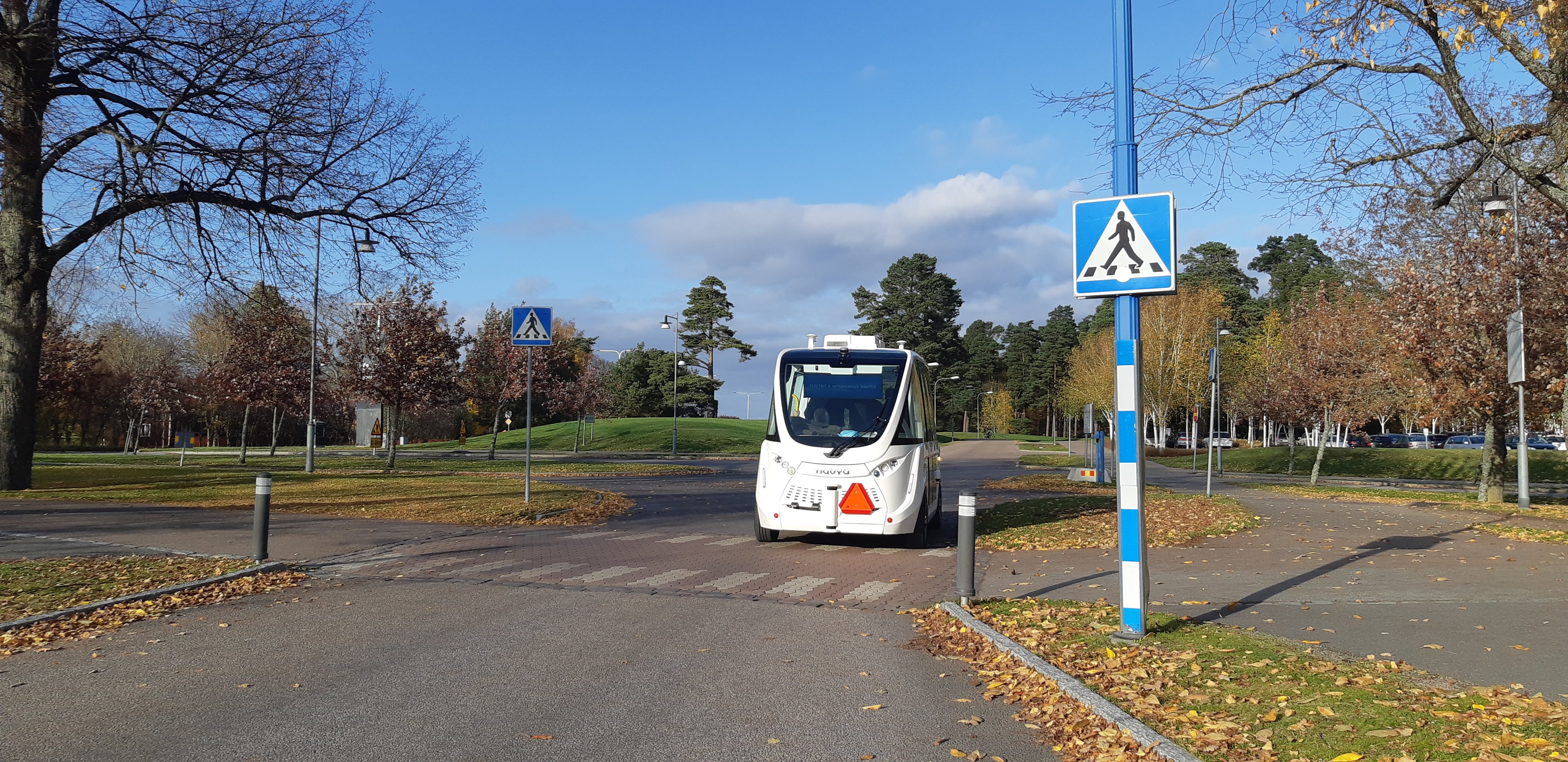
An autonomous bus experiment around Linköping University

In 2019, the city started experimenting with two autonomous buses that run along a 2 km route around the university campus.

== Education ==
The city is home to Linköping University and its associated hospital Linköping University Hospital. The Katedralskolan (English: Cathedral School) is the fifth oldest gymnasium in the country.

== Notable residents ==
- Jessica Adolfsson
- Magnus Andersson
- Jenni Asserholt
- Martin Axenrot
- Charlotta Berger
- Jöns Jacob Berzelius
- Hans Brask
- Elsa Brändström
- Fredrik Bringnäs
- Magnus Bäckstedt
- Oscar Cesare
- Tage Danielsson
- Dead Soul (band)
- Tobias Forge
- Gustav Forsling
- Cecilia Frode
- Thomas Funck
- Ghost (band)
- Glam Sam And His Combo (Mats Samuelsson)
- Ludwig Göransson
- Marie Göranzon
- Rutger Gunnarsson
- Simon Hellholm
- Gunnar Hoffsten
- Louise Hoffsten
- Patrik Jensen
- Magnus Johansson
- Sofie Louise Johansson
- Kettil Karlsson (Vasa)
- Jonna Lee (of iamamiwhoami)
- Paul Lindvall
- Anders Ljungstedt
- Martin Lönnebo
- Olaus Magnus
- Mercedes Masöhn
- Bruno K. Öijer
- Erik Sagström
- Henriette Sjöberg
- Margareta Suber
- Pierre Thorsson
- Carl-Johan Vallgren
- André Oscar Wallenberg
- Lars Winnerbäck

== City districts ==
Source in Swedish:

- Innerstaden
- Ramshäll
- Vimanshäll
- Djurgården
- Ekholmen
- Ekkällan
- Johannelund
- Berga
- Garnisonen
- Gottfridsberg
- Hackefors
- Hejdegården
- Hjulsbro
- Jägarvallen
- Kallerstad
- Lambohov
- Mjärdevi
- Ryd
- Skäggetorp
- Tallboda
- Tannefors
- Tornby
- Ullstämma
- Västra Valla
- Östra Valla
- Vasastaden
- Vidingsjö

=== Jägarvallen ===
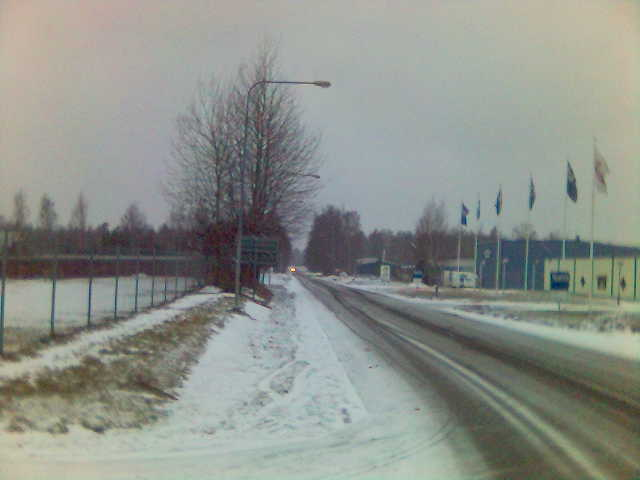
Jägarvallen

Jägarvallen is a city district in Linköping with a little over 140 households and almost 400 residents. It is located (58.3972°N 15.5411°E) on the outskirts of the city, between Ryd and Malmen airfield, and is crossed by an old stretch of the road to Mjölby. The eastern part of Jägarvallen is dominated by an industrial area, while the western end, closest Malmen airfield, has apartment buildings.

== See also ==
- Diocese of Linköping
- Roundabout dog
- Linköping University
- Linköping Bloodbath
- 2019 Linköping explosion
