= Ramshäll =

City district in Linköping, Sweden

Coordinates: 58°23.913′N 15°37.986′E

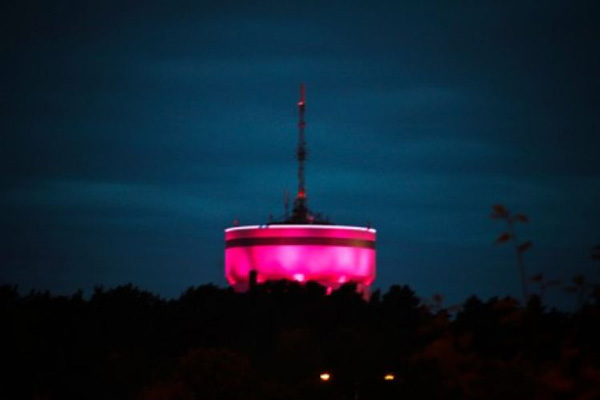
Linköping Water Tower

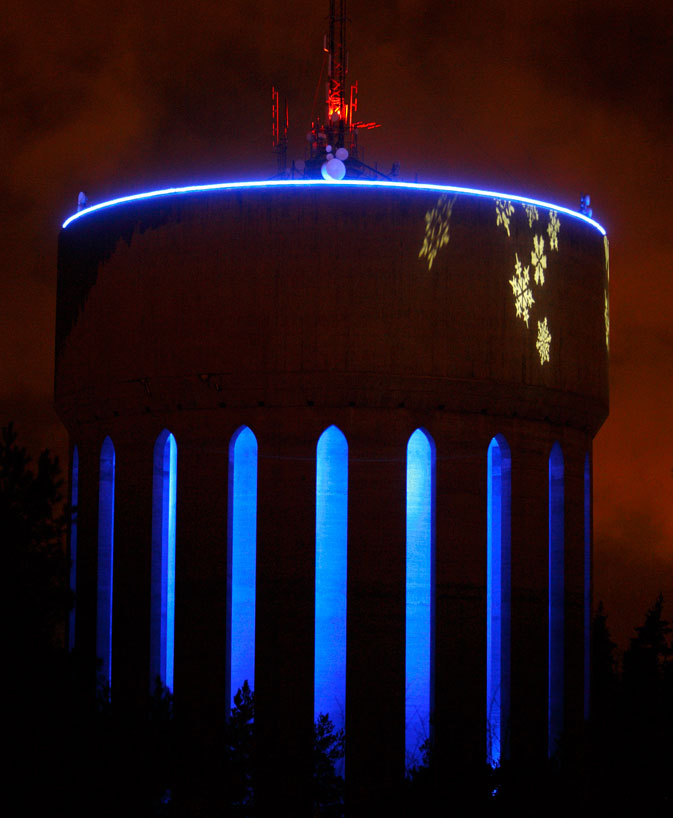
Linköping Water Tower

Ramshäll is a city district in Linköping, Sweden. The buildings consist mostly of apartment buildings with a very high proportion of small dwellings. Villa area in the northeastern part of Ramshäll, with houses from the turn of the century onwards, is ranked as Östergötland's most expensive residential area.

The area includes Berga pasture, a large wooded recreation area, including Linköping's water tower. Despite the name Berga pasture is not located in the district of Berga, Linköping. The area has pre-schools, but no primary school. There is also service to the elderly.

Districts adjoining Ramshäll are Vimanshäll, Hejdegården, Ekkällan, Downtown, East Valla and Berga.
