= Simon Hellholm =

Swedish ice hockey player

- Born: 24 February 1997 (age 29) Linköping, Sweden
- Height: 6 ft 2 in (188 cm)
- Weight: 196 lb (89 kg; 14 st 0 lb)
- Position: Forward
- Shoots: Left
- Hockeyettan team: Nybro Vikings IF
- Playing career: 2015–present

Simon Hellholm (born 24 February 1997) is a Swedish ice hockey player. He is currently playing with Nybro Vikings IF.

== Career ==
Born in Linköping, Sweden, Hellholm played junior hockey, with local team Linköpings HC. In 2011–12, he debuted at the under-16 level as a 15-year-old, playing fifteenth games in the J16 Elit. The following season he dressed for fourteen U-18 games, recording four goals and three assists. He also competed with a regional all-star team from Östergötland in the annual TV-pucken, an under-15 national tournament, and notched seven goals and four assists over eight games. In 2013–14, Hellholm played eight games with Linköpings HC's J20 SuperElit team. After two impressive seasons in the J20 SuperElit; appearing in 87 regular season games, and recording 48 points. Hellholm logged his first minutes in Sweden's top-flight SHL.

== Career statistics ==
=== Regular season and playoffs ===
			Regular season					Playoffs
Season	Team	League	GP	G	A	Pts	PIM	GP	G	A	Pts	PIM
2012–13	Linköpings HC	J20	1	0	0	0	0	—	—	—	—	—
2013–14	Linköpings HC	J20	8	0	0	0	0	2	0	0	0	0
2014–15	Linköpings HC	J20	44	4	13	17	14	7	1	0	1	4
2015–16	Linköpings HC	J20	43	23	8	31	36	4	0	1	1	2
2015–16	Linköpings HC	SHL	1	0	0	0	0	—	—	—	—	—
