= Henriette Sjöberg =

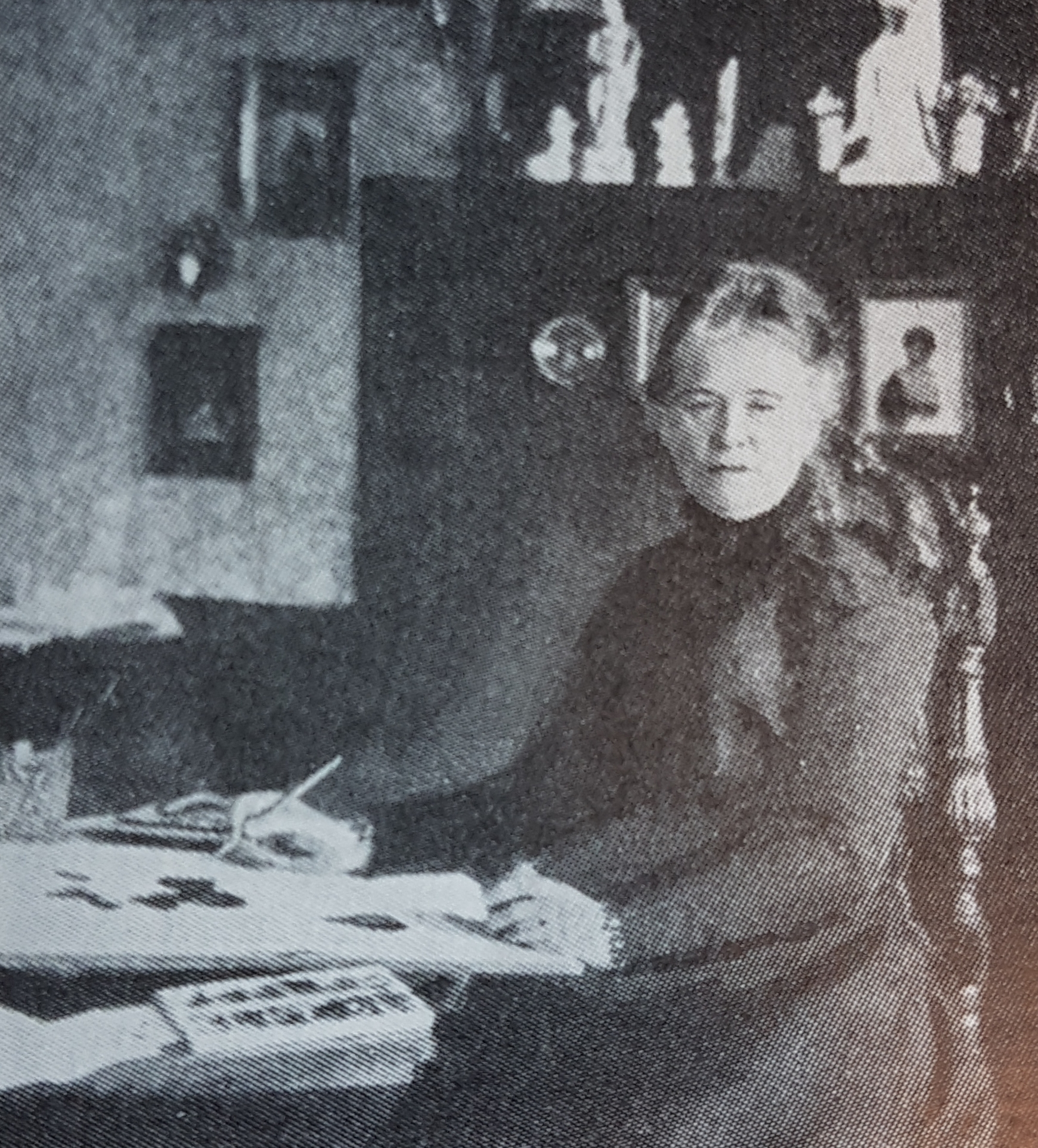
Henriette Sjöberg

Henrietta (Henriette) Wilhelmina Sofia Sjöberg (6 April 1842 — 6 February 1915) was a Swedish painter, illustrator and art teacher. She is remembered for contributing some 200 meticulously crafted watercolours of Swedish cultivated plants to the Sveriges Kulturväxter project. After the project was abandoned in 1896, she produced botanical wall plates for schools and contributed illustrations to the Swedish Horticultural Association's two-volume work on Swedish fruits. From 1901, Sjöberg spent the rest of her life as a drawing and painting instructor at the Royal Swedish Academy of Agriculture and Forestry. Many of her works can be seen in Sweden's Nordic Museum.

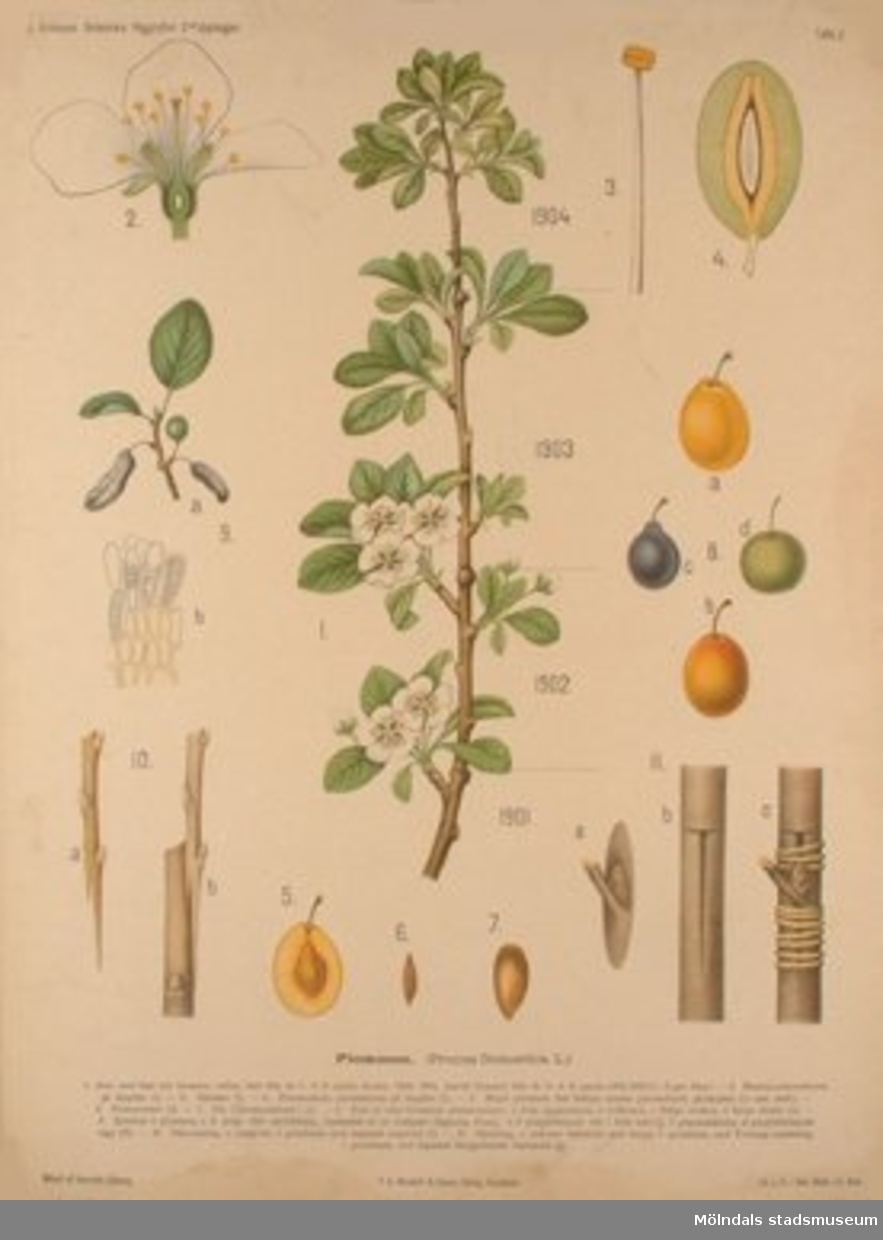
Plum wall plate for schools by Henriette Sjöberg (c. 1896)

== Early life and education ==
Born on 6 April 1842 in Linköping, Henrietta Wilhelmina Sofia Sjöberg was the daughter of Anders Gustaf Sjöberg and his wife Helena Sofia née Andersdotter. After growing up in Stockholm, when she was 17 she attended the handicrafts school Slöjdskolan which had just begun to admit women. She was instructed in watercolour painting by Johan Zacharias Blackstadius and in flower painting by Anna Tigerhielm, the wife of the botanist Nils Johan Andersson. She spent about ten years at the school, earning medals for both drawing and engraving.

== Career ==
While she was still studying and until 1875, Sjöberg worked as an engraver at the lithography company run by Karl Ström and Carl Gustaf Höglind. It was there she met N.J. Andersson who initially employed her to illustrate diseased plants for the Agricultural Academy which were later published in journals, including that of Svenska trädgårdsförening. the Swedish horticultural society.

From 1880, she produced coloured illustrations for the Svenska kulturväxter project which set out to cover all of Sweden's cultivated plants. The project was terminated in 1896 when it was realized it would be impossible to document the considerable increase in new breeds. Neverless, Sjöberg had produced plates of some 200 cereals, fruits and vegetables, including potatoes, carrots, plums and strawberries. Meticulously produced, they can be seen today in the collection of the Nordic Museum. From 1896, Sjöberg produced botanical wall plates for schools and contributed illustrations to the Swedish Horticultural Association's two-volume work on Swedish fruits titled Svenska fruktsorter i färgglada afbildningar (published successively in 1899 and 1912). From 1901, she spent the rest of her life as a drawing and painting instructor at the Royal Swedish Academy of Agriculture and Forestry. Thanks to their outstanding quality, her illustrations were admired both at home and abroad.

Henriette Sjöberg died in Stockholm on 6 February 1915 and was buried in Norra begravningsplatsen, the city's North Cemetery.
