= Ryd, Linköping =

City district in Linköping, Sweden

Coordinates: 58°24′32″N 15°33′45″E

A typical alleyway photo of Ryd, Linköping. Taken outside of Rydsvägen 250 towards 258.

Ryd is a city district in Linköping, Sweden, best known for housing the bulk of the Linköping University (Linköpings Universitet, LiU) student body. They live in houses specifically assigned to LiU's students. Many of these homes are in the form of corridor rooms, where students have their own bedroom with an en-suite bathroom but a shared kitchen. The architecture of Ryd is typical of the Million Programme housing project of 1965–1974, one exception being the manor-like Ryds Herrgård (a.k.a. Herrgår'n or simply HG) which serves as a student pub/club.

It also had offices of Studentbostäder & Stångåstaden, where studentbostäder mainly helps the students for giving accommodation and Vårdcentralen (Medical Clinic). Ryd also has Rydcentrum, a retail space that includes Hemköp, where people can buy their household (food items), a pharmacy, a bicycle and key shop, a florist, a bakery, a small pizzeria outlet and a Chinese - Thai restaurant. Ryd also has a bus connection, where people can go to the Resecentrum (travel centre). Residents of Ryd are often heard speaking of Student Ryd (Swedish Studentryd) and the predominantly non-student Human Ryd (Människoryd) as two separate areas of the district. In 2012, 33% of the inhabitants of Ryd were born outside of Sweden.

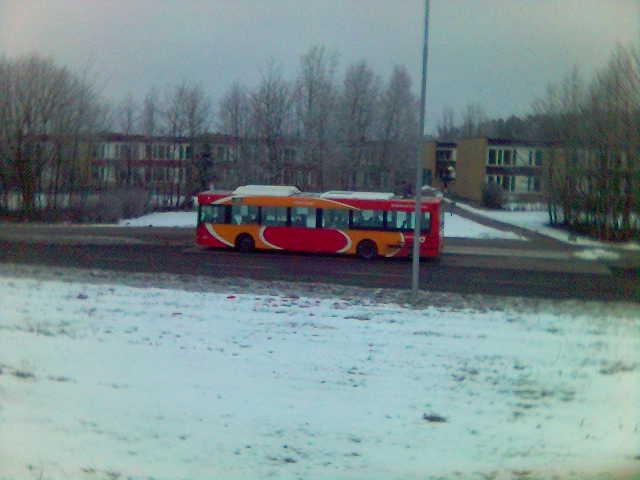
Bus
