= Tannefors =

- City district
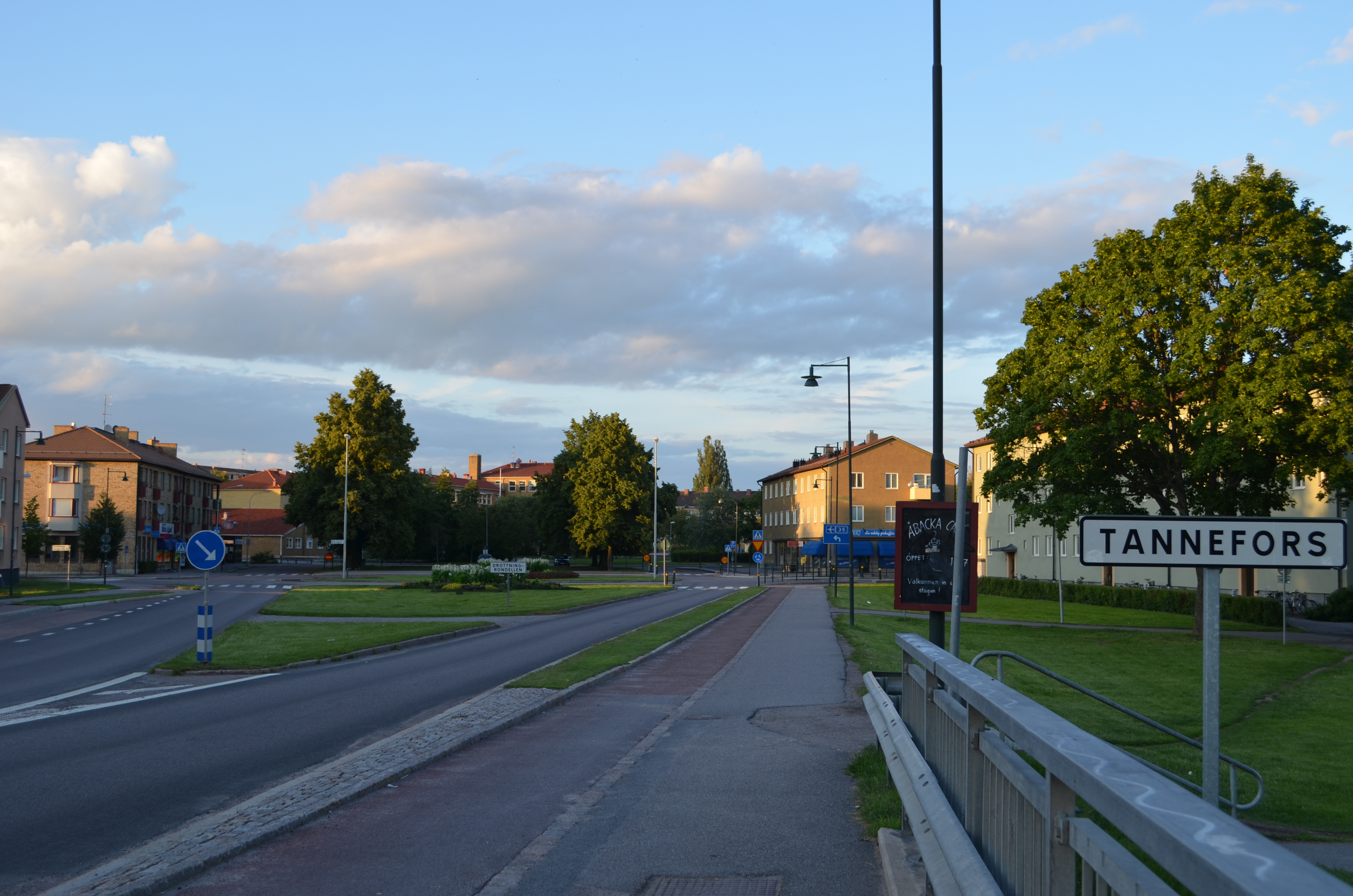
- Tannefors in July 2011
- Interactive map of Tannefors
- Coordinates: 58°24′27″N 15°38′24″E
- Country: Sweden
- Province: Östergötland
- County: Östergötland County
- Municipality: Linköping Municipality

Population (2021)
  - Total: 4,786
- Time zone: UTC+1 (CET)
  - Summer (DST): UTC+2 (CEST)

Tannefors (Swedish pronunciation: [ˈtânːɛˌfɔʂ]) is a city district in Linköping, Sweden, the district had a population of 4,786 in 2021. It lies just east of the city center, opposite Stångån. The district's eastern parts are dominated by Saab AB, surrounding industries and Linköping Airport. In Tannefors there is a stop for trains on the Tjust and Stångådal lines. There is a local football team called Tannefors IF. The schools Kungsbergsskolan and Tanneforsskolan are located here.

The districts adjoining Tannefors are Johannelund, Hejdegården, Downtown and Kallerstad.
