= Allsvenskan (disambiguation) =

Allsvenskan is the highest league of Swedish football for men. Allsvenskan (the all Swedish) is also the name of several Swedish sport leagues:

- Damallsvenskan, highest women's football league
- Allsvenskan (bandy), second highest bandy league since the 2007–08 season
- Allsvenskan and Elitserien (bandy), combined highest bandy leagues until the 2007–08 season
- Allsvenskan (men's handball), second highest men's handball league
- Allsvenskan (women's handball), second highest women's handball league
- Allsvenskan (rugby), highest rugby league
- HockeyAllsvenskan, second highest ice hockey league
- Allsvenskan (speedway), the second highest speedway league
- Superallsvenskan, defunct ice hockey league
- Allsvenskan play-offs, a Swedish football cup held to decide the Swedish football champions between 1982 and 1990
