= Törnby =

Coordinates: 59°19′32″N 17°43′39″E

- Smaller locality
- Interactive map of Törnby
- Country: Sweden
- County: Stockholm County
- Municipality: Ekerö Municipality
- Time zone: UTC+1 (CET)
  - Summer (DST): UTC+2 (CEST)

Törnby is a village in Ekerö Municipality, Stockholm County, Sweden.
