= Tallboda =

City district in Linköping, Sweden

Coordinates: 58°25′48″N 15°41′14″E

Tallboda is a city district of Linköping, which has grown together with the city as it has expanded. The district had 3 151 inhabitants at the end of 2010.

The area was originally built with small houses starting in the mid-1950s, on the border between the city of Linköping and Åkerbo rural district, when Åkerbo had a lower council tax. 1971, Åkerbo was merged into Linköping Municipality. Major expansions to the northeast has been made with one-and two-story townhouses in stages starting in 1980, which still was ongoing in 2006. The separation between Tallboda and the eastern neighboring village Malmskogen is becoming narrower as this expansion continues. With the exception of some rental properties, expansion is made by condominiums and individually owned properties.

Tallboda's southwestern part is a small center, built around 1990 with the supermarket Tempo Tallen, postal service, retirement home, gaming kiosk and pizzeria Euro Pizza (previously in the same premises there has been fast food stores and gaming cafe). Tallboda Pizzeria was 100 meters to the east before it closed and was originally a food stand built just next door to the post office. In the newer eastern part there is a convenience store, commonly known as "farsans" and the area's oldest western part there is a maritime shop, Runi Marin.
