= Elitserien (water polo) =

Swedish water polo league

Elitserien is the senior of the two water polo leagues in Sweden, the other one being Allsvenskan. Elitserien consists of a regular season of six matches after which a round of final four playoffs us held between the four best teams. A semi-finals is then held between the first and the fourth team and the second and third of the final four round. The final match will then be played between the winner and second team of the semi-finals. The two last teams in the regular season will meet the first and second teams respectively from Allsvenskan in qualifying matches for next year's Elitserien.

== List of champions ==
The following list presents the annual winners of men's Elitserien since the establishment of the Swedish Swimming Federation.

- 1906 – Stockholms KK
- 1907 – Stockholms KK
- 1908 – Stockholms KK
- 1909 – Stockholms KK
- 1910 – Stockholms KK
- 1911 – Stockholms KK
- 1912 – Stockholms KK
- 1913 – Stockholms KK
- 1914 – Stockholms KK
- 1915 – Stockholms KK
- 1916 – Stockholms KK
- 1917 – Stockholms KK
- 1918 – Stockholms KK
- 1919 – Stockholms KK
- 1920 – Stockholms KK
- 1921 – Stockholms KK
- 1922 – Stockholms KK
- 1923 – Stockholms KK
- 1924 – Stockholms KK
- 1925 – SK Neptun
- 1926 – SK Neptun
- 1927 – Stockholms KK
- 1928 – SK Neptun
- 1929 – Stockholms KK
- 1930 – Stockholms KK
- 1931 – Stockholms KK
- 1932 – SK Neptun
- 1933 – Stockholms KK
- 1934 – SoIK Hellas
- 1935 – SK Neptun
- 1936 – Stockholms KK
- 1937 – Stockholms KK
- 1938 – Stockholms KK
- 1939 – Stockholms KK
- 1940 – Stockholms KK
- 1941 – SK Neptun
- 1942 – SoIK Hellas
- 1943 – SoIK Hellas
- 1944 – Stockholms KK
- 1945 – Stockholms KK
- 1946 – SoIK Hellas
- 1947 – SoIK Hellas
- 1948 – SoIK Hellas
- 1949 – SoIK Hellas
- 1950 – SoIK Hellas
- 1951 – SoIK Hellas
- 1952 – SoIK Hellas
- 1953 – SoIK Hellas
- 1954 – SoIK Hellas
- 1955 – SoIK Hellas
- 1956 – SoIK Hellas
- 1957 – SoIK Hellas
- 1958 – SoIK Hellas
- 1959 – SoIK Hellas
- 1960 – SoIK Hellas
- 1961 – Stockholms KK
- 1962 – Stockholms KK
- 1963 – Tunafors SK
- 1964 – Tunafors SK
- 1965 – Tunafors SK
- 1966 – Tunafors SK
- 1967 – Tunafors SK
- 1968 – Stockholms KK
- 1969 – Stockholms KK
- 1970 – Stockholms KK
- 1971 – Stockholms KK
- 1972 – Stockholms KK
- 1973 – Stockholms KK
- 1974 – Stockholms KK
- 1975 – Stockholms KK
- 1976 – Västerås SS
- 1977 – Västerås SS
- 1978 – Stockholms KK
- 1979 – Stockholms KK
- 1980 – Stockholms KK
- 1981 – GKKN
- 1982 – Stockholms KK
- 1983 – SK Neptun
- 1984 – SK Neptun
- 1985 – Stockholms KK
- 1986 – Stockholms KK
- 1987 – SK Neptun
- 1988 – Stockholms KK
- 1989 – StockholmsPolisens IF VattenpoloFörening
- 1990 – Stockholms KK
- 1991 – Stockholms KK
- 1992 – Stockholms KK
- 1993 – Stockholms KK
- 1994 – Stockholms KK
- 1995 – Stockholms KK
- 1996 – StockholmsPolisens IF VattenpoloFörening
- 1997 – StockholmsPolisens IF VattenpoloFörening
- 1998 – Stockholms KK
- 1999 – Stockholms KK
- 2000 – Stockholms KK
- 2001 – Stockholms KK
- 2002 – Stockholms KK
- 2003 – Stockholms KK
- 2004 – Stockholms KK
- 2005 – Stockholms KK
- 2006 – SoIK Hellas
- 2007 – SoIK Hellas
- 2008 – SK Ran
- 2009 – SoIK Hellas
- 2010 – Järfälla Simsällskap
- 2011 – Järfälla Simsällskap
- 2012 – Järfälla Simsällskap
- 2013 – Järfälla Simsällskap
- 2014 – SoIK Hellas
- 2015 – Järfälla Simsällskap
- 2016 – Linköpings Simidrottsförening
- 2017 – Järfälla Simsällskap
- 2018 – Järfälla Simsällskap
- 2019 – Järfälla Simsällskap
- 2020 – Stockholmspolisens IF
- 2021 – Järfälla Simsällskap
- 2022 – Järfälla Simsällskap
- 2023 – Stockholmspolisens IF
- 2024 – Järfälla Simsällskap
- 2025 – Järfälla Simsällskap
- 2026 – Stockholmspolisens IF
