= Gottfridsberg =

City district in Linköping, Sweden

Coordinates: 58°24.762′N 15°35.830′E

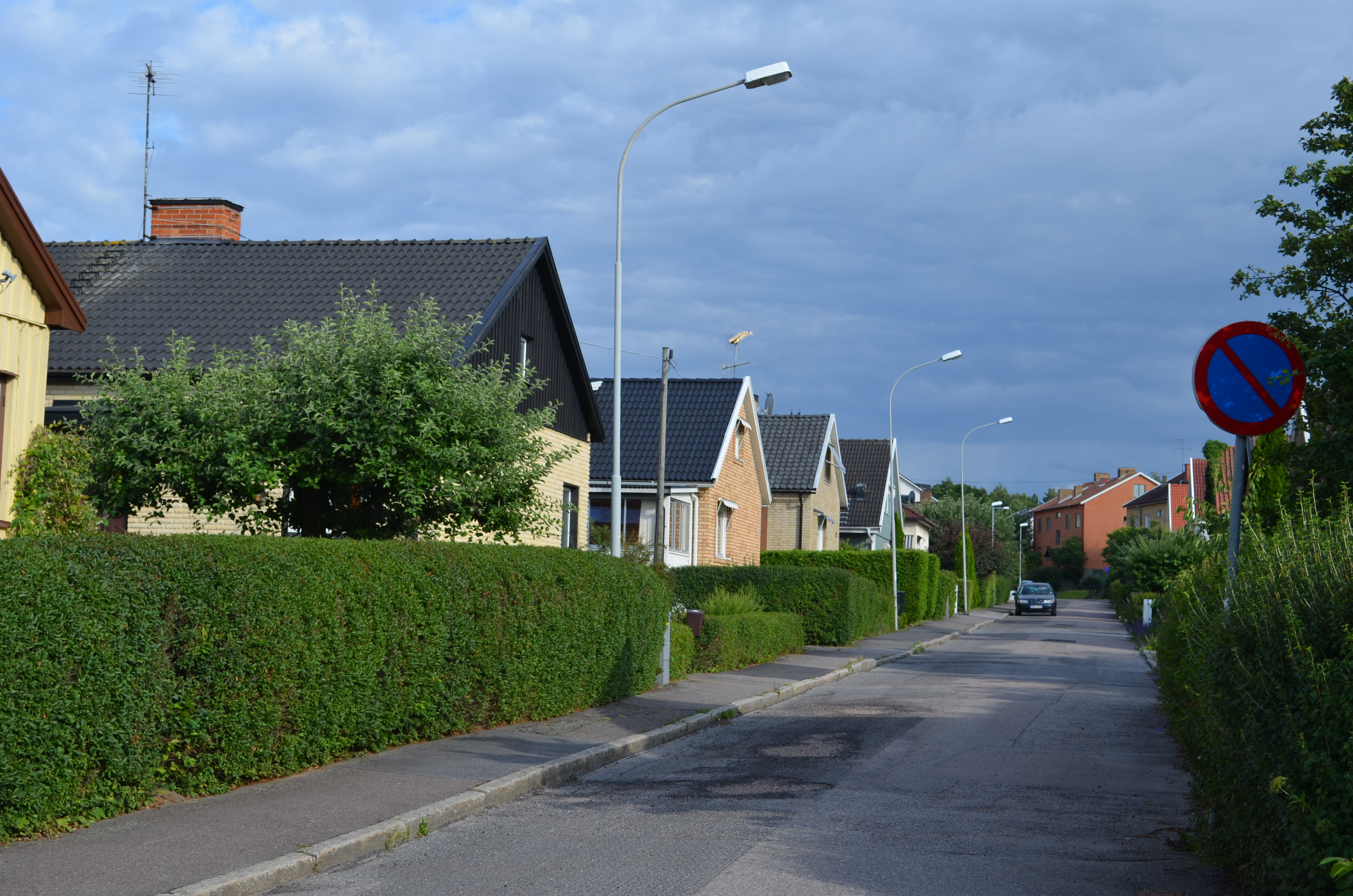
Örngatan in Gottfridsberg

Gottfridsberg in Linköping is a city district, west of the Inner City. It consists of the areas Barhäll, Fridhem, old Gottfridsberg, Tornhagen and Åbylund. The area is bounded on the south by Malmslättsvägen, to the east by Västra vägen and Bergsvägen, in the north by the railroad and to the west by Rydsskogen.

Gottfridsberg emerged as a suburb of Linköping in the late 19th and early 20th centuries. The district was named after a builder named Gottfrid Larsson. He moved into the area around 1877 when it was still just a nameless block and built several houses in the area that is now old Gottfridsberg.

The district has among other things, grocery store, a restaurant, pizzerias, snack bar and bakery. There are also social care homes, nursing homes and care homes for people with dementia, and schools including kindergarten, primary and secondary education. The area is People's Park (folkpark) and the Cupolen, with events such as dances, fairs, and exhibitions.

The buildings are dominated by apartment buildings with 4 788 apartments, including student residences Flamman and Fjärilen. Small houses are primarily in the areas Barhäll, Fridhem and Tornhagen.

In December 2008 there were 7 717 inhabitants in Gottfridsberg, compared with a 1960 population of 11 215 people. During 2010 some expansion of the area, where 63 condominiums built in the neighborhood Omtanken. Plans are underway for the construction of 250-300 dwellings at People's Park.
