= Innerstaden, Linköping =

City district in Linköping, Sweden

Coordinates: 58°24′40″N 15°37′20″E

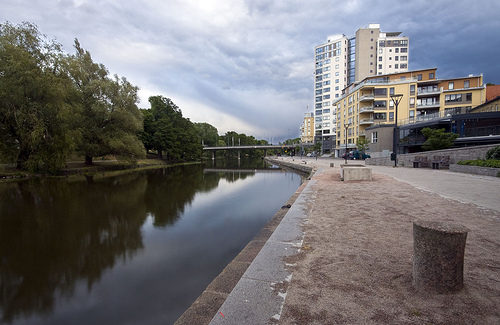
Innerstaden Linköping

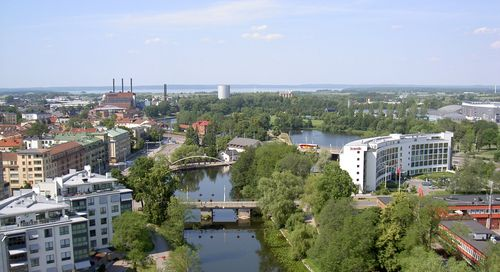
Innerstaden Linköping

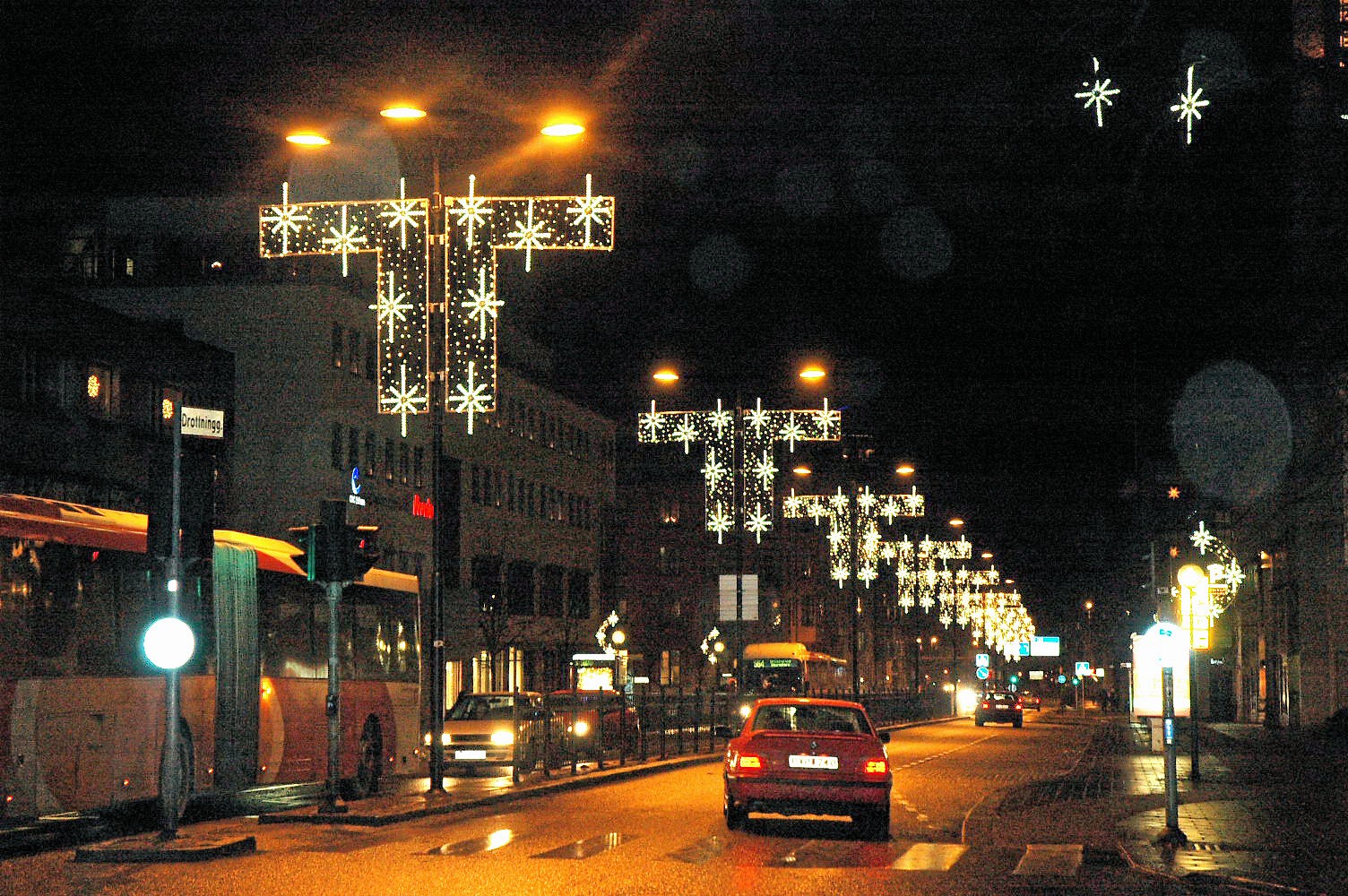
Innerstaden Linköping at night (December 2010)

Innerstaden, (English: Inner city) is a city district that includes the center of the city of Linköping. Located here is the commercial and cultural center of the city, with shops, restaurants, bars, shopping mall, museums, churches, libraries, sports facilities, and parks. Also located here is Tinnerbäcksbadet, a heated artificial lake in the middle of the city. Innerstaden also has a primary school, kindergartens, care centers for the elderly, health centers and specialized healthcare.

Housing consists almost entirely of apartment buildings which around half were built before 1960. On 31 December 2009, 10,654 people lived in the district. The majority of jobs in the area are in commerce, finance and public service.

Several construction projects underway in the inner city, including the construction of housing areas on the existing parking lot at Tinnerbäcksbadet. Districts adjoining Innerstaden are Vasastaden, Hejdegården, Ramshäll, Tannefors, East Valla and Gottfridsberg.
