= Allsvenskan (rugby union) =

Swedish rugby union league

- Current season, competition or edition: 2026
- Association: Svenska Rugbyförbundet
- Sport: Rugby union
- Founded: Men: 1943; Women: 1983
- Subdivision: North / South
- Divisions: 2
- No. of teams: Men: 16; Women: 8
- Country: Sweden
- Most recent champions: Men: Stockholm Exiles (21); Women: Enköpings RK (7)
- Tournament format: Round robin league with position Finals
- Website: http://www.rugby.se

The Allsvenskan is the current highest tier of domestic rugby union club competition in Sweden. As of 2026 the men's and women's competitions are run as round robin leagues over two regional divisions. Cross-division placement finals take place at season's end to determine final ranking, which includes the SM-Guld (Svensk Mästare Gold Medal) Grand Final to crown the champion.

In previous years a higher national men's SuperAllsvenskan competition took place, however after organisational and logisitical difficulties adversely affected the 2025 edition, this is not currently scheduled to run in 2026.

The first men's Swedish championship took place in 1943 and was won by the rugby division of IK Göta from Stockholm. The 2026 season featured twelve teams in two regional divisions, plus a further five teams in Division 1 North and three in Division 1 South

The first women's Swedish championship took place in 1983 and was won by Trollhättan Rugby Club. The 2026 season featured eight teams in two regional divisions.

Since its foundation 12 teams have been crowned men's Swedish Rugby Champions and 10 teams have been crowned women's Champions. The most successful Swedish club is Stockholm Exiles RFC who have won the men's championship title 21 times and the women's title 13 times. Nearby Enköpings RK have won the men's title 20 times and the women's title 7 times, while Pingvin RC, based in Trelleborg, have won the men's title 12 times and the women's title twice. Göteborg RF have also won the women's title 7 times.

Due to Sweden's Nordic climate, rugby seasons run in the summer, with games usually taking place on Saturdays between May and October, with a break around Midsommar.

Several players from the Allsvenskan have won caps at international level for Sweden.

== Teams ==
2026 Allsvenskan Teams
2026 Allsvenskan Teams - Stockholm

Division	Club	City/Area	Home Field	
Allsvenskan; North	Enköpings RK	Enköping, Uppsala County	Korsängens Idrottsplats	60.0730°N 18.0778°E
Allsvenskan; North	Erikslunds KF	Täby Municipality, Stockholm	Täby Rugby Center	59.4412°N 18.0411°E
Allsvenskan; North	Hammarby IF Rugby	Enskede-Årsta-Vantör, Stockholm	Gubbängsfältet	59.2606°N 18.0870°E
Allsvenskan; North	IKSU	Umeå, Västerbotten County	Nydalafältet	63.8186°N 20.3191°E
Allsvenskan; North	Stockholm Exiles RFC	Enskede-Årsta-Vantör, Stockholm	Gubbängsfältet	59.2606°N 18.0870°E
Allsvenskan; North	Uppsala RFC	Uppsala	Fyrisfjädern	59.8721°N 17.6153°E
Allsvenskan; South	Göteborg RF	Frölunda, Gothenburg	Välen	57.6415°N 11.9205°E
Allsvenskan; South	Lugi Rugbyklubb	Lund, Skåne	Centrala Idrottsplats	55.7044°N 13.1804°E
Allsvenskan; South	Malmö RC	Malmö, Skåne	Lindängens Idrottsplats	55.5961°N 12.9506°E
Allsvenskan; South	Pingvin RC	Trelleborg, Skåne	Trelleborg Rugby Arena	55.3759°N 13.1903°E
Allsvenskan; South	Spartacus Rugby Club	Partille, Gothenburg	Lexby IP	57.7462°N 12.1254°E
Allsvenskan; South	Vänersborgs RK	Vänersborg, Västra Götaland County	Vänersborg Arena	58.3654°N 12.3322°E
Division 1 North	IF Attila	Bromma, Stockholm	Bromma Sportfält Rugby	59.3495°N 17.9436°E
Division 1 North	Hammarby IF Rugby B	Enskede-Årsta-Vantör, Stockholm	Gubbängsfältet	59.2606°N 18.0870°E
Division 1 North	Stockholm Berserkers RFC	Stockholm	Gubbängsfältet	59.2606°N 18.0870°E
Division 1 North	Stockholm Exiles RFC B	Enskede-Årsta-Vantör, Stockholm	Gubbängsfältet	59.2606°N 18.0870°E
Division 1 North	Uppsala Nomads RFC	Uppsala	Fyrisfjädern	59.8721°N 17.6153°E
Division 1 South	Kalmar Södra IF	Kalmar, Småland	Södra Utmarken Idrottsplats	56.6621°N 16.3155°E
Division 1 South	Göteborg Simbas	Frölunda, Gothenburg	Välen	57.6415°N 11.9205°E
Division 1 South	Häljarp / Helsingborg	Landskrona, Skåne	Häljarps Idrottshall	55.8506°N 12.9246°E

=== Former Teams ===
Club	City/Area	Last participated	Home Field
NRK Trojan	Norrköping, Östergötland	2023	Himmelstalund Sportfält
Sandviken RC	Sandviken, Gävleborg County	2020	Jernvallen
Karlstads Rugbyklubb	Karlstad, Värmland County	2020	Orrholmens Idrottsplats
Södertälje Rugbyklubb	Södertälje, Stockholm	2020	Brunnsängs Idrottsplat
Katrineholm Griffins	Katrineholm , Södermanland County	2019	Djulö Idrottsplat
Oslo Fusion	Oslo, Norway	2017	
VRK Tigrarna	Västerås, Västmanland	2017	
DTU Exiles	Lyngby, Copenhagen	2017	Henrik Dams Alle
CBS Rugby	Frederiksberg, Copenhagen	2017	

== Champions ==
=== Men ===
Team	Titles	Most recent win	Years won
Stockholm Exiles RFC	21	2025	1966†, 1972, 1989, 2002, 2004, 2005, 2008, 2010, 2012, 2013, 2014, 2015, 2016, 2017, 2018, 2019, 2020, 2021, 2023, 2024, 2025
Enköpings RK	21	2026	1973, 1974, 1975, 1976, 1978, 1979, 1980, 1981, 1982, 1983, 1984, 1985, 1986, 1987, 1988, 1990, 2006, 2007, 2009, 2011, 2026
Pingvin RC	12	2022	1991, 1992, 1993, 1994, 1995, 1996, 1997, 1998, 1999, 2000, 2003, 2022
Malmö RC	6	1967	1959, 1962, 1963, 1964, 1965, 1967
IK Göta	6	1951	1943, 1944, 1947, 1948, 1950, 1951
Älvsjö AIK	5	1956	1952, 1953, 1954, 1955, 1956
IF Attila	5	1968	1957, 1958, 1960, 1961, 1968
Uppsala RFC	3	1977	1969, 1970, 1977
Vänersborgs RK	2	2001	1971‡, 2001
Västerås RK	1	1949	1949
RK Pantern	1	1946	1946
Stockholms RK	1	1945	1945

Notes
† as Exiles RFC
‡ as IFK Vänersborg

=== Women ===
Team	Titles	Most recent win	Years won
Stockholm Exiles RFC	14	2026	1993, 1997, 1998, 2000, 2001, 2004, 2005, 2006, 2007, 2016, 2019, 2023, 2024, 2026
Enköpings RK	7	2025	1984, 1986, 1987, 1999, 2010, 2020, 2025
Göteborg RF	7	2015	2008, 2009, 2011, 2012, 2013, 2014, 2015
Vänersborgs RK	5	2018	1995, 1996, 2002, 2017, 2018
Stockholms RK †	4	1992	1989, 1990, 1991, 1992
Pingvin RC	2	2003	1994, 2003
Skåne RF	2	2022	2021, 2022
Getingarna RK	1	1988	1988
Riddarsporen RK	1	1985	1985
Trollhättan RC	1	1983	1983

Notes
† became part of Stockholm Exiles in 1993

== 2026 Season ==
=== Final Standings ===
Position	Team
2025 SM-Guld	Enköpings RK
Finalists	Malmö RC
3rd	Lugi Lions RFC or Stockholm Exiles RFC
4th	Lugi Lions RFC or Stockholm Exiles RFC
5th	Hammarby IF Rugby
6th	Spartacus Rugby Club
7th	Erikslunds KF
8th	Pingvin RC
9th	Vänersborgs RK
10th	Uppsala RFC
11th	Kalmar Södra IF
12th	Göteborg RF or IKSU
13th	Göteborg RF or IKSU
14th	Göteborg RF or IKSU

==== North ====
2026 Men's Allsvenskan North	Pld	W	D	L	PF	PA	PD	TB	LB	Pts	Playoff round
Enköpings RK	10	9	0	1	444	137	307	9	1	46	SM - Guld
Stockholm Exiles RFC	10	6	1	3	429	149	280	7	0	33	SM - Guld
Hammarby IF Rugby	10	6	0	4	235	241	-6	6	2	32	5th / 6th
Erikslunds KF	10	4	1	5	225	221	4	4	0	22	7th / 8th
Uppsala RFC	10	4	0	6	211	392	-181	5	0	21	9th / 10th
IKSU	10	0	0	10	101	509	-408	2	0	2	11th thru 14th

Away Home	ENK	ERI	HAM	IKSU	EXI	UPP
ENK		34 - 22	24 - 28	95 - 7	39 - 22	71 - 8
ERI	7 - 20		17 - 10	66 - 10	11 - 31	34 - 5
HAM	12 - 36	36 - 22		34 - 14	29 - 19	17 - 22
IKSU	0 - 50	20 - 33	14 - 24		7 - 58	5 + 47
EXI	19 - 29	10 - 10	49 - 12	66 - 0		85 - 7
UPP	12 - 46	45 - 7	24 - 33	36 - 24	5 - 70	

==== South ====
2026 Men's Allsvenskan South	Pld	W	D	L	PF	PA	PD	TB	LB	Pts	Playoff round
Malmö RC	10	10	0	0	638	63	575	10	0	50	SM - Guld
Lugi Lions RFC	10	7	0	3	307	252	55	7	0	35	SM - Guld
Spartacus Rugby Club	10	4	1	5	301	357	-56	6	0	24	5th / 6th
Pingvin RC	10	5	0	5	243	356	-113	4	0	20	7th / 8th
Vänersborgs RK	10	3	1	6	264	487	-223	6	0	20	9th / 10th
Göteborg RF	10	1	0	9	142	382	-240	3	1	8	11th thru 14th

Away Home	GÖT	LUGI	MAL	PIN	SPA	VRK
GÖT		39 - 10	5 - 57	7 - 17	10 - 43	22 - 26
LUGI	61 - 0		5 - 50	36 - 13	34 - 24	48 - 21
MAL	59 - 3	52 - 0		62 - 7	90 - 0	80 - 0
PIN	35 - 17	17 - 31	7 - 62		24 - 14	72 - 5
SPA	36 - 15	12 - 39	17 - 59	60 - 15		38 - 38
VRK	38 - 24	24 - 43	17 - 67	62 - 36	33 - 57	

==== Division 1 North ====
2026 Division 1 North	Pld	W	D	L	PF	PA	PD	Pts	Playoff round
Stockholm Exiles RFC B	6	6	0	0	398	80	318	30	11th thru 14th
IF Attila RG	8	5	0	3	255	244	11	25	
Uppsala Nomads	3	3	0	0	178	56	122	14	
Stockholm Berserkers RFC	4	0	0	4	83	260	-177	1	
Hammarby Bees	5	0	0	5	82	312	-230	0	

Away Home	ATT	BER	EXI	HAM	UPP
ATT		61 - 30	12 - 66	52 - 21	28 - 0
BER	17 - 53		19 - 81	TBC	TBC
EXI	69 - 5	61 - 17		79 - 5	TBC
HAM	15 - 29	TBC	Aug 30		21 - 73
UPP	26 - 15	TBC	22 - 42	79 - 20	

==== Division 1 South ====
2026 Division 1 South	Pld	W	D	L	PF	PA	PD	Pts	Playoff round
Kalmar Södra IF	4	4	0	0	125	12	113	20	11th thru 14th
Hjälarp/Helsingborg	4	2	0	2	77	104	-27	10	
Göteborg Simbas	4	0	0	4	31	117	-86	1	

Away Home	GÖT	KAL	H / H
GÖT		0 - 24	5 - 36
KAL	28 - 0		28 - 0
H / H	29 - 26	12 - 45	

=== Playoffs ===
==== SM-Guld Herr XV ====
Semifinals
LUGI Lions	19	3	22
Enköping	59	74	133
Stockholm Exiles	18	14	32
Malmö	57	30	87

SM Guld Final
Enköping	45	31	76
Malmö	26	19	45
Bronsmatch
LUGI Lions
Stockholm Exiles

26 September 2026
14:15 CEST (UTC +2)

Malmö RC	57 - 18	Stockholm Exiles RFC

Lindängens IP Rugbyplan

26 September 2026
15:00 CEST (UTC +2)

Lugi Lions RFC	19 - 59	Enköpings RK

Fyrisfjädern IP Rugbyplan

3 October 2026
13:00 CEST (UTC +2)

Enköpings RK	74 - 3	Lugi Lions RFC

Korsängens Idrottsplats

3 October 2026
16:00 CEST (UTC +2)

Stockholm Exiles RFC	14 - 30	Malmö RC

Gubbängens Sportfält

10 October 2026
15:00 CEST (UTC +2)

Malmö RC	26 - 45	Enköpings RK

17 October 2026
13:00 CEST (UTC +2)

Enköpings RK	31 - 19	Malmö RC

10 October 2026
15:00 CEST (UTC +2)

Lugi Lions RFC	v	Stockholm Exiles RFC

==== Fifth / Sixth Place ====
5th / 6th Place
Hammarby	39	31	70
Spartacus	26	41	67

26 September 2026
15:00 CEST (UTC +2)

Spartacus Rugby Club	26 - 39	Hammarby IF Rugby

Lexby IP

3 October 2026
14:00 CEST (UTC +2)

Hammarby IF Rugby	31 - 41	Spartacus Rugby Club

Gubbängens Sportfält

==== Seventh / Eighth Place ====
7th / 8th Place
Erikslund	28	28	56
Pingvin	0	0	0

Erikslunds KF	w/o ( 28 - 0 )	Pingvin RC

Pingvin RC	w/o ( 0 - 28 )	Erikslunds KF

==== Ninth / Tenth Place ====
9th / 10th Place
Uppsala	36	7	43
Vänersborg	19	27	46

26 September 2026
15:00 CEST (UTC +2)

Uppsala RFC	36 - 19	Vänersborgs RK

Fyrisfjädern

3 October 2026
13:00 CEST (UTC +2)

Vänersborgs RK	27 - 7	Uppsala RFC

Vänersborg Arena

==== Eleventh to Fourteenth Places ====
Semi-finals
Div 1 North P1
IKSU
Kalmar Södra	33	21	54
Göteborg	26	3	29

11th/12th Final
Winner semi-final 1
Kalmar Södra
13th/14th Final
Loser semi-final 1
Göteborg

27 September 2026
15:00 CEST (UTC +2)

Göteborg RF	26 - 33	Kalmar Södra IF

Välens Bollplaner Rugbyplan

27 September 2026
15:00 CEST (UTC +2)

Division 1 North Champions	v	IKSU

10 October 2026
15:00 CEST (UTC +2)

Kalmar Södra IF	21 - 3	Göteborg RF

4 October 2026
15:00 CEST (UTC +2)

IKSU	v	Division 1 North Champions

10 October 2026
15:00 CEST (UTC +2)

South Semifinal Winner	v	North Semifinal Winner

10 October 2026
15:00 CEST (UTC +2)

South Semifinal Loser	v	North Semifinal Loser

== 2025 Season ==
=== 2025 SuperAllsvenskan ===
==== Table ====
	Pld	W	D	L	PF	PA	PD	Pts
Stockholm Exiles RFC	4	4	0	0	164	5	+159	16
Pingvin RC	4	1	0	3	97	109	-12	6
Enköpings RK	4	1	0	3	45	192	-147	5
~~Spartacus Rugby Club~~	Withdrew before season began							

==== Results ====
24 May 2025
14:00 CEST (UTC +2)

Enköpings RK	0–56	Pingvin RC

Korsängens IP

31 May 2025
14:00 CEST (UTC +2)

Stockholm Exiles RFC	45–0	Pingvin RC

Gubbängsfältet

7 June 2025
15:00 CEST (UTC +2)

Enköpings RK	0-50	Stockholm Exiles RFC

Korsängens IP

14 June 2025
14:00 CEST (UTC +2)

Pingvin RC	5-19	Stockholm Exiles RFC

Trelleborg Rugby Arena

9 August 2025
14:00 CEST (UTC +2)

Pingvin RC	36-45	Enköpings RK

Trelleborg Rugby Arena

16 August 2025
14:00 CEST (UTC +2)

Stockholm Exiles RFC	50-0	Enköpings RK

Gubbängsfältet

==== Grand Final ====
27 September 2025
15:00 CEST (UTC +2)

Pingvin RC	0-10	Stockholm Exiles RFC

Trelleborg Rugby Arena

4 October 2025
15:00 CEST (UTC +2)

Stockholm Exiles RFC	46-19	Pingvin RC

Gubbängsfältet

Stockholm Exiles RFC win 56-19 on aggregate

=== 2025 Allsvenskan ===
==== North ====
	Pld	W	D	L	PF	PA	PD	Pts
Stockholm Exiles RFC B	10	9	0	1	407	146	+261	18
Erikslund KF	10	8	0	2	433	99	+334	16
Uppsala RFC	10	7	0	3	425	169	+256	14
Hammarby IF Rugby	10	3	1	6	208	336	-128	6
IKSU	10	1	1	8	181	429	-248	2
IF Attila	10	1	0	9	91	556	-465	2

Results

17 May 2025
14:00 CEST (UTC +2)

Erikslund KF	62-0	IKSU

Täby Rugby Center

17 May 2025
15:00 CEST (UTC +2)

Hammarby IF Rugby	76-12	IF Attila

Gubbängsfältet

17 May 2025
15:00 CEST (UTC +2)

Uppsala RFC	52-12	Stockholm Exiles B

Fyrisfjädern

24 May 2025
14:00 CEST (UTC +2)

Uppsala RFC	39-0	Hammarby IF Rugby

Fyrisfjädern

24 May 2025
14:00 CEST (UTC +2)

Erikslund KF	7-8	Stockholm Exiles B

Täby Rugby Center

24 May 2025
15:00 CEST (UTC +2)

IF Attila	24-22	IKSU

Bromma Sportfält Rugby

7 June 2025
14:00 CEST (UTC +2)

IF Attila	21-26	Hammarby IF Rugby

Bromma Sportfält Rugby

7 June 2025
14:00 CEST (UTC +2)

IKSU	15-31	Erikslund KF

Nydalafältet

7 June 2025
16:00 CEST (UTC +2)

Stockholm Exiles B	29-26	Uppsala RFC

Gubbängsfältet

14 June 2025
14:00 CEST (UTC +2)

IF Attila	15-76	Stockholm Exiles B

Bromma Sportfält Rugby

14 June 2025
14:00 CEST (UTC +2)

Erikslund KF	39-14	Uppsala RFC

Täby Rugby Center

14 June 2025
15:00 CEST (UTC +2)

IKSU	17-36	Hammarby IF Rugby

Nydalafältet

28 June 2025
12:00 CEST (UTC +2)

Erikslund KF	52-5	Hammarby IF Rugby

Täby Rugby Center

28 June 2025
14:00 CEST (UTC +2)

IKSU	5-44	Stockholm Exiles B

Nydalafältet

28 June 2025
14:00 CEST (UTC +2)

Uppsala RFC	45-0	IF Attila

Fyrisfjädern

9 August 2025
14:00 CEST (UTC +2)

Stockholm Exiles B	66-3	Hammarby IF Rugby

Gubbängsfältet

9 August 2025
14:00 CEST (UTC +2)

IKSU	36-40	Uppsala RFC

Nydalafältet

9 August 2025
14:00 CEST (UTC +2)

Erikslund KF	105-0	IF Attila

Täby Rugby Center

16 August 2025
12:00 CEST (UTC +2)

Hammarby IF Rugby	19-29	Uppsala RFC

Gubbängsfältet

16 August 2025
14:00 CEST (UTC +2)

IKSU	38-12	IF Attila

Nydalafältet

16 August 2025
16:00 CEST (UTC +2)

Stockholm Exiles B	22-14	Erikslund KF

Gubbängsfältet

6 September 2025
12:00 CEST (UTC +2)

Hammarby IF Rugby	5-44	Stockholm Exiles B

Gubbängsfältet

6 September 2025
14:00 CEST (UTC +2)

Uppsala RFC	100-5	IKSU

Fyrisfjädern

6 September 2025
15:00 CEST (UTC +2)

IF Attila	0-69	Erikslund KF

Bromma Sportfält Rugby

13 September 2025
10:00 CEST (UTC +2)

Stockholm Exiles B	50-0	IF Attila

Gubbängsfältet

13 September 2025
12:00 CEST (UTC +2)

Uppsala RFC	21-22	Erikslund KF

Fyrisfjädern

13 September 2025
16:00 CEST (UTC +2)

Hammarby IF Rugby	24-24	IKSU

Gubbängsfältet

27 September 2025
14:00 CEST (UTC +2)

Hammarby IF Rugby	14-32	Erikslund KF

Gubbängsfältet

27 September 2025
14:00 CEST (UTC +2)

IF Attila	7-59	Uppsala RFC

Bromma Sportfält Rugby

27 September 2025
16:00 CEST (UTC +2)

Stockholm Exiles B	56-19	IKSU

Gubbängsfältet

==== South ====
	Pld	W	D	L	PF	PA	PD	Pts
Malmö RC	6	4	0	2	240	130	+110	8
Göteborg RF	6	3	1	2	150	154	-4	6
Lugi Lions RFC	6	2	1	3	141	181	-40	4
Vänersborgs RK	6	2	0	4	156	222	-66	4

Results

10 May 2025
14:00 CEST (UTC +2)

Vänersborgs RK	27-35	Malmö RC

Vänersborgs Arena

17 May 2025
14:00 CEST (UTC +2)

Göteborg RF	43-19	Vänersborgs RK

Välen

24 May 2025
14:00 CEST (UTC +2)

Lugi Lions RFC	52-19	Vänersborgs RK

Centrala IP

24 May 2025
14:00 CEST (UTC +2)

Malmö RC	26-5	Göteborg RF

Lindängens IP

31 May 2025
14:00 CEST (UTC +2)

Göteborg RF	31-12	Lugi Lions RFC

Välen

14 June 2025
14:00 CEST (UTC +2)

Lugi Lions RFC	33-31	Malmö RC

Centrala IP

16 August 2025
14:00 CEST (UTC +2)

Vänersborgs RK	41-13	Göteborg RF

Vänersborgs Arena

16 August 2025
14:00 CEST (UTC +2)

Malmö RC	45-12	Lugi Lions RFC

Lindängens IP

6 September 2025
13:00 CEST (UTC +2)

Malmö RC	64-12	Vänersborgs RK

Lindängens IP

6 September 2025
15:00 CEST (UTC +2)

Lugi Lions RFC	17-17	Göteborg RF

Centrala IP

13 September 2025
14:00 CEST (UTC +2)

Vänersborgs RK	38-15	Lugi Lions RFC

Vänersborgs Arena

13 September 2025
14:00 CEST (UTC +2)

Göteborg RF	41-39	Malmö RC

Välen

==== 7th / 8th Place Final ====
4 October 2025
12:00 CET (UTC +1)

Hammarby IF Rugby	22-10	Vänersborgs RK

==== 5th / 6th Place Final ====
4 October 2025
12:00 CET (UTC +1)

Lugi Lions RFC	29-7	Uppsala RFC

11 October 2025
12:00 CET (UTC +1)

Uppsala RFC	29-12	Lugi Lions RFC

Lugi Lions RFC win 41-36 on aggregate

==== 3rd / 4th Place Final ====
4 October 2025
12:00 CET (UTC +1)

Erikslund KF	49-10	Göteborg RF

11 October 2025
12:00 CET (UTC +1)

Göteborg RF	31-25	Erikslund KF

Erikslund KF win 74-41 on aggregate

==== Grand Final ====
4 October 2025
12:00 CET (UTC +1)

Malmö RC	22-0	Stockholm Exiles B

Lindängens IP

=== Division 1 North ===
==== Table ====
	Pld	W	D	L	PF	PA	PD	Pts
Uppsala RFC B	2	2	0	0	112	38	+74	4
Stockholm Rugby U20	1	1	0	0	71	5	+66	2
Stockholm Berserkers RFC	3	0	0	3	43	183	-140	0

Results

18 May 2025
14:00 CEST (UTC +2)

Stockholm Rugby U20	71-5	Stockholm Berserkers RFC

Gubbängsfältet

28 June 2025
14:00 CEST (UTC +2)

Stockholm Berserkers RFC	26-75	Uppsala RFC B

Gubbängsfältet

28 June 2025
14:00 CEST (UTC +2)

Uppsala RFC B	37-12	Stockholm Berserkers RFC

Fyrisfjädern

== 2024 Season ==
=== 2024 SuperAllsvenskan ===
	Pld	W	D	L	PF	PA	PD	Pts
Stockholm Exiles RFC	12	11	0	1	641	196	+445	56
Spartacus Rugby Club	12	7	0	5	368	354	+14	38
Enköpings RK	12	5	0	7	287	431	-144	25
Pingvin RC	12	1	0	11	201	516	-315	6

Results

11 May 2024
15:00 CEST (UTC +2)

Stockholm Exiles RFC	64-0	Pingvin RC

Gubbängsfältet

11 May 2024
15:00 CEST (UTC +2)

Enköpings RK	3-37	Spartacus Rugby Club

Korsängen

18 May 2024
14:00 CEST (UTC +2)

Pingvin RC	17-25	Enköpings RK

Gubbängen Rugby Arena

18 May 2024
14:00 CEST (UTC +2)

Spartacus Rugby Club	26-42	Stockholm Exiles RFC

Lexby Idrottsplats

25 May 2024
15:00 CEST (UTC +2)

Enköpings RK	14-71	Stockholm Exiles RFC

Korsängen

25 May 2024
15:00 CEST (UTC +2)

Spartacus Rugby Club	52-21	Pingvin RC

Lexby Idrottsplats

1 June 2024
14:00 CEST (UTC +2)

Stockholm Exiles RFC	55-19	Enköpings RK

Gubbängsfältet

1 June 2024
14:00 CEST (UTC +2)

Pingvin RC	12-27	Spartacus Rugby Club

Pilevallen

8 June 2024
14:00 CEST (UTC +2)

Enköpings RK	34-12	Pingvin RC

Korsängen

8 June 2024
15:00 CEST (UTC +2)

Stockholm Exiles RFC	46-17	Spartacus Rugby Club

Gubbängsfältet

29 June 2024
13:00 CEST (UTC +2)

Pingvin RC	7-78	Stockholm Exiles RFC

Pilevallen

29 June 2024
14:00 CEST (UTC +2)

Spartacus Rugby Club	29-17	Enköpings RK

Lexby Idrottsplats

10 August 2024
14:00 CEST (UTC +2)

Stockholm Exiles RFC	37-17	Pingvin RC

Gubbängsfältet

10 August 2024
15:00 CEST (UTC +2)

Enköpings RK	34-31	Spartacus Rugby Club

Korsängen

17 August 2024
14:00 CEST (UTC +2)

Pingvin RC	29-21	Enköpings RK

Pilevallen

24 August 2024
15:00 CEST (UTC +2)

Spartacus Rugby Club	20-38	Stockholm Exiles RFC

Lexby Idrottsplats

31 August 2024
14:00 CEST (UTC +2)

Spartacus Rugby Club	39-20	Pingvin RC

Lexby Idrottsplats

31 August 2024
14:00 CEST (UTC +2)

Stockholm Exiles RFC	54-22	Enköpings RK

Gubbängsfältet

7 September 2024
15:00 CEST (UTC +2)

Enköpings RK	20-17	Stockholm Exiles RFC

Korsängen

7 September 2024
15:00 CEST (UTC +2)

Pingvin RC	21-22	Spartacus Rugby Club

Pilevallen

14 September 2024
14:00 CEST (UTC +2)

Enköpings RK	45-29	Pingvin RC

Korsängen

14 September 2024
15:00 CEST (UTC +2)

Stockholm Exiles RFC	67-17	Spartacus Rugby Club

Pilevallen

28 September 2024
13:30 CEST (UTC +2)

Pingvin RC	17-72	Stockholm Exiles RFC

Pilevallen

28 September 2024
13:30 CET (UTC +1)

Spartacus Rugby Club	51-33	Enköpings RK

Lexby Idrottsplats

=== 2024 Allsvenskan ===
==== North / East ====
	Pld	W	D	L	PF	PA	PD	Pts
Stockholm Exiles RFC B	6	4	0	2	203	146	+57	22
Erikslund KF	6	4	0	2	146	122	+24	19
Hammarby IF Rugby	6	3	0	3	146	154	-8	17
Uppsala RFC	6	1	0	5	110	183	-73	5

North / East Results

11 May 2024
13:00 CEST (UTC +2)

Hammarby IF Rugby	17-24	Stockholm Exiles B

Täby Rugbycenter

11 May 2024
14:00 CEST (UTC +2)

Uppsala RFC	10-28	Erikslund KF

Skarpnäcks Sportfält

18 May 2024
11:00 CEST (UTC +2)

Hammarby IF Rugby	31-17	Uppsala RFC

Skarpnäcks Sportfält

18 May 2024
14:00 CEST (UTC +2)

Erikslund KF	15-26	Stockholm Exiles B

Täby Rugbycenter

25 May 2024
14:00 CEST (UTC +2)

Uppsala RFC	53-33	Stockholm Exiles B

Årsta Rugbycenter

25 May 2024
14:30 CEST (UTC +2)

Hammarby IF Rugby	20-24	Erikslund KF

Skarpnäcks Sportfält

1 June 2024
14:00 CEST (UTC +2)

Erikslund KF	21-26	Hammarby IF Rugby

Fyrisfjädern

1 June 2024
16:00 CEST (UTC +2)

Stockholm Exiles B	20-24	Uppsala RFC

Årsta Rugbycenter

17 August 2024
14:00 CEST (UTC +2)

Erikslund KF	22-14	Uppsala RFC

Fyrisfjädern

17 August 2024
14:00 CEST (UTC +2)

Stockholm Exiles B	58-19	Hammarby IF Rugby

Årsta Rugbycenter

24 August 2024
14:00 CEST (UTC +2)

Uppsala RFC	10-33	Hammarby IF Rugby

Fyrisfjädern

24 August 2024
14:00 CEST (UTC +2)

Stockholm Exiles B	26-36	Erikslund KF

Årsta Rugbycenter

==== South / West ====
	Pld	W	D	L	PF	PA	PD	Pts
Malmö RC	6	5	0	1	281	127	+154	24
Lugi Lions RFC	6	4	0	2	200	128	+72	20
Göteborg RF	6	3	0	3	154	148	+6	18
Vänersborgs RK	6	0	0	6	94	326	-232	1

South / West Results

27 April 2024
14:00 CEST (UTC +2)

Lugi Lions RFC	12-39	Malmö RC

Centrala IP

4 May 2024
14:00 CEST (UTC +2)

Malmö RC	17-12	Göteborg RF

Lindängens Idrottsplats

11 May 2024
14:00 CEST (UTC +2)

Göteborg RF	20-10	Lugi Lions RFC

Välen

11 May 2024
14:00 CEST (UTC +2)

Vänersborgs RK	24-60	Malmö RC

Vänersborgs Arena

18 May 2024
14:00 CEST (UTC +2)

Lugi Lions RFC	70-3	Vänersborgs RK

Centrala IP

25 May 2024
14:00 CEST (UTC +2)

Malmö RC	22-32	Lugi Lions RFC

Lindängens Idrottsplats

25 May 2024
14:00 CEST (UTC +2)

Göteborg RF	41-17	Vänersborgs RK

Välen

1 June 2024
14:00 CEST (UTC +2)

Vänersborgs RK	12-28	Göteborg RF

Vänersborgs Arena

17 August 2024
14:00 CEST (UTC +2)

Malmö RC	82-21	Vänersborgs RK

Lindängens Idrottsplats

17 August 2024
15:00 CEST (UTC +2)

Lugi Lions RFC	31-27	Göteborg RF

Centrala IP

24 August 2024
14:00 CEST (UTC +2)

Vänersborgs RK	17-45	Lugi Lions RFC

Vänersborgs Arena

24 August 2024
14:00 CEST (UTC +2)

Göteborg RF	26-61	Malmö RC

Välen

==== Placement Playoffs ====
31 August 2024

Hammarby IF Rugby	76-12	Vänersborgs RK

7 September 2024

Vänersborgs RK	33-31	Hammarby IF Rugby

Hammarby IF Rugby win 107-45 on aggregate to progress to the 5th/6th place final

31 August 2024

Göteborg RF	53-15	Uppsala RFC

7 September 2024

Uppsala RFC	55-0	Göteborg RF

Uppsala RFC win 70-53 on aggregate to progress to the 5th/6th place final

==== 7th / 8th Final ====
14 September

Vänersborgs RK	7-43	Göteborg RF

==== 5th / 6th Final ====
14 September 2024

Uppsala RFC	17-3	Hammarby IF Rugby

28 September 2024

Hammarby IF Rugby	38-7	Uppsala RFC

Hammarby IF Rugby win 41-24 on aggregate to place 5th

==== Semi-Finals ====
31 August 2024
14:00 CEST (UTC +2)

Stockholm Exiles B	31-28	Lugi Lions RFC

7 September 2024
13:00 CEST (UTC +2)

Lugi Lions RFC	21-15	Stockholm Exiles B

Lugi Lions RFC win 49-46 on aggregate

31 August 2024
15:00 CEST (UTC +2)

Malmö RC	33-32	Erikslund KF

7 September 2024
14:00 CEST (UTC +2)

Erikslund KF	27-14	Malmö RC

Erikslund KF win 59-47 on aggregate

==== Grand Final ====
14 September 2024
15:00 CEST (UTC +2)

Lugi Lions RFC	37-17	Erikslund KF

28 September 2024
14:00 CEST (UTC +2)

Erikslund KF	31-15	Lugi Lions RFC

Lugi Lions RFC win 52-48 on aggregate

== 2023 Season ==
The 2023 season ran in two parts. The first half of the season consisted of three regional pools of three teams each. The second half was run on a national basis over two divisions.

=== 2023 Allsvenskan - Regional Pools ===
2023 Allsvenskan West Region Results
2023 Allsvenskan Skåne Region Results
2023 Allsvenskan North Region Results

West Region	Pld	W	D	L	PF	PA	PD	Pts
Spartacus	4	4	0	0	207	46	+61	20
Göteborg RF	4	2	0	2	210	80	+130	10
Vänersborgs RK	4	0	0	4	21	232	-211	0

Skåne Region	Pld	W	D	L	PF	PA	PD	Pts
Lugi Lions	4	3	0	1	79	83	+4	13
Pingvin RC	4	2	0	2	127	74	+53	12
Malmö RC	4	1	0	3	67	116	-49	5

North Region	Pld	W	D	L	PF	PA	PD	Pts
Stockholm Exiles RFC	4	4	0	0	151	55	+96	19
Enköpings RK	4	1	0	3	98	100	-2	8
NRK Trojan	4	1	0	3	51	145	-94	5

=== 2023 Allsvenskan 3or ===
2023 Allsvenskan 3or Results

	Pld	W	D	L	PF	PA	PD	Pts
NRK Trojan	6	5	0	1	208	103	+105	25
Malmö RC	6	4	0	2	283	97	+86	22
Göteborg RF	6	2	0	4	129	164	-35	11
Vänersborgs RK	6	1	0	5	83	339	-256	5

=== 2023 SuperAllsvenskan ===
2023 SuperAllsvenskan Results

	Pld	W	D	L	PF	PA	PD	Pts
Stockholm Exiles RFC	8	8	0	0	439	81	+358	39
Enköpings RK	8	6	0	2	285	185	+100	31
Spartacus Rugby Club	8	4	0	4	242	234	+8	22
Lugi Lions RFC	8	2	0	6	219	371	-152	12
Pingvin RC	8	0	0	8	48	362	-314	1

== 2022 Season ==
=== 2022 SuperAllsvenskan ===
2022 SuperAllsvenskan Results

	Pld	W	D	L	PF	PA	PD	Pts
Pingvin RC	12	9	0	3	294	216	+78	42
Stockholm Exiles RFC	12	8	0	4	312	214	+98	38
Enköpings RK	12	7	0	5	337	181	+156	36
NRK Trojan	12	0	0	12	150	482	-332	3
