= Pontocerebellar hypoplasia =

Group of neurodegenerative disorders

- Other names: Non-syndromic pontocerebellar hypoplasia
- Pontocerebellar hypoplasia is inherited in an autosomal recessive manner.
- Specialty: Neurology
- Symptoms: Intellectual disability, movement problems
- Treatment: Unknown

Pontocerebellar hypoplasia (PCH) is a heterogeneous group of rare neurodegenerative disorders caused by genetic mutations and characterised by progressive atrophy of various parts of the brain such as the cerebellum or brainstem (particularly the pons). Where known, these disorders are inherited in an autosomal recessive fashion. There is no known cure for PCH.

== Signs and symptoms ==
There are different signs and symptoms for different forms of pontocerebellar hypoplasia, at least six of which have been described by researchers. All forms involve abnormal development of the brain, leading to slow development, movement problems, and intellectual impairment.

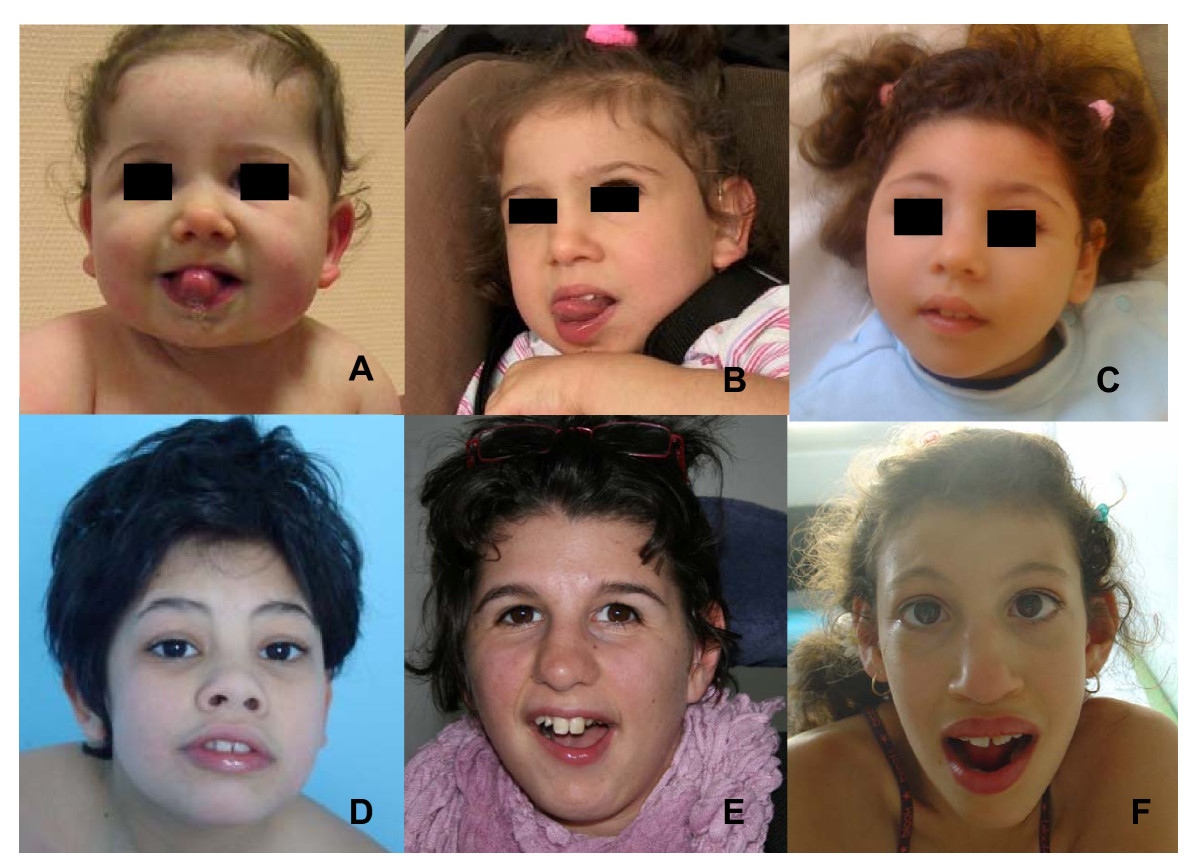
Facial features (dysmorphism) of patients with one form of pontocerebellar hypoplasia due to mutations in the CASK gene. A and B: patient at 1 year (A) and 4 years (B). C: patient, 18 months. D: patient, 13 years. E: patient, 13 years. F: patient, 12 years. Note minor facial dysmorphism: round face, small chin, well-drawn eyebrows in the younger patients; longer face, high and large nasal bridge, long nose, protruding maxilla, in the older patients.

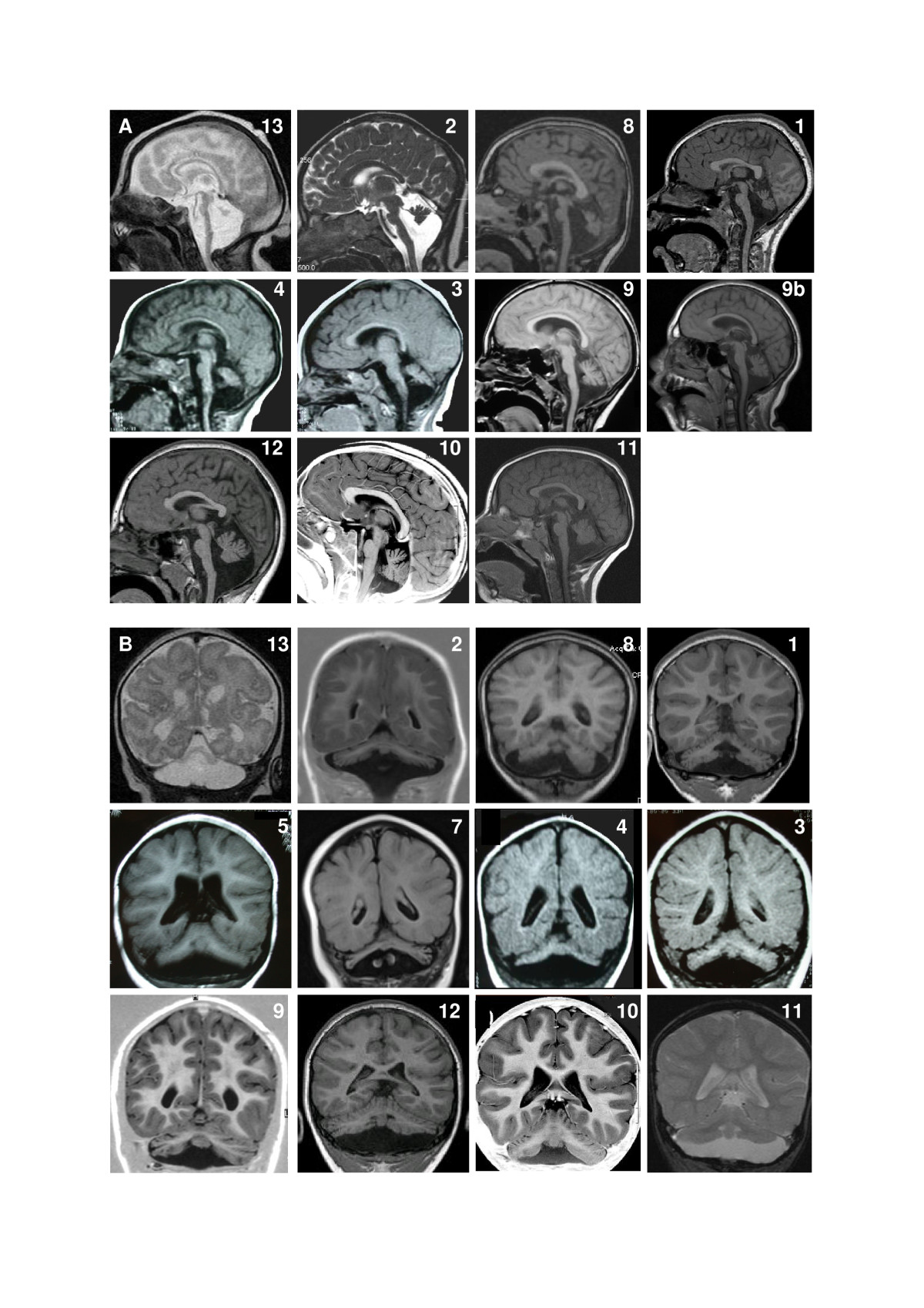
Magnetic resonance imaging (MRI) examples of patients with pontocerebellar hypoplasia with CASK mutations. A. Sagittal images showing different degrees of hypoplasia (incomplete formation) of the pons and vermis (parts of the brain). Numbers represent different patients.

== Causes ==
Pontocerebellar hypoplasia is caused by mutations in genes including Sepsecs gene, VRK1 (PCH1); TSEN2, TSEN34 (PCH2); RARS2 (PCH6); and TSEN54 (PCH2 and PCH4). The genes associated with PCH3 and PCH5 have not yet been identified.

The mutated genes in PCH are autosomal recessive, which means that parents of an affected child each carry only one copy of the damaged gene. In each parent the other copy performs its proper function and they display no signs of PCH. A child inheriting two damaged copies of the gene will be affected by PCH.

== Mechanism ==
Mutations in the genes that cause PCH produce faults in the production of chemicals, usually enzymes, that are required for the development of nerve cells (neurons) and for properly processing RNA, which is needed for any cell to function normally. The exact mechanism by which PCH affects the development of the cerebellum and pons is not well understood.

== Diagnosis ==
=== Classification ===
Pontocerebellar hypoplasia is classified as follows:

Type	OMIM	Gene	Locus	Distinctive features	Alternate names
PCH1A	607596	VRK1	14q32	Infantile onset anterior horn cell degeneration resulting in progressive muscle atrophy; resembles infantile spinal muscular atrophy	Spinal muscular atrophy with pontocerebellar hypoplasia (SMA-PCH)
PCH1B	614678	EXOSC3	9p13.2	Cerebellar and spinal motor neuron degeneration beginning at birth and resulting in decreased body tone, respiratory insufficiency, muscle atrophy, progressive microcephaly and global developmental delay	
PCH2A	277470	TSEN54	17q25.1	Dyskinetic movements, seizures (frequently)	Volendam neurodegenerative disease
PCH2B	612389	TSEN2	3p25.2		
PCH2C	612390	TSEN34	19q13.42		
PCH2D	613811	SEPSECS	4p15.2		Progressive cerebello-cerebral atrophy (PCCA)
PCH2E	615851	VPS53	17p13.3	Profound mental retardation, progressive microcephaly, spasticity, and early-onset epilepsy	
PCH2F	617026	TSEN15	1q25.3	Variable neurologic signs and symptoms, including cognitive and motor delay, poor or absent speech, seizures, and spasticity	
PCH3	608027	PCLO	7q11–q21	Seizures, short stature, optic atrophy, progressive microcephaly, severe developmental delay; described only in a handful of cases.	CLAM-PCH, cerebellar atrophy with progressive microcephaly
PCH4	225753	TSEN54	17q25.1	Severe prenatal form of PCH2 with excess fluid in the amniotic sac, muscle contractures, brief involuntary muscle twitching, brief episodes without breathing, and early death following birth	
PCH5	610204	TSEN54	17q25.1	Severe prenatal form, described in one family	Olivopontocerebellar hypoplasia (OPCH)
PCH6	611523	RARS2	6q15	Severe encephalopathy in the newborn with hypotonia, and inconstantly: intractable seizures, edema, increased lactate blood levels, mitochondrial respiratory chain defects	
PCH7	614969	TOE1	1p34.1	Hypotonia, apneic episodes, seizures, vanishing testis	
PCH8	614961	CHMP1A	16q24.3	Severe psychomotor retardation, abnormal movements, hypotonia, spasticity, and variable visual defects	
PCH9	615809	AMPD2	1p13.3	Severely delayed psychomotor development, progressive microcephaly, spasticity, seizures, and brain abnormalities, including brain atrophy, thin corpus callosum, and delayed myelination	
PCH10	615803	CLP1	11q12.1	Severely delayed psychomotor development, progressive microcephaly, spasticity, seizures, and brain abnormalities, including brain atrophy and delayed myelination	

Pontine and cerebellar hypoplasia is also observed in certain phenotypes of X-linked mental retardation – so called MICPCH.

Another gene that has been associated with this condition is coenzyme A synthase (COASY).

== Outcomes ==
The severity of different forms of PCH varies, but many children inheriting the mutated gene responsible do not survive infancy or childhood; nevertheless, some individuals born with PCH have reached adulthood.

== See also ==
- Mental retardation and microcephaly with pontine and cerebellar hypoplasia
