= Vänersborgs RK =

Swedish Rugby club

Vänersborgs Rugbyklubb
- Founded: 1970
- Location: Vänersborg, Sweden
- Chairman: Peter Larsson
Team kit

Vänersborgs RK is a Swedish rugby club in Vänersborg. They currently play in Allsvenskan South.

== History ==
The club was founded on 26 January 1970 as the rugby section of IFK Vänersborg by Wieslaw Buczynski, a former Poland international and coach of Malmö RC. They played their first match in March 1970 against Spartacus. In 1986 the club parted ways with the sports club and became an independent rugby team.
