= IF Attila =

Swedish rugby club

Sweden
- Full name: Attila Rugby Club
- Union: Swedish Rugby Union
- Location: Stockholm, Sweden
- League: Allsvenskan
Team kit

Official website
- www.attilarugby.com

IF Attila, or Attila Rugby Club, the association's real name, is the oldest existing rugby club in Sweden. It was started in 1949.

The club has been located at a number of grounds over its long history, but currently plays at Bromma Sportsfield in the North of the city of Stockholm. The club has both men's, old boys, women's and junior's teams and also have members of the vintage Vikings old boys touring side.

The club has won national championships for men XV four times, 1957, 1958, 1961, and 1968 and the Women's team was in the national finals in 2004 but was defeated by Stockholm Exiles RFC.

Attila RG is known as perhaps the most social rugby club in Sweden the club can often be found in its sponsor pub in the Old Town after matches. The club is also one of the clubs who go abroad on tour often and only in recent years has been in Finland, Denmark, Estonia, Czech Republic, Spain, Poland, Italy, England, Ireland, France, Germany and Wales and played rugby and spread their own special Attila spirit.

The Club brand is a bulldog and the club's colors are blue and red.
