= Rugby union in Sweden =

- Country: Sweden
- Governing body: Swedish Rugby Union
- National team: Sweden
- First played: 1931
- Registered players: 3,467
- Clubs: 36

National competitions
- Rugby World Cup; Rugby World Cup Sevens; IRB Sevens World Series; European Nations Cup

Club competitions
- Allsvenskan

Rugby union in Sweden is a minor but growing sport. The Swedish Rugby Union (Swedish: Svenska Rugbyförbundet) was founded in 1932, and joined the IRB in 1988.

== History ==
"Swedish football" in the nineteenth century was a variant of association football with some rugby elements. By 1900, Swedish football clubs were using the Football Association's rules, with no rugby influence.

The pure form of rugby was introduced between the wars. The visiting cruisers of the British Royal Navy, HMS Dorsetshire and HMS Norfolk played the first recorded match in Stockholm The sport became well established in this period thanks also to the efforts of Yves Gylden, who had learnt the game in France, and founded the first three Swedish clubs in Stockholm.

As with many other countries in Europe, the Second World War nearly finished off the game. Sweden was neutral in this conflict, meaning that the game did not suffer the war casualties that it did in other countries. By 1960, the number of active clubs had declined to fewer than ten. This was remedied in the 60s and 70s by an intensive development programme, which helped to bring that figure up to at least 55 clubs in the mid 90s.

A persistent problem for Swedish rugby has been the climate, which means that many pitches may be under snow for large parts of the year. For this reason rugby is a summer sport in Sweden, the season running from late April to the middle of October.

Notable players include:

- Kari Tapper, a Number 8, who played for the Barbarians
- Kanogo Njuru, an Outside centre, who played for the Barbarians.
- Ale Loman, a prop who plays for Leicester Tigers.

== Club Rugby ==
The Allsvenskan is currently the highest tier of the national rugby union competition in Sweden. The first Swedish championship took place in 1943. The current champions (2025) are Stockholm Exiles RFC. Under the Allsvenskan is two levels of regional competition.

Beginning in the 2010 season, a national rugby sevens series began to be played over multiple weekends. This initiative comes from the decision by the IOC to include rugby sevens in the Olympics.

The Swedish club champions have in the past competed for the club Nordic Cup with fellow club champions of Denmark, Finland and Norway.

== See also ==
- Sweden national rugby union team
- Allsvenskan - Sweden's highest rugby union league
