= VRK =

VRK may refer to:

- Central Electoral Commission (Lithuania) (Lithuanian: Vyriausioji rinkimų komisija)
- Military Revolutionary Committee (Russian: Военно-революционный комитет)
- Population Register Centre (Finland) (Finnish: Väestörekisterikeskus)
- Varkaus Airport, regional airport in Finland
- VRK1, gene and enzyme
- VRK2, gene and enzyme
- VRK Tigrarna, Swedish rugby team
- Very restricted knowledge
