= Dustin Jinka =

South African rugby union player

- Born: 28 April 1986 (age 40) Cape Town, South Africa
- Height: 1.76 m (5 ft 9 1/2 in)
- Weight: 82 kg (12 st 13 lb; 181 lb)
- School: Bishop's College, Cape Town

Rugby union career
- Position: Scrum-half
- Current team: Hammarby
Youth career
- 2006–2007: Western Province
Amateur team(s)
| Years | Team | Apps | (Points) |
| 2006–2007 | Maties / Victorians | | |
| 2008 | Tygerberg | | |
| 2008–2009 | De La Salle Palmerston | | |
| 2009–2010, 2012–2013 | Hamiltons | | |
| 2016–present | Hammarby | | |
Senior career
| Years | Team | Apps | (Points) |
| 2010 | Western Province | 5 | (7) |
| 2010–2011 | Blue Bulls | 20 | (5) |
| 2011 | Bulls | 0 | (0) |
| 2014 | Griquas | 11 | (19) |
- Correct as of 12 September 2014
Coaching career
- Years: Team
- 2016–present: Hammarby

Dustin Jinka (born 28 April 1986) is a South African former professional rugby union player whose regular position was scrum-half. In 2016, Jinka became the head coach of Swedish Allsvenskan side Hammarby.

== Career ==
=== Youth and amateur rugby ===
Following his performances at club rugby level for university side Maties (and their second team, Victorians), Jinka was called into the Western Province U21 squad for the 2006 Under-21 Provincial Championship. He was named in their senior side for the 2007 Vodacom Cup competition, but was never involved in a matchday squad. He was once again included in the Western Province U21 side for the Under-21 Provincial Championship in 2007.

After an unsuccessful trial at the Boland Cavaliers at the start of 2008, he returned to club rugby with Tygerberg in the Western Province Super League A. He then had a spell playing club rugby in Ireland for De La Salle Palmerston, before he returned to the Western Province to join Hamiltons for the 2009 season.

Jinka had a standout season with Hamiltons, being rated as one of their star players and helping the side win the National Club Championship in 2009, scoring 101 points. He was also subsequently voted as the National Club Championship Player of the Year for 2009.

=== Western Province ===
After another trial with the Boland Cavaliers at the start of 2010, Western Province Vodacom Cup coach Jerome Paarwater included Jinka in the squad for the 2010 Vodacom Cup competition. Although he didn't come off the bench in their opening match of the season against the Boland Cavaliers, he made his first class debut in their next match against the Sharks XV by coming on as a very late replacement. He made his first start two weeks later in their match against the Border Bulldogs, kicking a conversion in a 29–0 victory. His first try came a few weeks later in their match against the SWD Eagles, scoring just five minutes after coming on as a substitute to help his side to a 29–23 victory. In total, he scored seven points in five appearances in the competition.

=== Blue Bulls ===
At the conclusion of the Vodacom Cup in 2010, Jinka moved to Pretoria to join the Blue Bulls. He made his Currie Cup debut for the Blue Bulls during the 2010 Currie Cup Premier Division match against the Leopards at Loftus Versfeld. He made just one start (against the Pumas) and three substitute appearances during the season.

During the 2011 Vodacom Cup, Jinka was included in the squad for all eleven matches in their season and made four starts and played off the bench on three occasions. He also scored his first points for the Blue Bulls, kicking a penalty and a conversion in their 23–25 loss to the SWD Eagles. He was included in the Bulls squad for the 2011 Super Rugby season, but, despite being named on the bench for their matches against the Cheetahs, the Waratahs and the Stormers, he never made an appearance.

Jinka started the Blue Bulls' first four matches of the 2011 Currie Cup Premier Division season, but just made four more appearances for the remainder of the season and being an unused substitute six times.

=== Eastern Province Kings / Return to Hamiltons ===
At the start of 2012, Jinka had an unsuccessful trial with Port Elizabeth-based side the Eastern Province Kings. and he returned to his former club side Hamiltons, where he played club rugby for the next two seasons.

=== Griquas ===
Jinka made a return to provincial rugby in 2014, when he joined Kimberley-based outfit Griquas. He made seven appearances for them during the 2014 Vodacom Cup competition, contributing 19 points which consisted of seven conversions in his only start in their match against the Limpopo Blue Bulls and a try in their match against the Falcons.
