= TSEN54 (gene) =

Protein-coding gene in the species Homo sapiens

Identifiers
- Aliases: TSEN54, PCH2A, PCH4, SEN54L, sen54, PCH5, tRNA splicing endonuclease subunit 54
- External IDs: OMIM: 608755; MGI: 1923515; GeneCards: TSEN54

Gene location (Human)
Chr.	Chromosome 17 (human)
Band	17q25.1	Start	75,515,944 bp
Band	17q25.1	End	75,524,735 bp

Gene location (Mouse)
Chr.	Chromosome 11 (mouse)
Band	11|11 E2	Start	115,705,550 bp
Band	11|11 E2	End	115,713,920 bp
RNA expression pattern
Bgee	Human / Mouse (ortholog); Top expressed in: granulocyte; right uterine tube; cerebellar hemisphere; right hemisphere of cerebellum; skin of arm; mucosa of transverse colon; body of pancreas; pylorus; cardia; right lobe of thyroid gland / Top expressed in: yolk sac; right kidney; embryo; neural layer of retina; epiblast; otic vesicle; proximal tubule; embryo; lip; muscle of thigh; More reference expression data
BioGPS	n/a
Gene ontology
Molecular function	tRNA-intron endonuclease activity; protein binding
Cellular component	nucleolus; nucleus; tRNA-intron endonuclease complex; nucleoplasm
Biological process	mRNA processing; tRNA-type intron splice site recognition and cleavage; RNA phosphodiester bond hydrolysis, endonucleolytic; tRNA splicing, via endonucleolytic cleavage and ligation; RNA phosphodiester bond hydrolysis; tRNA processing
Sources:Amigo / QuickGO
Orthologs
Databases	NCBI: entry; OMA: entry
Species	Human	Mouse
Entrez	283989	76265
Ensembl	ENSG00000182173	ENSMUSG00000020781
UniProt	Q7Z6J9	Q8C2A2
RefSeq (mRNA)	NM_207346	NM_029557
RefSeq (protein)	NP_997229	NP_083833
Location (UCSC)	Chr 17: 75.52 – 75.52 Mb	Chr 11: 115.71 – 115.71 Mb
PubMed search
- Wikidata
View/Edit Human	View/Edit Mouse

TRNA splicing endonuclease subunit 54 is a protein that in humans is encoded by the TSEN54 gene.

== Function ==
This gene encodes a subunit of the tRNA splicing endonuclease complex, which catalyzes the removal of introns from precursor tRNAs. The complex is also implicated in pre-mRNA 3-prime end processing.

== Clinical significance ==
Mutations in this gene result in pontocerebellar hypoplasia type 2. Sepahvand et al. declared that due to the greatly overlapped phenotypes with well‐described types of PCH, e.g. PCH2, PCH4, and PCH5, "TSENopathies" term should be used which encompasses all described phenotypes of PCHs. They also reported an infratentorial chronic subdural hematoma was detected next to the Galen vein that had been developed in the line of anterior flax, supra‐ and infratentorial atrophy, hypoplasia of the pons, cerebellum and corpus callosum, delayed cerebral myelination and gray and white matter volume loss, absent folding of the olivary nucleus, and loss of transverse fibers of the pons. An extra-axial CSF space was also evident due to brain atrophy. Two novel phenotype was also reported by Sepahvand et al. as structural heart diseases including a large patent foramen ovale (>23 microbubbles), patent ductus arteriosus, and mild tricuspid and mitral valve regurgitations, and a bilaterally moderate sensorineural hearing loss.
