= Buczynski =

Name list

Buczynski (Polish: Buczyński, feminine: Buczyńska) is a surname. Notable people with the surname include:

- Eddie Buczynski (1947–1989), American Wiccan and archaeologist
- Walter Buczynski (born 1933), Canadian composer
- Wieslaw Buczynski, former Poland international rugby footballer, and coach of Malmo RC
- Michele Buczynski, actress in A Fine Romance (film)
- Agnieszka Buczyńska (born 1986), Polish politician
- Alexander Buczynski (born 1963), Croatian historian
- Helena Buczyńska (1894–1957), Polish actress
- Inga Buczyńska (born 1990), Polish rhythmic gymnast

== See also ==
- 8166 Buczynski, minor planet
