= Ignas Darkintis =

Lithuanian rugby union player (born 1989)

- Full name: Ignas Darkintis
- Born: 8 February 1989 (age 37)
- Height: 183 cm (6 ft 0 in)
- Weight: 96 kg (212 lb; 15 st 2 lb)

Rugby union career
- Position: Prop
Senior career
| Years | Team | Apps | (Points) |
| 2009-2010 | Enköpings RK | | |
| 2010-2011 | Thanet Wanderers | | |
| 2011-2012 | Birmingham & Solihull R.F.C. | 29 | (5) |
| 2012-2013 | Ordizia RE | | |
| 2013-2014 | Coventry R.F.C. | 21 | (7) |
| 2014-2015 | Ealing Trailfinders | 2 | (0) |
| 2015 | Old Albanian RFC | 4 | (0) |
| 2015- | Darlington Mowden Park | 100 | (10) |
- Correct as of 18 March 2024
International career
| Years | Team | Apps | (Points) |
| 20??- | Lithuanaia | 16 | (10) |
- Correct as of 18 March 2024

Ignas Darkintis (born 8 February 1989) is a Lithuanian rugby union player. He plays as a prop.

Darkintis played most of his career at the Lithuanian side of Vairas Siauliai. He moved to Enköping RC in Sweden, for the 2009 season, where he won a Swedish Championship. He later moved to Thanet Wanderers RUFC, in England, a team from the London 1 South, for the 2010/11 season. In the 2011/12 season he plays for Birmingham and Solihull, a team in the English National 1. He moved to Ordizia RE, in Spain, for the 2012/13 season.

He also plays for Lithuania, participating in the team that won the 2008–2010 European Nations Cup Third Division with a Grand Slam. This was part of a spell of 18 consecutive winning matches that lasted until the loss to Ukraine in the 2011 Rugby World Cup qualifyings.
