= Longball =

Longball or long ball may refer to:

- Danish longball, a bat-and-ball game
- Long ball, a soccer tactic
- Long ball, baseball jargon for a home run
