= IKSU =

Sports club in Umeå, Sweden

- IKSU logo
- Formation: 5 May 1959; 67 years ago
- Location: Umeå, Sweden
- Coordinates: 63°49′07″N 20°19′11″E (IKSU sport); 63°50′11″N 20°09′59″E (IKSU spa)
- Members: about 18,000
- Website: iksu.se

IKSU (Idrottsklubben Studenterna i Umeå) is a sports club and nonprofit organization in Umeå. It has three facilities, IKSU sport at the Umeå University campus, IKSU plus at the Arts campus and IKSU spa in Umedalen. It has about 18,000 members.

In a study conducted in 2011 by the New Zealand fitness company Les Mills International, IKSU had the second highest number of weekly visitors among 13,000 fitness centres in the world.

== History ==
The organisation was formed on 5 May 1959 as Umeå Studenters Idrottsförening (USIF). In 1960, it got its current name Idrottsklubben Studenterna i Umeå (IKSU). At that time, IKSU had its premises in Ålidhem. Its first indoor arena was opened in 1983 at the Umeå University campus, where IKSU sport lies today. It has since been expanded several times. IKSU spa was opened in Umedalen in 2003.

Brännbollscupen is an annual competition in Brännboll, organized by IKSU. The first game was held in 1974, and since 1997, the contest has World Cup status.

In 2009, the revenue was approximately SEK 87 million. IKSU had about 70 employees, 130 leaders and 18,300 active members.

The now-defunct women's floorball team IKSU innebandy played in the top-tier Swedish Super League from its inception in 1993 until 2020. In the 2004–05, 2005–06, 2007–08, 2011–12, 2016–17, 2017–18, and 2019–20 seasons, the team won a record seven championship titles.

== Facilities ==
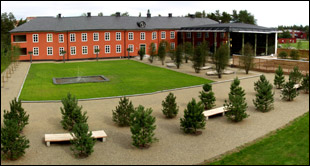
IKSU spa in Umedalen

=== IKSU sport ===
IKSU sport, previously known as IKSU sportcenter, is located at the Umeå University campus. It is the largest sports facility in Scandinavia. Its address is Petrus Laestadiusväg 15. The facility is currently over 15,000 square metres (160,000 sq ft).

=== IKSU spa ===
IKSU spa is located in Umedalen. Its address is J.A Lindersväg 53.
