= Södertälje Rugbyklubb =

- Founded: 1968
- Location: Södertälje, Sweden
- Ground(s): Brunnsängs Idrottsplats (Capacity: 1500)
- Chairman: Hans Austa
- Coach(es): Johan Hall (Head Coach); Niclas Kumlin (Senior Manager)
- League(s): Allsvenskan North
Team kit

Södertälje Rugbyklubb is a Rugby union team in Södertälje. They currently play in Allsvenskan North.

== Stadium ==
The team plays at the Brunnsängs Idrottsplats, located in the north-east of Södertälje. The stadium has a capacity of 1,500.

== Teams ==
Södertälje Rugbyklubb consists of several teams, a men's team, women's team and youth teams. The team has regular training sessions and organises youth tournaments.

== History ==
Founded on 17 December 1968, the team wears an all-black kit with red stripes on the socks.

== Records and statistics ==
The team has competed in the Allsvenskan North league since 2014. Their highest ever finish in the league was fifth place in the 2015 season. Their highest scorer in that season was Johaan Nillson, who scored 35 tries in 2015.

	Wins	Losses	Draws	Position
2014	16	21	1	12th
2015	25	11	2	5th
2016	22	12	4	6th
