= HRC Gripen =

(Sweden) HRC Gripen
- Full name: Helsingborgs Rugby Klubb Gripen
- Founded: 1968
- Location: Helsingborg, Sweden
- Ground(s): Norrvalla IP, Helsingborg
- President: Nils Arvidsson
- League: Allsvenskan
Team kit

Helsingborgs Rugby Club Gripen, also known as HRC Gripen, is a rugby union club in Sweden. Founded in 1968 in the city of Helsingborg.
