= Lugi Rugbyklubb =

Swedish rugby union club

Lunds Universitets Gymnastik och Idrottsförening Rugby football club
- Nickname: The Lions / Lionesses
- Founded: 1972
- Location: Lund, Sweden
- Ground: Centrala Idrottsplatsen (Capacity: 1000)
- Chairman: Hans Hallstadius
- Coach: (Men) Sean Rollings / Chris Howell (Women) Ross Watson / Ali Day
- League: Allsvenskan (rugby)
Team kit

Lugi Rugby football club is a rugby union club in Lund, Sweden. The club was founded in 1972 by John Nash, Perry Hadley, Giuseppe Garza and Calle Erlandsson as the rugby section of the Lunds Universitets Gymnastik och Idrottsförening (Lund University Gymnastics and Sports Club).. LUGI Lions play their home games at Centrala idrottsplatsen, where they also have their club house.

The club is known to be a very social and open rugby club, with members from all over the world active in the club.

During the late 1980s and early 1990s LUGI's u18s were among the best teams in Sweden, winning 3 Swedish championships. The seniors had their best placements in the early 1980s, placing third 1982 and second in 1984.

LUGI currently have active teams for both ladies and men in ages from u8-senior. They also have an old boys team.

== Men's ==
LUGI's men's team is currently playing in Allsvenskan (Sweden's highest division).

The team usually goes up and down between the two highest leagues.

LUGI currently have both a ladies' and men's team as well as kids and youths in all ages from u8-u18.

== Ladies ==
LUGI's ladies team, called the Lionesses, was created in 2003. They have since then been a well established team with several players being capped for Sweden in both 7s and 15s. 2025 season saw the ladies become national 7's champions, whilst progressing through the league phase in the 15s championship, they lost in the play-offs.
