= Hammarby IF Rugby =

(Sweden) Hammarby IF Rugby
- Full name: Hammarby IF RF - Rugby
- Founded: 2000
- Location: Årsta, Enskede-Årsta-Vantör, Sweden
- President: Kanogo Njuru
- Coach(es): Dustin Jinka
- League(s): Allsvenskan
Team kit

Official website
- www8.idrottonline.se/HammarbyIFRF-Rugby/

Hammarby IF Rugby is an amateur Swedish rugby union team founded in 2000, currently competing in the Allsvenskan (Top Swedish league).

In this short period, the club has produced a number of Swedish national team players in both the XV team as well as in Sevens.

Notable players include Kanogo Njuru, an outside centre, who in the year 2002 played for the Barbarians.
