= Umedalen =

- Residential area
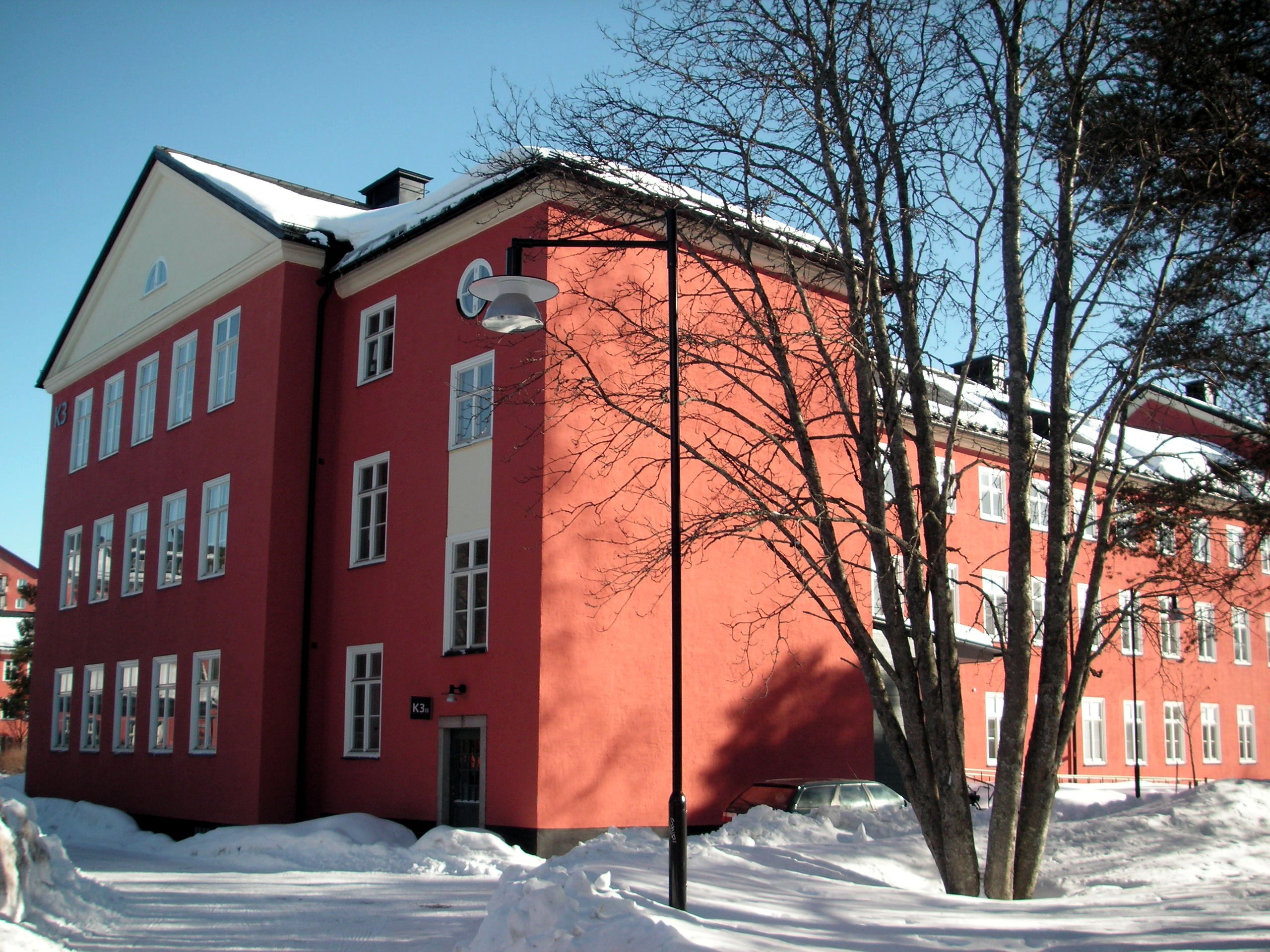
- Umedalen hospital
- Interactive map of Umedalen
- Coordinates: 63°50′15″N 20°09′58″E
- Country: Sweden
- Province: Västerbotten
- County: Västerbotten County
- Municipality: Umeå Municipality
- Time zone: UTC+1 (CET)
  - Summer (DST): UTC+2 (CEST)

Umedalen is a residential area in Umeå, Sweden, located about 5 kilometers west of the central town.

== History ==
A mental hospital was built in the area in 1934. It was closed in 1986 and the premises are now used for other activities. The residential area was built mostly between the mid-1980s and late 1990s. One of the most infamous cases of psychosurgery mishap involved the state-funded Mental Hospital of Umedalen (Sweden), which conducted many lobotomies under a three-year span resulting in 68% of patients died from post-operational complications. The acceptable rate of death around during its operative years was two percent, yet Umedalen had a mortality rate of three to seventeen percent.

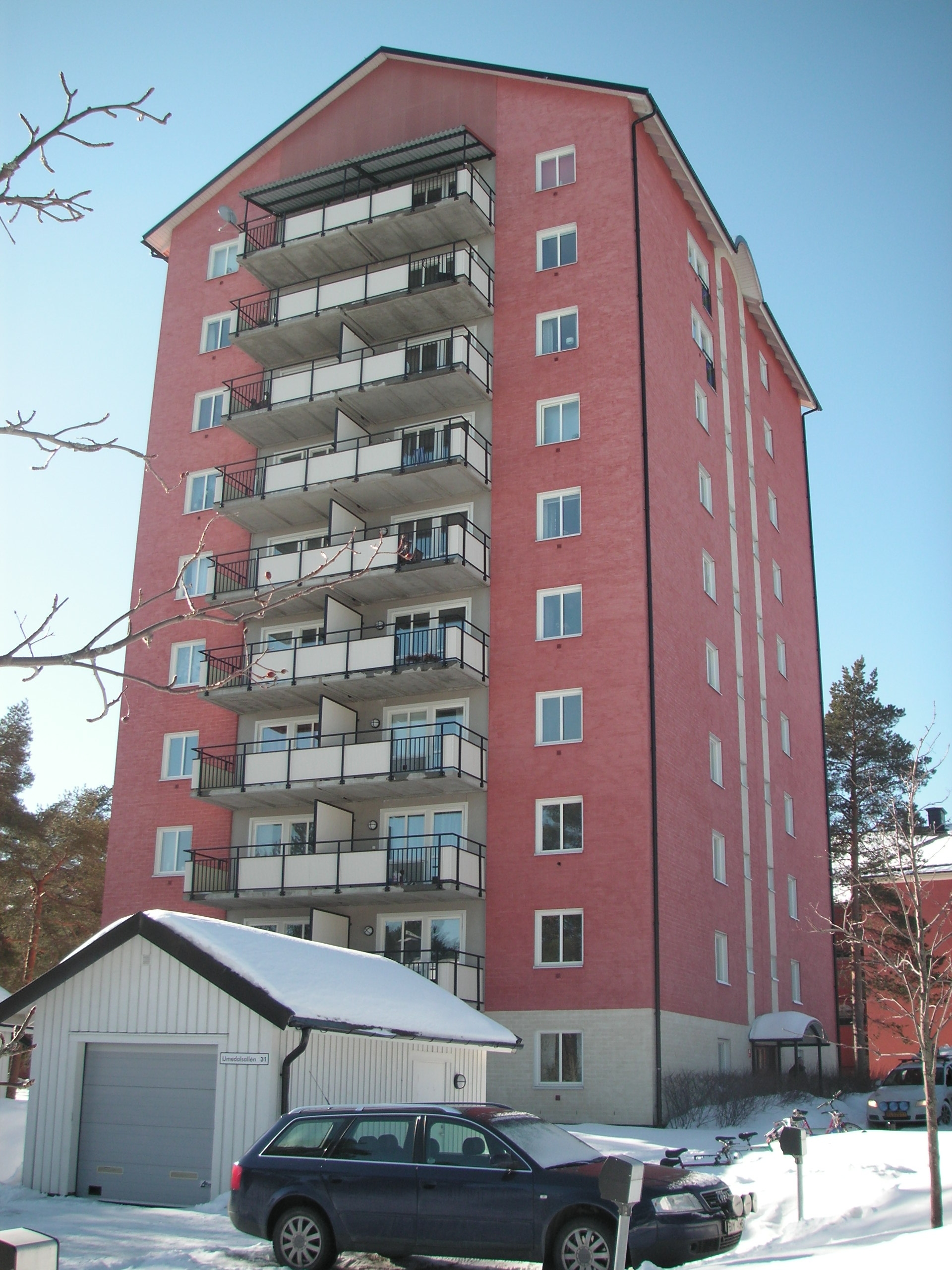
Umedalsallén 31

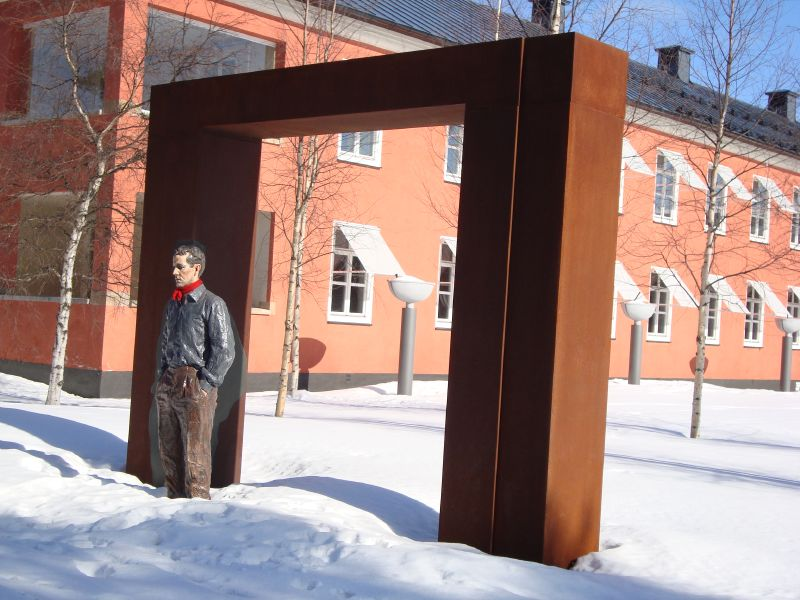
Umeå sculpture park

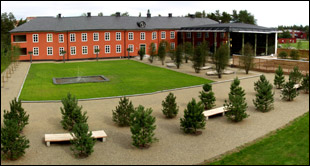
IKSU spa
