= Sandviken RC =

Sandviken Rugby Club
- Nickname(s): The Hammers
- Founded: 1983
- Location: Sandviken, Sweden
- Ground(s): Jernvallen
- League(s): Mälardalsserien
Team kit

Sandviken RC is a Swedish rugby club in Sandviken. They currently play in the Mälardalsserien along with Uppsala RFC B.

== History ==
The club was founded on 1 January 1983.
