= Enköpings RK =

(Sweden) Enköpings RK
- Full name: Enköpings Rugby Klubb
- Founded: 1968
- Location: Enköping, Sweden
- League: Allsvenskan
Team kit

Official website
- www.erk.nu

Enköpings Rugby Klubb - Also known as ERK - is situated in the town of Enköping, which has a population of approximately 40,000 people. The town is within a 40-minute drive of the major cities of Stockholm, Uppsala and Västerås.

== History ==
Enköpings RK was founded in 1968 by Dennis Pettersson, a former Malmö Rugby Club player. He established the club after moving to Enköping, which had no rugby club at the time. The club is a longstanding member of the Swedish Rugby Federation.

The Club has won numerous championships since its foundation, having been the Swedish Champions 19 times.

== Club Facilities ==
The Club has its own refurbished and extended club house, which includes a function room, and a bar and kitchen area. It also has changing rooms for both men and women, and a floodlit first team playing ground, with both seating and standing areas. There is also press facilities.

Being one of the most popular and successful clubs in Sweden has shown club-record home game attendance being just under 1,500 attendees (in the second leg game of the 2007 National Final).

It regularly hosts the Sweden national rugby team matches and competitions, and it has also become the national team’s training centre.

In May 2009 the club also hosted along with Stockholm some of the matches from the biggest ever rugby tournament to be held in Sweden, the 2009 FIRA Women's European Trophy, which doubled as a Women’s 2010 World Cup Qualification Tournament. The Swedish Ladies team (which included 2 Enköpings RK players), won their group and qualified for the 2010 Women's Rugby World Cup which was played in England, with two players from the club representing Sweden in the competition.

In May 2012 Enköping hosted the FIRA-AER Women’s European Cup "B" , where there were some Training & Education legacy programmes supported both by the Tournament staff of Enköpings RK and the Swedish Rugby Union.
