= VPS53 =

Protein-coding gene in the species Homo sapiens

Identifiers
- Aliases: VPS53, HCCS1, PCH2E, hVps53L, pp13624, GARP complex subunit, VPS53 subunit of GARP complex
- External IDs: OMIM: 615850; MGI: 1915549; GeneCards: VPS53

Gene location (Human)
Chr.	Chromosome 17 (human)
Band	17p13.3	Start	508,503 bp
Band	17p13.3	End	721,717 bp

Gene location (Mouse)
Chr.	Chromosome 11 (mouse)
Band	11|11 B5	Start	75,937,052 bp
Band	11|11 B5	End	76,070,473 bp
RNA expression pattern
Bgee	Human / Mouse (ortholog); Top expressed in: sural nerve; bone marrow cell; stromal cell of endometrium; cerebellum; cerebellar cortex; cerebellar hemisphere; corpus callosum; right hemisphere of cerebellum; right testis; left testis / Top expressed in: retinal pigment epithelium; neural layer of retina; transitional epithelium of urinary bladder; tail of embryo; genital tubercle; epithelium of stomach; facial motor nucleus; stroma of bone marrow; supraoptic nucleus; Epithelium of choroid plexus; More reference expression data
BioGPS	n/a
Gene ontology
Molecular function	protein binding
Cellular component	perinuclear region of cytoplasm; recycling endosome; EARP complex; endosome; Golgi apparatus; endosome membrane; GARP complex; membrane; trans-Golgi network; trans-Golgi network membrane; cytosol
Biological process	protein transport; endocytic recycling; lysosomal transport; retrograde transport, endosome to Golgi
Sources:Amigo / QuickGO
Orthologs
Databases	NCBI: entry; OMA: entry
Species	Human	Mouse
Entrez	55275	68299
Ensembl	ENSG00000283883; ENSG00000141252	ENSMUSG00000017288
UniProt	Q5VIR6	Q8CCB4
RefSeq (mRNA)	NM_001128159; NM_018289; NM_001366253; NM_001366254	NM_026664; NM_001364738
RefSeq (protein)	NP_001121631; NP_060759; NP_001353182; NP_001353183	NP_080940; NP_001351667
Location (UCSC)	Chr 17: 0.51 – 0.72 Mb	Chr 11: 75.94 – 76.07 Mb
PubMed search
- Wikidata
View/Edit Human	View/Edit Mouse

Vacuolar protein sorting 53 homolog (S. cerevisiae) is a protein that in humans is encoded by the VPS53 gene.

== Function ==
This gene encodes a protein with sequence similarity to the yeast Vps53p protein. Vps53p is involved in retrograde vesicle trafficking in late Golgi. [provided by RefSeq, Jul 2008].

Mutations in VPS53 cause pontocerebellar hypoplasia type 2E, PCH2E ( also known as progressive cerebello-cerebral atrophy type 2, PCCA2).
