= Gothenburg Rugby Club =

Göteborg Rugbyförening
- Founded: 2007
- Location: Gothenburg, Sweden
- Ground(s): Välen Idrottsplats
- Chairman: (Sweden) Magnus Andersson
- Coach(es): (England) Jonny Otter / (Sweden) Sara Sundström / (Wales) Charlie Keeling
- League(s): Allsvenskan South
Team kit

Göteborg RF is a Swedish rugby union team in Gothenburg, Sweden. They currently play in Allsvenskan South.

== History ==
The club was founded in 2007 by the amalgamation of Göteborg RK and Frölunda RK. A traditional Swedish non profit club based on voluntary work. The players come from all over the world.
