= TSEN2 =

Protein-coding gene in the species Homo sapiens

Identifiers
- Aliases: TSEN2, PCH2B, SEN2, SEN2L, tRNA splicing endonuclease subunit 2
- External IDs: OMIM: 608753; MGI: 2141599; GeneCards: TSEN2
Enzyme activity
EC #	BRENDA	ExPASy	KEGG	MetaCyc
4.6.1.16	↗	↗	↗	↗

Gene location (Human)
Chr.	Chromosome 3 (human)
Band	3p25.2	Start	12,484,421 bp
Band	3p25.2	End	12,541,549 bp

Gene location (Mouse)
Chr.	Chromosome 6 (mouse)
Band	6|6 E3	Start	115,521,625 bp
Band	6|6 E3	End	115,555,589 bp
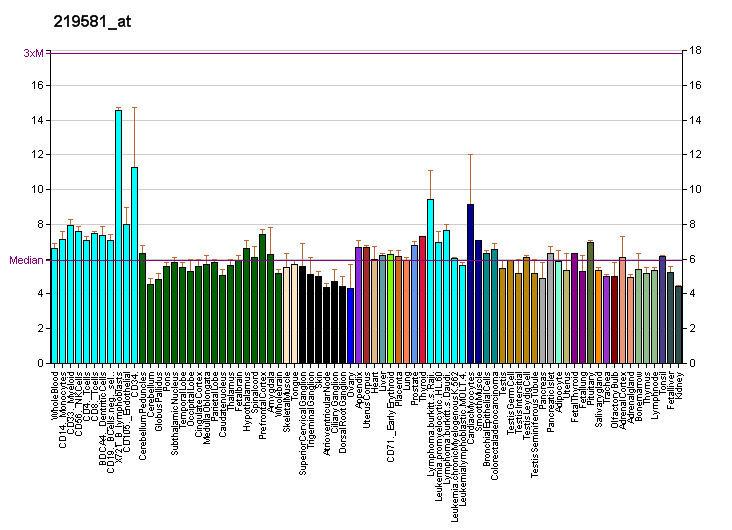
RNA expression pattern
Bgee	Human / Mouse (ortholog); Top expressed in: buccal mucosa cell; mucosa of transverse colon; gonad; ventricular zone; testicle; gastrocnemius muscle; body of pancreas; cerebellar hemisphere; right uterine tube; muscle of thigh / Top expressed in: Rostral migratory stream; yolk sac; epiblast; primitive streak; interventricular septum; hand; superior cervical ganglion; otolith organ; embryo; utricle; More reference expression data
BioGPS	More reference expression data
Gene ontology
Molecular function	tRNA-intron endonuclease activity; protein binding; lyase activity; nucleic acid binding; nuclease activity
Cellular component	centrosome; nucleolus; nucleus; tRNA-intron endonuclease complex; nucleoplasm; cytosol
Biological process	mRNA processing; tRNA-type intron splice site recognition and cleavage; RNA phosphodiester bond hydrolysis, endonucleolytic; tRNA splicing, via endonucleolytic cleavage and ligation; RNA phosphodiester bond hydrolysis; tRNA processing; nucleic acid phosphodiester bond hydrolysis
Sources:Amigo / QuickGO
Orthologs
Databases	NCBI: entry; OMA: entry
Species	Human	Mouse
Entrez	80746	381802
Ensembl	ENSG00000154743	ENSMUSG00000042389
UniProt	Q8NCE0	Q6P7W5
RefSeq (mRNA)	NM_001145392; NM_001145393; NM_001145394; NM_001145395; NM_025265 NM_001321277; NM_001321278; NM_001321279	NM_199033
RefSeq (protein)	NP_001138864; NP_001138865; NP_001138866; NP_001308206; NP_001308207 NP_001308208; NP_079541	NP_950198
Location (UCSC)	Chr 3: 12.48 – 12.54 Mb	Chr 6: 115.52 – 115.56 Mb
PubMed search
- Wikidata
View/Edit Human	View/Edit Mouse

tRNA-splicing endonuclease subunit Sen2 is an enzyme that in humans is encoded by the TSEN2 gene.

tRNA splicing is a fundamental process required for cell growth and division. SEN2 is a subunit of the tRNA splicing endonuclease, which catalyzes the removal of introns, the first step in tRNA splicing (Paushkin et al., 2004).[supplied by OMIM]

== Interactions ==
TSEN2 has been shown to interact with TSEN34 and TSEN15.
