= Brännbollscupen =

Brännboll competition in Umeå, Sweden

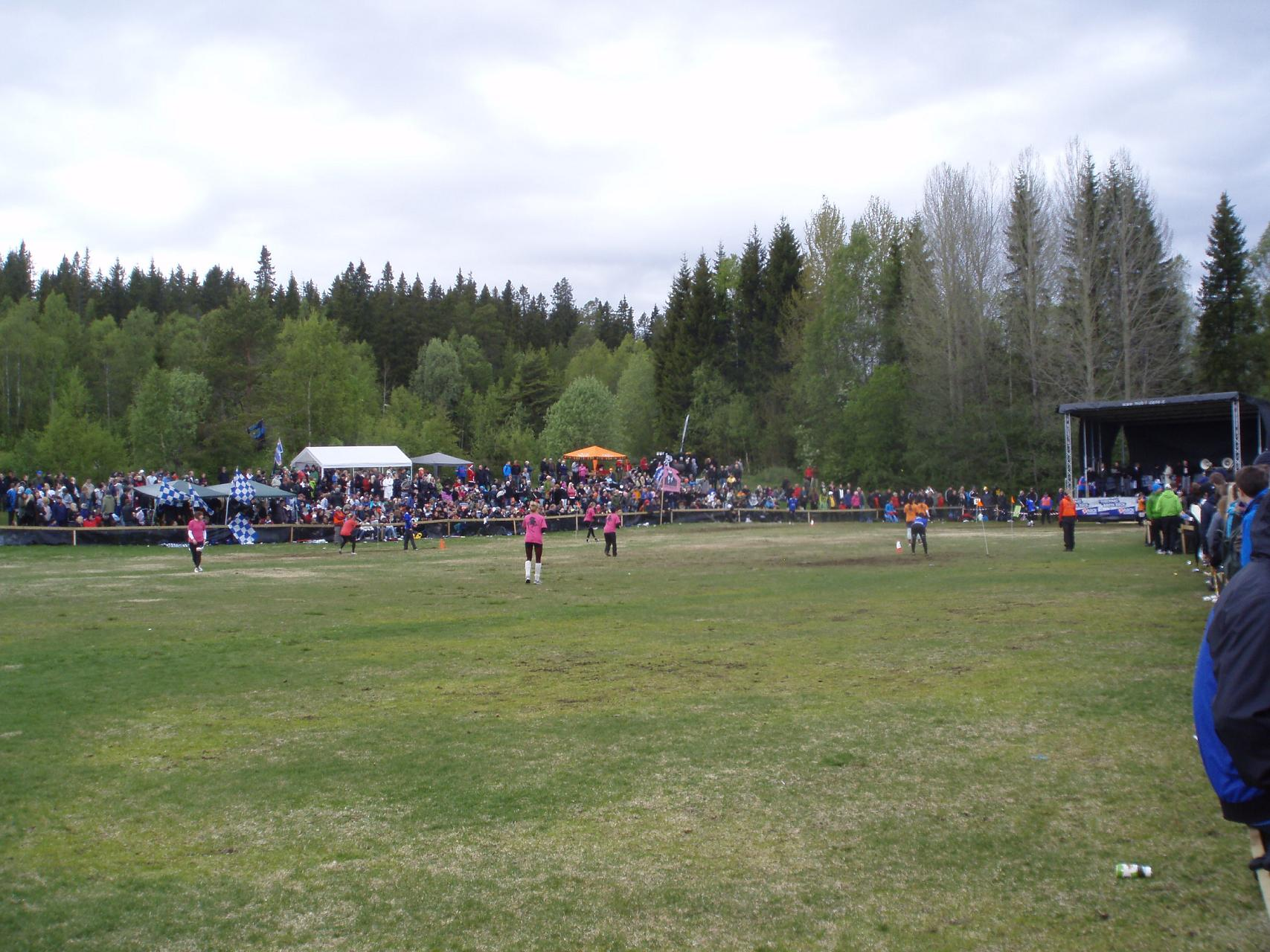
Brännbollscupen 2011

Brännbollscupen is an annual competition of brännboll in Umeå, Sweden, organised by IKSU. Brännboll is a Scandinavian game similar to baseball.

Brännbollscupen was first arranged in 1974 with 44 participating teams. Throughout the years the tournament has grown to over 1000 participating teams. Since 1997, the contest has World Cup status.

Brännbollscupen is always played the last weekend of May. When the sun sets and it is too dark to play brännboll, the festival Brännbollsyran takes place.
