= Danish longball =

Ball game

Danish longball (Danish: Langbold, Swedish: Långboll, Norwegian: Slåball) is a bat-and-ball game similar to brännboll played in Denmark, Sweden and Norway. It is also played in some British secondary schools and is also played recreationally by Scouts, the Air Training Corps, Wetheringsett Camp Suffolk (known as Nora ball), and by the Royal Navy and Australian Navy. It is also played at some U.S. summer camps.

== Play ==
Danish longball is similar to brännboll and can be described as a hybrid of baseball and cricket. Each team takes turns batting and fielding. In some areas, an element of dodgeball is incorporated, with a player being "out" if he or she is hit with the ball (outside the safety zone) below the head whilst aiming to get a run.

=== Teams and positions ===
Players are split into two teams, a batting team and a balling team. The batting team waits behind the batting goal ready to bat. The balling team is spread behind the batting goal and the safe goal ready to field.

=== Field of play ===
The batting field has two parts: Inside and outside a square (or circle). The Federation For The Standardisation Of Danish Longball states that the field of play should have a width of 50 meters and a length of 30 metres with a 20x18 metre square in the centre. Fielders can position themselves inside or outside the square. The fielder who fields the ball cannot move with it rather they must pass it to another fielder in a better position to hit the runner.

=== Equipment ===
- ball, usually a tennis ball
- bat/tennis racket
- optional safety pads

=== Rules ===
The bowler pitches the ball to the batter, who must use their bat to hit the ball. The ball must be hit within the field of play – the square. The ball must hit the ground at least once before it bounces or rolls off the field. The batter must then run to the other side of the square to a "safe zone". The runner may rest in safety, but to earn a "run" they must make it safely back to the original side of the square without getting out. Each side bats its entire line-up. The game is played until one team forfeits or reaches 50 runs.

When played in Britain it is usually an alternative to Cricket, so timed innings may be used along with a set of stumps. Typically, in Britain, a cricket ball is also used, however many Danish longball purists disagree with this idea and feel that the standard tennis ball should be used under all occasions as to preserve the sanctity of the sport.

A player is out if:

- the hit is caught by one of the fielding team
- the ball does not touch the ground of the marked area
- if the fielders hit a runner outside the safe-zones with the ball
- he/she runs outside the side lines of the square

A variant of the above is sometimes used: if a fielder hits a runner with the ball outside the safe-zones then the entire batting team is out.

== Winning the game ==
A team wins a match of Danish longball if one of the following events occurs.

1. The opposing team forfeits
2. They reach 50 runs
