= TSEN15 =

Protein-coding gene in humans

Tsen15

Identifiers
- Aliases: 5730449L18RikAL023077Sen15tRNA splicing endonuclease subunit 15
- External IDs: GeneCards:

Gene location (Human)
Chr.	Chromosome 1 (human)
Band	1|1 G2	Start	152,246,486 bp
Band	1|1 G2	End	152,262,439 bp
RNA expression pattern
Bgee	Human / Mouse (ortholog); Top expressed in: yolk sac; epiblast; embryo; ventricular zone; embryo; quadriceps femoris muscle; olfactory bulb; placenta; heart; skeletal muscle tissue / n/a; More reference expression data
BioGPS	n/a
Gene ontology
Molecular function	tRNA-intron endonuclease activity; molecular function; nucleic acid binding; nuclease activity
Cellular component	nucleolus; nucleus; cellular component
Biological process	mRNA processing; tRNA splicing, via endonucleolytic cleavage and ligation; RNA phosphodiester bond hydrolysis; RNA phosphodiester bond hydrolysis, endonucleolytic; tRNA processing; biological process; nucleic acid phosphodiester bond hydrolysis
Sources:Amigo / QuickGO
Orthologs
Databases	NCBI: entry; OMA: entry
Species	Human	Mouse
Entrez	66637	n/a
Ensembl	ENSMUSG00000014980	n/a
UniProt	Q8R3W5	Q8R3W5
RefSeq (mRNA)	NM_025677	n/a
RefSeq (protein)	NP_079953	NP_079953
Location (UCSC)	Chr 1: 152.25 – 152.26 Mb	n/a
PubMed search		n/a
- Wikidata
View/Edit Human

tRNA-splicing endonuclease subunit Sen15 is an enzyme that in humans is encoded by the TSEN15 gene.

tRNA splicing is a fundamental process for cell growth and division. SEN15 is a subunit of the tRNA splicing endonuclease, which catalyzes the removal of introns, the first step in tRNA splicing (Paushkin et al., 2004).[supplied by OMIM]

== Interactions ==
C1orf19 has been shown to interact with TSEN2.
