= Stockholm Berserkers RFC =

Stockholm Berserkers Rugby Football Club
- Nickname: Berserkers
- Founded: 2011
- Location: Stockholm, Sweden
- Ground: Gubbängsfältet Stockholm
- League(s): Allsvenskan Dam & Division 1 Herrar
Team kit

Stockholm Berserkers is a Swedish gay rugby club in Stockholm. They currently play in Allsvenskan Dam and Division 1 in Sweden, and are members of the International Gay Rugby Association and Board.

== History ==
The club was founded in 2011.
