= TOE1 =

Protein-coding gene in humans

Identifiers
- Aliases: TOE1, hCaf1z, target of EGR1, member 1 (nuclear), PCH7, target of EGR1, exonuclease, TOE-1
- External IDs: OMIM: 613931; MGI: 1915526; GeneCards: TOE1
Available structures
PDB	Ortholog search: PDBe RCSB
PDB	List of PDB id codes 2FC6

Gene location (Human)
Chr.	Chromosome 1 (human)
Band	1p34.1	Start	45,340,052 bp
Band	1p34.1	End	45,343,973 bp

Gene location (Mouse)
Chr.	Chromosome 4 (mouse)
Band	4|4 D1	Start	116,651,507 bp
Band	4|4 D1	End	116,664,837 bp
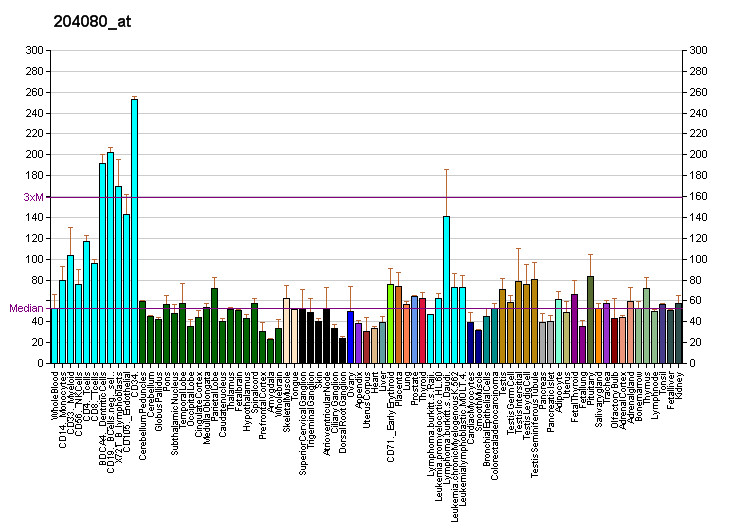
RNA expression pattern
Bgee	Human / Mouse (ortholog); Top expressed in: olfactory bulb; gonad; parotid gland; mucosa of transverse colon; right lobe of thyroid gland; left testis; granulocyte; right testis; smooth muscle tissue; rectum / Top expressed in: primitive streak; renal corpuscle; morula; blastocyst; spermatocyte; epiblast; superior cervical ganglion; medullary collecting duct; seminal vesicula; ureter; More reference expression data
BioGPS	More reference expression data
Gene ontology
Molecular function	3'-5'-exoribonuclease activity; protein binding; metal ion binding; nucleic acid binding; poly(A)-specific ribonuclease activity; snRNA binding; DNA-binding transcription factor activity, RNA polymerase II-specific
Cellular component	cytoplasm; Cajal body; nuclear speck; nucleolus; nucleoplasm; nucleus; nuclear body
Biological process	RNA phosphodiester bond hydrolysis, exonucleolytic; snRNA 3'-end processing; regulation of transcription by RNA polymerase II
Sources:Amigo / QuickGO
Orthologs
Databases	NCBI: entry; OMA: entry
Species	Human	Mouse
Entrez	114034	68276
Ensembl	ENSG00000132773	ENSMUSG00000028688
UniProt	Q96GM8	Q9D2E2
RefSeq (mRNA)	NM_025077	NM_026654
RefSeq (protein)	NP_079353	NP_080930
Location (UCSC)	Chr 1: 45.34 – 45.34 Mb	Chr 4: 116.65 – 116.66 Mb
PubMed search
- Wikidata
View/Edit Human	View/Edit Mouse

Target of EGR1 protein 1 is a protein that in humans is encoded by the TOE1 gene.
