= Karlstads Rugbyklubb =

- Nickname: The Blackwolves
- Founded: 1971
- Location: Karlstad, Sweden
- Ground: Orrholmens Idrottsplats
- Chairman: Eric O'Neill
- Coach(es): (Sweden) Torbjörn "Tobbe" Johansson(Head coach) (France) Thierry Durand (Asst coach) (Republic of Ireland) David Hanley (Asst coach)
- League: Division 2 Mälardalen
Team kit

Karlstads Rugbyklubb is a Swedish rugby club in Karlstad. They last played in Allsvenskan North in 2020.

== History ==
The club was founded in 1971. Runner up in the 1986 Allsvenskan championships remains the highest achievement for the club although they did win numerous second division titles and were runners up in the Swedish Cup in 2012 where they were narrowly beaten. For the last decade Karlstad have competed in the second tier of the Swedish rugby League system, all except 2013 season where under invitation an ageing karlstad squad took the option to compete in the highest division

== Youth ==
2015 Karlstads Rugbyklubb reopened their youth section with the intention of encouraging local girls and boys to take part in a sport that places fun and camaraderie far and above all other aspects of sport. Karlstads Rugbyklubb has a "no child left behind" policy, all players get game time, and this policy will be adapted throughout the youth section of the club in writing as the club aspires to be a club at the forefront of child welfare and development in sport.

== Season 2015 ==
Karlstad return to the West division of the second tier of Swedish rugby which will see them compete with old foes like Vänersborg RK, Oslo RK, Gothenburg RK & Spartacus RK

== Season 2016 ==
Karlstad in a rebuilding phase opted to return to a Division 2 to allow some time for development and rejuvenation of the squad. In 2016 they planned to take on teams Like Västerås, Attila, Stockholm Berserkers, Erikslund, Exiles C and Uppsala B.
