= Stockholm Exiles =

Stockholm Exiles RFC
- Full name: Stockholm Exiles Rugby Football Club
- Location: Stockholm, Sweden
- Ground(s): Årsta Sportfält (main training and playing ground) Stureby IP (ground with floodlights)
- President: Allan Mabon
- Coach: Henry van Niekerk
- League: Allsvenskan
Team kit

Stockholm Exiles Rugby Football Club is a Swedish rugby club in Stockholm.

Their "A" squad currently play in the Baltic Top League, while their B team plays in the Allsvenskan League in the Swedish rugby union.
