= Brännboll =

Scandinavian bat-and-ball game

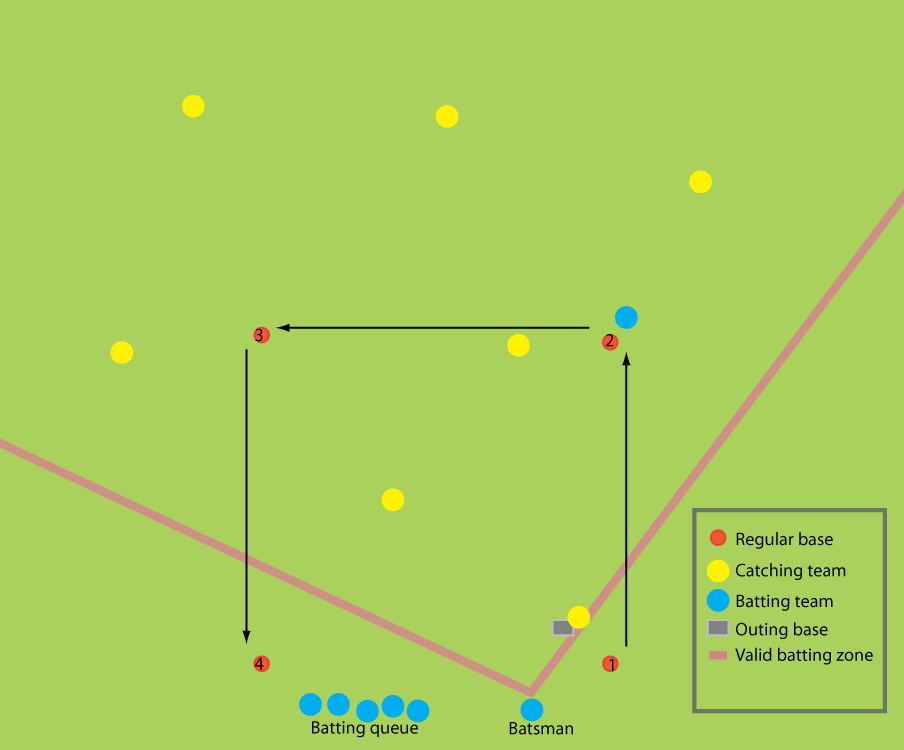
Diagram outlining brännboll as it is played in Sweden. In this diagram, a player from the batting team has reached second base and is waiting for the current batter to let them proceed to the next bases by batting.

Brännboll (Swedish pronunciation: [ˈbrɛ̂nːbɔl], Norwegian: brentball, German: Brennball, lit. 'burn-ball'), also known as rundboll (Danish: rundbold, lit. 'round-ball'), and in parts of Finland, fyramål (Finland Swedish, lit. 'four-goal'), is a bat-and-ball game similar to longball, played at amateur level throughout Sweden, as well in Finland, Norway, Denmark and Germany.

The game is mostly played on fields, sports grounds, and in public parks, but it is also part of the PE curriculum in some areas. The world championship, called Brännbollscupen, is an annual event in the Swedish city of Umeå.

== Name ==
The name brännboll (lit. 'burn-ball') is derived from the act of catching a player between two bases at the end of a batting round, referred to as "burning" them (bränna), roughly equivalent to being run out in cricket or out in baseball. The 'burn-ball' is also the German name for the game, Brennball, and in Norway, the name 'burn-ball' (Norwegian: brentball) is shared along slåball (lit. 'hit-ball') with Danish longball.

Another name is rundboll, which is also the Danish name for the game (Danish: rundbold), which refers to the act of rounding the field, i.e. a home run (frivarv/helrunda, lit. 'free lap/whole-round').

== History ==
The game has been known since the 18th century but has only recently reached the same popularity as the closely related ball game long ball.

== Rules ==
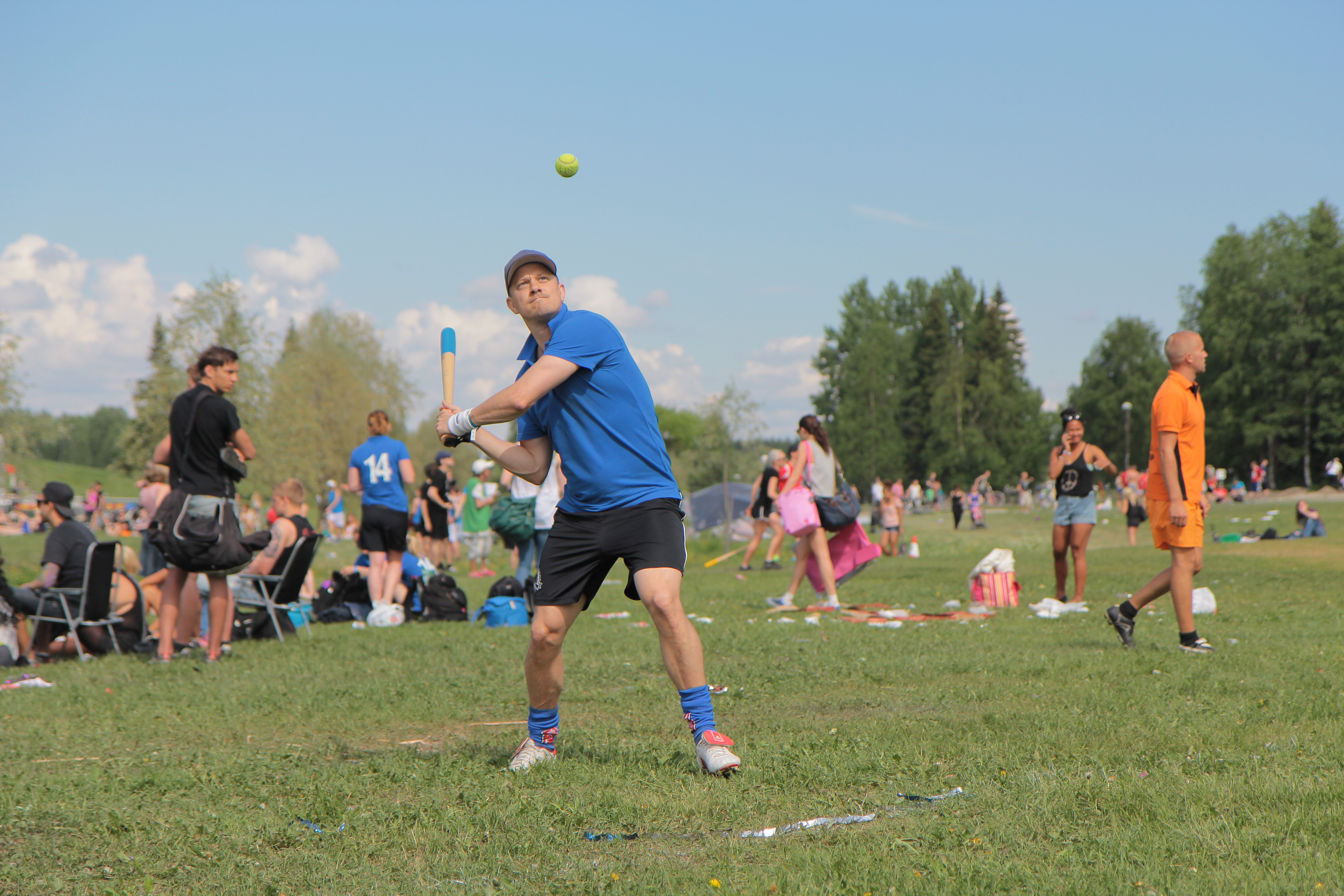
Brännboll match

The rules of brännboll differ between different areas and there is no governing body. Nevertheless, this section outlines some rules and traditions which are commonly upheld.

In contrast to baseball and cricket, there is no dedicated pitcher or bowler: but the batters themselves throw or bounce the ball (usually a tennis ball) before hitting it with their bat. A selection of bats is sometimes available, with a regular wooden or metallic baseball bat usually present, and a paddle-like bat (known as klappträ, washing paddle, tjejträ "girl bat" or kärringracket, "girl racket") resembling a cricket bat available for less experienced batters. On some occasions, there is also a stiff racket. The valid area for a successful batting is usually delimited by natural features such as trees, or simply an agreed upon imaginary border, this rule only restricts how widely the batter can hit, but not how far. The proportions of the field and positioning of the players are arbitrary, albeit usually adjusted according to the throwing and catching ability of the players, as well as team size.

When the batter successfully hits the ball, they drop the bat and make their way around the four bases (usually counter-clockwise), while the players in the catching team catch and throw the ball back to the designated catcher positioned by the outing base (brännplatta), who announces the end of the batting round with "out" (bränd, "burned") or "stop" in Denmark when the catcher has made contact with the outing base whilst holding the ball. Some local rules require the catcher to throw the ball at the ground while saying "out". If a player from the batting team is caught between two bases at the end of the batting round, they move back to either the last visited base or first base (depending on the local rules) and the catching team scores a point. If a batter is unsuccessful at batting after the three attempts allowed, they move to the first base and will run when the next batter bats a valid hit. There are no restrictions on the number of players at each base. If all players on the batting team fail to reach the fourth base (and thus rejoin the queue) and no batsmen remain in the queue, the inner team is caught out ("utebrända"), and depending on local rules extra points may be awarded to the opposing team in return for the safe passage of the players to the queue. Alternatively, the inner team gets to switch sides, as batting is often more lucrative for scoring points.

Each team get to play as both sides, usually one or two times, and sides are shifted at predetermined time intervals.

== Scoring system ==
Score and time is kept by a score keeper, who also has the final say in whether inner team players are caught out at the end of a batting round.

Generic scoring system (Due to the lack of a professional organisation governing brännboll, many local varieties exist):

- Home run (Frivarv/Helrunda) – 6 points for batting team
- Player passing fourth base (Varvning) – 1 point for batting team
- Team Caught out (Utbränd) – 5 points for catching team
- Caught out (Bränd) – 1 point for catching team
- Fly ball (catch the ball before it hits the ground) (Lyra) – 1 points for catching team
- Single-Hand fly ball - 2 points
  - In some varieties, catching the ball with one hand only (Enhandslyra) may yield more points

== Penalty system ==
Generic penalty system (Several varieties exist)

- First time – warning.
- Second time – 5 penalty points.
- Third time – 10 penalty points.
- Fourth time – disqualification, the opponent wins.

== Popularity and variations ==
While not being an organized sport with teams, a league and clearly defined rules, it is appreciated by children of all ages during school or after, and friends after work play for fun.

Since 1974 an annual Students World Championship tournament has been held in the northern city of Umeå, whereby some standardized rules are followed. The world championship is called Brännbollscupen, which is followed by the festival Brännbollsyran.

Brännboll is enjoyed by elementary schoolchildren in the American Upper Midwest (particularly Minnesota), due to the area's large Scandinavian influence.

A similar game, brennball, is popular in PE classes at German schools. It is usually played indoors, with a larger ball (such as a volleyball or a basketball) and without a bat; batting is replaced by throwing. The bases are usually far larger than in baseball and more than one player can be on the same base at the same time. German brennball is rarely played outside a PE setting.

In Norway another similar game, called dødball (deadball or deathball), is common. The game has six or five rings (approximately one meter in diameter) marked on the ground instead of four bases, limiting the number of players secured by a given ring to the amount that can fit within it. The term "dead" (død) is used instead of "burnt" or "out". When the catcher gets the ball he or she also has to bounce it on the ground (usually on a predetermined square called døboksen, "the death box") and shout "dø" ("die"). A dead player is exempt from play for the rest of the round unless a home run is achieved; in which case a set number of dead players (usually either one or all of them, depending on the rule-set) are "saved" and allowed to rejoin the queue. To complete a run a player has to reenter the "in" side of the field rather than just reaching the last base. Scoring- and win-conditions varies widely from rule-set to rule-set. Points can be determined by runs, just by home runs, by rounds won (usually determined by reaching set numbers of home runs for the in-team or dead players for the out-team) or by combinations of the above. Sometimes points are not used at all and a game ends with no formal winner after a set amount of time.

Another version of the game, popular among students, is called ölbrännboll (beer-brännball), where beercases are used as bases so the players of the batting team, waiting to run can drink freely. It is however not mandatory to drink while waiting. One version of the game where drinking is mandatory is vinbrännboll (wine-brännball), where you take a glass of wine after passing the fourth base and thus being "safe".

== See also ==
- Thèque or tèque, Norman baseball
- Danish longball
- Rounders
