= TSEN34 =

Protein-coding gene in the species Homo sapiens

Identifiers
- Aliases: TSEN34, LENG5, PCH2C, SEN34, SEN34L, tRNA splicing endonuclease subunit 34
- External IDs: OMIM: 608754; MGI: 1913328; GeneCards: TSEN34
Enzyme activity
EC #	BRENDA	ExPASy	KEGG	MetaCyc
4.6.1.16	↗	↗	↗	↗

Gene location (Human)
Chr.	Chromosome 19 (human)
Band	19q13.42	Start	54,189,938 bp
Band	19q13.42	End	54,194,536 bp

Gene location (Mouse)
Chr.	Chromosome 7 (mouse)
Band	7|7 A1	Start	3,695,862 bp
Band	7|7 A1	End	3,704,023 bp
RNA expression pattern
Bgee	Human / Mouse (ortholog); Top expressed in: blood; right adrenal gland; right adrenal cortex; left adrenal gland; left adrenal cortex; gonad; mucosa of transverse colon; right ovary; right uterine tube; left ovary / Top expressed in: mesencephalon; neural tube; yolk sac; epiblast; placenta; rhombencephalon; ventricular zone; stomach; lip; heart; More reference expression data
BioGPS	n/a
Gene ontology
Molecular function	tRNA-intron endonuclease activity; lyase activity; nucleic acid binding; nuclease activity
Cellular component	nucleolus; nucleus; tRNA-intron endonuclease complex; nucleoplasm
Biological process	mRNA processing; tRNA-type intron splice site recognition and cleavage; RNA phosphodiester bond hydrolysis, endonucleolytic; tRNA splicing, via endonucleolytic cleavage and ligation; RNA phosphodiester bond hydrolysis; tRNA processing; nucleic acid phosphodiester bond hydrolysis
Sources:Amigo / QuickGO
Orthologs
Databases	NCBI: entry; OMA: entry
Species	Human	Mouse
Entrez	79042	66078
Ensembl	ENSG00000278622; ENSG00000274129; ENSG00000274796; ENSG00000278712; ENSG00000275165 ENSG00000278605; ENSG00000273896; ENSG00000274078; ENSG00000274672; ENSG00000170892	ENSMUSG00000035585
UniProt	Q9BSV6	Q8BMZ5
RefSeq (mRNA)	NM_001077446; NM_001282332; NM_001282333; NM_024075; NM_001386740	NM_001164204; NM_001164205; NM_024168
RefSeq (protein)	NP_001070914; NP_001269261; NP_001269262; NP_076980	NP_001157676; NP_001157677; NP_077130
Location (UCSC)	Chr 19: 54.19 – 54.19 Mb	Chr 7: 3.7 – 3.7 Mb
PubMed search
- Wikidata
View/Edit Human	View/Edit Mouse

tRNA-splicing endonuclease subunit Sen34 is an enzyme that in humans is encoded by the TSEN34 gene.

tRNA splicing is a fundamental process required for cell growth and division. SEN34 is a subunit of the tRNA splicing endonuclease, which catalyzes the removal of introns, the first step in tRNA splicing (Paushkin et al., 2004).[supplied by OMIM]

== Interactions ==
TSEN34 has been shown to interact with TSEN2.
