= NRK Troján =

- Founded: 1956
- Location: Norrköping, Sweden
- Ground(s): Himmelstalund Sportfält
- League(s): Mälardalsserien
Team kit

NRK Troján is a Swedish rugby club in Norrköping. They currently play in Mälardalsserien with Linköpings Rugbyklubb.

== History ==
The club was founded in 1956. Their first match was against now-defunct Stockholm side Vikingarna, which they won 9–8.
