= LAGLIDADG RNA motifs =

LAGLIDADG-2
- Consensus secondary structure and sequence conservation of LAGLIDADG-2 RNA

Identifiers
- Symbol: LAGLIDADG-2
- Rfam: RF03094

Other data
- RNA type: Gene; sRNA
- SO: SO:0001263
- PDB structures: PDBe

LAGLIDADG RNA motifs are conserved RNA structures that were discovered by bioinformatics. These RNA motifs are associated with genes that encode endonucleases of the LAGLIDADG variety. Although group I introns are often present in self-replicating elements that use LAGLIDADG endonucleases, the known LAGLIDADG RNA motifs appear too small and structurally simple to function as a self-splicing intron.

A LAGLIDADG-1 motif RNA is predicted in the fungus Trametes cingulata as well as many metagenomic sequences, which presumably are derived from other fungi. LAGLIDADG-2 motif RNAs are found in Halobacteria. It is ambiguous whether LAGLIDADG-1 RNAs function as cis-regulatory elements or whether they operate in trans.
