= Malmö RC =

(Sweden) Malmö RC
- Full name: Malmö Rugby Club
- Founded: 1954
- Location: Malmö, Sweden
- League: Allsvenskan

Malmö Rugby Club is a rugby union club from Malmö, founded on 7 October 1954.

The club has amongst their silverware 6 national championships. The first one obtained in 1959. They have also managed to win junior championships 11 times.

The club played their home games at Lindängens IP, place in where they previously had their clubhouse. Nowadays the club premises are located in Limhamnsfältet.
