= VRK Tigrarna =

- Founded: 18 April 1948
- Location: Västerås, Sweden
- League(s): Mälardalsserien
Team kit

Västerås Rugbyklubb Tigrarna, commonly known as Tigrarna (lit. 'the Tigers') or VRK Tigrarna, are a rugby union team in Västerås, Sweden. They play in Mälardalsserien, the second level of rugby in Sweden.

== History ==
Västerås Rugbyklubb were founded on 18 April 1948 on initiative by Karl Wolgert Nilsson after he had learnt to play in the United States. They immediately advanced to the Swedish Championship final, which they lost. November the following year, 1949, they managed to qualify again and won to IK Göta, 10–0.

The club later disbanded in 1955 but restarted in the 1970s, then attracting former Harlequins F.C. player Tim Rutter who was working in Västerås. They again restarted in 2010 after 20 years hiatus.
