= VRK1 =

Protein-coding gene in the species Homo sapiens

Identifiers
- Aliases: VRK1, PCH1, PCH1A, vaccinia related kinase 1, VRK serine/threonine kinase 1
- External IDs: OMIM: 602168; MGI: 1261847; GeneCards: VRK1
Available structures
PDB	Ortholog search: PDBe RCSB
PDB	List of PDB id codes 2KTY, 2KUL, 2LAV, 2RSV, 3OP5
Enzyme activity
EC #	BRENDA	ExPASy	KEGG	MetaCyc
2.7.11.1	↗	↗	↗	↗

Gene location (Human)
Chr.	Chromosome 14 (human)
Band	14q32.2	Start	96,797,304 bp
Band	14q32.2	End	96,954,846 bp

Gene location (Mouse)
Chr.	Chromosome 12 (mouse)
Band	12|12 E-F1	Start	106,010,228 bp
Band	12|12 E-F1	End	106,077,426 bp
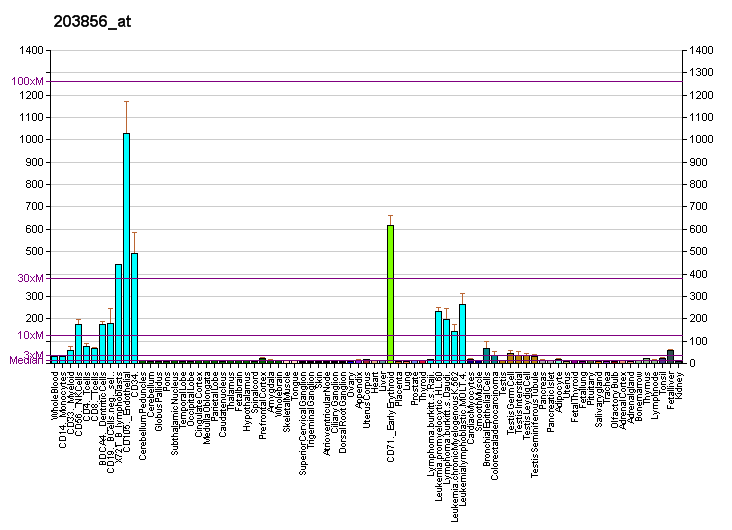
RNA expression pattern
Bgee	Human / Mouse (ortholog); Top expressed in: oocyte; bone marrow; secondary oocyte; ganglionic eminence; left testis; ventricular zone; right testis; trabecular bone; testicle; gonad / Top expressed in: granulocyte; tail of embryo; genital tubercle; ganglionic eminence; epiblast; primitive streak; ventricular zone; abdominal wall; embryo; secondary oocyte; More reference expression data
BioGPS	More reference expression data
Gene ontology
Molecular function	transferase activity; nucleotide binding; protein kinase activity; kinase activity; protein serine/threonine kinase activity; protein binding; histone kinase activity (H3-T3 specific); histone kinase activity (H3-S10 specific); ATP binding; protein kinase binding
Cellular component	spindle; nucleoplasm; nucleolus; Golgi stack; cytoskeleton; nucleus; cytoplasm; cytosol
Biological process	phosphorylation; cell division; protein phosphorylation; mitotic nuclear membrane disassembly; cell cycle; mitotic nuclear membrane reassembly; Golgi disassembly; regulation of cell shape; protein autophosphorylation; peptidyl-serine phosphorylation; peptidyl-threonine phosphorylation
Sources:Amigo / QuickGO
Orthologs
Databases	NCBI: entry; OMA: entry
Species	Human	Mouse
Entrez	7443	22367
Ensembl	ENSG00000100749	ENSMUSG00000021115
UniProt	Q99986	Q80X41
RefSeq (mRNA)	NM_003384	NM_001029843; NM_001029844; NM_011705; NM_001364365; NM_001364367 NM_001364368
RefSeq (protein)	NP_003375	NP_001025014; NP_001025015; NP_035835; NP_001351294; NP_001351296 NP_001351297
Location (UCSC)	Chr 14: 96.8 – 96.95 Mb	Chr 12: 106.01 – 106.08 Mb
PubMed search
- Wikidata
View/Edit Human	View/Edit Mouse

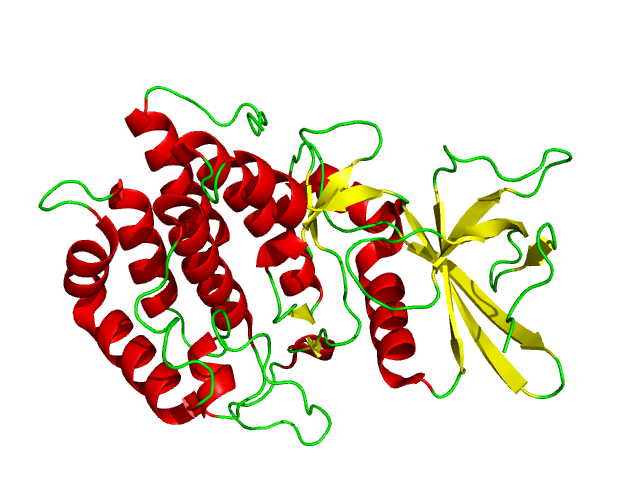
Cartoon diagram of the Human vaccinia-related kinase protein PDB entry 6bru

Serine/threonine-protein kinase VRK1 is an enzyme that in humans is encoded by the VRK1 gene.

This gene encodes a member of the vaccinia-related kinase (VRK) family of serine/threonine protein kinases. This gene is widely expressed in human tissues and has increased expression in actively dividing cells, such as those in testis, thymus, fetal liver, and carcinomas. Its protein localizes to the nucleus and has been shown to promote the stability and nuclear accumulation of a transcriptionally active p53 molecule and, in vitro, to phosphorylate Thr18 of p53 and reduce p53 ubiquitination. This gene, therefore, may regulate cell proliferation. This protein also phosphorylates histone, casein, and the transcription factors ATF2 (activating transcription factor 2) and C-jun.
