= Spartacus Rugby Club =

Rugby club in Gothenburg, Sweden

Spartacus Rugby
- Full name: Spartacus Rugby Union Football Club
- Sport: Rugby Union
- Founded: 1968
- League: Allsvenskan
- Home ground: Partille (capacity: 1000)
- Anthem: "Spartacus, Superstars"
- President: Emanuel Gustavsson
- Head coach: Jonas Ahl
- Captain: James Halpin
- Motto: "Victory or Valhalla"

Strip
- Red-and-white hooped Jersey, white shorts, red socks

Spartacus Rugby Union Football Club, is a Rugby Union team in Gothenburg, Sweden, playing in the top Swedish League.

== History ==
Spartacus Rugby Union Football Club was founded in 1968. At the helm were Göran Olsson, John Phelan and Willard Sartre. Then, Spartacus only had a senior men's team. It is the same today, but in recent years they also have had success in ladies and youth teams.

Spartacus Rugby Club has undergone periods of generational transition at senior level, with many players progressing through the club's youth academy. The senior squad has also included international players from countries such as England, Ireland, France, New Zealand, and Fiji. In early 2006, the club appointed Jonas Ahl as head coach; at the time, he also served as coach of the Swedish women's national rugby team. Under his leadership, Spartacus earned promotion to the Allsvenskan, the highest division in Swedish rugby.

== Colours and Jumper ==
Spartacus wear a red and white hooped jersey (same as the Japanese National Team).

== Sources ==
- http://www.spartacusrugby.se
