= Uppsala RFC =

Uppsala Rugby Football Club
- Nickname: Plebs
- Founded: 1965
- Location: Uppsala, Sweden
- Ground: Fyrisfjädern
- Chairman: Henrik VIberg
- Coach(es): Men's:Henrik Viberg & Anders Göransson; Women's: Hannah Molin
- Captain: Luca Illing
- League: Norra Allsvenskan
Team kit

Uppsala RFC is a Swedish rugby club in Uppsala. The club was founded in 1965 and were national champions in 1969, 1970 and 1977. The women's team were national runners-up in 2005, 2007, 2009 and 2011.
