= Swedish Rugby Union =

Governing body for rugby union in Sweden

Svenska Rugbyförbundet
- Sport: Rugby union
- Founded: 29 May 1932; 93 years ago
- World Rugby affiliation: 1988
- Rugby Europe affiliation: 1958
- President: Daniel Sörensson
- Website: www.rugby.se

The Swedish Rugby Union (Swedish: Svenska Rugbyförbundet) is the governing body for rugby union in Sweden. The Stockholm Rugby Union (Swedish: Stockholms Rugbyförbund) was founded on 29 May 1932. It is unclear exactly when it became the "Swedish Rugby Union", but it is supposed to have occurred sometime between 1932 and 1936. It became affiliated to the International Rugby Board in 1988.

== See also ==
- Sweden national rugby union team
- Rugby union in Sweden
