= Lars Winnerbäck discography =

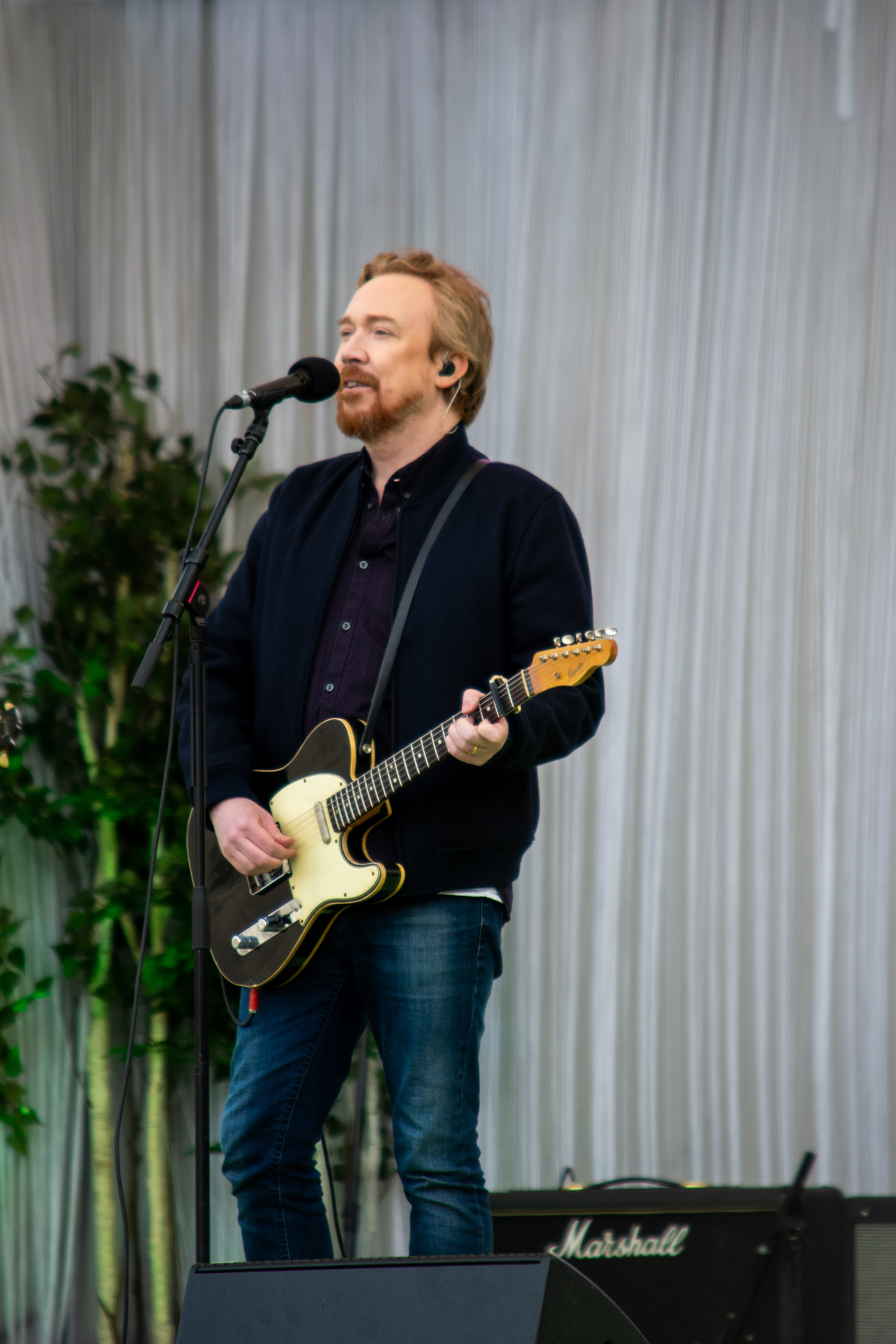
- Winnerbäck performing in 2018
- Studio albums: 15
- Extended plays: 5
- Live albums: 6
- Compilation albums: 2
- Singles: 19
- Music videos: 4

This is the discography documenting albums released by Lars Winnerbäck.

== Albums ==
=== Studio albums ===
Year	Title	Chart positions		Sales and certifications
Year	Title	SWE	NOR	Sales and certifications
1996	Dans med svåra steg: 1st studio album; Released: 1996	—	—	
1997	Rusningstrafik: 2nd studio album; Released: 5 September 1997	58	—	
1998	Med solen i ögonen: 3rd studio album; Released: 1 October 1998	30	—	
1999	Kom: 4th studio album; Released: 30 September 1999	11	—	
2001	Singel: 5th studio album; Released: 15 March 2001	1	—	
2003	Söndermarken: 6th studio album; Credited to Lars Winnerbäck and Hovet; Released: 13 March 2003	1	—	
2004	Vatten under broarna: 7th studio album; Released: 8 October 2004	1	—	
2007	Daugava: 8th studio album; Released: 4 October 2007	1	34	
2009	Tänk om jag ångrar mig och sen ångrar mig igen: 9th studio album; Released: 2009	1	6	
2013	Hosianna: 10th studio album; Released: 2013	1	3	
2016	Granit och morän: 11th studio album; Released: 17 June 2016	1	7	
2019	Eldtuppen: 12th studio album; Released: 27 September 2019	1	10	
2022	Själ och hjärta: 13th studio album; Released: 29 April 2022	4	—	
2023	Neutronstjärnan: 14th studio album; Released: 22 September 2023	1	38	
2026	Längtan till våren: 15th studio album; Released: 25 September 2026	1	77	
"—" denotes the album failed to chart or not released

=== Live albums ===
Year	Title	Chart positions		Sales and certifications
Year	Title	SWE	NOR	Sales and certifications
1999	Bland skurkar, helgon och vanligt folk: 1st live album; Released: 1999	—	—	
2001	...Live för dig!: 2nd live album; Released: 2 November 2001	21	—	
2005	Stackars hela Sverige: Bränt krut vol. 1: 3rd live album; Released: 2005	—	—	
2008	Vi var där blixten hittade ner - Bränt krut vol. 3: 4th live album; Released: 31 July 2008	1	—	
2017	Vi var där: Released: 9 June 2017	—	—	
2020	Lars Winnerbäck Globen (Live, 2019.11.29): Released: 17 April 2020	—	—	
"—" denotes the album failed to chart or not released

=== Compilation albums ===
Year	Title	Chart positions		Sales and certifications
Year	Title	SWE	NOR	Sales and certifications
2006	Efter nattens bränder (1996–2006): Released: 30 March 2006	1	—	
2009	Over Grensen – De Beste 1996–2009: Released: 2 November 2009	—	3	
"—" denotes the album failed to chart or not released

== Extended plays ==
- Bränt krut vol. 2 (2005)
- Själ och hjärta, del 1 (2021)

== Singles ==
Year	Title	Chart positions	Certifications	Album
Year	Title	SWE	Certifications	Album
1999	"Kom ihåg mig"	40		Kom
2001	"Jag vill gå hem med dig"	27		Singel
2003	"Åt samma håll" (with Hovet)	6		Hovet
2003	"Dunkla rum" (with Hovet)	9		Hovet
2003	"Hum hum från Humlegården" (with Hovet)	4		Hovet
2004	"Elegi"	1		Söndermarken
2005	"Stackars"	4		Stackars hela Sverige: Bränt krut vol. 1
2005	"Stort liv" (with Hovet)	1		
2007	"Om du lämnade mig nu" (in a duet with Miss Li)	1		Daugava
2008	"En tätort på en slätt"	30		Daugava
2008	"Som jag hade dig förut" (with Melissa Horn)	58		
2008	"Strimmor"	2		
2009	"Jag får liksom ingen ordning"	1		Tänk om jag ångrar mig, och sen ångrar mig igen
2010	"Från kylan in i värmen"	4		
2010	"En stannfågel ger sig av"	24		
2013	"Utkast till ett brev"	60		Hosianna
2013	"Vi åkte aldrig ut till havet"	48		Hosianna
2013	"Gå med mig vart jag går"	55		Hosianna
2013	"Hosianna"	58		Hosianna
2015	"Köpt en bil"	29		Granit och morän
2016	"Granit och morän"	49		Granit och morän
2017	"Småstadsprat" (with Per Gessle)	72		
2019	"Tror jag hittar hem"	27		Eldtuppen
2021	"Själ och hjärta"	51		Själ och hjärta, del 1
2021	"Decembernatt"	— (Note: "Decembernatt" did not enter the Swedish Singellista Chart, but peaked at number three on the Swedish Heatseeker Chart.)		Själ och hjärta, del 1
2021	"Älvens industrier"	63		Själ och hjärta, del 1
2021	"Skriet"	83		Själ och hjärta, del 1
2021	"Grand Hotel"	— (Note: "Grand Hotel" did not enter the Swedish Singellista Chart, but peaked at number six on the Swedish Heatseeker Chart.)		Själ och hjärta, del 2
2021	"Nånting, kanske stjärnorna"	— (Note: "Nånting, kanske stjärnorna" did not enter the Swedish Singellista Chart, but peaked at number three on the Swedish Heatseeker Chart.)		Själ och hjärta, del 2
2021	"Kallt regn som faller"	—		Själ och hjärta, del 2
2021	"Jag väntar här"	— (Note: "Jag väntar här" did not enter the Swedish Singellista Chart, but peaked at number 13 on the Swedish Heatseeker Chart.)		Själ och hjärta, del 2
2021	"Jag har en sång"	—		Non-album single
2022	"Släpp det där mörkret"	— (Note: "Släpp det där mörkret" did not enter the Swedish Singellista Chart, but peaked at number three on the Swedish Heatseeker Chart.)		Själ och hjärta
2023	"Nåt som verkligen är bra"	46		Neutronstjärnan
2023	"Är det nåt jag ska ta med"	62		Neutronstjärnan
2024	"Känns så längesen" (with Johnossi)	65		Non-album single
2026	"Hälsningar"	43		Längtan till våren
2026	"Mirakel"	88		Längtan till våren
2026	"50 år i västerås"	28		Längtan till våren

== Other charted songs ==
Year	Title	Chart positions	Album
Year	Title	SWE	Album
2016	"Sysselmannen"	89	Granit och morän
2016	"Kommer och går"	95	Granit och morän
2016	"Lågsäsong"	99	Granit och morän
2016	"Möt mig på stationen"	— (Note: "Möt mig på stationen" did not enter the Swedish Singles Chart, but peaked at number two on the Swedish Heatseeker chart.)	Granit och morän
2016	"Blues of a Salesman"	— (Note: "Blues of a Salesman" did not enter the Swedish Singles Chart, but peaked at number four on the Swedish Heatseeker chart.)	Granit och morän
2016	"Visst har vi glömt"	— (Note: "Visst har vi glömt" did not enter the Swedish Singles Chart, but peaked at number seven on the Swedish Heatseeker chart.)	Granit och morän
2016	"Khom loy"	— (Note: "Khom loy" did not enter the Swedish Singles Chart, but peaked at number eight on the Swedish Heatseeker chart.)	Granit och morän
2016	"En vän i solen"	— (Note: "En vän i solen" did not enter the Swedish Singles Chart, but peaked at number ten on the Swedish Heatseeker chart.)	Granit och morän
2019	"Eldtuppen"	55	Eldtuppen
2019	"Paradiset"	64	Eldtuppen
2019	"Hur och vem och vad"	66	Eldtuppen
2019	"Skulle aldrig hända oss"	74	Eldtuppen
2019	"Hymn"	78	Eldtuppen
2019	"När jag såg dig"	92	Eldtuppen
2019	"Vykort från alperna"	— (Note: "Vykort från alperna" did not enter the Swedish Singellista Chart, but peaked at number one on the Swedish Heatseeker Chart.)	Eldtuppen
2019	"Stockholm i okt"	— (Note: "Stockholm i okt" did not enter the Swedish Singellista Chart, but peaked at number two on the Swedish Heatseeker Chart.)	Eldtuppen
2019	"Död och himmel"	— (Note: "Död och himmel" did not enter the Swedish Singellista Chart, but peaked at number five on the Swedish Heatseeker Chart.)	Eldtuppen
2019	"Precis det där"	— (Note: "Precis det där" did not enter the Swedish Singellista Chart, but peaked at number six on the Swedish Heatseeker Chart.)	Eldtuppen
2023	"Min gata i stan"	32	Neutronstjärnan
2023	"Alltid nästan där"	46	Neutronstjärnan
2023	"En lampa i mässing"	50	Neutronstjärnan
2023	"Vad gör det om hundra år"	53	Neutronstjärnan
2023	"Rosor & champagne"	21	Neutronstjärnan
2023	"Gärna lite till"	66	Neutronstjärnan
2023	"Neutronstjärnan"	75	Neutronstjärnan
2023	"Vår tid"	63	Neutronstjärnan
2026	"Dagen"	38	Längtan till våren
2026	"Tills vi gnistrar igen"	51	Längtan till våren
2026	"Nordsjælland"	74	Längtan till våren
2026	"Kring Katarina k:a"	63	Längtan till våren
2026	"Där tågen rullar in"	21	Längtan till våren
2026	"Trettio dagar har april"	— (Note: "Trettio dagar har april" did not enter the Swedish Singellista Chart, but peaked at number one on the Swedish Heatseeker Chart.)	Längtan till våren
2026	"Livet går långsamt, tiden går fort"	— (Note: "Livet går långsamt, tiden går fort" did not enter the Swedish Singellista Chart, but peaked at number two on the Swedish Heatseeker Chart.)	Längtan till våren
