= Hovet (band) =

- Genres: Rock, progg, pop
- Years active: 2003 to present
- Labels: Hovet Records, Sonet, Universal
- Members: Staffan Andersson; Jens Back; Norpan Eriksson; Johan Persson; Idde Schultz; Anna Stadling; Josef Zackrisson

Hovet is most known to be the backup band to Swedish singer/songwriter Lars Winnerbäck.

== History ==
The band was composed of musicians that Winnerbäck had worked with through the years and was officially formed in 2003. The band toured with Winnerbäck during 2001 when he recorded his first live record ...Live för dig! and recorded Söndermarken with Winnerbäck in Denmark. When Lars announced to the band that he was planning to record the acoustic album Vatten under broarna Hovet decided to record an album on their own.

The band moved out to a rented house in Kisa during the winter of 2004 and divided themselves in teams to write music. The band soon had thirteen songs which they brought to Stockholm to record. All of the songs were recorded live with the entire band playing together with very few overdubs. All of the bandmembers then divided the vocals between them, the whole album took five days to record. The records artwork was done by Winnerbäck and the record was released on their own label Hovet Records.

Hovet later joined up to record the Ep Stort liv and later recorded two new songs for Winnerbäcks dubbel disc compilation album Efter nattens bränder as well as tour in support of both records. In 2007 Winnerbäck announced that he was going to record his next album Daugava without Hovet, the only member to participate during the recording was Johan Persson. Winnerbäck claimed that he had to work with new musicians in order not to repeat himself and that he would like to work again with Hovet sometime in the future. Vocalist Idde Schultz also confirmed that it wasn't a permanent break up and that there was no hard feelings between Hovet and Winnerbäck.

== Members ==
- Staffan Andersson - Guitar, mandolin, vocals
- Jens Back - Keyboard, piano, saxophone
- Norpan Eriksson - Drums, percussion, vocals
- Johan Persson - Guitar, bass guitar, keyboard, harmonica, accordion
- Idde Schultz - Acoustic guitars, vocals
- Anna Stadling - Acoustic guitar, vocals
- Josef Zackrisson - Bassguitar, vocals

== Discography ==
(for Lars Winnerbäck, see his discography page)

=== Albums ===
Year	Album	Peak positions	Certification
Year	Album	SWE	Certification
2003	Söndermarken (credited to Lars Winnerbäck och Hovet)	1	
2003	Hovet (credited to Hovet)	14	

=== Singles ===
Year	Album	Peak positions	Certification
Year	Album	SWE	Certification
2003	"Åt samma håll" (credited to Lars Winnerbäck och Hovet)	6	
2003	"Dunkla rum" (credited to Lars Winnerbäck och Hovet)	9	
2003	"Hum hum från Humlegården" (credited to Lars Winnerbäck och Hovet)	4	
2004	"Silverfisken" (credited to Hovet)	7	
2005	"Stort liv" (credited to Lars Winnerbäck och Hovet)	1	

=== DVDs ===
- Lars Winnerbäck – Live i Linköping DVD (200)
