= Hovet (disambiguation) =

Hovet is an arena located in the Johanneshov district of Stockholm.

Hovet may also refer to:

== Places ==
=== Norway ===
- Hovet, Agder, a village in the municipality of Valle in Agder county
- Hovet, Buskerud, a mountain village in the municipality of Hol in Buskerud county
- Hovet Church, a church in the municipality of Hol in Buskerud county

== Other ==
- Hovet (band), the backup band to Swedish singer/songwriter Lars Winnerbäck
- Hovet (album), the self-titled debut album from Lars Winnerbäck's backup band Hovet
- M163, which was called Hovet by Israel
