= You Had Time =

Song by Ani DiFranco

from the album Out of Range
- Released: 1994
- Genre: Indie rock; folk
- Length: 5:49
- Songwriter: Ani DiFranco

"You Had Time" is a song written and recorded by American songwriter Ani DiFranco from her 1994 album Out of Range. The song, one of her more critically lauded from the album, describes the complicated emotions associated with the breakup of a long-term relationship. DiFranco describes this song as one in which she felt freedom in recording, "becoming herself", and learning how to "document [her] songs" in the studio.

The album recording begins with an acoustic piano solo of more than two minutes. Writer and occasional music journalist Nick Hornby featured the song in his work 31 Songs (also known as Songbook), in which he discussed his thoughts on a number of his favourite songs. He attributes the two-minute solo to a depiction of the creative process behind the song. Hornby also suggests that "You Had Time" is an example of a song that, while it may not read as poetry on paper, nevertheless makes for a beautiful song.

The song was used in the 2001 Canadian film Lost and Delirious, as the backdrop to a montage of one of the protagonists' reactions to grief at the breakup of a serious relationship.

Swedish musician Lars Winnerbäck has recorded a version of the song. Translated into Swedish, the song is called "Du hade tid", and can be found on Winnerbäck's 2001 album Singel.
