= Hjulsbro =

City district in Linköping, Sweden

Coordinates: 58°22′40″N 15°41′56″E

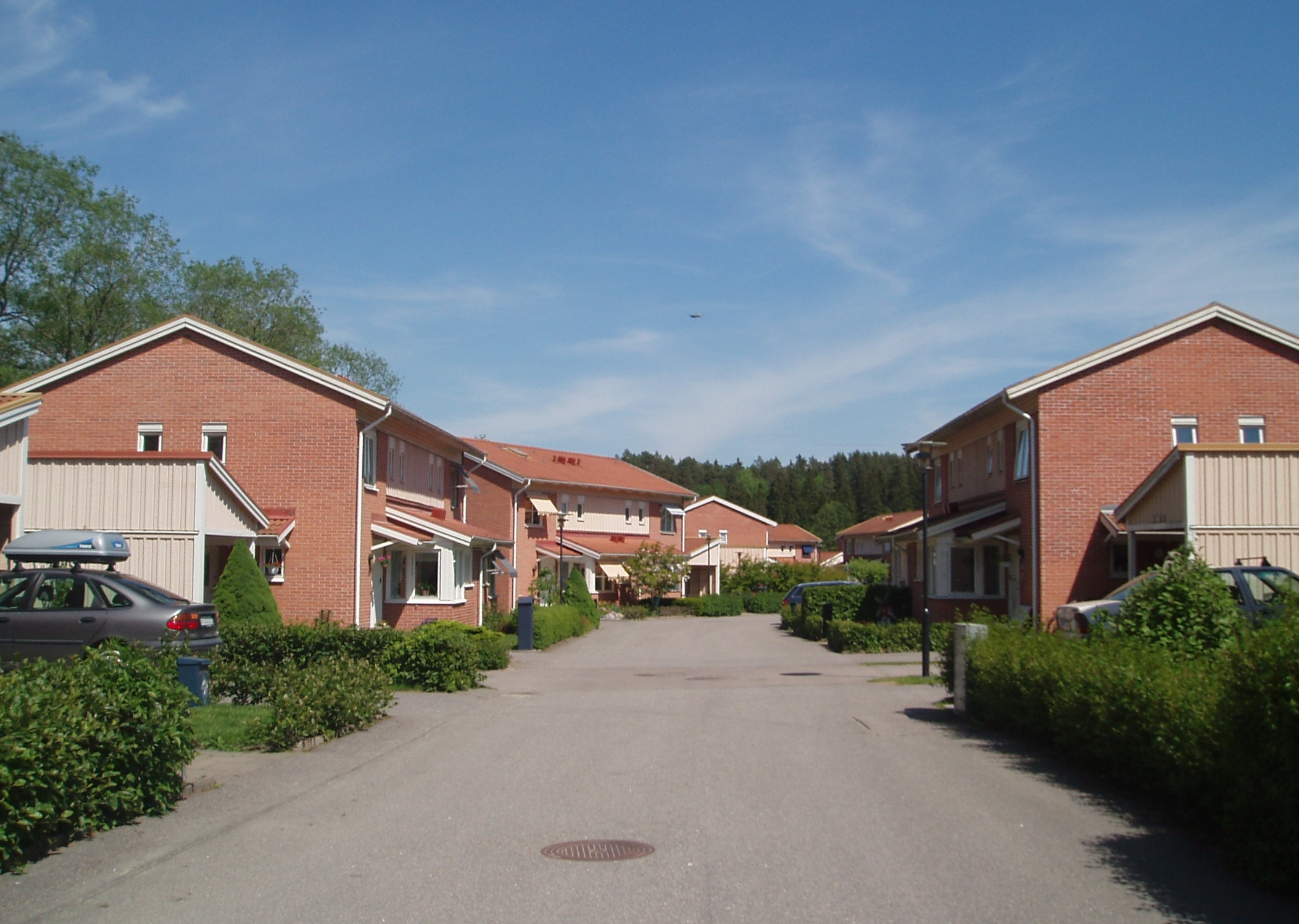
Houses in Jakobsdal, in northern Hjulsbro.

Hjulsbro is a city district in southeastern Linköping in Östergötland. Hjulsbro is located at a waterfall in Stångån in the central part of Landeryd parish.

The northern part of Hjulsbro called Jakobsdal which, among other things, there is a swimming area at Stångån. South of Jakobsdal lies an area known as Kvinneby. Here is Kvinnebyskolan (primary school classes 1–6) and at Stångån Hackefors lock is located. Further south is Hjulsbro proper including Hjulsbro lock, Hjulsbro School (classes 1–6) and the Hjulsbro bath (just south of the road bridge).

The name Hjulsbro derived from the man's name Giurdh, in the oldest written sources mentioned as Giurdhsbro. It is likely that Giurdh was involved in the construction of a bridge over the stream. Probably there was a ford at the site before the bridge was built. Through euphemisms and dialectal changes, it has gradually become Hjulsbro.

Hjulsbro was also the name of a farm with associated mill at the falls. In 1505 the estate was bought by the later renowned Linköping Bishop Hans Brask. In the 1860s a sluice was built in the stream associated with the construction of the Kinda Canal. The old road through Hjulsbro passed through a swing bridge over the lock and a vaulted stone bridge over the rapids.

The farm and the mill remained until 1906 when they were demolished and replaced by a factory, Hjulsbro Wire Mill and Nail Factory. Around the factory the modern community of Hjulsbro grew up. When the East Central Railroad Line was built in 1901, Hjulsbro station was built just east of the community. Added during the 1900s were food shops, fire station, cafés, library, a Good Templar house, Hjulsbro Furniture factory and a school. Just south of the community Hjulsbro yard was located, a repair yard for the Kinda Canal ships during the years 1931–1948.

Districts adjoining Hjulsbro are Johannelund, Hackefors, Ullstämma and Ekholmen.
