= Vi var där blixten hittade ner – Bränt krut vol. 3 =

Vi var där blixten hittade ner - Bränt krut vol. 3

Live album by Lars Winnerbäck
- Released: 2008
- Recorded: 2007
- Genre: Pop

Lars Winnerbäck chronology
Daugava (2007)	Vi var där blixten hittade ner - Bränt krut vol. 3 (2008)	Tänk om jag ångrar mig och sen ångrar mig igen (2009)

Vi var där blixten hittade ner – Bränt krut vol. 3 is a live album by Lars Winnerbäck released in 2008, containing songs recorded live during 2007. Although the album was only available at Winnerbäck concerts during 2008, it reached the number one spot on the Swedish Album Chart.

== Track listing ==
1. Farväl Jupiter
2. Jag har väntat på ett regn
3. Stockholms Kyss
4. Om du lämnade mig nu
5. En tätort på en slätt
6. Och det blåser genom hallen
7. Elegi
8. Hugger i sten
9. Kom ihåg mig
10. Ingen soldat
11. Elden

== Charts ==
=== Weekly charts ===
Chart (2008)	Peak position
Sweden (Sverigetopplistan)	1

=== Year-end charts ===
Chart (2008)	Position
Sweden (Sverigetopplistan)	89
