= Hosanna (disambiguation) =

Hosanna is a liturgical word in Judaism and Christianity.

Hosanna may also refer to:

== Liturgy and music ==
- Hosanna shout, a Mormon ritual
- "Hosanna", a song from Jesus Christ Superstar
- "Hosanna" (A. R. Rahman song), an Indian song with versions in Tamil, Hindi, and Telugu
- "Hosanna" (Paul McCartney song), song on the album New
- "Hosanna" (Kirk Franklin song)
- "Hosianna, Davids son", a 1795 Advent song
- Hosanna: Top 10 Worship Songs, an album by VeggieTales
- Hosianna (album), a 2013 album by Lars Winnerbäck
- Osanna, an Italian rock band
- Hosanna! Music, a Christian music record label
- "Hosanna", a song by Hillsong United from their 2007 album All of the Above

== Places and jurisdictions ==
- Hosanna (Ethiopia), an East African city
- Apostolic Vicariate of Hosanna, Ethiopian Catholic pre-diocesan mission territory with see
- Hosanna Meeting House, an African American church in Pennsylvania

== Other ==
- Château Hosanna, a winery in the Bordeaux region Pomerol
- Hosanna (play), a 1973 play by Michel Tremblay
- Hosanna Kabakoro (born 1992), editor of Mai Life Style
