= Daugava Stadium =

Daugava Stadium may refer to:

- Daugava Stadium (Riga), Latvia
- Daugava Stadium (Daugavpils), Latvia
- Daugava Stadium (Liepāja), Latvia

== See also ==
- Daugava (disambiguation)
