= Johannelund =

City district in Linköping, Sweden

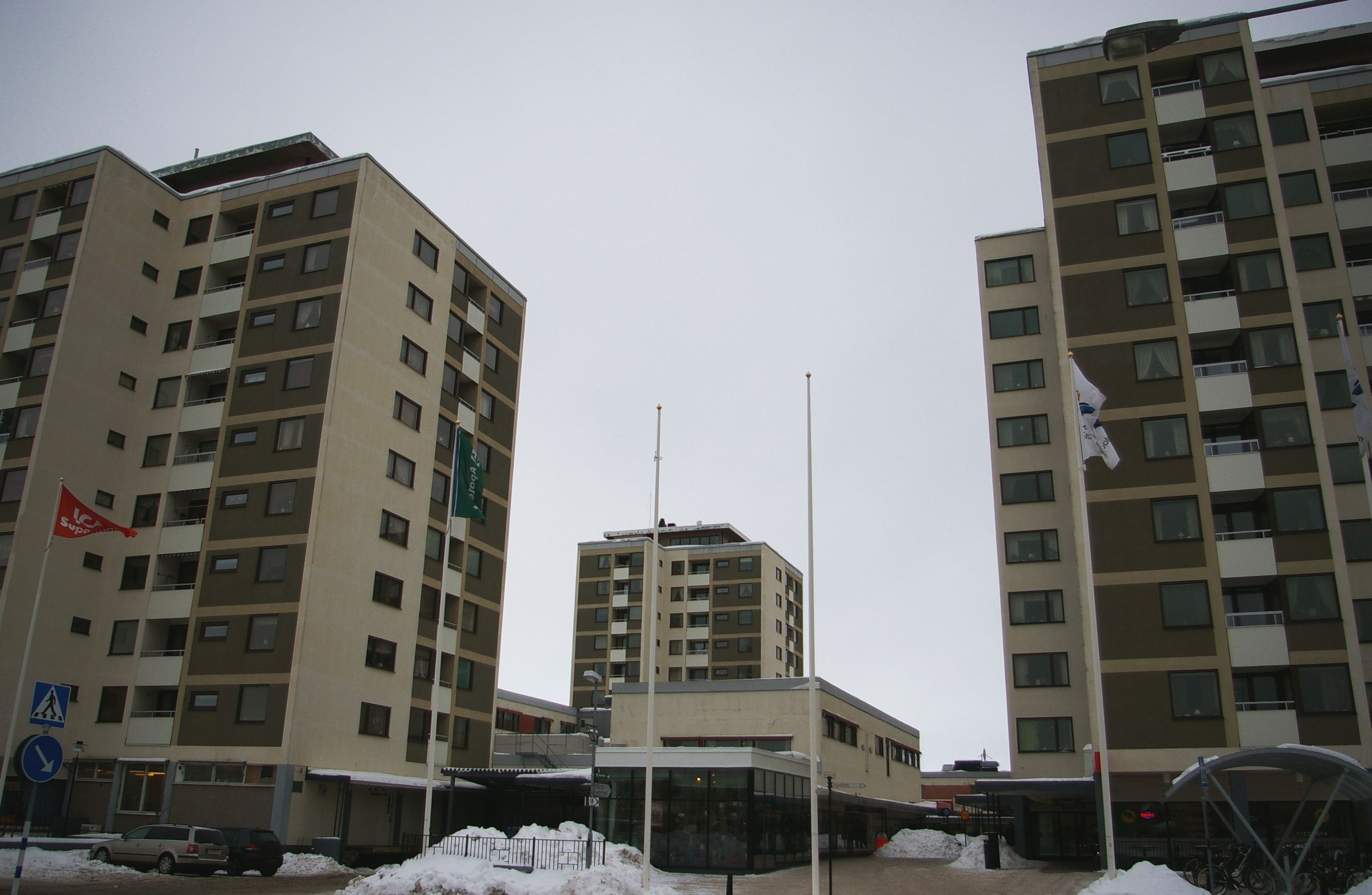
High-rise buildings in central Johannelund.

Johannelund is a city district with more than 5000 inhabitants in the south of Linköping. Johannelund is adjoining the districts Tannefors, Hackefors, Hjulsbro, Berga, Ekholmen, Vimanshäll and Hejdegården. Johannelund consists of the following areas: Johannelund center, Duvkullen, Spångerum, Lower Johannelund, Upper Johannelund, Tennsoldaten and Braskensbro.

Located in Johannelund Center are a healthcare center, a retirement home, a library, a pharmacy, the church of Johannelund Parish, a pizzeria, a café, a betting shop, a hairdresser, a flower shop, a veterinary, a bakery, a clothing store, a cobbler, a reteierment home and a grocery store with postal service. Within the area there are several day- and after-school, primary school and the independent school Nya munken for grades 7-9. Bus connections with Östgötatrafiken are frequent and along Stångån there are also pedestrian and bicycle paths reaching central Linköping city a few kilometers from Johannelund.

Johannelund was the first predominantly suburban project that was built in Linköping and is also part of the Million Programme. Most apartment blocks, with both condominiums and rental apartments, built in 1950s and 1970s. Johannelund has an unemployment rate of 6,4% as of 2021.

Johannelund has many green spaces and proximity to Stångån. The district's allotment areas Emmalund and Ådala, a number of small woods of which the largest and most central is called Johannelund Forest. The district is also soccer fields, tennis courts, swimming and a wading pool. The Johannelund bath in Stångån, north of Brokind trail, was upgraded during the spring of 2011 and was fitted with a lagoon, which was completed in June 2011. The area also has Johannelund Scouts, founded in 1959.
