= Ullstämma =

City district in Linköping, Sweden

Coordinates: 58°22′06″N 15°40′50″E

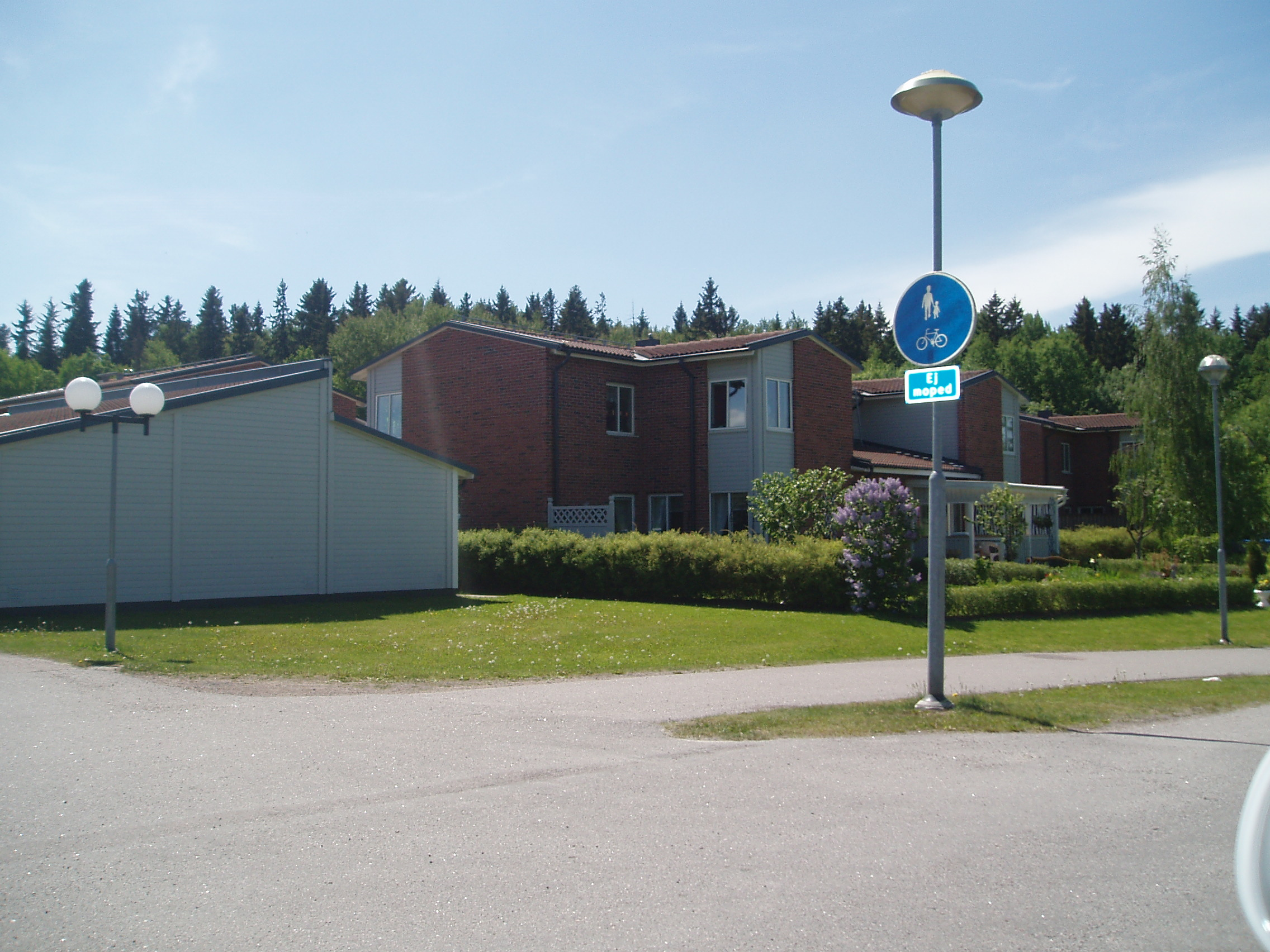
Houses i Ullstämma

Ullstämma is a city district in the south of Linköping. The area was expanded primarily in the 1990s. The area also includes the old buildings in Ullstämma village, which also gave the area its name, including the old Ullstämma school, now closed. The area adjacent to the cultivated farmland in the Östergötland plain.

Districts adjoining Ullstämma are Hjulsbro, Ekholmen, and Vidingsjö.
