= Om du lämnade mig nu =

Single by Lars Winnerbäck & Miss Li

from the album Daugava
- Released: 20 August 2007
- Songwriter: Lars Winnerbäck

Lars Winnerbäck singles chronology
"Stockholms kyss" (2006)	"Om du lämnade mig nu" (2007)	"Strimmor" (2008)

"Om du lämnade mig nu" is a single by Lars Winnerbäck & Miss Li, released on 20 August 2007. The single topped the Swedish singles chart.

On 16 September 2007, the song entered Svensktoppen, topping the chart on 18 November 2007

The song received a Grammis award for "Song of the year 2007" and also won a Rockbjörnen award for "Swedish song of the year 2007". The song also became the second-most successful Trackslistan song of 2007 and the 42nd-most successful Trackslistan song of 2008.

The song was also recorded by Wizex on the 2010 album Innan det är försent and at Dansbandskampen 2010 the song was performed by Elisas.

On 20 September 2009, the song celebrated its second anniversary at Svensktoppen, with a cake and the words "Svensktoppen 2 år" ("Svensktoppen 2 years").

On 10 January 2010, the song had stayed at Svensktoppen for 120 weeks, and on 25 October 2009, it broke the record of the Peter Jöback song "Guldet blev till sand", which between 1997 and 1999 stayed for 110 weeks.

On 10 July 2011, the song celebrated 200 weeks at Svensktoppen.

On 22 April 2012, the song finally left Svensktoppen, after 240 weeks, which meant the song didn't break the all-time record of the song "Du är min man" with 278 weeks.

== Single track listing ==
1. "Om du lämnade mig nu" (duet with Miss Li)
2. "Om du lämnade mig nu (alternate edit)"

== Charts ==
=== Weekly charts ===
Chart (2007–2009)	Peak position
Sweden (Sverigetopplistan)	1

=== Year-end charts ===
Chart (2007)	Position
Sweden (Sverigetopplistan)	11
Chart (2008)	Position
Sweden (Sverigetopplistan)	41
Chart (2009)	Position
Sweden (Sverigetopplistan)	80
