= Långa nätter =

Långa Nätter

Studio album by Melissa Horn
- Released: 30 April 2008
- Genre: pop, acoustic
- Length: 36:29
- Label: Sony BMG
- Producer: Lasse Englund & Jan Radesjö

Melissa Horn chronology
| Långa Nätter (2008) | Säg ingenting till mig (2009) |

Singles from Långa nätter
- 1. "Långa nätter" Released: 16 November 2007; 2. "En famn för mig" Released: 12 May 2008; 3. "Som jag hade dig förut (feat. Lars Winnerbäck)" Released: 3 October 2008

Professional ratings
Review scores
| Source | Rating |
|---|---|
| Aftonbladet | 3/5 stars |
| SVD | 4/6 stars |

Långa nätter is the debut studio album by Swedish singer-songwriter Melissa Horn, released 30 April 2008, on Sony Music Entertainment. It was produced by Lasse Englund and Jan Radesjö. The album features the singles "Långa nätter", "En famn för mig" and "Som jag hade dig förut", a duet with Lars Winnerbäck.

== Track listing ==
All tracks are written by Melissa Horn.

| No. | Title | Length |
|---|---|---|
| 1. | "Kvar i nått jag lämnat" | 3:25 |
| 2. | "Långa nätter" | 3:21 |
| 3. | "Vår sista dans" | 3:00 |
| 4. | "Som jag hade dig förut (feat. Lars Winnerbäck)" | 3:45 |
| 5. | "När det äntligen är över" | 2:45 |
| 6. | "New York" | 3:29 |
| 7. | "En famn för mig" | 3:34 |
| 8. | "Hanna" | 3:05 |
| 9. | "Sen en tid tillbaka" | 3:54 |
| 10. | "Kungsholmens hamn" | 3:32 |
| 11. | "Till hiva" | 2:34 |

== Charts ==
| Chart (2008) | Peak position |
|---|---|
| Swedish Albums Chart | 7 |
