= Daugava (disambiguation) =

The Daugava is a river in Russia, Belarus and Latvia.

Daugava may also refer to:

== Places ==
- Daugava River, or Western Dvina, river rising in the Valdai Hills, Russia, flowing through Russia, Belarus, and Latvia, draining into the Gulf of Riga in Latvia
- Daugava 1 Hydro Power Plant, or Daugavpils hydroelectric power station, a proposed plant in Daugavpils, Latvia

== Sport ==
=== Football clubs ===
- FC Daugava Riga, a Soviet football club from Riga
- FC Pardaugava Riga, a Soviet and Latvian football club
- Torpedo Riga, known as Daugava
- FK Daugava 90, full name FK Rīgas Futbola skola, youth football club in Riga, Latvia in the Latvian First League
- FK Daugava Daugavpils, also known as FC Daugava, Latvian football club in the Latvian Higher League
- FK Daugava (2003), Riga, Latvian football club in the Latvian Higher League

=== Stadiums ===
- Daugava Stadium (Daugavpils), football stadium in Daugavpils, Latvia
- Daugava Stadium (Liepāja), multifunctional stadium in Liepāja, Latvia
- Daugava Stadium (Riga), multifunctional stadium in Riga, Latvia

== Others ==
- Daugava (album), 2007 album by Swedish singer Lars Winnerbäck
- Daugava radar, or Daryal radar, Soviet bistatic phased-array early warning radar
