= Hackefors =

City district in Linköping, Sweden

Coordinates: 58°23′10″N 15°41′56″E

Hackefors (Swedish pronunciation: [ˈhâkːɛˌfɔʂ]) is a city district in southeastern Linköping in Östergötland. It is located east of Stångån in Landeryd parish. Hackefors consists largely of residential buildings. There are also jogging tracks in Hackefors, Åbysäcken, of 2 km, 2.9 km, 5 km and 6.4 km. The Hackefors area was originally a place separate from Linköping, where over the years many renowned companies have been located, such as Malte Månson, Data-Saab and Ericsson. Hackefors had around 300 inhabitants in 1965. Since 1970 Hackefors has grown together with Linköping.

The name Hackefors originated from man's name Hake. Hake was probably a significant person who had possession of this stretch of Stångån. Hackefors village was at Stångån and consisted of Norrgården ("North manor") and Södergården ("South manor"), each with its associated mill at the falls. A redistribution of land in 1860s moved Norrgården out of the village and was called upper Hackefors, while Södergården, which remained by the river was renamed lower Hackefors.

In the late 1860s Kinda Canal was built, and a lock was built in Hackefors. It is Northern Europe's highest one chamber lock. When the East Central Rail Line was built, a stop was built at Hackefors lands.

The foundation for the later development of the community of Hackefors was Hackefors porcelain factory, started in 1929.

The buildings originates partly from the 1930s-1940s, which was homes for local industry employees, and a large number of residential buildings from the 1970s, dedicated to Saab's expansion and to the government agencies which then moved to Linköping. Adjacent to Hackefors the small house area Vårgård was built.

Adjoining Hackefors are districts Johannelund, Tannefors and Hjulsbro.

== Facilities ==
Nearby is the Linköping Motorstadion, which is a multi-use facility that includes track racing, road racing, motocross, motorcycle speedway, rallycross, karting and traffic training. The motorcycle speedway track has hosted many major speedway events.
