= Berga, Linköping =

City district in Linköping, Sweden

Coordinates: 58°23′16″N 15°38′50″E

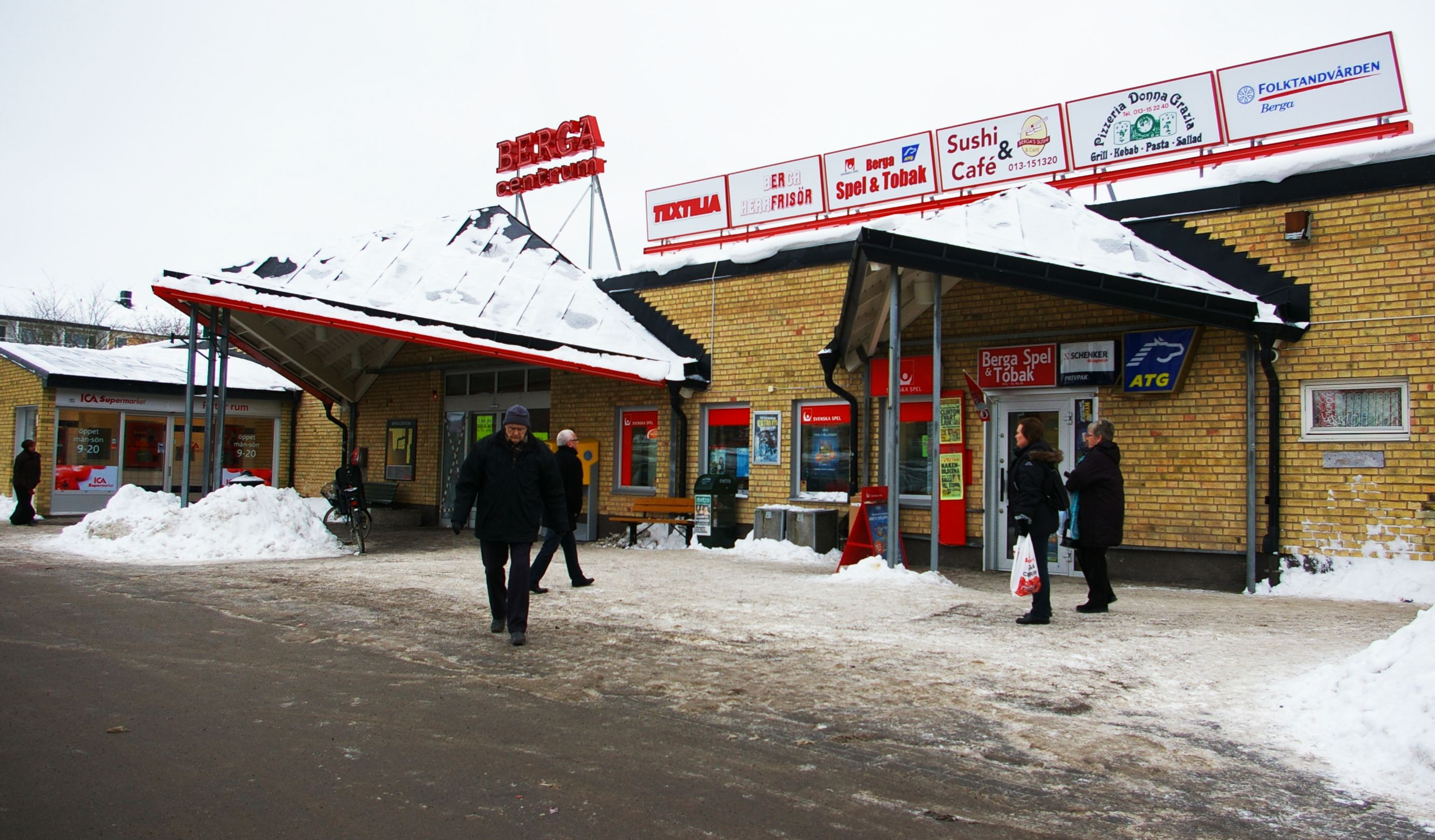
Berga Centre.

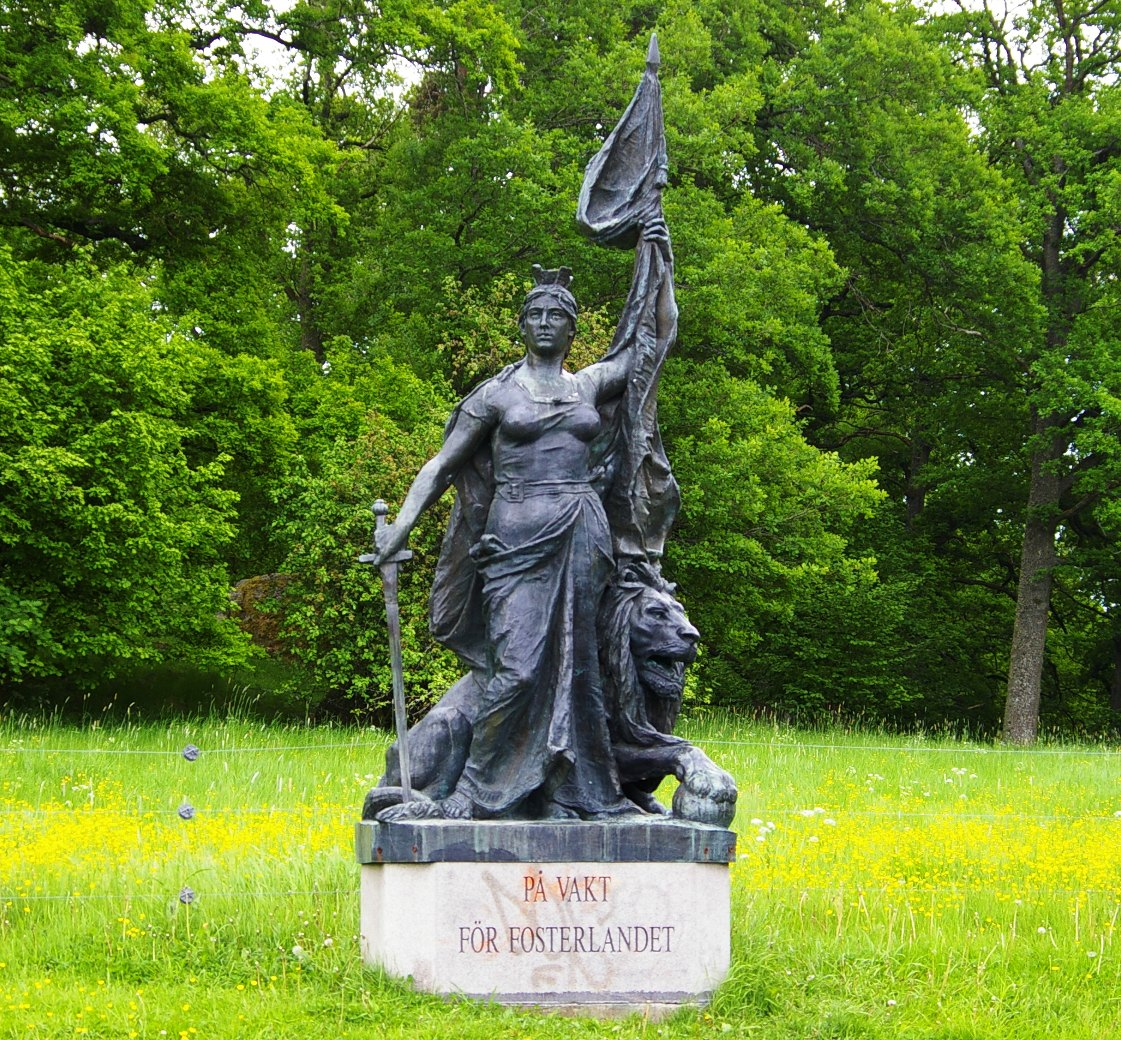
A statue in Berga, "Moder Svea", by Alfred Nyström.

Berga is a city district in Linköping, Sweden, located in the southern part of the city. The river Tinnerbäcken runs through Berga. Berga has a center with a grocery, hairdresser, cafe, pizzeria, sushi, betting shop, clinic, dental services and pharmacy. There is also Berga church that has a circular architecture. The district is known and appreciated for its urban design with nearby nature. There are plans to add more buildings in central parts of Berga. About 80% of the buildings were built in the 1960s as part of the Million Programme. In Berga, there are about 6000 inhabitants, of whom approximately 34.2% were foreign-born (2009), and an unemployment rate of around 12%.

Berga was a country estate the main building of which dates from the 1800s and is known as Berga castle. From its front porch, there is a clear view to Linköping Cathedral. The farm was held by Anton Ridderstad, founder of Östergötland County Museum, who died in 1933 and is one of Linköping major donors. On an adjacent hill Ridderstad created a sculpture park. There, one finds among other things, Alfred Nyström's Moder Svea.

In Berga, or Österberga, school activities at secondary level were conducted until the end of summer vacation 2009. The students had since 2005 gradually been moved to Bäckskolan, Ånestadskolan, Ekholmsskolan, Berzeliusskolan, and Rydskolan depending on where they lived. Bergaskolan's Asperger class moved to Berzeliusskolan.

Berga school has now been demolished and the land has become a flat grassland with occasional traces. The nicely located and area close to nature is now to be developed with houses. Riksbyggen plans to build "BRF Riddarsporren", 46 apartments of 2-6 rooms. It consists partly of an apartment building, which is a building type that has started to appear recently in the otherwise lowly built Berga. In addition, HSB plans to build "Berga Park" with 90 condominiums. Construction was set to start in 2008 but only began in January 2011.

Districts adjoining Berga are Johannelund, Ekholmen, Ramshäll, Vimanshäll, Ekkällan and Vidingsjö.
