= Hum, hum från Humlegårn =

"Hum hum från Humlegårn"

Song by Ragnar Borgedah

from the album Hum hum från Humlegårn
- Language: Swedish
- Released: 1974
- Genre: progg
- Songwriter: Ragnar Borgedahl

Hum hum från Humlegårn is a song written by Ragnar Borgedahl and recorded by him on the 1974 album Hum hum från Humlegårn. Lars Winnerbäck and Hovet recorded the song releasing it as a single on 14 July 2003. scoring a Svensktoppen hit for 25 weeks between 17 August 2003.-1 February 2004 before leaving chart.

The song is also used in the 2004 film "Hum, hum från Humlegårn" Håkan Bråkan & Josef (2004).

== Charts ==
=== Lars Winnerbäck & Hovet version ===
Chart (2003–2004)	Peak position
Sweden (Sverigetopplistan)	4
