= Singel (album) =

Studio album by Lars Winnerbäck
- Released: 2001
- Genre: Pop
- Label: Universal Music

Lars Winnerbäck chronology
Kom (1999)	Singel (2001)	Söndermarken (2003)

Singel is the fifth studio album by the Swedish singer-songwriter Lars Winnerbäck, released in 2001 through Universal Music. The songs "Jag vill gå hem med dig", "Elden" and "Håll ut" were released as singles, and Winnerbäck later won a Grammis Award for "Best Male Pop/Rock".

== Track listing ==
1. "Elden" ("The Fire")
2. "Jag vill gå hem med dig" ("I Want to Go Home with You")
3. "Om tiden vill ifatt" ("If Time Wants to Catch Up")
4. "Nånting större" ("Something Bigger")
5. "Du hade tid" (cover of "You Had Time" by Ani DiFranco)
6. "Håll ut" ("Hold On")
7. "Sen du var här" "Since You Were Here"
8. "Lovesång" ("Love Song")
9. "För den som letar" ("For the One Searching")
10. "Lycklig och förvånad" ("Happy and Astonished")
11. "I dina ögon" ("In Your Eyes")
12. "Singel"

== Charts ==
=== Weekly charts ===
Chart (2001)	Peak position	Certification
Sweden (Sverigetopplistan)	1	GLF: Gold

=== Year-end charts ===
Chart (2001)	Position
Sweden (Sverigetopplistan)	40
