= Ekholmen =

City district in Linköping, Sweden

Coordinates: 58°22′50″N 15°40′50″E

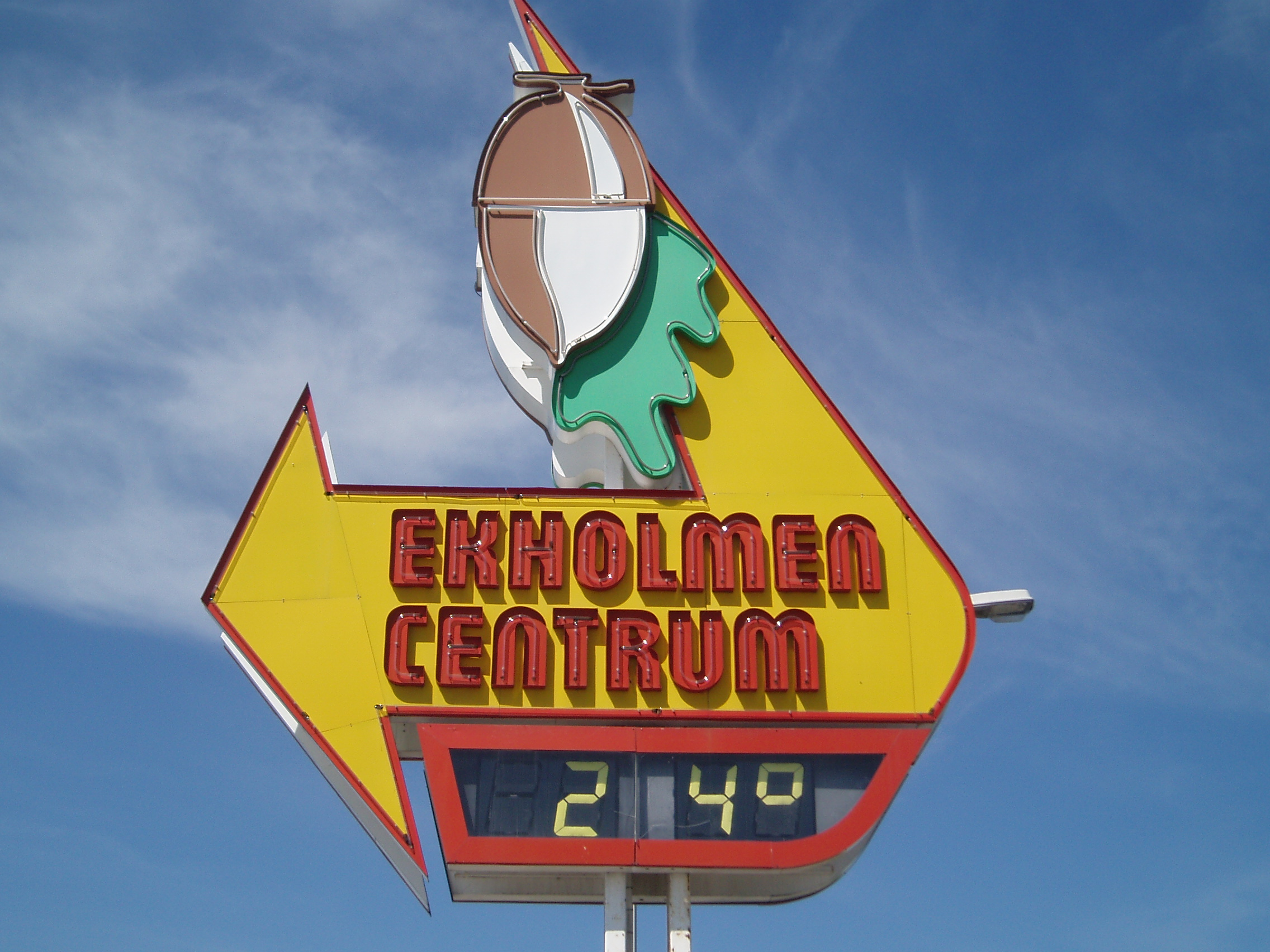
Sign outside Ekholmens centrum (removed 2009)

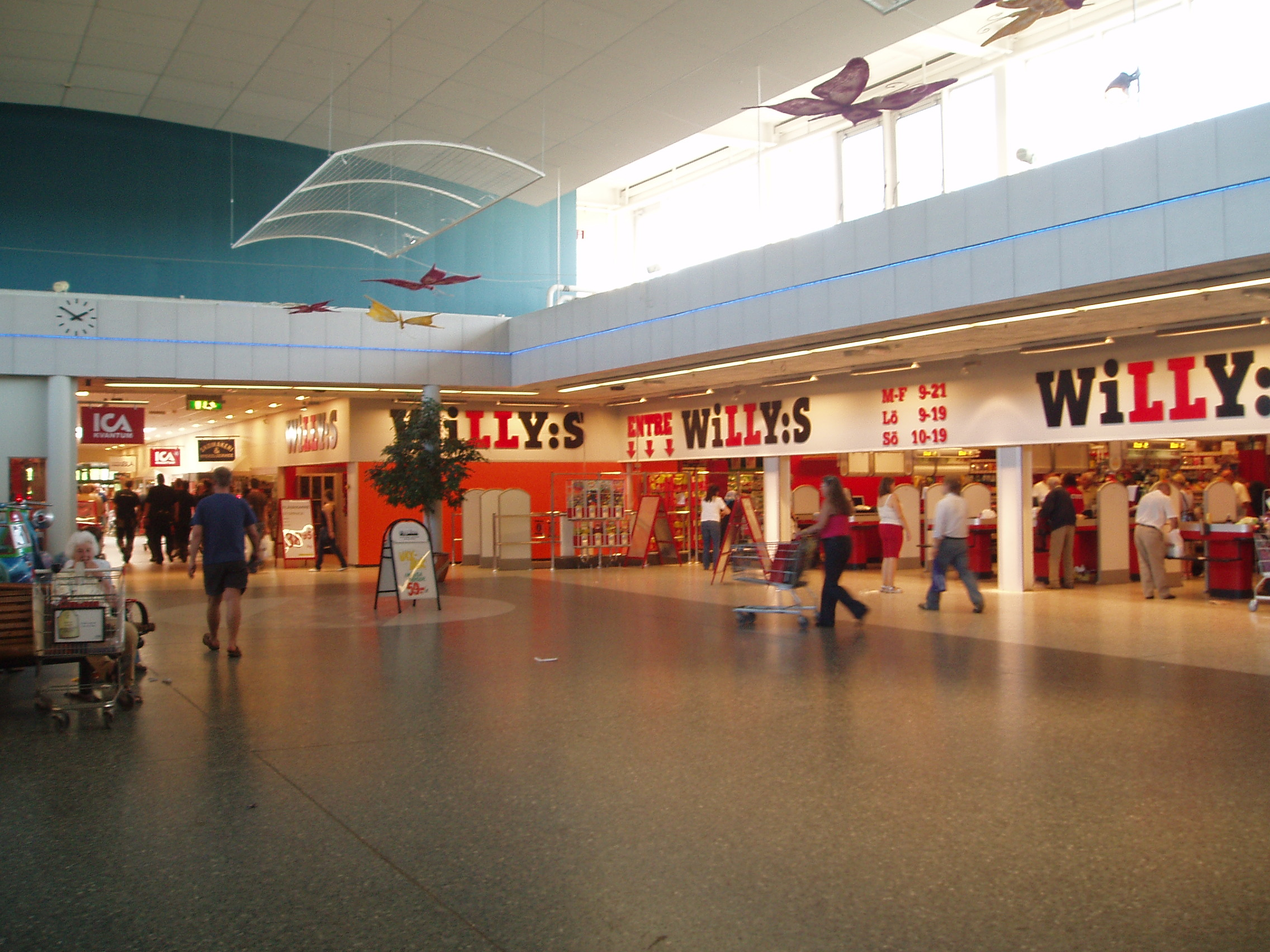
Inside Ekholmens center.

Ekholmen is a city district in the south of Linköping, Sweden. The area was built in the early 1970s, on land belonging mainly to the farming estates Blästad and Ekholmen, and is located in Landeryd Parish.

The area has a shopping mall called Ekholmen center. Outside of the mall, St. Hans Church (consecrated 1973) is located. Fun SkatePark is located at the area's secondary school, Ekholmsskolan.

Ekholmen's residential parts are composed of both high-rise apartments and small houses. Ekholmen was part of the Million Programme, which is the Swedish Project Areas built in 1965–1975.

Ekholmen borders to the districts Johannelund, Hjulsbro, Ullstämma, Vidingsjö and Berga.
