= Säg ingenting till mig =

2009 studio album by Melissa Horn

Studio album by Melissa Horn
- Released: 14 October 2009
- Length: 38:19
- Label: Svedala; Sony
- Producer: Ola Gustafsson

Melissa Horn chronology
| Långa nätter (2008) | Säg ingenting till mig (2009) | Innan jag kände dig (2011) |

Singles from Säg ingenting till mig
- 1. "Lät du henne komma närmre" Released: 25 September 2009; 2. "Jag kan inte skilja på" Released: 27 November 2009; 3. "Falla fritt" Released: 9 April 2010

Professional ratings
Review scores
| Source | Rating |
|---|---|
| Aftonbladet | 3/5 stars |
| Expressen | 2/5 stars |
| Svenska Dagbladet | 4/6 stars |

Säg ingenting till mig (transl. Don't Say Anything to Me) is the second studio album by Swedish singer-songwriter Melissa Horn, released on 14 October 2009 by Svedala and Sony Music. It was produced by Ola Gustafsson.

== Track listing ==
All tracks are written by Melissa Horn.

| No. | Title | Length |
|---|---|---|
| 1. | "Jag kan inte skilja på" | 4:50 |
| 2. | "Lät du henne komma närmre" | 4:29 |
| 3. | "Hur ska det gå?" | 3:19 |
| 4. | "Tyck synd om mig nu" | 3:40 |
| 5. | "Säg ingenting till mig" | 3:33 |
| 6. | "Vem lämnade vem" | 4:11 |
| 7. | "Jag vet vem jag är när jag är hos dig" | 3:03 |
| 8. | "Med ena foten utanför" | 3:50 |
| 9. | "Jag ska sakna dig imorgon" | 3:24 |
| 10. | "Falla fritt" | 4:00 |

== Charts ==
=== Weekly charts ===
Weekly chart performance for Säg ingenting till mig
| Chart (2009–2010) | Peak position |
|---|---|
| Danish Albums (Hitlisten) | 15 |
| Norwegian Albums (VG-lista) | 2 |
| Swedish Albums (Sverigetopplistan) | 4 |

=== Year-end charts ===
2009 year-end chart performance for Säg ingenting till mig
| Chart (2009) | Position |
|---|---|
| Swedish Albums (Sverigetopplistan) | 44 |
| Swedish Albums & Compilations (Sverigetopplistan) | 68 |

2010 year-end chart performance for Säg ingenting till mig
| Chart (2010) | Position |
|---|---|
| Swedish Albums (Sverigetopplistan) | 22 |
| Swedish Albums & Compilations (Sverigetopplistan) | 28 |
