= Sånger ur Trähatten 1982–2000 =

Compilation album by Johan Johansson (KSMB)
- Released: 2001
- Recorded: 1982–2000

Sånger ur Trähatten 1982–2000 is a 2 CD compilation album of Swedish musician Johan Johansson released in 2001.

== Track listing ==
=== CD 1 ===
1. Va?! (Johan Johansson)
2. Skit! (Johan Johansson)
3. Friheten och jag (Strindbergs)
4. Vi kommer aldrig fram (John Lenin)
5. Snöman (Johan Johansson)
6. Italien (Strindbergs)
7. Lat man sleaze twist (Johan Johansson)
8. Josef & Maria (Johan Johansson)
9. Om du överhuvudtaget bryr dig (Johan Johansson and Sator)
10. Bollar (Strindbergs)
11. Libertad (John Lenin)
12. Sång på Svansjön (Johan Johansson)
13. Respektfulla gatan (Strindbergs)
14. Tango rörande visit i förorten (av f.d. innehavare till stol #1 i Sveriges Riksdag) (Johan Johansson and Stefan Sundström)
15. Kärlek och respekt till Moder Jord (Never turn your back on Mother Earth) (Johan Johansson)
16. Linan som vi dansar på (Johan Johansson och Weeping Willows)
17. Lost (Johan Johansson)
18. Bygg en mur runt oss som har allting (Something for the girl with everything) (Johan Johansson)
19. Min kärleks blues (Johan Johansson)

=== CD 2 ===
1. (Gör mig) Dum (Johan Johansson)
2. Världens bästa dåliga exempel (Johan Johansson)
3. Min lilla svarta själ (Johan Johansson)
4. Snabbare än tiden (Strindbergs)
5. Det land vi har är stort nog åt alla oss (This town ain't big enough for both of us) (Johan Johansson)
6. Om jag tackar Gud för allting (Johan Johansson)
7. Kvasibarn (Strindbergs)
8. Blått & Guld (live) (Johan Johansson)
9. Bombpartyt (Strindbergs)
10. Karusellflickan (Johan Johansson)
11. Ja, jag tror jag drunknar i kärleken till mig själv (Falling in love with myself again) (Johan Johansson)
12. Dom älskade (John Lenin)
13. Please, don't you shoot at Jesus (Johan Johansson)
14. Höga odds (på att det är min dag) (Johan Johansson)
15. Öppna dörrar och gästfrihet (Hospitality on Parade) (Johan Johansson)
16. Spanska flamman (Johan Johansson)
17. Polsk Zchlager (live) (Johan Johansson)
18. Tango i pampars land
19. Din gyllene regel (Strindbergs)
