= Innan jag kände dig =

Studio album by Melissa Horn
- Released: 14 September 2011
- Genre: pop, acoustic
- Length: 40:05
- Label: Sony/Svedala
- Producer: Ola Gustafsson

Melissa Horn chronology
Säg ingenting till mig (2009)	Innan jag kände dig (2011)	Om du vill vara med mig (2013)

Singles from Innan jag kände dig
- 1. "Innan jag kände dig" Released: 10 June 2011; 2. "Under löven" Released: 19 August 2011

Professional ratings
Review scores
Source	Rating
SVD	4/6 stars
Göteborgs-Posten	3/5 stars
Dagens Nyheter	3/5 stars
GAFFA	4/6 stars

Innan jag kände dig is the third studio album by the Swedish singer-songwriter Melissa Horn, released on 14 September 2011, by Sony/Svedala. It was produced by Ola Gustafsson.

== Track listing ==
All tracks are written by Melissa Horn.

No.	Title	Length
1.	"Destruktiv blues"	3:13
2.	"Jag saknar dig mindre och mindre"	4:32
3.	"Om du letar efter nån"	4:05
4.	"Nåt annat än det här"	2:35
5.	"Under löven"	3:34
6.	"Du är nog den"	4:22
7.	"Dom som bländats av ljuset"	3:27
8.	"Mardrömmar"	3:47
9.	"På låtsas"	3:08
10.	"Innan jag kände dig"	3:37
11.	"Det känns ännu sämre nu"	3:46

== Charts ==
Chart (2011)	Peak position
Danish Albums Chart	26
Norwegian Albums Chart	3
Swedish Albums Chart	1
