= Med solen i ögonen =

Studio album by Lars Winnerbäck
- Released: 1998
- Recorded: 1998
- Genre: Pop
- Label: Universal Music
- Producer: Johan Johansson

Lars Winnerbäck chronology
Rusningstrafik (1996)	Med solen i ögonen (1998)	Kom (1999)

Med solen i ögonen is the third studio album by Swedish singer-songwriter Lars Winnerbäck, released in 1998. The album was produced by Johan Johansson and released by Universal Music. The title track of the album was released as a single in February 1999. The album has been certified platinum in Sweden and peaked at number 13 on the Swedish Album Chart, which it did in 2011.

== Track listing ==
Adapted from Apple Music.

1. Gråa dagar (4:52), Grey Days
2. Tvivel (5:26), Doubt
3. Mamma är säkert nöjd (3:57), Mom is Probably Pleased
4. Idiot (2:56)
5. Pacemaker (5:57)
6. Pollenchock & stjärnfall (4:58), Pollen Shock and Shooting Stars
7. Att fånga en fjäril (4:16), To Catch a Butterfly
8. Vinter över ån (4:11), Winter on the Stream
9. Solen i ögonen (3:31), The Sun in Your Eyes
10. Med bussen från stan (4:30), With the Bus from the City
11. Varning för ras (4:58), Beware of Avalanches

== Charts ==
Chart (1998–2011)	Peak position
Sweden (Sverigetopplistan)	13
