= Rusningstrafik =

Studio album by Lars Winnerbäck
- Released: 1997
- Recorded: 1997
- Genre: Pop
- Producer: Johan Johansson

Lars Winnerbäck chronology
Dans med svåra steg (1996)	Rusningstrafik (1997)	Med solen i ögonen (1999)

Rusningstrafik is the second studio album by Swedish singer-songwriter Lars Winnerbäck, released in 1997.

== Track listing ==
1. "En av alla dom", One of Them All
2. "Ingen har lust", No One Feels Like
3. "Nån annan", Someone Else
4. "Rusningstrafik", Rush Hour
5. "Höst på min planet", Autumn on My Planet
6. "Balladen om konsekvenser", The ballad About Consequences
7. "Vår för hjärter dam", Spring for the Queen of Hearts
8. "Psalm i januari", Psalm in January
9. "En svår och jobbig grej", A Difficult and Tough Thing
10. "Låg", Low
11. "Nu är alla små stjärnor", Now Everyone Are Little Stars
12. "Vänner", Friends

== Charts ==
Chart (1997)	Peak position
Sweden (Sverigetopplistan)	58
