= Hovet (album) =

Studio album by Hovet
- Released: October 20th 2004
- Recorded: 2004
- Genre: Rock, pop, singer/songwriter
- Label: Hovet Records

Hovet is the self-titled debut album from Lars Winnerbäck's backup band Hovet. The album was recorded while Winnerbäck was focusing on his acoustic album Vatten under broarna.

== Track listing ==
1. "Bästa orkestern" (Lyrics: Andersson; Arrangements: Hovet)
2. "Rester" (Lyrics and arrangements: Persson, Schultz, Back, Zackrisson)
3. "Hawaii Persson" (Lyrics and arrangements: Eriksson, Back)
4. "Silverfisken" (Lyrics and arrangements: Eriksson, Andersson, Zackrisson)
5. "Våra hjärtan" (Lyrics and arrangements: Zackrisson, Persson, Stadling)
6. "Svarta segel" (Lyrics and arrangements: Persson, Stadling, Back, Zackrisson)
7. "Vi gillar varann" (Lyrics and arrangements: Eriksson, Andersson)
8. "Julia" (Lyrics and arrangements: Zackrisson, Persson)
9. "Odenplan 1 min" (Lyrics and arrangements: Eriksson)
10. "Brinner" (Lyrics and arrangements: Stadling, Schultz, Persson)
11. "Bandet" (Lyrics and arrangements: Back)
12. "Vacker & lugn" (Lyrics and arrangements: Atadling, Back)
13. "2:a Advent" (Lyrics and arrangements: Zackrisson, Back, Andersson, Eriksson)
