= Bland skurkar, helgon och vanligt folk =

Live album by Swedish artists

Live album by Stefan Sundström, Lars Winnerbäck, Johan Johansson, Karin Renberg, and Kjell Höglund
- Released: 1999
- Recorded: 1999
- Label: Birdnest

Bland skurkar, helgon och vanligt folk (Among villains, saints and ordinary folk) is a live album recorded during a 1999 Swedish summer tour of the same name, by the band Bland skurkar, helgon och vanligt folk. It includes tracks by Stefan Sundström, Lars Winnerbäck, Johan Johansson, Karin Renberg, and Kjell Höglund, who made up the band.

The album was released by Birdnest Records on 25 October 1999. It contained songs from three concerts.

The band made its debut on 24 May 1999 at Kulturhuset (Studion stage) in Stockholm. They then went on to tour various festivals that summer, ending the tour in Örebro on 21 August. They were awarded the jury award at the Expressen Livegadden Gala in 1999. Winnerbäck left the band in 1999, and was replaced by Carl-Einar Häckner at the beginning of the year 2000.

== Track listing ==
1. Bland helgon, skurkar och vanligt folk (Kjell Höglund)
2. Gråa dagar (Lars Winnerbäck)
3. Polsk zchlager ( Johan Johansson)
4. Marguerite (Karin Renberg)
5. Skakad (Karin Renberg)
6. Nån har slagit upp ett hål (Stefan Sundström)
7. Holländsk genever (Kjell Höglund)
8. Tango i pampars land (Johan Johansson)
9. Augustin (Stefan Sundström)
10. Sabina gör en konst utav att gå (Stefan Sundström)
11. Kom (Lars Winnerbäck)
12. Va?! (Johan Johansson)
13. Fri sprit och taxi hem (Stefan Sundström)
14. Solen i ögonen (Lars Winnerbäck)
15. Jag hör hur dom ligger med varandra i våningen ovanför (Kjell Höglund)
16. Med bussen från stan (Lars Winnerbäck)
