= Melissa Horn =

Swedish singer

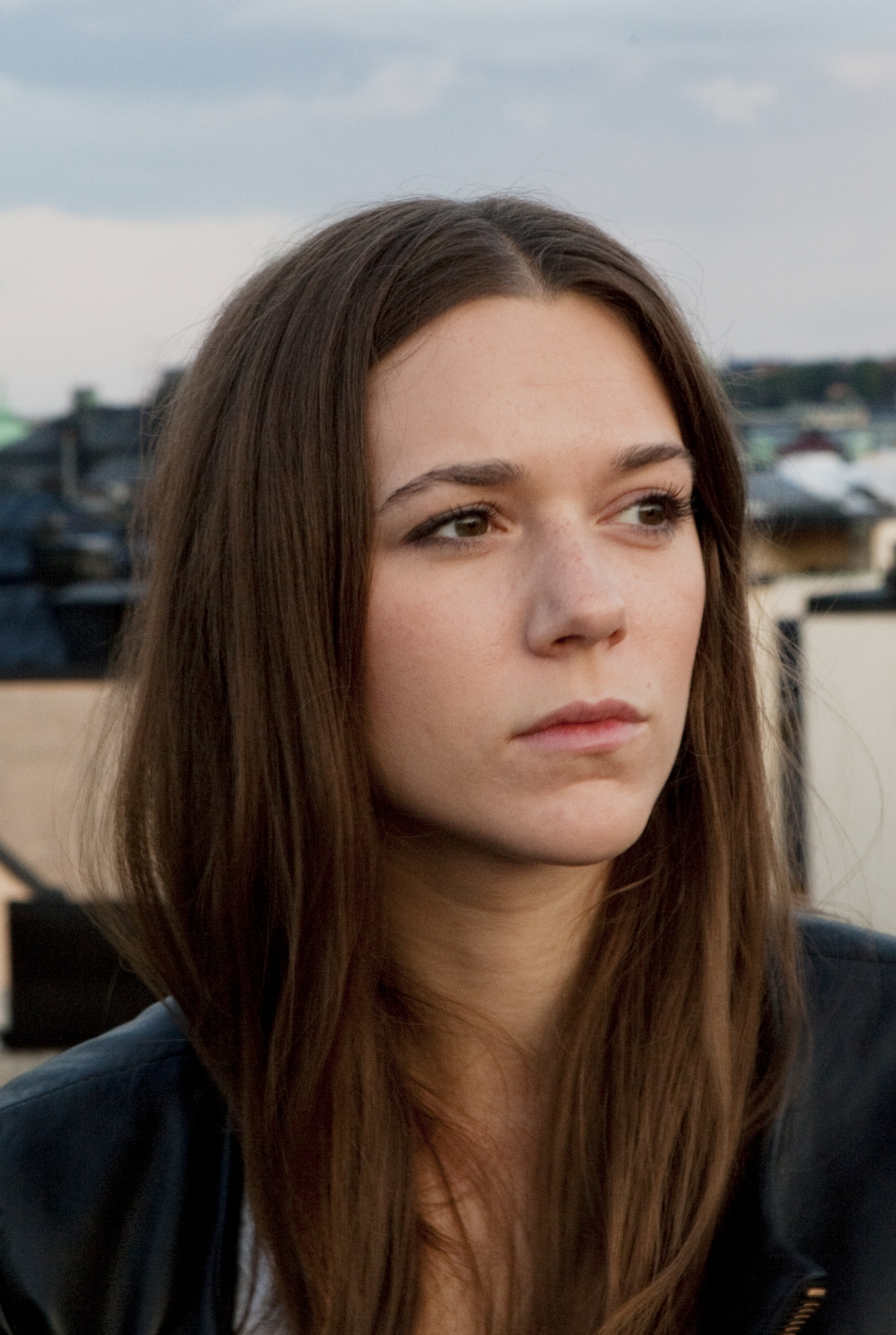

Background information
- Born: Astrid Melissa Edwarda Horn Weitzberg; 8 April 1987 (age 39)
- Origin: Östermalm, Stockholm, Sweden
- Genres: Pop, acoustic
- Occupation: Singer-songwriter
- Instrument: Vocals
- Years active: 2007–present
- Label: Sony BMG
- Website: melissahorn.se

Astrid Melissa Edwarda Horn Weitzberg (born 8 April 1987), known as Melissa Horn, is a Swedish pop artist and social activist. She is the daughter of singer Maritza Horn.

== Biography ==
She was born to singer Maritza Horn (born 1951), and Edvard Terrence Weitzberg (born 1955) in an area in Östermalm, part of Stockholm. She has four siblings, all boys. Her parents got her a guitar when she turned 16 and not long afterwards she wrote her first song. She took vocal courses and then got hold of a producer and eventually got a record contract before she finished high school. In 2010, she started a company called Edward AB.

== Career ==
Melissa Horn's debut album Långa nätter was released on 30 April 2008 followed by Säg ingenting till mig on 14 October 2009. This record eventually went gold, exposing her to a larger audience; she was nominated for Gramiss (Swedish equivalent of the Grammy Awards) in the categories Artist of the Year, Composer of the Year and Lyricist of the Year. A sequel to that album Innan jag kände dig was launched on 16 September 2011 and topped the Swedish Album Charts within its first week of release. She promoted it with a tour in Norway, Denmark and Sweden. Her fourth album Om du vill vara med mig was released on 2 October 2013 and her fifth album entitled Jag går nu came out on 27 November 2015. All her releases are in Swedish.

Horn also sang "Kungsholmens hamn" in a memorial ceremony for the victims of the 2011 Norway attacks in Utøya and Oslo.

After 4 years of hiatus since her last release, Melissa Horn released a new album Konstgjord andning on 13 September 2019. She is collaborating with singer Kaah and singer White Collar.

== Discography ==
=== Studio albums ===
Title	Details	Peak chart positions		
Title	Details	SWE	NOR	DEN
Långa nätter	Released: 30 April 2008; Label: Sony Music/Arista; Format: CD, Digital download	7	—	—
Säg ingenting till mig	Released: 14 October 2009; Label: Sony Music; Format: CD, digital download	4	2	15
Innan jag kände dig	Released: 14 September 2011; Label: Sony Music/Svedala; Format: CD, digital download	1	3	26
Om du vill vara med mig	Released: 2 October 2013; Label: Sony Music/Svedala; Format: CD, digital download	2	1	—
Jag går nu	Released: 27 November 2015; Label: Sony Music; Format: CD, LP, digital download	4	9	—
Konstgjord andning	Released: 13 September 2019; Label: Sony Music; Format: CD, LP, digital download, streaming	4	35	—
Den jag kunde blivit – Den jag blev	Released: 6 September 2024; Label: Sony Music; Format: CD, LP, digital download, streaming	6	—	—

=== EPs ===
Title	Details	Peak chart positions
Title	Details	SWE
Så mycket bättre 2021 – Tolkningarna	Released: 18 December 2021; Label: Sony Music; Format: Digital download	3

=== Singles ===
Year	Title	Peak chart positions		Album
Year	Title	SWE	NOR	Album
2007	"Långa nätter"	—	—	Långa nätter
2007	"Kungsholmens Hamn"	—	3	Långa nätter
2008	"En famn för mig"	—	—	Långa nätter
2008	"Som jag hade dig förut" (with Lars Winnerbäck)	58	—	Långa nätter
2009	"Lät du henne komma närmre"	20	—	Säg ingenting till mig
2009	"Jag kan inte skilja på"	52	—	Säg ingenting till mig
2010	"Falla fritt"	—	—	Säg ingenting till mig
2011	"Innan jag kände dig"	—	—	Innan jag kände dig
2011	"Under löven"	40	—	Innan jag kände dig
2011	"Jag saknar dig mindre och mindre"	35	—	Innan jag kände dig
2013	"Om du vill vara med mig"	52	—	Om du vill vara med mig
2015	"Du går nu"	52	—	Jag går nu
2015	"Jag har gjort det igen"	—	—	Jag går nu
2019	"Du brukade kalla mig för baby" (featuring Kaah)	— (Note: "Du brukade kalla mig för baby" did not enter the Swedish Singellista Chart, but peaked at number six on the Swedish Heatseeker Chart.)	—	Konstgjord andning
2019	"För varje gång"	— (Note: "För varje gång" did not enter the Swedish Singellista Chart, but peaked at number three on the Swedish Heatseeker Chart.)	—	Konstgjord andning
2021	"Lämna honom"	3	—	Så mycket bättre
2021	"Aldrig vågat"	18	—	Så mycket bättre
2021	"Lova ingenting"	42	—	Så mycket bättre
2021	"Dum av dig"	48	—	Så mycket bättre
2021	"Parklands"	56	—	Så mycket bättre
2021	"Älska mig"	92	—	Så mycket bättre
2024	"Säg förlåt"	69	—	Den jag kunde blivit – Den jag blev
2024	"Varför slutar allt i tårar"	— (Note: "Varför slutar allt i tårar" did not enter the Swedish Singellista Chart, but peaked at number 11 on the Swedish Heatseeker Chart.)	—	Den jag kunde blivit – Den jag blev
2024	"Hejdå för alltid"	— (Note: "Hejdå för alltid" did not enter the Swedish Singellista Chart, but peaked at number three on the Swedish Heatseeker Chart.)	—	Den jag kunde blivit – Den jag blev
2024	"Den jag kunde blivit – Den jag blev"	75	—	Den jag kunde blivit – Den jag blev
