= Jag går nu =

Studio album by Melissa Horn
- Released: 27 November 2015

Melissa Horn chronology
Om du vill vara med mig (2013)	Jag går nu (2015)	Konstgjord andning (2019)

Singles from Jag går nu
- 1. "Du går nu" Released: 9 October 2015

Jag går nu is the fifth studio album by singer-songwriter Melissa Horn, which was released on 27 November 2015. Its first single Du går nu was released on 9 October 2015, and its second single "Jag har gjort det igen", on 20 November 2015.

== Track listing ==
All tracks are written by Melissa Horn

No.	Title	Length
1.	"Jag har gjort det igen"
2.	"I mörkret långt ifrån varann"
3.	"Du går nu"
4.	"De två årstiderna"
5.	"Där går mitt liv"
6.	"Livet ropade"
7.	"Efter jul"
8.	"En helt vanlig dag"
9.	"Jag gör aldrig om det här"

== Charts ==
=== Weekly charts ===
Chart (2015)	Peak position
Swedish Albums (Sverigetopplistan)	4

=== Year-end charts ===
Chart (2016)	Position
Sweden (Sverigetopplistan)	56
