= Linköping Motorstadion =

Stadium in Linköping, Sweden

- Location: Hackefors, Linköping, Sweden
- Coordinates: 58°23′43″N 15°43′34″E
- Opened: 1965

Linköping Motorstadion also called the Sviestad Motorstadion is a multi-use facility that includes track racing, road racing, motocross, motorcycle speedway, rallycross, karting and traffic training. It is located in Hackefors, which is on the south east outskirts of Linköping, Sweden.

== History ==
The facility was built in 1965 as a practice site for traffic training. Adjacent to the traffic training and road racing facilities is a motorcycle speedway track.

The speedway track hosted the Nordic Speedway Final in 1969 and 1990. It was also the home of the speedway team called Filbyterna who competed in the Swedish Speedway Team Championship at the venue from 1978 until their closure in 2010.

The stadium hosted the World Championship round called the Speedway Grand Prix of Sweden from 1995 to 2000.

Despite the speedway track having no resident team since 2010, the track still remains a significant choice of venue for major speedway meetings, most recently the 2022 Swedish Individual Speedway Championship.
