= Winnerbäck - Ett slags liv =

Winnerbäck – Ett slags liv
- Directed by: Øystein Karlsen
- Starring: Lars Winnerbäck; Rolf Lassgård; Per Gessle; Melissa Horn
- Release date: 6 October 2017 (Sweden)
- Running time: 90 minutes
- Country: Sweden
- Language: Swedish

Winnerbäck – Ett slags liv (Winnerbäck – A Kind of Life) is a 2017 documentary film about Swedish musician Lars Winnerbäck, directed by Øystein Karlsen, marking 20 years of the singer's career. It includes interviews with the subject and concert footage. To get around Winnerbäck's dislike of interviewers and cameras, his wife Agnes Kittelsen was given a camera to record some of the footage, Karlsen stating "I gave a camera to his wife, so that she could film him when he least expected it".

The film was premiered on 6 October, 2017.
