= Om du vill vara med mig =

Studio album by Melissa Horn
- Released: 2 October 2013
- Recorded: Puk Recording Studios, (Gjerlev, Denmark)
- Genre: pop, acoustic
- Length: 36:45
- Label: Sony/Svedala
- Producer: Ola Gustafsson

Melissa Horn chronology
Innan jag kände dig (2011)	Om du vill vara med mig (2013)	Jag går nu (2015)

Singles from Om du vill vara med mig
- 1. "Om du vill vara med mig" Released: 30 August 2013

Professional ratings
Review scores
Source	Rating
SVD	4/6 stars
Göteborgs-Posten	2/5 stars
GAFFA	4/6 stars

Om du vill vara med mig is the fourth studio album by the Swedish singer-songwriter Melissa Horn, released October 2, 2013, on Sony/Svedala. It was produced by Ola Gustafsson.

== Track listing ==
All tracks are written by Melissa Horn.

No.	Title	Length
1.	"Om du vill vara med mig"	5:17
2.	"Natten på hotellet"	4:34
3.	"Jag vet"	3:55
4.	"Säg att du behöver mig"	4:27
5.	"Jag har inte gett upp oss än"	3:44
6.	"Ett sent förlåt"	3:54
7.	"Drömmen om Alice"	4:09
8.	"Du är värd det"	3:51
9.	"Nog nu"	2:54

== Charts ==
Charts (2013)	Peak position
Norwegian Albums Chart	1
Swedish Albums Chart	2
