= Vidingsjö =

City district in Linköping, Sweden

Coordinates: 58°22′47″N 15°38′47″E

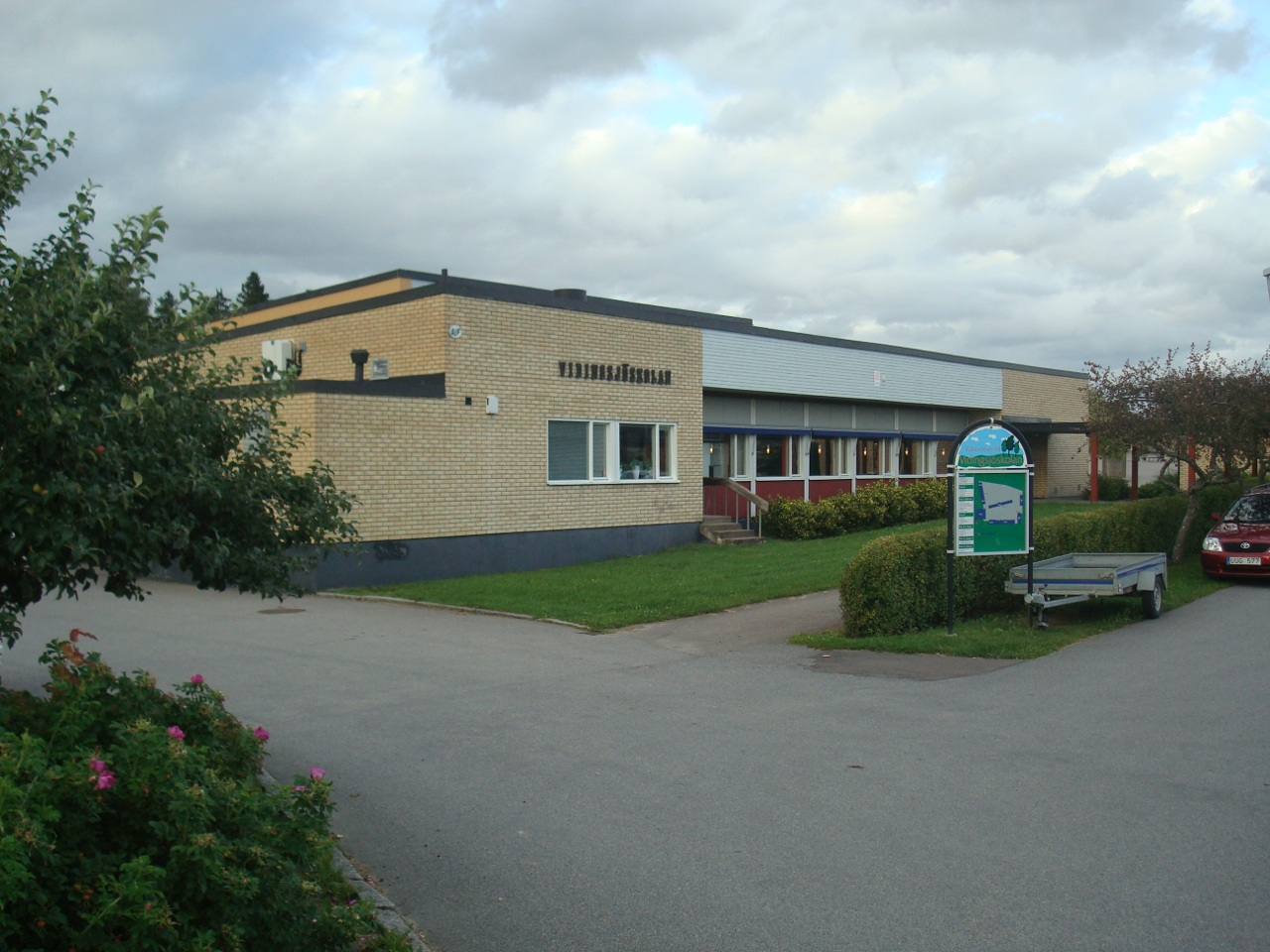
Vidingsjöskolan

Vidingsjö is a city district in the south of Linköping, Sweden with a population of 4,028 persons (2025). The buildings consist mainly of single-family homes built in the 1960s, 70s and 80s. There is a fitness center, a pizzeria and one supermarket. Tinnerbäcken runs through Vidingsjö.

Musician Lars Winnerbäck and comedian Anders Johansson are from Vidingsjö.

Vidingsjö borders to the districts Ekholmen and Berga
