= Kom (album) =

Studio album by Lars Winnerbäck
- Released: 1999
- Recorded: 1999
- Genre: Pop

Lars Winnerbäck chronology
Med solen i ögonen (1997)	Kom (1999)	Singel (2001)

Kom is the fourth studio album by the Swedish singer-songwriter Lars Winnerbäck, released in 1999. "Kom ihåg mig då" and "Söndag 13.3.99" were released as singles. Winnerbäck later won a Grammis for "Best songwriter" for the album.

== Track listing ==
1. "Kom", Come
2. "Kom ihåg mig", Remember Me
3. "I Stockholm", In Stockholm
4. "Du får mig", You Can Have Me
5. "Du gamla fria nord" (Original by Ani DiFranco)
6. "Måste vara två", Got to Be Two
7. "Aldrig riktigt slut", Never Really Over
8. "Hugger i sten", Go Wide of the Mark
9. "Söndag 13.3.99", Sunday 13.3.99
10. "Tanken som räknas", It's the Thought That Counts
11. "Nästan perfekt", Almost Perfect
12. "Fria vägar ut", Free Ways Out

== Charts ==
Chart (1999)	Peak position
Sweden (Sverigetopplistan)	11
