= Daugavpils hydroelectric power station =

Proposed hydroelectric power station in Daugavpils, Latvia

- Location within Latvia
- Country: Latvia
- Location: Daugavpils
- Coordinates: 55°52′17″N 26°37′30″E
- Status: Cancelled
- Owner: Latvenergo

Power Station
- Type: Conventional
- Turbines: 10
- Installed capacity: 300 MW

The Daugavpils hydroelectric power station was a proposed hydro power project in Daugavpils, Latvia. It was to have 10 individual turbines with a nominal output of around 30 MW which were to deliver up to 300 MW of power.

The proposed dam became the rallying point for protest in 1986–87 by hundreds of thousands of Latvians resulting with the cancellation of the project, in spite of the vast expenditures already poured into the project. The protest was a precursor of the Latvian Third Awakening.

== See also ==
- Pļaviņas Hydroelectric Power Station
