= Dans med svåra steg =

Studio album by Lars Winnerbäck
- Released: 1996
- Recorded: 1996
- Genre: Pop
- Length: 47:03
- Producer: Lars Winnerbäck, P H Andersson

Lars Winnerbäck chronology
Dans med svåra steg (1996)	Rusningstrafik (1997)

Dans med svåra steg is the debut studio album by Swedish singer-songwriter Lars Winnerbäck, released in 1996. It has been certified gold in Sweden.

== Track listing ==
1. "Tretton trappor opp" – 3:46 – 13 Floors Up
2. "Eldvakt" – 2:48 – Fire Watcher
3. "Av ingens frö" – 3:45 – By No One's Seed
4. "Fröken Svår" – 1:26 – Miss Difficult
5. "Under månen" – 5:14 – Under the Moon
6. "Tal av Hjärter Dam" – 2:22 – Speech from the Queen of Hearts
7. "Kom änglar" – 4:13 – Come Angels
8. "Julgröten" – 5:16 – The Christmas Porridge
9. "Sagan om en fantasi" – 3:59 – The Tale About a Fantasy
10. "Vårdag i november" – 4:02 – Spring Day in November
11. "Försvarstal" – 3:28 – Defense Speech
12. "Inte för kärleks skull" – 4:42 – Not for the Sake of Love
13. "Fenomena" – 4:02 – Phenomenon

== Personnel ==
- Lars Winnerbäck – vocals, acoustic guitar
- P H Andersson – violin, recorder, electric guitar, acoustic guitar, backing vocals
- Kalle Tagesson – piano
- Martin Söderström – bass guitar
- Johan Aronsson – drums, percussion
- Rikard Favati – acoustic guitar (Av ingens frö)
- Susanna Carlstedt – vocals (Av ingens frö)
