= Neutronstjärnan =

Studio album by Lars Winnerbäck
- Released: 22 September 2023
- Studios: Hamsterdam Studios (Sweden); Propeller Studios (Norway); Baggpipe Studios (Sweden)
- Genre: Pop rock
- Length: 46:45
- Label: Universal
- Producers: Joakim Berg, Martin Sköld

Lars Winnerbäck chronology
Själ och hjärta (2022)	Neutronstjärnan (2023)

Singles from Neutronstjärnan
- 1. "Nåt som verkligen är bra" 2. "Är det nåt jag ska ta med"

Professional ratings
Review scores
Source	Rating
Aftonbladet	4/5 stars
Gaffa	4/6 stars

Neutronstjärnan is the fourteenth studio album by Swedish singer-songwriter Lars Winnerbäck. It was released on 22 September 2023. The album is a collaboration with Joakim Berg and Martin Sköld from Kent.

== Track listing ==
All lyrics are written by Lars Winnerbäck; all music is composed by Lars Winnerbäck.

Neutronstjärnan track listing
No.	Title	Length
1.	"Min gata i stan" (My Street in Town)	6:37
2.	"Är det nåt jag ska ta med" (Is There Something I Should Bring)	3:51
3.	"Nåt som verkligen är bra" (Something That Is Really Good)	4:56
4.	"Alltid nästan där" (Always Almost There)	3:50
5.	"En lampa i mässing" (A Lamp in Brass)	4:16
6.	"Vad gör det om hundra år" (What Will It Do in A Hundred Years)	3:23
7.	"Rosor & champagne" (Roses & Champagne)	4:08
8.	"Gärna lite till" (Preferably A Little More)	4:29
9.	"Neutronstjärnan" (The Neutron Star)	4:48
10.	"Vår tid" (Our Time)	6:23

== Personnel ==
Lars Winnerbäck

- Lars Winnerbäck – music, lyrics, vocals, guitar

Additional musicians

- Joakim Berg – vocals, guitar, keyboards
- Martin Sköld – bass, keyboards
- Sandra Widman – vocals
- Erlend Ropstad – piano on track 3

Technical

- Joakim Berg – producer, recording
- Martin Sköld – producer, recording
- Michael Ilbert – mixing
- Björn Engelmann – mastering
- Michael Hartung – recording

Artwork

- Anders Thessing – photography
- Henrik Walse – cover

== Charts ==
=== Weekly charts ===
Weekly chart performance for Neutronstjärnan
Chart (2023)	Peak position
Norwegian Albums (VG-lista)	38
Swedish Albums (Sverigetopplistan)	1

=== Year-end charts ===
Year-end chart performance for Neutronstjärnan
Chart	Year	Position
Swedish Albums (Sverigetopplistan)	2023	17
Swedish Albums (Sverigetopplistan)	2024	28
