= Hovet Church =

Church in Buskerud, Norway

- Hovet kirke
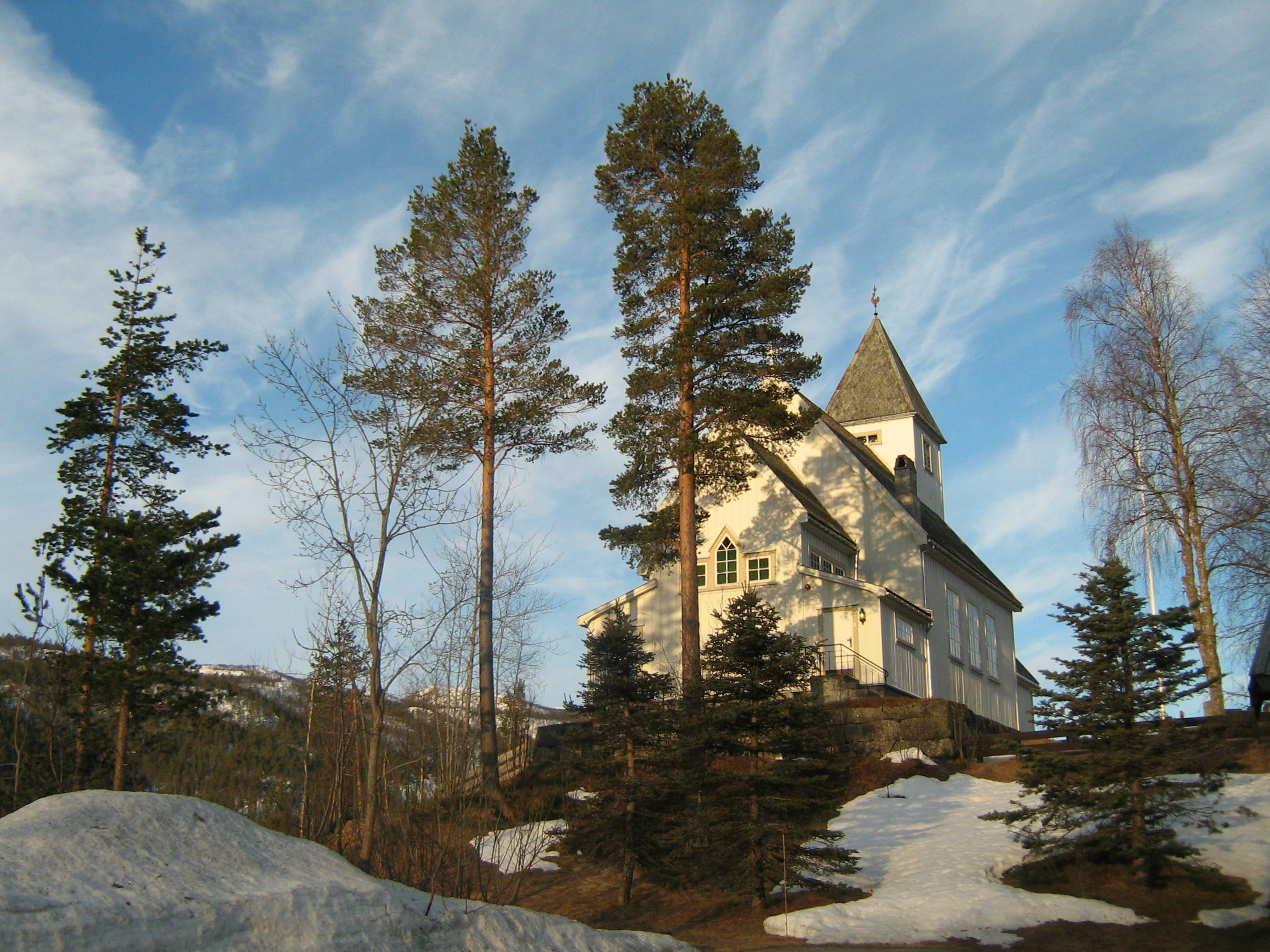
- View of the church
- Hovet Church
- 60°37′22″N 8°09′27″E
- Location: Hol, Buskerud
- Country: Norway
- Denomination: Church of Norway
- Churchmanship: Evangelical Lutheran

History
- Status: Parish church
- Founded: 1910
- Consecrated: 18 Oct 1910

Architecture
- Functional status: Active
- Architect: Ola Steen
- Architectural type: Long church
- Completed: 1910 (116 years ago)

Specifications
- Capacity: 200
- Materials: Wood

Administration
- Diocese: Tunsberg
- Deanery: Hallingdal prosti
- Parish: Hol og Hovet
- Norwegian Cultural Heritage Site
- Type: Church
- Status: Listed
- ID: 84647

Hovet Church (Norwegian: Hovet kirke) is a parish church of the Church of Norway in Hol Municipality in Buskerud county, Norway. It is located in the village of Hovet. It is one of the churches for the Hol og Hovin parish which is part of the Hallingdal prosti (deanery) in the Diocese of Tunsberg. The white, wooden church was built in a long church design in 1910 using plans drawn up by the architect Ola Steen. The church seats about 200 people.

== History ==
In the early 1890s, a new cemetery was created in Hovet. Nearly 20 years later, in 1910, a new chapel was built at the cemetery. The chapel was designed by Ole Steen and built by master builder Kristian Ødegaard from Haug. The new building was consecrated on 18 October 1910. It is a wooden long church. The nave is relatively short, the choir is narrow and rectangular, and the choir is surrounded by sacristies to the north and south. The west tower is set back somewhat into the nave, and there is a church porch at the western entrance. Historically, this was called Hovet Chapel, but more recently it has been called Hovet Church.

== See also ==
- List of churches in Tunsberg
