= Kjell Höglund =

Swedish singer-songwriter (born 1945)

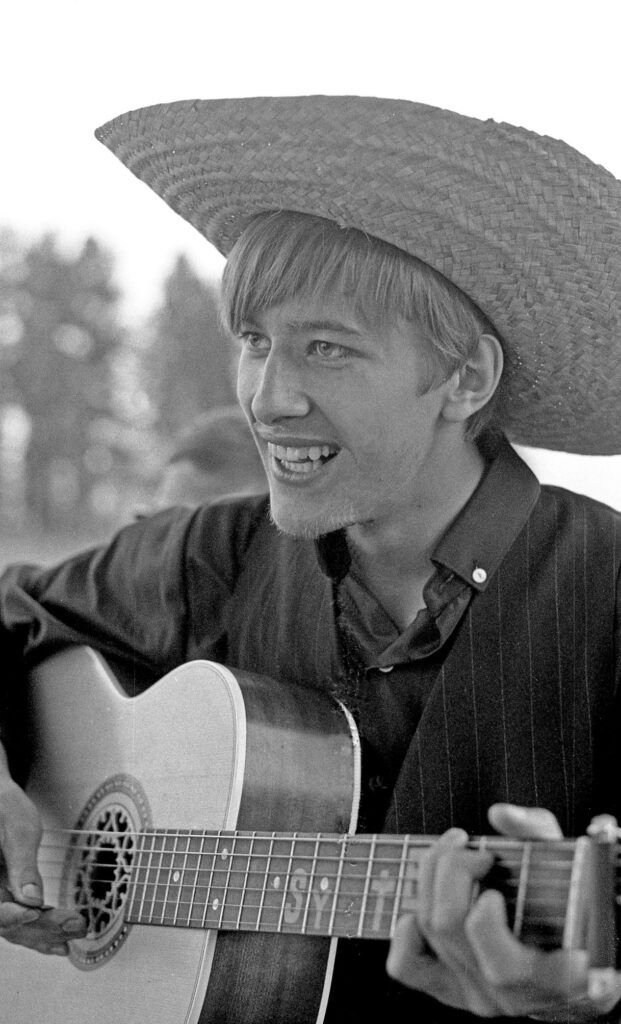
- Höglund in 1966

Background information
- Born: Kjell Örjan Höglund; 8 December 1945 (age 80); Östersund, Sweden
- Occupation: singer-songwriter
- Years active: 1965–present

Kjell Höglund (born 8 December 1945 in Östersund, Sweden) is a Swedish singer-songwriter.

Höglund, who found his musical breakthrough in the 1970s, is in his native country renowned for his mixture of realism, absurdism and surrealism in his lyrics. He made 14 albums between 1971 and 2006, in addition to the two album collections Glöd (1988) and Lokomotiv (1994).

In 1992 he was nominated for a Grammis award for best male pop.

Kjell Höglund has also published books with esoteric and pseudo-scientific content. Many of Höglund's beliefs presented in these works are similar to those of the Danish new age mystic Martinus.

== Selected songs ==
- Jag hör hur dom ligger med varandra i våningen ovanför (Translation of title: I can hear them sleeping with each other in the flat above)
- Genesarets sjö (Translation of title: Lake of Gennesaret)
- Man vänjer sig (Translation of title: One gets used to it)
- Holländsk Genever (Translation of title: Dutch Gin)
- Häxprocess (Translation of title: Witch process)
- Desertör (Translation of title: Deserter)
- Maskinerna är våra vänner (Translation of title: The machines are our friends)

== Selected albums ==
- Undran (1971)
- Blomstertid (1972)
- Häxprocess (1973)
- Inkognito (1995)
- Kryptonit (2001)
- Pandoras ask (2006)
- Baskervilles hund ALP-4 (1974)
- Hjärtat sitter till vänster ALP-7 (1975)
- Doktor Jekylls testamente ALP-11 (1979)
- Vägen mot Shangri-La ALP-12 (1980)
- Tidens tecken ALP-15/AMC-15/ACD-15 (1984)
- Hemlig kärlek ALP-16/AMC-16 (1986)
- Ormens år ALPCD-18 (1989)
- Höglund Forever ALP-22/ACD-22 (1992)
- Inkognito ACD-26 (1995)
- Glöd ALP-17/ACD-17 (1988)
- Lokomotiv ACD-23 (1994)

== Bibliography ==
- Brända skepp (1987)
- Magnum Opus (1991)
- Det sicilianska sigillet (1997)
- Genomträngningen (1999)
- Den förbjudna boken: en ny teori om Nostradamus profetior (2000)
- Det snöar i Edens lustgård (2005)
- Ando-Random Haglund (2013)
