= Söndermarken =

Studio album by Lars Winnerbäck och Hovet
- Released: 2003
- Length: 43:29
- Label: Universal Music

Lars Winnerbäck och Hovet chronology
...Live för dig! (2001)	Söndermarken (2003)	Vatten under broarna (2004)

Söndermarken is the sixth studio album by Lars Winnerbäck and the first by his band Hovet, released in 2003 through Universal Music. It has been certified platinum in Sweden.

== Track listing ==
All tracks are written by Lars Winnerbäck.

Söndermarken track listing
No.	Title	Length
1.	"Faller"	4:49
2.	"Åt samma håll"	4:40
3.	"Min Älskling Har Ett Hjärta Av Snö"	3:06
4.	"Över gränsen"	3:38
5.	"Dunkla rum"	4:06
6.	"Brustna hjärtans röst"	4:34
7.	"Lång väg hem"	4:38
8.	"Dom sista drömmarna"	3:34
9.	"Timglas"	4:22
10.	"Söndermarken"	5:59
Total length:		43:29

== Charts ==
=== Weekly charts ===
Chart (2003–2004)	Peak position	Certification
Swedish Albums (Sverigetopplistan)	1	GLF: Platinum

=== Year-end charts ===
Chart (2003)	Position
Swedish Albums (Sverigetopplistan)	6
Chart (2004)	Position
Swedish Albums (Sverigetopplistan)	53
Chart (2005)	Position
Swedish Albums (Sverigetopplistan)	97
