= Hosianna (album) =

Studio album by Lars Winnerbäck
- Released: 18 September 2013
- Studio: Grouse Lodge Studios (Ireland); Decibel Studios (Sweden)
- Genre: Pop rock
- Label: Universal
- Producer: Lars Winnerbäck, Jerker Odelholm

Lars Winnerbäck chronology
Tänk om jag ångrar mig och sen ångrar mig igen (2009)	Hosianna (2013)	Granit och morän (2016)

Singles from Hosianna
- 1. "Utkast till ett brev"

Hosianna is the tenth studio album by Swedish singer-songwriter Lars Winnerbäck. It was released on 18 September 2013.

== Commercial performance ==
The album topped the Swedish Albums Chart in its first week of release. It also reached number three on VG-lista, the official Norwegian Albums Chart.

== Track listing ==
All lyrics are written by Lars Winnerbäck; all music is composed by Lars Winnerbäck

Hosianna track listing
No.	Title	Length
1.	"Vi åkte aldrig ut till havet" (We Never Went Out To Sea)	4:44
2.	"Gå med mig vart jag går" (Go With Me Where I Go)	4:09
3.	"Monsterteorin" (The Monster Theory)	4:43
4.	"Vem som helst blues" (Anyone Blues)	4:53
5.	"Det gick inte" (It Didn't Work)	3:02
6.	"Skolklockan" (The School Clock)	4:50
7.	"Utkast till ett brev" (Draft of a Letter)	4:38
8.	"Ett slags liv" (A Kind of Life)	4:49
9.	"När det blåser från ditt håll" (When The Wind Blows From Your Direction)	4:02
10.	"Hosianna" (Hosanna)	7:10

== Personnel ==
=== Lars Winnerbäck ===
- Lars Winnerbäck – music, lyrics, vocals, guitar, harmonica

=== Additional musicians ===
- Joakim Thåström – vocals on track 2
- Jerker Odelholm – bass
- Ola Nyström – guitar
- Mattias Blomdahl – guitar, choir
- Anders Boba Lindström – piano, choir
- David Nyström – piano, choir
- Robert Eriksson – drums, percussion
- Annika Granlund – choir, trumpet
- Sara Isaksson – choir
- Johan Persson – choir

=== Technical ===
- Lars Winnerbäck – producer
- Jerker Odelholm – producer
- Ronny Lahti – mixing, recording
- Henrik Jonsson – mastering

== Charts ==
=== Weekly charts ===
Chart (2013)	Peak position
Norwegian Albums (VG-lista)	3
Swedish Albums (Sverigetopplistan)	1

=== Year-end charts ===
Chart (2013)	Position
Swedish Albums (Sverigetopplistan)	7
Chart (2014)	Position
Swedish Albums (Sverigetopplistan)	55
