= Efter nattens bränder =

Compilation album by Lars Winnerbäck
- Released: 2006
- Recorded: 1996–2006

Lars Winnerbäck chronology
Bränt krut vol. 2 (2005)	Efter nattens bränder (2006)	Daugava (2007)

Efter nattens bränder is a double CD compilation album released in 2006 by Lars Winnerbäck. The album contains work from 1996 to 2006 as well as two new songs, "Stockholms kyss" and "Ingen soldat". There was also a limited edition containing a booklet with Winnerbäck's biography.

== Track listing ==
=== CD 1 ===
1. "Stockholms kyss"
2. "Elden"
3. "Åt samma håll"
4. "Kom ihåg mig"
5. "Stort liv"
6. "I Stockholm"
7. "Dunkla rum"
8. "Gråa dagar"
9. "Där elden falnar (men fortfarande glöder)"
10. "Nån annan"
11. "Jag vill gå hem med dig"
12. "Min älskling har ett hjärta av snö"
13. "Solen i ögonen"

=== CD 2 ===
1. "Elegi"
2. "Hugger i sten"
3. "Kom änglar"
4. "Hjärter Dams sista sång"
5. "Söndermarken"
6. "För dig" (Studiorecording)
7. "Varning för ras"
8. "Stackars"
9. "Tvivel"
10. "Du hade tid" (Live recording)
11. "Över gränsen"
12. "Av ingens frö"
13. "Ingen soldat"

== Charts ==
=== Weekly charts ===
Chart (2006)	Peak position
Swedish Albums (Sverigetopplistan)	1

=== Year-end charts ===
Chart (2006)	Position
Swedish Albums (Sverigetopplistan)	2
Chart (2007)	Position
Swedish Albums (Sverigetopplistan)	51
