= Tänk om jag ångrar mig och sen ångrar mig igen =

Studio album by Lars Winnerbäck
- Released: 18 September 2009
- Studio: Grouse Lodge Studios
- Label: Universal Music

Lars Winnerbäck chronology
| Daugava (2007) | Tänk om jag ångrar mig och sen ångrar mig igen (2009) | Utanför (2012) |

Professional ratings
Review scores
| Source | Rating |
|---|---|
| Expressen | 3/5 stars |
| Gefle Dagblad | 3/5 stars |

Tänk om jag ångrar mig, och sen ångrar mig igen is the ninth studio album by Swedish singer Lars Winnerbäck, released on 18 September 2009. The album topped Sverigetopplistan and also reached number 6 on VG-lista, the Norwegian Albums Chart. The album also placed at number 3 on the Swedish Year-end Album Chart of 2009 and was certified platinum in Sweden. Winnerbäck won a Grammis Award for "Best Male Pop/Rock" male artist in 2010 for Tänk om jag ångrar mig och sen ångrar mig igen.

== Track listing ==
1. "Järnvägsspår"
2. "Kedjebrev"
3. "Ett sällsynt exemplar"
4. "Du som reser mig"
5. "Du, min vän i livet"
6. "Jag får liksom ingen ordning"
7. "Jag fattar alltihop"
8. "Köpenhamn och överallt"
9. "Fribiljett mot himlen"
10. "Berätta hur du gör"

== Personnel ==
- Lars Winnerbäck - vocals, guitar
- Ola Gustafsson - Guitar
- Jerker Odelholm - Bass, synthbas
- Johan Persson - Synthesizer, piano, guitar, vocals
- Anna Stadling - vocals, tambourin
- Anders Hernestam - drums, percussion, tambourin
- Anders Nygårds - violin, viola
- Malin-My Wall - violin
- Johanna Dahl - cello

== Charts ==
=== Weekly charts ===
| Chart (2009–2012) | Peak position | Certification |
|---|---|---|
| Norwegian Albums (VG-lista) | 6 | |
| Swedish Albums (Sverigetopplistan) | 1 | GLF: Platinum |

=== Year-end charts ===
| Chart (2009) | Position |
|---|---|
| Sweden (Sverigetopplistan) | 3 |
