= ...Live för dig! =

Live – För Dig

Live album by Lars Winnerbäck
- Released: 2001
- Genres: Pop, rock
- Label: Sonet/Universal

Lars Winnerbäck chronology
Bland skurkar, helgon och vanligt folk (1999)	Live – För Dig (2001)	Stackars hela Sverige: Bränt krut vol. 1 (2005)

Singles from Live – För dig
- 1. "För dig" Released: September 2001

Live – För dig is a live album from 2001 by the Swedish musician Lars Winnerbäck. In addition to the live recordings, the album contains the new song, "För dig", which was released as a single in September 2001.

== Track listing ==
1. Elden
2. I Stockholm
3. Gråa dagar
4. En svår och jobbig grej
5. Sen du var här
6. Nån annan
7. Hugger i sten
8. Varning för ras
9. Kom ihåg mig
10. Solen i ögonen
11. Du hade tid
12. Kom änglar
13. Röda laäppar
14. För dig

== Personnel ==
- Lars Winnerbäck – vocals, guitar
- Johan Persson – guitar, harmonica, backing vocals
- Idde Schultz – guitar, backing vocals
- Anna Stadling – guitar, backing vocals
- Josef Zackrisson – bass guitar, guitar, backing vocals
- Norpan Eriksson – drums, percussion
- Jens Back – piano, organ, saxophone
- Staffan Andersson – guitar, mandolin

== Charts ==
Chart performance for Live – För dig
Chart (2001)	Peak position
Swedish Albums (Sverigetopplistan)	21
