= Stångån =

Coordinates: 57.90349°N 15.78230°E

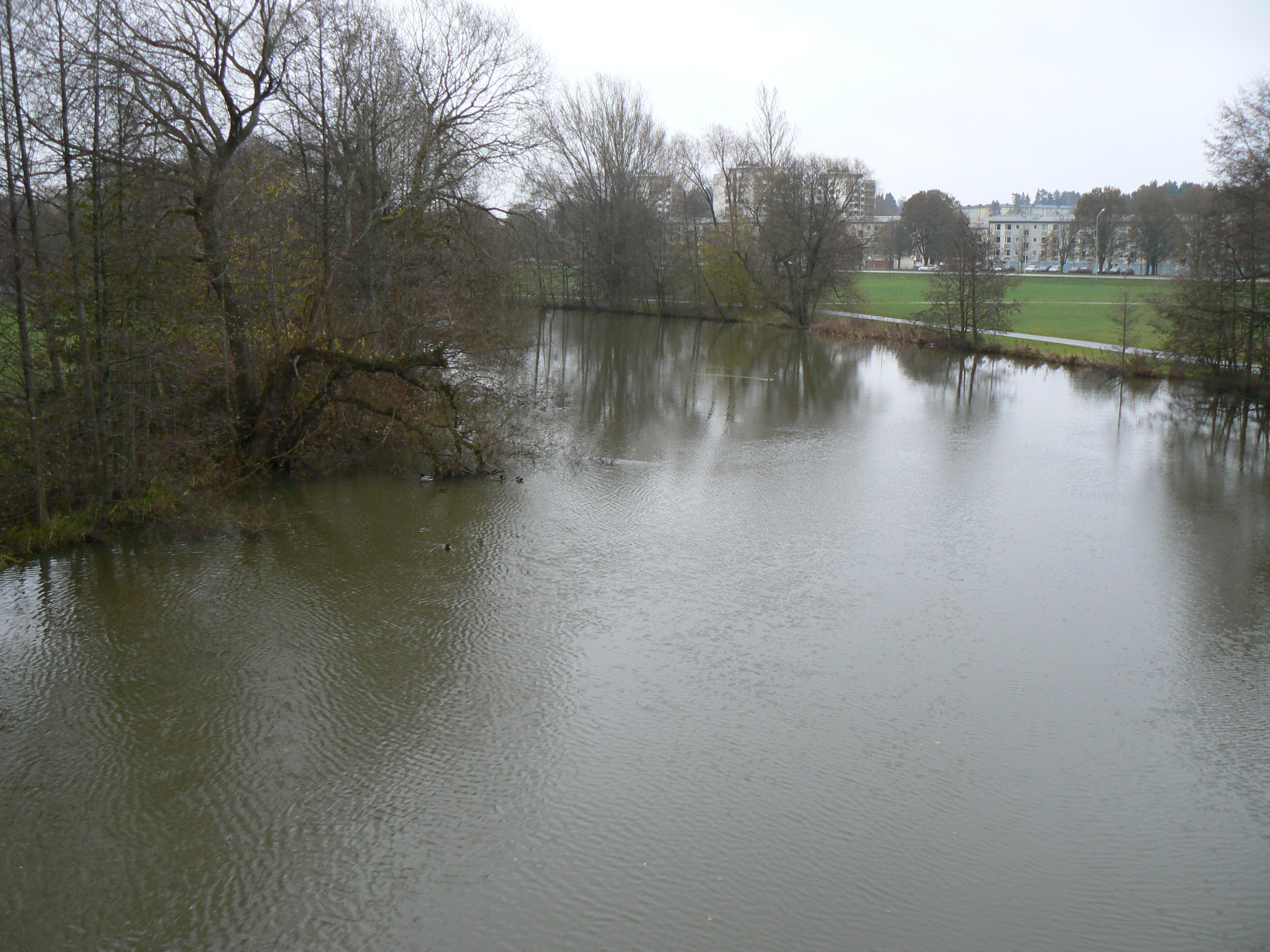
- Stångån in Linköping

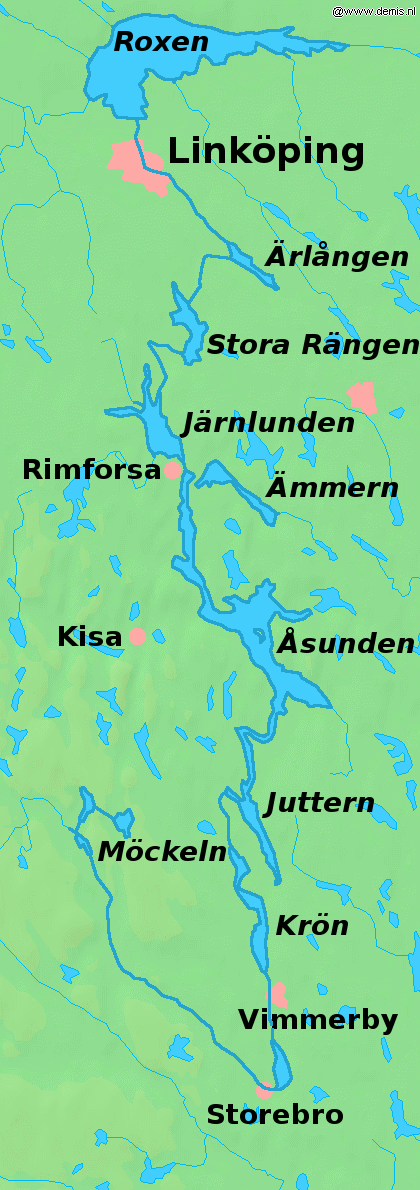

Location
- Country: Sweden

Physical characteristics
- Length: 185 km (115 mi)
- Basin size: 2,440 km^{2} (940 sq mi)
- Discharge
  - average: 15 m^{3}/s (530 cu ft/s)

Stångån is a small river in southern Sweden, 185 km long and with a drainage basin of 2440 km^{2}. It flows from the highlands of eastern Småland in the south to lake Roxen in the north. At the outlet near Linköping, the average discharge is 15 m^{3} per second.

It passes through Vimmerby, Kisa, and Linköping. A great deal of the river is extended to a canal, Kinda Canal. A railway takes the same course as the river.
