= Vatten under broarna =

Studio album by Lars Winnerbäck
- Released: 2004
- Length: 42:32

Lars Winnerbäck chronology
| Söndermarken (2003) | Vatten under broarna (2004) | Bränt krut Vol. 2 (2005) |

Vatten under broarna is the seventh studio album by Swedish singer-songwriter Lars Winnerbäck, released in 2004.

== Track listing ==
1. "Se dig om" – 3:16 - Look Around You
2. "Det är visst någon som är tillbaka" – 3:32 - Seems like Someone Is Back
3. "Elegi" – 4:38 - Elegy
4. "Jag är hos dig igen" – 3:55 - I'm with You Again
5. "Dom tomma stegen" – 4:57 - The Empty Steps
6. "Hjärter dams sista sång" – 3:55 - The Queen of Hearts' Final Song
7. "Stackars" – 3:22 - Poor
8. "Hon kommer från främmande vidder" – 4:14 - She Comes from Foreign Plains
9. "Dom sista drömmarna del II" – 3:53 - The Final Dreams Part II
10. "Mareld" – 6:50

== Charts ==
| Chart (2004) | Peak position |
|---|---|
| Sweden (Sverigetopplistan) | 1 |
