= Johan Johansson (musician) =

Swedish writer and musician (born 1961)

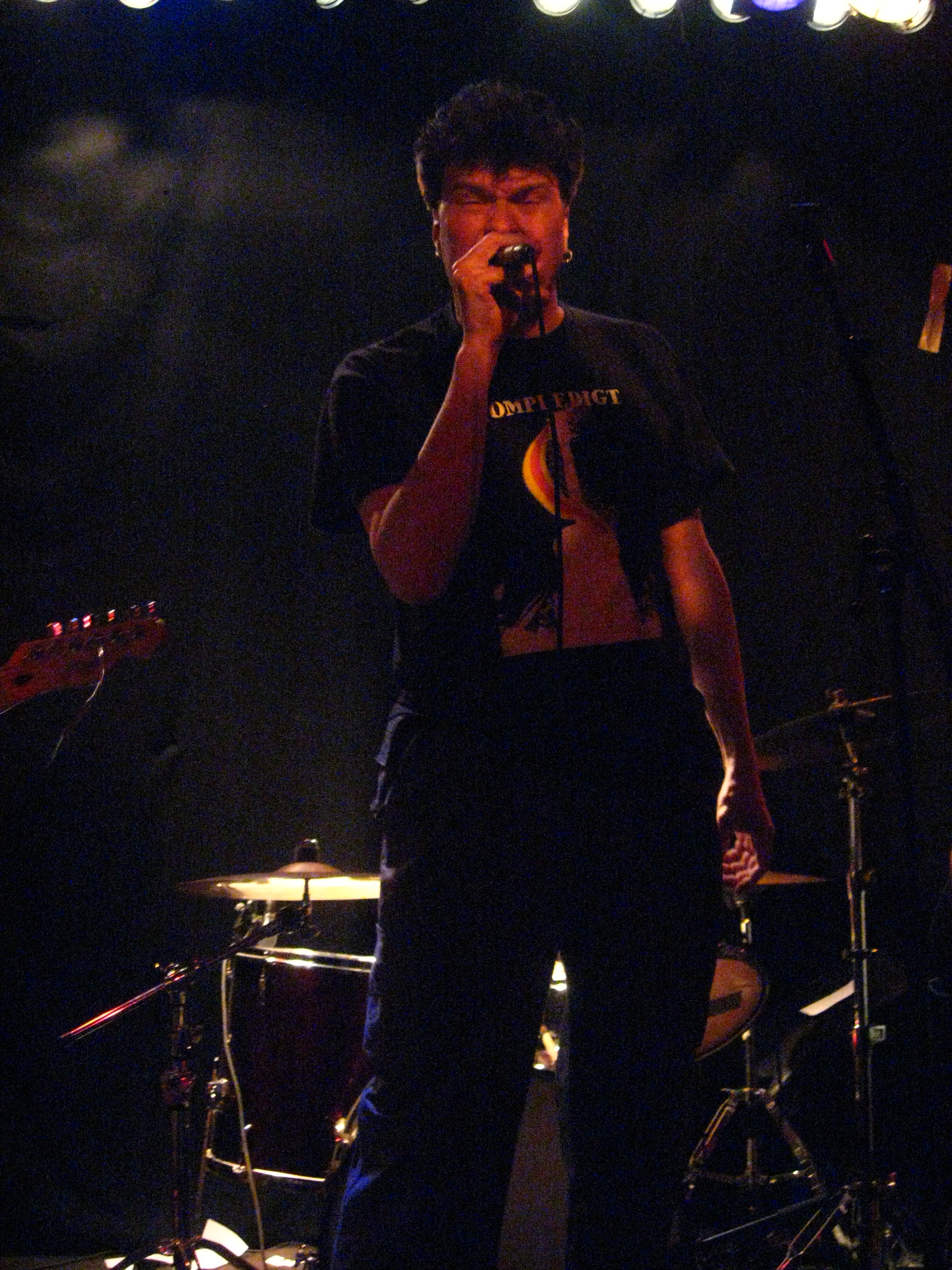
- Johan Johansson sings with Monark X, May 2010

Background information
- Born: Johan Georg Johansson; 23 April 1961 (age 65)
- Genres: Rock; punk
- Occupations: Singer
- Instruments: Guitar; drums; bass
- Years active: 1977-2018
- Website: Johan Johanssons andra webbplats

Johan Georg Johansson (born April 23, 1961 in Stockholm, Sweden) is a writer and musician (drums, guitar, bass) in addition to being a vocalist. He is most famous for when he was a songwriter and drummer for the Swedish punk-rock band KSMB.

== Biography ==
In 2008, Johansson was awarded the Svenska Vispriset, an annual prize awarded to a person or organization for developing and furthering the art of folk singing, by Riksförbundet Visan i Sverige.

He and his family moved from Hornsgatan to Hagsätra during 1961, the year he was born. In 1970, he moved to Skärholmen in Stockholm. Johansson and the writer Nina Lekander have a son, Frans.

== Music ==
A first band Ingenting (means "nothing" in Swedish), was formed 1974 and played covers of song by bands including The Who and Iggy & the Stooges. In 1977, the band Skärholmens Gymnasiums Punkensemble began. It changed names and later became KSMB. Since the band was not that known, in the beginning they played at local clubs in Skärholmen.

During the year KSMB split up (1982), Johansson and Janne Borgh formed a band Strindberg. Strindberg only played a couple of years until 1985. Johansson then began a band called John Lennon (which later changed its name to John Lenin, to get away from Yoko Ono's lawyers). In the 1990s, his music went in a different direction and his sound became more like Cornelis Vreeswijk. In 2006, a solo album was released 10 years after the last, the album came out with the book I stället för vykort. The record contained a live-show with old and new material.

== Writing ==
Johansson published two books, a travel book, I stället för vykort (2006), and Wild Cards (2008) about festivals, in particular, Storsjöyran in Östersund, Sweden.

== Discography ==
KSMB

- 1980 - "Bakverk 80"
- 1980 - "Aktion"
- 1981 - "Rika Barn Leka Bäst"
- 1982 - "Dé É Förmycké" (live)

Strindbergs

- 1983 - "Bibeln"
- 1984 - "Med Strindbergs Ur Tiden"
- 1984 - "Bombpartyt"

John Lenin

- 1987 - "Peace For Presidents"

Johan Johansson

- 1993 - Flum
- 1994 - 10 (EP)
- 1996 - ...och hans lilla svarta värld
- 2001 - Sånger ur Trähatten 1982-2000
- 2006 - Ett kompledigt liv (Livealbum)
- 2008 - Vän av ordning (EP)
- 2011 - "Svea Rike Rivjärn"
