= Daugava (album) =

Studio album by Lars Winnerbäck
- Released: September 26, 2007
- Recorded: Westmeath, Ireland 2007
- Label: Universal

Lars Winnerbäck chronology
Efter nattens bränder (2006)	Daugava (2007)	Bränt krut vol. 3 (2008)

Daugava is the eighth studio album by Lars Winnerbäck. It was recorded in Ireland, and released on September 26, 2007. The name comes from the river that runs through Riga.

The album has sold in excess of 80,000 copies in Sweden, and has been certified 2× platinum.

== Track listing ==
1. "Farväl Jupiter", Farewell Jupiter
2. "Jag har väntat på ett regn", I've Been Waiting for a Rainfall
3. "Innan mörkret faller", Before Darkness Falls
4. "Om du lämnade mig nu" (duet with Miss Li), If You Left Me Now
5. "En tätort på en slätt", A Town on a Plain
6. "Och det blåser genom hallen", And Wind is Blowing Through the Hall
7. "Min helande tröst", My Healing Solace
8. "Jag fattar ingenting", I Don't Get Anything
9. "Vad är det som bekymrar Sara Wehn", What's Troubling Sara Wehn
10. "Kom hem nu", Come Home Now
11. "Gå på vatten", Walk on Water
12. "Tidvis", From Time to Time

== Charts ==
=== Weekly charts ===
Chart (2007–2008)	Peak position
Norwegian Albums (VG-lista)	34
Swedish Albums (Sverigetopplistan)	1

=== Year-end charts ===
Chart (2007)	Position
Swedish Albums (Sverigetopplistan)	4
Chart (2008)	Position
Swedish Albums (Sverigetopplistan)	29
Chart (2009)	Position
Swedish Albums (Sverigetopplistan)	83
