= Lars Winnerbäck =

Swedish singer and songwriter (born 1975)

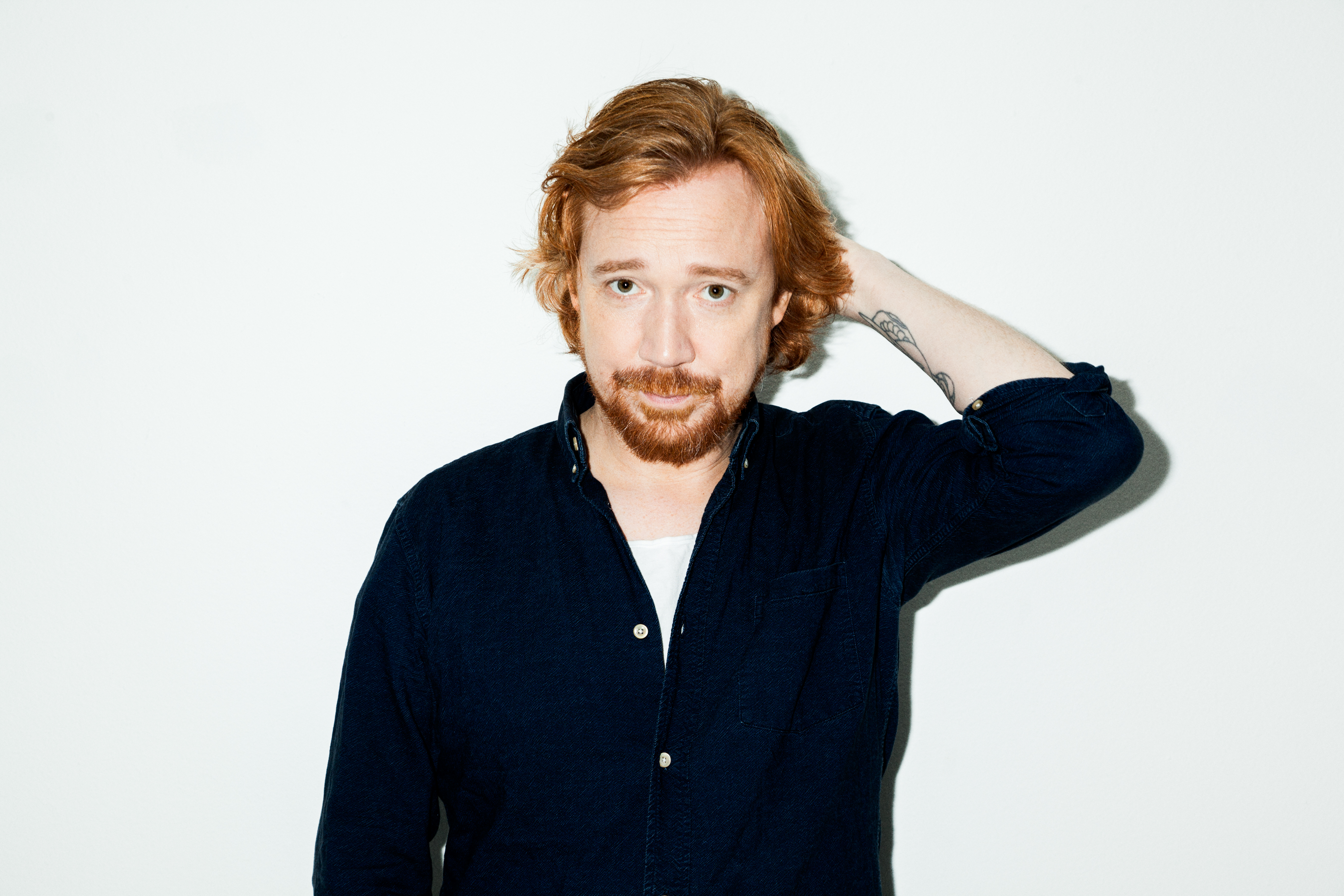
- Winnerbäck in 2016.

Background information
- Also known as: Lasse
- Born: Lars Mattias Nilsson; 19 October 1975 (age 50)
- Origin: Stockholm, Sweden
- Genres: Pop, Rock, Folk, Acoustic
- Occupations: Musician, songwriter
- Instrument: Guitar
- Years active: 1994–present
- Label: Universal
- Website: Official Facebook page

Lars Mattias Winnerbäck (born 19 October 1975) is a Swedish singer and songwriter. He was born in Stockholm but spent his childhood in Vidingsjö, Linköping, where he attended Katedralskolan. He moved back to Stockholm in 1996, the same year he released his first album, Dans med svåra steg. He is now one of Sweden's most popular artists.

The influence of songwriters like Carl Michael Bellman, Evert Taube, Bob Dylan, Ulf Lundell and Cornelis Vreeswijk shines through in Winnerbäck's exclusively Swedish lyrics, which deal with shallowness, prejudice in society, as well as romance, relationships and anxiety. Several songs depict the difference between living in small town Linköping and the capital Stockholm.

His vinyl records were re-released in October 2011, many of them charting again on the Sverigetopplistan, the official Swedish Albums Chart.

Winnerbäck has been the subject of two full-length documentary films, Solen i ögonen – En film om Lars Winnerbäck (2008, directed by Magnus Gertten) and Winnerbäck - Ett slags liv (2017, directed by Øystein Karlsen).

== Discography ==
=== Studio albums ===
- Dans med svåra steg (1996)
- Rusningstrafik (1997)
- Med solen i ögonen (1998)
- Kom (1999)
- Singel (2001)
- Söndermarken (2003)
- Vatten under broarna (2004)
- Daugava (2007)
- Tänk om jag ångrar mig och sen ångrar mig igen (2009)
- Hosianna (2013)
- Granit och morän (2016)
- Eldtuppen (2019)
- Själ och hjärta (2022)
- Neutronstjärnan (2023)
- Längtan till våren (2026)

=== Compilations and live albums ===
- Bland skurkar, helgon och vanligt folk (1999)
- ...Live för dig! (2001)
- Stackars hela Sverige: Bränt krut vol. 1 (2005)
- Bränt krut vol. 2 (2005)
- Efter nattens bränder (2006)
- Vi var där blixten hittade ner – Bränt krut vol. 3 (2008)
- Over Grensen – De Beste 1996–2009 (2009)
- Lars Winnerbäck Globen 2019.11.29 (2020)

=== DVD ===
- Live i Linköping (Live)
- Solen i Ögonen (Documentary)
- Ett slags liv (Documentary)

== Awards ==
- 1999
  - Grammis – Best Songwriter
- 2001
  - Grammis – Best Male Pop/Rock
- 2004
  - Rockbjörn – Best Male Performer
  - Grammis – Best Rock album (solo)
  - Grammis – Best Songwriter
- 2005
  - P3 Guldmicken – Best Live act
- 2006
  - P3 Guldmicken – Best Live act
  - STIMs platinagitarr
  - Rockbjörn – Best Male Performer
- 2007
  - Grammis – Song of the Year, "Om du lämnade mig nu"
  - P3 Guld – Best Male Performer
  - Rockbjörn – Best Male Performer
  - Rockbjörn – Song of the Year, "Om du lämnade mig nu"
- 2009
  - Evert Taube-stipendiet
- 2010
  - Grammis – Best Performer
  - Grammis – Best Male Performer
  - P3 Guld – Best Performer
  - P3 Guldmicken – Best Live Act
