= Rugby League (video game series) =

- Genre: Sports game
- Developers: Sidhe Interactive, Wicked Witch Software,
- Publisher: Tru Blu Entertainment
- Platforms: Current: PlayStation 3, PlayStation 4, PlayStation 5, Xbox 360, Xbox One, Xbox Series X/S, Microsoft Windows, iOS, Android; Notable past systems: Nintendo DS, PlayStation 2, PlayStation Portable, Xbox, Wii
- Original release: 2003–present
- First release: Rugby League; 9 December 2003
- Latest release: Rugby League 26; 17 July 2025

Rugby League is a rugby league video game series developed by Sidhe Interactive, Wicked Witch Software, and Big Ant Studios. The first games was Rugby League, released on 9 December 2003. The latest game released was Rugby League 26, released on 17 July 2025 for PlayStation 5, PlayStation 4 and Xbox One.

== History ==
Prior to Tru Blu, there were a handful of Southern Hemisphere-focused rugby league video games:

- E.T.'s Rugby League (1992, Ozisoft, for Commodore 64) named after Andrew "ET" Ettingshausen
- Australian Rugby League (i-Space Interactive and EA Sports, 1995, for Mega Drive)
- ARL '96 in 1996 (Creative Assembly, EA Sports for PC CD-ROM)

The Rugby League franchise started in 2003 when Rugby League was released by Sidhe Interactive and Tru Blu Entertainment. This led to Rugby League 2 in late 2005 and the World Cup Edition (a content update of RL2) in 2008. In 2009, Wicked Witch Software released two off-series games on the Nintendo DS and PlayStation Portable and Rugby League 3 was released. Big Ant Studios in 2010 started releasing the Rugby League Live series in 2010. Rugby League Live 2 followed in 2012, again developed by Big Ant Studios.

On 31 May 2013, Tru Blu Entertainment announced Rugby League Live 2 would receive an update to the game, the 2013 season pack, developed by Melbourne's Big Ant Studios. It features an update to the 2013 season of rugby league; team Kits, roster updates, new 2013 competitions, new and updated stadiums, sponsors and a number of other features and improvements. The update was released on 19 June 2013, as DLC on PlayStation 3 and Xbox 360.

Wicked Witch Software created Rugby League Live 2 for iOS, which was released in 2013 and later on Android.

Rugby League Live 3 was released by Big Ant Studios in September 2015 on seventh-gen and eighth-gen consoles as well as Microsoft Windows.

On 9 May 2017, the NRL announced the latest title Rugby League Live 4 which was released on 28 October 2017.

In 2020, the NRL confirmed that a new Rugby League game is due for release in 2021.The game has since been delayed multiple times, the game is still in production with a currently unknown release date.

On 1 July 2024, Tru Blu Games announced that Rugby League Live 3 and Rugby League Live 4 would be removed off sale on all platforms due to their NRL license expiry. The Publisher stated that the servers would be kept back up.

On 13 June 2025, Big Ant Studios announced Rugby League 26 for release on 17 July 2025.

== List of games ==
Title	Release date	Console(s)	Developer(s)
Rugby League	9 December 2003	PlayStation 2, Xbox, Microsoft Windows	Sidhe Interactive
Rugby League 2	8 December 2005	PlayStation 2, Xbox, Microsoft Windows	Sidhe Interactive
Rugby League 2: World Cup Edition	6 November 2008	PlayStation 2	Sidhe Interactive
NRL Mascot Mania	2 July 2009	Nintendo DS	Wicked Witch Software
Rugby League Challenge	9 September 2009	PlayStation Portable	Wicked Witch Software
Rugby League 3	18 March 2010	Wii	Sidhe Interactive
Rugby League Live	27 August 2010	PlayStation 3, Xbox 360, Microsoft Windows	Big Ant Studios
Rugby League Live 2	9 October 2012	PlayStation 3, Xbox 360	Big Ant Studios
Rugby League Live 2: Gold Edition	20 September 2013	iOS, Android	Wicked Witch Software
Rugby League Live 3	10 September 2015	PlayStation 3, PlayStation 4, Xbox 360, Xbox One, Microsoft Windows	Big Ant Studios
Rugby League Live 4	20 July 2017	PlayStation 4, Xbox One, PC	Big Ant Studios
Rugby League Live 4 World Cup Edition	18 December 2017	PlayStation 4, Xbox One, PC	Big Ant Studios
Rugby League 26	17 July 2025	PlayStation 5, PlayStation 4, Xbox Series X/S, Xbox One, PC	Big Ant Studios

== See also ==
- Tru Blu Entertainment
