= Rugby Challenge 4 =

2020 video game

- Developer(s): Wicked Witch Software
- Publisher(s): Tru Blu Entertainment
- Series: Rugby Challenge
- Platform(s): Nintendo Switch, PlayStation 4, Microsoft Windows, Xbox One
- Release: July 16, 2020
- Genre(s): Sports
- Mode(s): Cooperative video game; multiplayer; single-player

Rugby Challenge 4 is a rugby union sports game, developed by Wicked Witch Software and published by Tru Blu Entertainment. It was the fourth game in the Rugby Challenge series. It is the sequel to Rugby Challenge 3.

Rugby Challenge 4 was the first game in the series to feature Women's Rugby Sevens with 16 international teams, 5 of were licensed teams. It also had a new team addition of the NSW Waratahs and added the SCG Stadium.

== Release ==
Rugby Challenge 4 is available digitally on PlayStation 4, Xbox One and Nintendo Switch. The physical retail version is also available for consoles.
