= Rugby Challenge 3 =

2016 video game

- New Zealand cover art featuring the All Blacks
- Developer: Wicked Witch Software
- Publisher: Tru Blu Entertainment
- Series: Rugby Challenge
- Platforms: PlayStation 4, PlayStation 3, Xbox One, Xbox 360, Microsoft Windows
- Release: PlayStation 3, PlayStation 4, Xbox 360, Xbox One: NZ: April 14, 2016; AU: April 22, 2016; Microsoft Windows: WW: June 24, 2016
- Genre: Sports
- Mode: Multiplayer; single-player

Rugby Challenge 3 is a rugby union simulation video game, developed by Wicked Witch Software and published by Tru Blu Entertainment. This is the third game in the Rugby Challenge series. It is the sequel to Rugby Challenge and Rugby Challenge 2, both of which were developed by Sidhe. Rugby Challenge 3 was released on PlayStation 4, Xbox One, PlayStation 3, Xbox 360 on April 14, 2016 in New Zealand, and in Australia on April 22, 2016. It was released for Microsoft Windows on June 24, 2016.

Rugby Challenge 3 is the first game in the series to include the seven-a-side variant of rugby union. It is also the first in the series to include a licence for SANZAR teams. However, it does not feature the Top 14 or The Pro12.

== Features ==
The features and content of Rugby Challenge 3 include:

- Updated graphics for the next-gen consoles.
- English language commentary from Grant Nisbett and Justin Marshall and French language commentary from Eric Bayle and Thomas Lombard.
- Full SANZAR licence, marking the first time in Rugby Challenge that the full official Super Rugby will be playable instead of the generic Super 15.

=== New features and game modes ===
- Rugby sevens
- Be a Pro Mode - join a club as a rookie player and work your way up over 13 seasons
- FanHub - Create, edit and share players
- Full official licences with New Zealand, Australia, South Africa and England national teams.
- Fully Licensed Super Rugby, as well as feeder competitions, including South Africa's Currie Cup, Australia's National Rugby Championship, and New Zealand's Mitre 10 Cup.
- Aviva Premiership will be licensed due to licensing with the Rugby Football Union

Stadiums: Rugby Challenge 3 will feature over 40 stadiums, including all 14 from New Zealand's Mitre 10 (formerly ITM) Cup.

== Info ==
The game was released in New Zealand on April 14, 2016, and in Australia on April 22, 2016. Rugby Challenge 3 was available on PlayStation 3, PlayStation 4, Xbox 360, Xbox One, and Microsoft Windows.

== Game modes ==
- Single Match
- Competition Mode
- Career Mode
- FanHub
- Be a Pro Mode
- Online Multi-Player Mode

=== Exceptions from previous games ===
Unlike the 1st and 2nd Rugby Challenge game, this version won't include the Top 14 and Pro12 tournaments due to the rights being licensed by Bigben Interactive.

=== Extensive customisation ===
As a tradition in Rugby Challenge titles, players will have the ability to extensively customise the players and teams and will be able to do so even more extensively this time with the new FanHub, where players can be uploaded to share with the community. A demo version of the FanHub for Windows was released on 28 July 2015 when the game was officially announced.
