= Rugby Challenge 2 =

2013 video game

Rugby Challenge 2: The Lions Edition
- Developer(s): Sidhe
- Publisher(s): Tru Blu Entertainment
- Platform(s): PlayStation 3, Xbox 360, Microsoft Windows
- Release: 13 June 2013
- Genre(s): Sports/Rugby Union
- Mode(s): Single-player, Multiplayer

Rugby Challenge 2: The Lions Tour Edition is a Rugby video game, developed by Sidhe and published by Tru Blu Entertainment. This game is the sequel to Rugby Challenge.

The game is titled All Blacks Rugby Challenge 2: The Lions Tour Edition in New Zealand, Wallabies Rugby Challenge 2: The Lions Tour Edition in Australia, Jonah Lomu Rugby Challenge 2 in France, and Rugby Challenge 2: The Lions Tour Edition for the rest of the world.

It was announced via the game's official Facebook account, and confirmed on the game website, that Rugby Challenge 2 would be released worldwide on 13 June 2013.

== Features ==
The features and content of Rugby Challenge 2: The Lions Tour Edition include:

- Play in Single Match Mode, multi-team Competition Mode, a vastly expanded multi-year Career Mode, Tutorial Mode, or compete in online multiplayer with support up to 4v4 via PlayStation Network, Xbox LIVE, or Steam
- Refined and expanded gameplay with the addition of quick taps, quick lineouts, mauls from lineouts, interceptions, contesting ball at the breakdown, removing players from the ruck, number 8 scrum pickups, and dynamic in game team strategies on both attack and defence
- 110+ teams and 50+ stadia from around the world featured including official team, competition, and special match licenses for the All Blacks, the Qantas Wallabies, the Georgia national team, the USA Eagles, Bledisloe Cup, British and Irish Lions 2013 Tour of Australia, Barbarians FC, Combined Country, Super Rugby teams, Aviva Premiership Rugby, TOP 14 Orange, Pro D2, RaboDirect PRO12, ITM Cup, and Ranfurly Shield
- More options to create or customise players, teams, and competitions, and change game rules and behaviour to shape the game to play how you want and keep the game fresh year after year
- Revamped sound and commentary systems, with real-time commentary from seasoned rugby commentators Grant Nisbett and former All Black turned commentator Justin Marshall, and French language commentary from Eric Bayle and Thomas Lombard.

=== New Gameplay Features ===
- Quick taps can now be selected if a penalty is called.
- Quick Lineouts can be selected if player catches the ball outside of playing area.
- There is now an option to create a maul from a lineout.
- Interceptions.
- Players can contest the ball at a ruck/breakdown.
- Players can be removed from a ruck/breakdown.
- Number 8's can now pick the ball up from a back of a scrum.
- In game strategies are now in the game.

== Game Modes ==
- Tutorial
- Exhibition Match
- 2013 Lions Tour of Australia
- Competition Mode
- Customisation Mode
- Career Mode
- Online Multi-Player (up to four players)

=== Extensive customisation ===
As a tradition in Rugby Challenge titles, players will have the ability to extensively customise the players, teams, and competitions, using the advanced customisation tools. The player will also be able to add players and teams to the game as desired.

== Reception ==
Rugby Challenge 2 received mixed to negative reviews from critics. The Digital Fix gave it 6/10, with Rob Kershaw criticising the poor licensing, repetitive cutscenes and dull commentary, but singled out the Career mode as a major improvement over the first game. NZGamer gave it 7.4/10, noting that it was better than the first game, but not enough to justify the length of time between the titles.
