= Module (musician) =

New Zealand musician

- Born: Jeramiah Ross
- Origin: Wellington, New Zealand
- Genres: Electro; downtempo; ambient; classical
- Occupation: Musician
- Instrument: Piano
- Years active: 2003–present
- Formerly of: Fly My Pretties

Module is the stage name of Wellington, New Zealand-based musician Jeramiah Ross. He composes and produces downtempo, ambient, and classical music, and he has published two studio albums as well as the soundtrack to the video game Shatter.

== History ==
Jeramiah Ross is a classically trained musician from Palmerston North, New Zealand, who performs under the name Module. He began playing the piano at age four and went on to tour as a professional musician in his 20s, mostly in Australia and Spain.

Module's debut album, Remarkable Engines, described as "broken-beat, electro, 80's rock and trip-hop" by Loop.co.nz, was released in 2006. It includes contributions from such artists as Paul McLaney and Rhian Sheehan. The song "What It Seems" was used as the theme music for Wellington's tourism campaign that year. Also in 2006, Ross joined the NZ musical collective Fly My Pretties. In 2009, he worked with Sidhe Interactive on sound design for the PlayStation 3 video game Shatter.

Module's follow-up album, Imagineering, blended ambient electronica with live instrumentation.

== Discography ==
- Remarkable Engines (2006)
- Shatter – The Official Video Game Soundtrack (2009)
- Imagineering (2012)
- The Best of Module (2003–2022) (2022)
