= Rugby League 26 =

2025 video game

- Australian cover art
- Developer: Big Ant Studios
- Publisher: Nacon
- Series: Rugby League
- Platforms: PlayStation 4; PlayStation 5; Xbox Series X; Xbox One; Nintendo Switch 2; PC
- Release: 17 July 2025; Nintendo Switch 2; June 5, 2026
- Genre: Sports
- Modes: Single-player, multiplayer

Rugby League 26 is a video game developed by Big Ant Studios and published by Nacon. It is part of the Rugby league video game series. The game was released on 17 July 2025, it was made available for PlayStation 4, PlayStation 5, Xbox Series X and Series S and on PC. A Nintendo Switch 2 version was announced to be released on June 5th, 2026.

The game was released in both Australia and the United Kingdom, featuring different cover athletes for each regional edition.

== Commentary ==
Australian Commentary is provided by Andrew Voss, who returns from previous installments in the series. He is joined by Cameron Smith, who contributes additional commentary. British commentary is done by Dave Woods and Brian Carney.

== Release ==
On 14 June 2025, the National Rugby League (NRL) announced that the game would launch on 17 July with the game having 'updated visuals' and 'better realism'. Eight years after the release of Rugby League Live 4 in 2017, Rugby League 26 was released to mostly negative reactions from both fans and professional NRL players. Upon launch users reported significant issues including login problems and gameplay bugs. Many players expressed their frustration on social media platforms. In response, the studio issued a public apology.

== Reaction ==
NRL Women's Premiership player Kennedy Cherrington vented frustration saying that the company could have done more and should have consulted with the Rugby League Players Association (RLPA).

It was reported that some of the issues regarding player likenesses came from availability when developers attended various clubs, with further scans to be scheduled. The RLPA also issued a statement asking that further "involvement and inclusion" was required. The NRL also attracted criticism for the role played by chairman Peter V'landys and his son in the testing of the game before release.

Reports indicated that the NRL expressed frustration with the game's release and explored the possibility of partnering with a new developer, specifically Electronic Arts, known for producing NFL and other major sports video games. However, with estimated development costs between $50–60 million, the NRL ultimately decided against the partnership and continued with Big Ant Studios.

Big Ant Studios CEO Ross Symons responded to the criticism and said that the demand for the game was six times higher than expected, suggesting that the game had outsold other video game franchises during its launch window.

The game gets frequent updates by BigAnt Studios.
