= Rugby Challenge =

Rugby Challenge may refer to:

- Rugby Challenge (South Africa), a South African rugby union competition established in 2017
- Rugby Challenge (video game), a video game released in 2011
