= Rugby League Live =

2010 video game

- PlayStation 3 cover art
- Developer(s): Big Ant Studios
- Publisher(s): Tru Blu Entertainment
- Series: Rugby League
- Engine: PhyreEngine
- Platform(s): PlayStation 3, Xbox 360, Microsoft Windows
- Release: PlayStation 3, Xbox 360^{NZ} August 27, 2010^{AU} September 2, 2010^{UK} November 5, 2010^{FR} November 5, 2010 Microsoft Windows February, 2011
- Genre(s): Sports
- Mode(s): Single player, multiplayer

Rugby League Live is a sports game based on Rugby league. It was released in Australia on September 2, New Zealand on August 27, and United Kingdom and France on November 5, 2010, for PlayStation 3 and Xbox 360. The Microsoft Windows port of game was released in February 2011.

Version 5 was rumored to be released in March, 2020, however this appears to have been delayed.

== Development ==
The title was developed by Australian company Big Ant Studios and published in Australia by Tru Blu Entertainment. Developers of the preceding title Sidhe Interactive stated on their online forum that they supported the new developers by providing commentary, stadium and motion capture data (which may or may not have been used) as well as QA testing. As with all preceding home console titles, former New Zealand Warrior captain Steve Price & St Helens R.F.C. Scrum-Half Kyle Eastmond feature on the covers, depending on which country the game is bought.

== Features ==
Key features of this installment include:

- Over 40 licensed teams from the NRL, Super League, State of Origin, City v Country, and World Cup.
- Four-player multiplayer and online head-to-head or co-op play.
- Over 30 realistic Stadiums modelled from real-life counterparts.
- "Bone crunching" tackles and impact camera replays.
- Clothing and environment degrade realistically.
- Replay mode with multiple angles and commentary by NRL commentator Andrew Voss.
- Custom player, team and competition creation.

== Reception ==
IGN gave it a 5/10 GameSpot gave it a 4/10.

== See also ==
- Rugby League (video game series)
