= Into the Dead 2 =

2017 video game

- Developer: PikPok
- Publishers: PikPok; Versus Evil; Gearbox Publishing
- Series: Into the Dead
- Platforms: iOS; Android; Nintendo Switch
- Release: iOS; AU: August 9, 2017; WW: October 13, 2017; Android; AU: August 29, 2017; WW: October 13, 2017; Switch; WW: October 25, 2019
- Genre: First person shooter
- Mode: Single-player

Into the Dead 2 is a 2017 first person shooter video game developed by PikPok. It was initially released on iOS and Android, and it was ported to the Nintendo Switch in 2019. It is a sequel to Into the Dead and part of the Into the Dead franchise.

== Gameplay ==
Players control a character seeking to return to his family during a zombie apocalypse. Similar to endless runner games, the character automatically runs throughout most of the game and must dodge zombies. If players are captured by a zombie on a level, they can escape by either using a knife, companions freeing you, an ally freeing you or using a weapon with a bayonet. After that, they are freed but cannot be saved again, unless they have a knife. Players can unlock and upgrade a variety of weapons, including pistols, rifles, shotguns, crossbows, and grenades. Indestructible animal companions and power-ups are also available.

== Development ==
Prior to Into the Dead 2's worldwide launch, PikPok soft launched it in Australia for iOS on August 9, 2017, and for Android on August 29, 2017. It was launched worldwide for both platforms on October 13, 2017. Versus Evil released it for the Switch on October 25, 2019. The original iOS and Android versions are free-to-play and have microtransactions; these were removed from the Switch version. Netflix released Into the Dead 2: Unleashed in March 2022 for their subscribers; this version also removes the microtransactions.

== Reception ==
Pocket Gamer said the mobile version "offers pretty much everything you could want in a zombie shooter". Although 148 Apps said it had "a smooth framerate" and "nicely polished visuals", they called it an unambitious and unoriginal game designed to draw players into spending money on microtransactions to upgrade their weapons. While recognizing the mobile game's popularity, TouchArcade criticized what they felt were limited and repetitive gameplay and a high price on the Switch. Pocket Gamer named Into the Dead 2: Unleashed the best Netflix game at the 2022 Pocket Gamer Awards. The Switch version received negative reviews on Metacritic. Reviewing the Switch version, Nintendo Life called the gameplay "pretty simple and repetitive" and said it "becomes a pretty mindless grind very, very quickly".

== Sequel and spin-off ==
A third instalment called Into the Dead 3 was announced as being in development with a teaser trailer during the 10-year anniversary of the release of Into the Dead, on 13 December 2022. It is set ten years after the events of the second game and will feature both new and returning characters.

A spin-off title Into the Dead: Our Darkest Days was also announced on 15 December 2022. It breaks with the endless runner, mobile game format of the franchise, instead focusing on base-building, scavenging, and character-driven choices. It was released for PC on Steam on 9 April 2025 in Early Access.

== Notes ==
1.Allies are only available on several Side Stories.
