= NRL Mascot Mania =

2009 video game

- Developer: Wicked Witch Software
- Publisher: Tru Blu Entertainment
- Series: Rugby League
- Platform: Nintendo DS
- Release: AU: 2 July 2009
- Genres: Adventure; Platform
- Modes: Single-player; Multiplayer

NRL Mascot Mania is a National Rugby League video game, developed by Wicked Witch Software for Nintendo DS. It was released in July 2009.

== Production ==
A Screenshot of a Mascot fighting through his own themed world.

The games focus more on the mythology of the League's Mascots than on the sport itself. The central component of the game is the adventure the players Mascot will experience in the themed worlds. As such, it is aimed at the younger fans of Rugby League.

Managing Director of Wicked Witch Software, Daniel Visser, says that, while the games share style and genre, they both have several unique worlds, trading card sets, and mini games and, of course, each leagues sports game to unlock.

A screenshot of the Rugby League game included.

== Gameplay ==
The game will bring NRL teams mascots to life in an action adventure. There are 48+ levels, 16 playable characters and numerous mini-games including an unlockable mini-game of Rugby League. Each team has its own themed world, with 3 levels, including 1 boss arena. All the team mascots come with their own powers which you use to defeat the enemies. Abilities include fiery fists and ground smash. Your character will face other teams mascots in 'boss battles'. Players can also collect and trade NRL playing cards wirelessly in the game. As well as collectable cards, gold can be found around the game world to purchase the cards from an ingame shop. The cards are used to unlock players for the minigame.

== Critical response ==
The first reviews for the game have been positive. Cyber Shack gave it a 4 to 4.5 out of 5 and Aussie Nintendo gave it a 7.5 out of 10. Mascot Mania's sister title for the AFL, a tie-in game for its Mascot Manor on the same platform, received an independent review from, Just Kidding, a gaming magazine targeted at school age children, saying the game hits the mark and giving it 4 out of 5.

== See also ==
- AFL Mascot Manor
- Rugby League Challenge
- Rugby League (video game series)
