= Into the Dead =

2012 mobile video game

- Developer: PikPok
- Publisher: PikPok
- Platforms: iOS; Android; Windows Mobile; Microsoft Windows
- Release: iOS; December 6, 2012; Android; April 5, 2013; Windows Mobile; January 4, 2014; Windows; March 28, 2016
- Genre: Survival horror

Into the Dead is a 2012 zombie-themed endless runner video game developed and published by PikPok for iOS, Android, Windows Mobile, and Microsoft Windows. A sequel titled Into the Dead 2 was released for iOS, Android, and the Nintendo Switch. It is the first instalment in the franchise of the same name.

== Gameplay ==
Players must run through a landscape teeming with zombies and move left or right to dodge them. The player has no choice but to move forward and get as far as possible before dying. Weapons can be picked up from supply crates as the player runs past.

== Reception ==
Reception

Aggregate score
Aggregator	Score
Metacritic	84/100

Review scores
Publication	Score
Gamezebo	90/100
IGN	7/10
MacLife	4/5
Pocket Gamer	4/5
TouchArcade	4.5/5
VideoGamer.com	6/10
Digital Spy	5/5

The iOS version received "favorable" reviews according to the review aggregation website Metacritic.

Digital Spy said, "Into the Dead is one of the best uses of the first-person perspective on iOS, and an absolutely fantastic infinite runner for mobile devices." Gamezebo said, "With Game Center online scoreboards and achievements that we will no doubt be struggling to top for weeks to come, and more modes promised in the near future, Into the Dead is a bit of a must-have for mobile - especially if zombies hit your spot." TouchArcade said, "When it works, it works unbelievably well - and with no asking price for those early, heart-pounding moments, there's absolutely no reason not to get this game." VideoGamer.com said, "Endless runners rarely offer up too much variety, but there is something oddly appealing about Into The Dead. Let's keep it simple: if you like zombies, buy it. Yeah."

== Sequels ==
A second instalment, Into the Dead 2 was released for Android and iOS on 13 October 2017 and the Nintendo Switch on 25 October 2019.

Into the Dead 2 was followed by Into the Dead: Our Darkest Days, a spin-off title, released in early access on 9 April 2025.

Into the Dead 3 was announced as being in development on 13 December 2022.
