= Mascot Manor =

Fictional home of Australian football mascots

Mascot Manor is the fictional house in which the Australian Football League (AFL) club mascots live. Prior to 2003, each AFL club had mascots; however, in order to appeal to Auskick players, a common theme was decided upon for club mascots. Most clubs have an historical link with their mascots. The story begins with Toby "Torpedo" Coleman, a young, Northern Territory boy who dreams of playing AFL, stumbling across "Mascot Manor" where the 18 mascots live. Some clubs have since moved away from the Mascot Manor character to a mascot of their own choosing.

In 2009, Tru Blu Entertainment published a Nintendo DS game adaptation, developed by Wicked Witch Software based on Mascot Manor.

== List of mascots ==
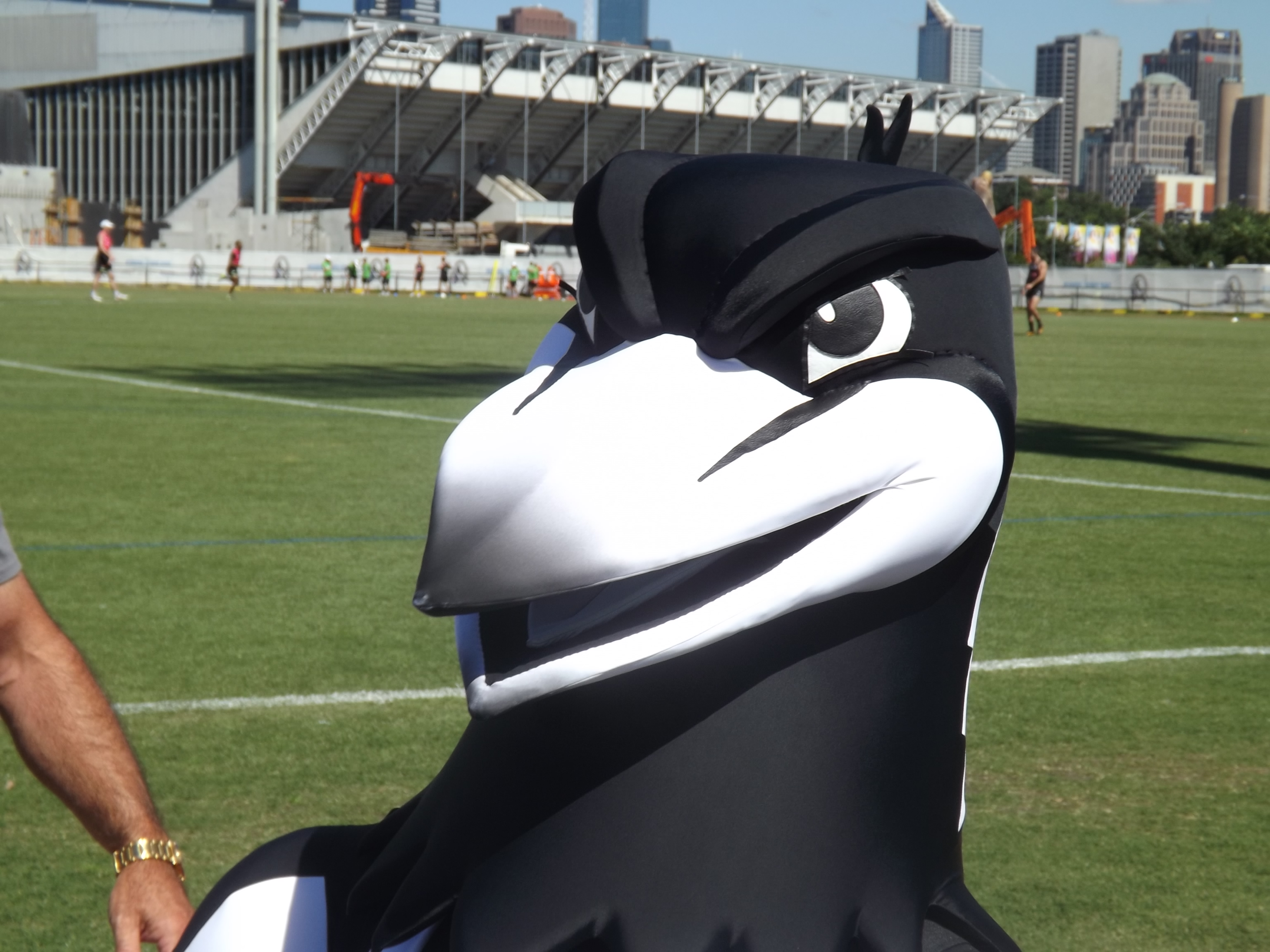
Jock "One Eye" McPie is Collingwood's mascot.

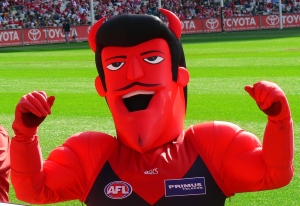
Ronald "Dee" Man is Melbourne's mascot.

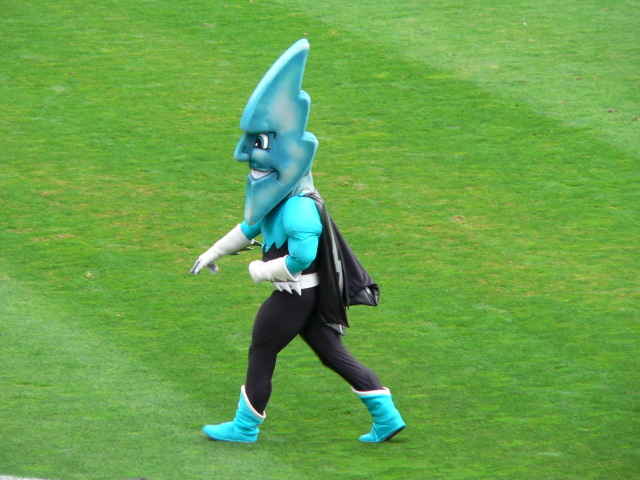
Tommy "Thunda" Power is Port Adelaide's mascot.

Club	Mascot name	Named after
Adelaide Crows	Claude "Curls" Crow	Neil Kerley
Brisbane Lions	Bernie "Gabba" Vegas	Bernie Quinlan
Carlton Blues	Captain Carlton	
Collingwood Magpies	Jock "One Eye" McPie	Jock McHale
Essendon Bombers	Moz "Skeeta" Reynolds	Dick Reynolds
Fremantle Dockers	Johnny "The Doc" Docker	The Fremantle Doctor
Geelong Cats	"Slammin" Sam Tomcat	John "Sammy" Newman
Gold Coast Suns	Sunny Ray & Skye	The Sun
Greater Western Sydney Giants	G-Man	
Hawthorn Hawks	Hudson "Hawka" Knights	Peter Hudson & Peter Knights
Melbourne Demons	Ronald "Dee" Man	Ron Barassi
North Melbourne Kangaroos	Barry "Bruiser" Cracker	Peter "Crackers" Keenan & Barry Cable
Port Adelaide Power	Tommy "Thunda" Power	
Richmond Tigers	Tiger "Stripes" Dyer	Jack Dyer
St Kilda Saints	Trevor "Saint" Kilda	Trevor Barker
Sydney Swans	Syd "Cyggy" Skilton	Bob Skilton
West Coast Eagles	Rick "The Rock" Eagle	"Eagle Rock" by Daddy Cool
Western Bulldogs	Woofer "Dogg" Whitten	Ted Whitten
Tasmania Devils	Rum'un the Tasmanian Devil	

== AFL Mascot Manor game ==
In 2009, Tru Blu Entertainment published a Nintendo DS game adaptation, AFL Mascot Manor, based on Mascot Manor. It was developed by Wicked Witch Software, the same developers who made AFL Live 2 in 2013.

=== Gameplay ===
The game is a platformer like Mario or Rayman, with levels based on the mascots. There are collectible footy cards hidden in the levels.
