= Rugby League Live 2 =

2012 sports video game

- Developer: Big Ant Studios Wicked Witch Software(iOS)
- Publisher: Tru Blu Entertainment
- Series: Rugby League
- Platforms: PlayStation 3, Xbox 360, iOS
- Release: AU: 9 October 2012
- Genre: Sports
- Modes: Single-player, Multiplayer

Rugby League Live 2 is a sports video game in the Rugby League series of Rugby league video games. It was developed by Big Ant Studios for PlayStation 3 and Xbox 360. It was released on 9 October 2012. Commentary was provided by Andrew Voss and Phil Gould. The cover features Wests Tigers player Benji Marshall.

== Gameplay ==
A 10-year career mode will include the ability to hire a coaching staff, negotiate player contracts and set player training programs, and sign sponsors. You can create custom teams in Footy Factory and share them online.

== Features ==
Grass wears away in areas of play. Players will accumulate mud on their bodies specifically where they the field. Players will also sweat based on their exertion level. It will include 34 stadiums from Australia, New Zealand, France and the United Kingdom.

=== Online ===
Competitive or co-operative multiplayer matches with up to eight players (four a side) online, an experience system to earn badges and also a leaderboard.

== Version history ==
=== Version 1.0 (2012 Release) ===
This was the release of the game for the upcoming 2013 seasons of rugby league, released on 9 October 2012.

=== Version 1.1 (2012 Update) ===
Tru Blu Entertainment first release a free patch for Rugby League Live 2 on 20 December 2012 which included a number of in-game fixes which saw some gameplay improved.

=== Versions 1.2 (2013 Update) ===
On 18 June 2013 Tru Blu Entertainment released the game's second patch update via the Xbox Live and PSN Networks. This patch gave users access to the Downloadable Content which could be purchased from the main menu.

== Downloadable Content ==
On 31 May, Tru Blu Entertainment announced Rugby League Live 2 would receive an update to the game. The 2013 Season Pack developed by Melbourne's, Big Ant Studios will feature 2013 Team Kits, complete player roster updates, addition of new 2013 competitions, 2013 stadia, sponsors and a number of other features and improvements.

The update is to be released on 19 June 2013 as a DLC which can be purchased via the PlayStation Network for PlayStation 3 and Xbox Live Marketplace for Xbox 360 for around $12.

=== DLC Features ===
- 2013 Team Kits: Telstra Premiership jerseys; Holden State of Origin jerseys; AAMI City vs Country Origin jerseys, Holden Cup jerseys, NRL All Stars and Indigenous All Stars jerseys, Holden Kangaroos jerseys and Super League jerseys. Total of 104 new team kits.
- 2013 Roster Updates: Telstra Premiership, Holden State of Origin, AAMI City vs Country Origin, Holden Cup, NRL All Stars and Indigenous All Stars, Holden Kangaroos and Super League.
- Career Mode: 2013 Telstra Premiership and 2013 Super League added.
- New 2013 competitions added: Telstra Premiership, Holden State of Origin, AAMI City vs Country Origin, Holden Cup, NRL All Stars and Indigenous All Stars, VB Test Match, Super League and World Club Challenge.
- Stadia: New 2013 field markings, updated stadium sponsor hoardings and updated stadium naming rights.
- Footy Factory: All new 2013 content is available for use in team creator.
- Plus other features and improvements. This was also included in the Rugby League Live 2 World Cup Edition

== See also ==
- Rugby League (video game series)
