= GripShift =

2005 video game

- Developer: Sidhe
- Publishers: NA: Platform Publishing; PAL: Ubisoft; Sidhe (Xbox 360)
- Designer: Andy Satterthwaite
- Engine: PhyreEngine
- Platforms: PlayStation Portable, PlayStation 3, Xbox 360
- Release: PlayStation Portable: NA: September 13, 2005; EU: November 18, 2005; PlayStation Network: NA: January 4, 2007; EU: March 23, 2007; AU: March 23, 2007; Xbox Live Arcade: NA: December 12, 2007; EU: December 12, 2007
- Genres: Puzzle-platform, driving
- Modes: Single-player, multiplayer

GripShift is a racing video game developed by Sidhe for the PlayStation Portable. It was released in 2005 by Platform Publishing in North America and Ubisoft in PAL territories. The game was later released to download on PlayStation 3 in 2007 via the PlayStation Store (and is no longer available to purchase since 2014), and for the Xbox 360 via Xbox Live Arcade. GripShift is a cross between a puzzle-platform game like Super Monkey Ball and a driving game like Stunt Car Racer.

== Gameplay ==
GripShift is a racing video game. The PSP version features official downloadable tracks at the official website. The "Turbo Expansion Pack" downloadable content was released on February 13, 2008, exclusively for the Xbox 360 version. The content adds new single-player and multiplayer modes, eight Race Tracks, eight Deathmatch Arenas, and eighteen new music tracks.

== Reception ==
Reception

Aggregate score
Aggregator	Score		
Aggregator	PS3	PSP	Xbox 360
Metacritic	67/100	70/100	72/100

Review scores
Publication	Score		
Publication	PS3	PSP	Xbox 360
Edge	N/A	7/10	N/A
Electronic Gaming Monthly	N/A	5.5/10	N/A
Eurogamer	N/A	7/10	8/10
Famitsu	N/A	27/40	N/A
Game Informer	N/A	8.25/10	N/A
GameSpot	6.5/10	6.5/10	N/A
GameSpy	N/A	3/5	N/A
GameZone	N/A	7.8/10	8/10
IGN	7/10	7.5/10	7/10
Official U.S. PlayStation Magazine	N/A	3.5/5	N/A
Official Xbox Magazine (US)	N/A	N/A	5.5/10
The Sydney Morning Herald	N/A	4/5	N/A

The game received "average" reviews on all platforms according to the review aggregation website Metacritic. In Japan, Famitsu gave the PSP version a score of three sevens and one six for a total of 27 out of 40.

At the 2005 Australian Game Developers Conference GripShift won "Best Handheld Game", "Best Level Design" and "Best Game Design". In late 2005 IGN awarded GripShift runner-up to Lumines for the most innovative design for a handheld game in their annual Game of the Year Awards. GripShift also won "Best Handheld Game" in the 2005 Sumea awards.

== See also ==
- Racing Destruction Set
- Stunts, a similar game
- Trackmania, a similar game
