= Rugby League 3 =

2010 sports video game

- Australian cover art
- Developer: Sidhe Interactive
- Publisher: Tru Blu Entertainment
- Series: Rugby League
- Platform: Wii
- Release: AU: 18 March 2010; FRA: 18 March 2010; UK: 16 April 2010
- Genre: Sports
- Modes: Single-player, Multiplayer

Rugby League 3 is a sports game for the Wii, which was released on 18 March 2010 in Australia, France and New Zealand. It was released in United Kingdom on 16 April 2010. Commentary is provided by Andrew Voss.

== Features ==
- 38 stadiums from Australia, France, New Zealand and the United Kingdom.
- Team level gameplay features including defensive line controls, attacking strategy selection, team confidence, and AI support play.
- Build a champion team in the Multi-year Franchise Mode including advanced player management, Dally M Player of the Year and Man of Steel, club records and optional manual rep selection.
- Create and customise players, teams, and competitions
- Three control schemes: the Wii Remote, the Wii Remote and Nunchuk, or the GameCube controller

== Leagues ==
There are 8 confirmed domestic leagues to date and over 80 teams in the game, as well as an unconfirmed amount of national teams. New to Rugby League 3 are the Toyota Cup, Co-operative Championship and Championship One; none of which are featured in prior versions.

== Reception ==
Rugby League 3 received mixed to poor reviews, with a GameRankings average of 57%.

The Australian video game talk show Good Game's two reviewers gave the game a 6/10 and 8/10.

IT Reviews commented that the "full-on management mode... is a boon, given that rugby management games are an even rarer breed. In fact, there's an argument that it's in the franchise segment that the game is at its strongest." However, the site also noted that "on the field of play, though, problems do start to kick in, primarily with the control system. It's a fiddly beast to learn, and we came nowhere near to mastering how best to work the Wiimote and Nunchuk in sufficient uniformity to guarantee that our intentions were reflected on the screen."

GameSpot gave it 6.5/10, and concluded that: "Rugby League 3's expanded team roster and fast-paced multiplayer may breathe new life into the series, but its lousy motion controls and outdated player stats leave it sitting on the bench."

== See also ==
- Rugby League (video game series)
