= Shatter (video game) =

2009 video game

- PlayStation Store icon
- Developer: Sidhe (Note: Remaster developed by PikPok.)
- Publisher: Sidhe (Note: Remastered version published by Netflix. Remastered Deluxe version published by PikPok.)
- Designers: Alan Bell, Antony Blackett, James Everett, Jonathan Brown
- Composer: Module
- Engine: PhyreEngine; Unity (Remastered and Remastered Deluxe)
- Platforms: PlayStation 3, Windows, OS X, Linux, iOS, Android, Switch, PlayStation 4, PlayStation 5, Xbox One, Xbox Series X/S
- Release: PlayStation Network; July 23, 2009; Windows; March 15, 2010; OS X September 18, 2012; Linux; March 14, 2013; Remastered iOS, Android; March 23, 2022; Remastered Deluxe; Windows, Switch, PS4, PS5, Xbox One / Series X/S; November 2, 2022
- Genre: Action
- Mode: Single-player

Shatter is an action video game developed and published by Sidhe. The game was released on July 23, 2009 for PlayStation 3 via PlayStation Network, on March 15, 2010 for Microsoft Windows, on September 18, 2012 for OS X, and on March 14, 2013 for Linux. A remastered version developed by Sidhe's successor PikPok and published by Netflix was released for iOS and Android via Netflix Games on March 23, 2022. A version of the mobile remaster published by PikPok, subtitled Remastered Deluxe, was released on November 2, 2022 for Windows, Nintendo Switch, PlayStation 4, PlayStation 5, Xbox One, and Xbox Series X/S.

Shatter uses the Arkanoid gameplay mechanic, with the addition of physics forces "suck" and "blow" to give the player control of the ball and other physics-enabled objects.

== Gameplay ==
The player can use the suck mechanic to pull shards, power-ups and other objects towards the paddle.

The game area consists of a paddle, a ball, and a field of blocks. To clear a level, the player must destroy all of the blocks. This is most commonly done by guiding the ball into them but blocks can also be destroyed using the Shard Storm power-up, by hitting the blocks with the paddle itself, or by sucking in fragments with the shield enabled to create "ricochet" bullets.

As well as using the paddle to strike the ball, the player can also suck objects toward it or blow objects away. When a block is broken, it releases a number of shards that the players should collect in order to charge their Shard Storm bar. This can be done more efficiently by using the suck function to pull shards toward the paddle. The player collects these shards using the paddle. The suck and blow functions also affect the ball's trajectory so can be used to more accurately guide the ball to specific targets. Some blocks also react to the in-game physics and will move towards or away from the paddle as the suck and blow actions are used. The player can activate a shield around the paddle which will destroy blocks on contact; however, this also drains power from the Shard Storm meter. If a block hits the paddle when the shield is not activated the player loses control of the paddle for a few moments.

Some blocks contain power-ups that have to be collected. All power-ups in the game are positive and trigger functions such as doubling the number of shards on the screen, making the ball more easily maneuverable, or giving the player an extra life. The player collects these power-ups by catching them with the paddle. Players can also release multiple balls into the arena at once. While this allows the player to collect points and clear the stage more quickly, it also makes the game more difficult.

== Development ==
On March 15, 2010, Shatter was released on for Windows through Steam. This updated release includes extra modes. Ports of this version for Mac OS X and Linux were released as part of the Humble Indie Bundle 6.

The soundtrack for Shatter was composed by the electronic musician Module, and has been featured in its own right by the Bandcamp independent music website.

== Reception ==
Reception

Aggregate score
Aggregator	Score
Metacritic	(PC) 84/100 (PS3) 86/100

Review scores
Publication	Score
1Up.com	B
Destructoid	8.5/10
Eurogamer	8/10
G4	4/5
GamePro	4.5/5
GameRevolution	B
GameSpot	8/10
GameZone	8.5/10
Giant Bomb	4/5
IGN	9/10
PlayStation Official Magazine – UK	8/10

Shatter received "favorable" reviews on both platforms according to the review aggregation website Metacritic.

The PS3 version was nominated by 1UP.com as one of the most innovative games at E3 2009. Later, 1UP.com in its review called it "a fine interpretation of the old brick-breaker style" and praised the introduction of new and interesting gameplay mechanics to classic brick-breaker game genre. However, reviewer Ray Barnholt did comment on the game's brevity, saying that it could be completed in a couple of days.

== See also ==
- Arkanoid
- Magic Orbz
- Ricochet Infinity
