= Tony Johnson (broadcaster) =

New Zealand rugby broadcaster

Tony Johnson (born 29 August 1959) is a New Zealand rugby commentator and presenter for SKY Television and sports radio host for Sport Nation.

Johnson hails from Havelock. His father worked in the local marine team driving mail boats and worked as a ranger and mother was a teacher. He played for the Queen Charlotte College 1st XV as a lock and loose forward before playing club senior reserves. He also played premier cricket, basketball, golf and participated in swimming.

He suffers from peripheral neuropathy after first noticing a sore hip when he was in his late teens. That developed to weakness in his left leg and arm in his early 20s and had to give up rugby, but still played cricket and golf until he couldn't anymore. He walks with a profound limp. He has since become an advocate for stadia around the country to increase their facilities for people with accessibility issues.

He was always captivated by radio and started his broadcasting career in Blenheim in 1978 before stints in Tokoroa, Wellington, Dunedin, where he started his sports commentary, and worked in a local radio station in the Bay of Islands. He hosted the TVNZ show a Question of Sport in the late 1980s. Johnston was a reporter for Radio New Zealand in Europe based in London from 1988 and moved back to New Zealand in 1992 to work for Newstalk ZB as the sports editor and sports reader for the Paul Holmes breakfast and the station's main radio rugby commentator.

He was a sports presenter for TV3 in 1995 for four years while continuing his radio and sports commentary work before making the switch to SKY Television in 1999 when SKY increased their rugby coverage and needed more commentators and presenters. In 2001, Johnston focused solely on television and relinquished his radio work.

Johnson has been a feature at Rugby World Cups as a fan, reporter or broadcaster (excluding the 2019 and 2023 tournaments) and has covered the Commonwealth and Olympic Games in his capacity as a radio and television reporter or commentator.

Johnson is a well-known and respected commentator during New Zealand's coverage of Super Rugby and the national provincial championship during the winter and regional, national and a handful of international sevens competitions throughout the summer. He has commentated several All Black test matches – as SKY's main commentator is Grant Nisbett. Johnson's first test as a play-by-play commentator was in 2006 between South Africa and the All Blacks. He would often host the pre and post-match shows and appeared as the sideline commentator. He was a commentator during the 2011 Rugby World Cup and 2015 Rugby World Cup for host broadcaster SKY and ITV respectively.

He covered equestrian for SKY during the 2012 Olympic Gamescoverage, sevens for the 2020 Tokyo Olympics for the world feed and pole vault for New Zealand viewers during the 2024 Paris Olympics.

He also hosted a popular weekly Tuesday evening rugby analytical show Re-Union for over a decade before that was replaced by the shortened Sunday highlights show Rugby Nation screened on Prime TV and SKY in 2014. Johnson often appears on the weekend sports radio shows, podcasts and television news programmes voicing his opinion on rugby and fills in on Sky Sport programmes. He features on other radio networks as a guest contributor and a well-thought after guest speaker at events.

During January 2026, he was hosting shows on Sport Nation, operated by TAB NZ, before taking over from Ian Smith in May 2026 from Monday to Wednesday between 9am-12noon.

Johnson was the co-author of the book Behind the Silver Fern - The Players Speak with Lynn McConnell.

He revealed in a YouTube video he suffered from prostate cancer in 2019, which he recovered from.

Johnson currently resides in the Auckland suburb of Northcote with his wife and daughter. He was married by former colleague and newsreader John Hawkesby.
