= Rugby League 2: World Cup Edition =

2008 video game

- Developer(s): Sidhe Interactive
- Publisher(s): Tru Blu Entertainment
- Series: Rugby League
- Platform(s): PlayStation 2
- Release: AU: 6 November 2008; NZ: 7 November 2008; UK: 14 November 2008
- Genre(s): Sports
- Mode(s): Single-player, Multiplayer

Rugby League 2: World Cup Edition, a content update, was released exclusively on PlayStation 2 on 6 November 2008. It is available primarily in Australia, New Zealand and the UK. Limited quantities of the game are also available in other PAL territories.

== New features ==
- All New World Cup Mode
- Squad and Jersey updates for the NRL, Super League and World Cup International Teams
- Addition on new NRL franchise Gold Coast Titans, including play likeness
- Stadiums up to date and five New stadiums:
  - Skilled Park, Gold Coast
  - Browne Park, Rockhampton
  - New Craven Park, Kingston upon Hull
  - Twickenham Stoop, Twickenham
  - Stade Gilbert Brutus, Perpignan
- New in-game cut scenes
- New Twilight NRL Grand Final stadiums
- Unlockable NRL team heritage jerseys
- Updated commentary by Andrew Voss

== See also ==
- Rugby League (video game series)
