= 2013 in rugby league =

Top-level rugby league in 2013 centred on Australasia's 2013 NRL season and Super League XVIII. High-profile representative competitions included the 2013 Rugby League World Cup (held in Wales and England) and the 2013 State of Origin series.

== January ==
18: Jon Mannah, former player for Parramatta and Cronulla dies of Hodgkin's lymphoma at the age of 23.
25: Rugby Football League announce rule changes to apply to 2013 seasons of Super League, Championship, Championship 1, Challenge Cup and Northern Rail Cup
31: Marwan Koukash completes takeover of Salford City Reds

== February ==
22: Melbourne Storm win the 2013 World Club Challenge after beating Leeds Rhinos 18-14 at Headingley Carnegie Stadium

== April ==
19: The 2013 ANZAC Test is played, with Australia defeating New Zealand 32-12 before 25,628 at Canberra Stadium.
20: The Inaugural Pacific Rugby League International is played, with Tonga defeating Samoa 36-4 before 10,143 at Sydney's Centrebet Stadium.
29: A rising North Queensland Cowboys star, Alex Elisala dies after turning off his life support at Mackay Base Hospital.

== May ==
14: Salford City Reds announce they will change their name to the Salford Red Devils for the 2014 season.

== June ==
14: England beat The Exiles 30-10 in the International Origin match at Halliwell Jones Stadium in Warrington

== July ==
13: Australia beat New Zealand 32-22 in Armed Forces Rugby League World Cup final in Colchester.
13: France beat England 42-40 in Wheelchair Rugby League World Cup final in Gillingham.
14: Australia beat New Zealand 22-12 in the Women's World Cup final at Headingley Carnegie Stadium in Leeds
14: Australia beat Fiji 18-16 in Police Rugby League World Cup final at Headingley.
14: Australia beat England 26-16 in Tertiary Student Rugby League World Cup final at Headingley.
20: Leigh Centurions beat Sheffield Eagles 43-28 in Northern Rail Cup Final at The Shay in Halifax, West Yorkshire, winning the trophy for the fourth time in 10 years.
20: North Wales Crusaders beat London Skolars 42-24 in inaugural Northern Rail Bowl final at The Shay.
28: Graham Murray, former player and coach dies of a heart attack at the age of 58.

== August ==
24: Wigan Warriors win the 2013 Challenge Cup Final at Wembley Stadium, winning the competition for a record 19th time
28: Brothers Sam, Luke, Thomas and George Burgess become the first set of four brothers since 1911 to play together in the same rugby league team when they take the field for the South Sydney Rabbitohs.
28: York City Knights are relegated from Championship

== September ==
1: Featherstone Rovers beat Hunslet Hawks to win 2013 RFL Championship League Leaders' Shield, and relegate Hunslet to Championship 1.
1: North Wales Crusaders beat South Wales Scorpions to be crowned champions of 2013 Championship 1
1: Huddersfield Giants win first ever Super League League Leaders' Shield and finish top of the table in the top division for the first time in 81 years.
22: Warrington Wolves choose Huddersfield Giants in the Club Call for the 2013 Super League playoffs.
23: Wigan Warriors's fullback Sam Tomkins signs for New Zealand Warriors for 2014 season for a world-record fee, reportedly a fee of £700,000.
24: Hull FC's head coach Peter Gentle leaves the club after two years in charge, following 76-18 playoff defeat to Huddersfield
25: Hull F.C. appoint former player Lee Radford as new head coach replacing Peter Gentle. Radford becomes youngest current manager in the Super League
26: England's Gareth Ellis retires from international rugby league a month before the 2013 Rugby League World Cup
29: Rochdale Hornets beat local rivals Oldham 32-18 in 2013 Championship 1 playoff final at Leigh Sports Village

== October ==
6: The Sydney Roosters beat the Manly-Warringah Sea Eagles 26-18 in the 2013 NRL Grand Final.

26: The 2013 Rugby League World Cup opening ceremony and two games are held.

== November ==
- 1: Huddersfield, England - Four new members are formally inducted into the Rugby League Hall of Fame at a fundraising dinner at the John Smith's Stadium: Lewis Jones, Martin Offiah, Garry Schofield and Mick Sullivan.
- 28: Salford, England - The Rugby League International Federation awards are held with Sonny Bill Williams being named the 2013 international player of the year.
- 30: Stretford, England - The 2013 Rugby League World Cup final is won by Australia who defeated New Zealand 34-2 before a record international rugby league crowd of 74,468 at Old Trafford.
