= Rugby League Live 3 =

2015 video game

- Developer(s): Big Ant Studios
- Publisher(s): Tru Blu Entertainment
- Series: Rugby League
- Platform(s): Microsoft Windows; PlayStation 3 PlayStation 4 Xbox 360; Xbox One
- Release: PlayStation 4, Xbox One: AU: 10 September 2015; EU: 17 September 2015; PlayStation 3, Xbox 360: WW: 24 September 2015; Steam: WW: 30 September 2015
- Genre(s): Sports
- Mode(s): Single-player; Multiplayer

Rugby League Live 3 is a sports game in the Rugby League series of Rugby League video games. Rugby League Live 3 was released on PlayStation 3, PlayStation 4, Xbox 360 and Xbox One.

Although originally announced for a Q2 2015 release, publisher, Tru Blu Entertainment has since announced that the initial release would not be met. Big Ant Studios said that when the game releases, it would be available globally. The official trailer was released on 14 August along with a launch date of 10 September 2015, confirmed by Big Ant Studios and Sony Australia. This was later confirmed by Tru Blu Entertainment on 17 August. Tru Blu Entertainment announced that old generation platforms (PS3 and Xbox 360) would not be released until 24 September 2015. The Steam (PC) version was released on 30 September 2015.

On July 1, 2024, Tru Blu Games announced that Rugby League Live 3, along with Rugby League Live 4 would be removed from sale on all platforms due to their NRL license expiry. The Publisher stated that the servers would be kept back up.

== Features ==
Be A Pro has been newly added with the ability to take a forward or a back through the ranks of a U20 team into a full professional squad. An improved instant replay system including super slow-mo and user defined camera placement has been included. Dynamic time of day lighting with full sun movement and weather system giving dusk to night progress and mid game rain.

Career Mode has been enhanced with the ability to control a new star, rookie or create your player.

=== The FanHub ===
Available via Steam, the beta version of the FanHub allows user to customise the in game teams, players, referees as well as leagues. At the moment, users are able to customise and create players and clubs - with other features expected to be released in the future.

An update to the FanHub was released on 22 July 2015, which included a Goal Kicking Training Drill with a global leaderboard. Other features releases included additional licensed teams, tattoo and sponsor customisation

=== Licensed tournaments ===
- (Australia) (New Zealand) NRL
- (England) (France) Super League
- (England) (France) Kingstone Press Championship
- (England) (Wales) Kingstone Press League 1
- (Australia) (Papua New Guinea) Intrust Super Cup
- (Australia) (New Zealand) NSW Cup
- (Australia) (New Zealand) Holden Cup
- (Australia) (New Zealand) NRL Auckland Nines

=== Other teams ===
Representative:

- City
- Country
- Indigenous All Stars
- NSW Blues
- NRL All Stars
- Queensland Maroons

International:

- Australia
- Belgium
- Canada
- Cook Islands
- Czech republic
- Denmark
- England
- Fiji
- France
- Germany
- Greece
- Hungary
- Ireland
- Italy
- Jamaica
- Latvia
- Lebanon
- Malta
- Morocco
- Netherlands
- New Zealand
- Norway
- Papua New Guinea
- Russia
- Samoa
- Scotland
- Serbia
- South Africa
- Spain
- Sweden
- Tonga
- Ukraine
- United States
- Wales

Developer:

- Big Ant
- Fanhub Black
- Fanhub Red
- Tru Blu

== See also ==
- Rugby League (video game series)
