= Rugby League (video game) =

2003 video game

- Developer(s): Sidhe Interactive
- Publisher(s): Tru Blu Entertainment
- Series: Rugby League
- Engine: RenderWare
- Platform(s): Microsoft Windows, PlayStation 2, Xbox
- Release: AU: 12 December 2003; EU: 12 December 2003 (PC); EU: 19 December 2003 (PS2/Xbox)
- Genre(s): Sports
- Mode(s): Single player, multiplayer

Rugby League is a sports game video game developed by Sidhe Interactive and published by Tru Blu Entertainment. It was released in 2003 for Microsoft Windows, PlayStation 2, and Xbox. In Australia the game was released under the National Rugby League (NRL) license, but it was released under the title Stacey Jones Rugby League in New Zealand and Super League Rugby League in the UK. It is the first rugby league video game in the series. It was followed by Rugby League 2.

== See also ==
- Rugby League (video game series)
