= Into the Dead (franchise) =

Video game franchise

- Genres: Survival horror Action-adventure
- Developer: PikPok
- Publishers: PikPok; Versus Evil; Gearbox Publishing; Netflix; Boltray Games
- Platforms: iOS; Android; Windows Phone 8 Nintendo Switch; Windows macOS
- First release: Into the Dead; 6 December 2012
- Latest release: Into the Dead: Our Darkest Days; 9 April 2025 (early access)

Into the Dead is a video game franchise of zombie-themed survival horror and action-adventure games, developed and published by PikPok.

== Gameplay ==
The main instalments, Into the Dead (2013) and Into the Dead 2 (2017), are endless runner games. Players navigate through zombie-infested landscapes, moving left or right to dodge them and avoid obstacles while continuously advancing forward. The objective is to survive as long as possible or reach a destination point. Weapons can be picked up from supply crates along the way, and upgraded to deal with zombies more effectively.

Spin-off instalment Into the Dead: Our Darkest Days (2025) is set in Walton City, Texas in August 1980. The game adopts a 2.5D side-scrolling shelter survival format in which players manage a group of survivors during a zombie outbreak. Gameplay emphasises base-building, scavenging, permadeath, and character-driven choices.

== Games ==
Release timeline
2012	Into the Dead
2013
2014
2015
2016
2017	Into the Dead 2
2018
2019
2020
2021
2022	Into the Dead 2: Unleashed
2023
2024
2025	Into the Dead: Our Darkest Days
2026
2027	Into the Dead: Crimson Heights
TBA	Into the Dead 3

=== Into the Dead (2012) ===
The first main instalment of the series released for iOS on 6 December 2012, Android on 5 April 2013, Windows Mobile on 4 January 2014, and Windows on 28 March 2016. The game received "critical acclaim". It has a Metacritic rating of 84/100 based on 11 critic reviews.

=== Into the Dead 2 (2017) ===
The second main instalment was released for Android and iOS on 13 October 2017, and the Nintendo Switch on 25 October 2019. The game received "generally unfavorable reviews".

==== Into the Dead 2: Unleashed (2022) ====
A modified version of Into the Dead 2 was released exclusively for Netflix subscribers on 5 April 2022.

=== Into the Dead: Our Darkest Days (2025) ===
Into the Dead: Our Darkest Days is a spin-off title of the franchise which was announced on 15 December 2022. It is a side-scrolling survival horror game, released in early access for Windows and macOS via Steam on 9 April 2025. It has been described as a blend of This War of Mine and State of Decay.

=== Into the Dead: Crimson Heights (2027) ===
Into the Dead: Crimson Heights is an upcoming virtual reality survival horror game developed and published by PikPok for Meta Quest 3 and Meta Quest 3S. It is planned to release in 2027.

=== Into the Dead 3 (TBA) ===
A third main instalment was announced on 13 December 2022 on the 10th anniversary of the franchise. It is currently in development.
