= Rugby League Challenge =

2009 video game

- Developer: Wicked Witch Software
- Publisher: Tru Blu Entertainment
- Series: Rugby League
- Platform: PlayStation Portable
- Release: AU: 8 September 2009
- Genre: Sports
- Modes: Single-player, multiplayer

Rugby League Challenge is a sport simulation game for the PlayStation Portable based on the National Rugby League and the Super League. The game was developed by Australian game developer Wicked Witch Software and was published by Tru Blu Entertainment. The game is based on the 2009 NRL season and Super League XIV. It features all 16 NRL teams and 14 Super League teams.

== Gameplay ==
Rugby League Challenge gameplay

Rugby League Challenge allows players to play through the entire season, through to the Grand Final. It features a team management system where players can be trained up in skills such as kicking, tackling and running.

The game also features a quick match mode, as well as the season mode. Multiple camera angles are available to choose from both in the options menu and while playing the game. Camera angles range from close behind the player to wide zooms showing most of the stadium.

== Marketing ==
As part of the marketing campaign for Rugby Challenge, Network Ten's programme, Thursday Night Live, promoted the game claiming it was the inspiration for an inter-league kicking competition. Asides from television, Sony's Australian PSP site is featuring a front page advertisement for this title.

== See also ==
- AFL Challenge
- NRL Mascot Mania
- Rugby League (video game series)
