= Blood Drive (video game) =

2010 video game

- North American cover art
- Developer: Sidhe
- Publisher: Activision
- Platforms: PlayStation 3, Xbox 360
- Release: NA: 2 November 2010; EU: 19 November 2010
- Genre: Vehicular combat
- Modes: Single-player, multiplayer

Blood Drive is a 2010 vehicular combat video game developed by Sidhe and published by Activision for the PlayStation 3 and Xbox 360.

== Plot ==
Inspired by blood sport gameshow concepts like Death Race 2000, zombie fiction such as World War Z and the concept of humans and zombies learning to live together like in Fido, Blood Drive takes place in the aftermath decades of a zombie apocalypse.

Entertainers in the fictional desert city of Las Ruletas have stumbled upon a tourism goldmine with the advent of the titular death sport Blood Drive. The desert gambling resort sees champion Blood Drivers compete for glory using muscle cars, big rigs, and even a dune buggy and an ambulance fitted with spikes and guns. The aim is to stay alive inside a hostile zombie-infested environment while also attempting to destroy opponent vehicles.

Players are introduced during a growth period for the sport, enjoying enough success in the post-apocalypse to see its evolution into a televised game show, with larger than life celebrity contestants, vast derelict cities transformed into arenas and all the fortune and glory expected of such a gambling mecca.

== Gameplay ==
The player selects one of eight vehicles to drive and has to kill other players, while being attacked by zombies. The game features six expanded arenas in total. Multiplayer supports up to four players. The player will compete against other drivers in a tournament, and will complete different types of events. The players objectives will occasionally change. There are six main events, which feature different goals. The player will also be able to race, and will be able to kill other racers. The player has access to pick-ups including weaponry, health, and speed boosts. Killing a large number of zombies will activate the player's Rage Powers.

== Reception ==
Reception

Aggregate score
| Aggregator | Score | |
| Aggregator | PS3 | Xbox 360 |
|---|---|---|
| Metacritic | 47/100 | 40/100 |

Review scores
| Publication | Score | |
| Publication | PS3 | Xbox 360 |
|---|---|---|
| Destructoid | 4/10 | 4/10 |
| Game Informer | 4.5/10 | 4.5/10 |
| GamesRadar+ | 1.5/5 | 1.5/5 |
| GameZone | N/A | 3.5/10 |
| IGN | 5.5/10 | 5.5/10 |
| Joystiq | N/A | 1.5/5 |
| Official Xbox Magazine (UK) | N/A | 3/10 |
| Official Xbox Magazine (US) | N/A | 6/10 |
| PlayStation: The Official Magazine | 7/10 | N/A |
| The A.V. Club | N/A | F |

The game received negative reviews on both platforms according to the review aggregation website Metacritic.
