= Seti Kiole =

Tonga international rugby union player

- Born: 7 June 1980 (age 46) Holopeka, Ha'apai, Tonga
- Height: 1.98 m (6 ft 6 in)
- Weight: 112 kg (247 lb)
- Notable relative(s): Jonah Lomu (cousin); John Tamanika (cousin); Brad hunn (Step father); Bevan hunn (Stepbrother)

Rugby union career
- Position: Wing
Senior career
Years	Team	Apps	(Points)
2004-2005	Gloucester Rugby	12	(5)
–	Clermont Auvergne		
International career
Years	Team	Apps	(Points)
2005-08	Tonga	9	(10)

Seti Kiole (born 7 June 1980 in Holopeka, Tonga) is a Tongan rugby union footballer. His father, Peni Kiole, was a Tongan International. He is a cousin of Jonah Lomu. His position is winger. He is a cousin of NRL player John Tamanika.

Kiole plays for the ASM Clermont Auvergne in the French Top 14 league and previously played for Gloucester Rugby. He also plays for the Tonga national team. He represented his country in the 2007 Rugby World Cup. He weighs 112 kg (17.6 st).
