= Hot Wheels Battle Force 5 (video game) =

2009 vehicular combat video game

- North American Wii box art
- Developer: Sidhe
- Publisher: Activision
- Designers: Jonathan Brown; Andy Satterthwaite; Dan Smart; James Everett
- Series: Hot Wheels
- Platforms: Wii; Nintendo DS
- Release: NA: November 12, 2009; EU: November 20, 2009
- Genre: Vehicular combat
- Modes: Single-player, multiplayer

Hot Wheels Battle Force 5 is a 2009 video game developed by Sidhe and published by Activision for the Wii and Nintendo DS, and a children's vehicular combat game based on the 3D animated television series of the same name created by Mattel.

== Plot ==
During a mission, the Vandals get their hands on the Infinity Key, a device that opens all portals to Battle Zones. While Hatch tries to open it, the device malfunctions, separating the Battle Force 5, the Vandals, and the Sark. Vert, having been freed from capture early on, must find the rest of his team, reclaim the Infinity Key, and lock down the affected zones to stabilize them.

== Gameplay ==
The game features vehicular combat in numerous "Battle Zones" with the Sark and Vandals. The gameplay-loop consists of Vert driving along a linear-path to a designated point in the environment, engaging in vehicular combat with enemies, freeing one of his partners, and then using their vehicle in the following level. Each vehicle has a unique ability, such as grenades and four-bladed buzz saws.
