= John Tamanika =

NZ rugby league & union player

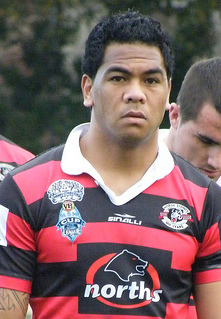
- Tamanika playing for the North Sydney Bears

Personal information
- Born: 15 November 1984 (age 42) Auckland, New Zealand
- Height: 183 cm (6 ft 0 in)
- Weight: 98 kg (15 st 6 lb)

Playing information

Rugby league
- Position: Wing, Centre
Club
Years	Team	Pld	T	G	FG	P
2008–09	South Sydney Rabbitohs	3	0	0	0	0

Rugby union
Club
Years	Team	Pld	T	G	FG	P
2009–10	Randwick DRUFC	15	7	0	0	0
- Source: As of 17 November 2023

John Tamanika (born 15 November 1984) is a former professional rugby football player who last played rugby union for Randwick in the Shute Shield. He played as a centre or on the wing. He formerly played rugby league professionally in the National Rugby League at the South Sydney Rabbitohs.

== Career ==
Tamanika played for the Otahuhu Leopards in the Auckland Rugby League between 1997 and 2002. He first played senior football for Victoria University of Wellington before playing in the Bartercard Cup for Wellington. Tamanika then moved to Central Queensland where he played for Central Queensland University and then the Central Queensland Comets at State Level. Tamanika played for Eastern Suburbs Tigers in the Queensland Cup in 2006 and 2007. In 2007 he was the Queensland Cup leading try scorer. In round 8 of the 2008 NRL season, Tamanika made his first grade debut for South Sydney against North Queensland at Stadium Australia. He would play a further two games for South Sydney that year. He would spend most of the campaign playing for the clubs feeder team North Sydney in the NSW Cup. He was chosen for the Tonga training squad for the 2008 World Cup but was not selected in the final squad.

== Personal life ==
Tamanika is the first cousin of former All Blacks Legend Jonah Tali Lomu and first cousin of Tongan rugby international Seti Kiole. Tamanika's mother (Mele Leamahi) Jonah Lomu's mother (Hepisipa) and Seti Kiole's father (Peni) are all siblings.
