= Melbourne Cup Challenge =

2006 horse-racing video game

- Australian cover art
- Developer: Sidhe Interactive
- Publishers: Australia: Tru Blu Entertainment; Europe: Home Entertainment Suppliers
- Producer: Andy Satterthwaite
- Designers: Andy Satterthwaite; Robert Curry; Daniel Mathers; E'van Johnston
- Platforms: Microsoft Windows, PlayStation 2, Xbox
- Release: EU: 8 December 2006
- Genres: Sports, racing simulation
- Modes: Single-player, multiplayer

Melbourne Cup Challenge, released in Europe as Frankie Dettori Racing, is a horse-racing video game developed by New Zealand studio Sidhe Interactive. It was released for Microsoft Windows, PlayStation 2 and Xbox. The European edition, titled Frankie Dettori Racing, was released on 8 December 2006 and was published by Home Entertainment Suppliers.

== Gameplay ==
Melbourne Cup Challenge is a horse-racing simulation containing playable race events and a stable-management component. Its game modes include Career Mode, Jockey Challenge and Betting Party. In Career Mode, the player can buy horses at auctions, breed and train them, and manage a racing stable.

The game includes twenty racecourses, including licensed representations of Flemington Racecourse, Caulfield Racecourse and Ascot Racecourse. The Australian edition includes the Melbourne Cup, while the European edition was licensed around jockey Frankie Dettori.

Single-player and multiplayer modes are included. The official website advertised online multiplayer through the Jockey Challenge and Betting Party modes.

Horse and jockey movements used motion-capture work performed with the involvement of Weta Digital's motion-capture team.

Home Entertainment Suppliers was identified on the game's official Australian website as its publisher and Australian distributor, with GameWizz Interactive handling distribution in New Zealand.

== Release ==
The European release was released on 8 December under the title Frankie Dettori Racing.
