= Rugby League 2 =

2005 video game

- Developer(s): Sidhe
- Publisher(s): Tru Blu Entertainment
- Series: Rugby League
- Platform(s): PlayStation 2, Xbox, Microsoft Windows
- Release: 8 December 2005
- Genre(s): Sports
- Mode(s): Single player, multiplayer

Rugby League 2 is a sports game of Rugby League. It is the sequel to the 2002 Rugby League, and was released on 8 December 2005 for PlayStation 2 and Microsoft Windows, and in July 2006 for Xbox.

The title was developed by New Zealand company Sidhe and published in Australasia by Tru Blu Entertainment and in Europe by Alternative Software. New Zealand Warriors captain Steve Price is featured on the cover. The United Kingdom release features former St. Helens captain Paul Sculthorpe on the cover.

== Features ==
=== Key improvements ===
PlayStation 2/Microsoft Windows

- Online multiplayer, allowing two players to play against each other in either a friendly match or a competitive "ranked" mode.
- More teams and players, with updated statistics and team strips.
- 40 Stadiums.
- Brand new gameplay features, including ball-stripping and pass-to-playmaker controls.
- Multi-year franchise mode, manage team finances.
- Massively upgraded graphics engine, allowing for more than 500 players.
- Motion-captured animation from Weta Digital.
- Highly customizable gameplay experience, with sliders and content editors that allow for considerable adjustment.

Xbox

- Online multiplayer, allowing two players to play against each other in either a friendly match or a competitive "ranked" mode. Also including scoreboards and voice chat support.
- Multiple save-slots available in Franchise and Competition modes.
- Shoulder-barge, fend and sidestep controls additionally on right thumbstick.
- Pause function disabled during ranked matches to prevent player exploiting this feature.
- Autosave available in Competition and Franchise modes.
- Graphical tweaks to improve the overall look and realism of the game.
- Improvements to management of custom and customized players and teams.
- New Zealand perform the Haka.

== Gameplay Modes ==
- Instant Action
  Jump straight into a game with random teams, pausing only to decide which team you want to play
- Single Game
  Set all the details (such as teams, weather, stadium - etc.) before jumping into a one-off friendly match
- Competition
  Take part in a full season of a popular competition or make up your own - includes multiplayer support, with the ability to play as 1 to all of the teams in the contest
- Franchise Mode
  Ten years back-to-back, with off-field management, player trading and representative competition spicing up the action
- Online
  Both friendly (no consequence) and ranked modes, allowing head-to-head multiplayer over the internet

== See also ==
- Rugby League (video game series)
