= AFL Challenge =

2009 video game

- Developer: Wicked Witch Software
- Publishers: Tru Blu Entertainment; Sony Computer Entertainment
- Series: AFL
- Platforms: PlayStation Portable, PlayStation Network
- Release: PlayStation Portable: AU: 10 September 2009; PlayStation Network: AU: 25 March 2010
- Genre: Sports
- Mode: Single-player

AFL Challenge is a sports game for the PlayStation Portable, based on the AFL. The game was developed by Australian games developer Wicked Witch Software, and was published by Tru Blu Entertainment and Sony Computer Entertainment. The games fixture is based on the 2009 AFL season and features all official AFL teams and a predetermined best 22 players for each team, whose positions cannot be changed.

== Gameplay ==
AFL Challenge allows players to play through the entire season, through to the Grand Final. It features a team management system where players can be trained up in skills such as kicking, tackling and running. Sony states that this will allow strategic choices to be made as the player goes through the season by training up key players.

The game also features a quick match mode, available from the main menu as well as the season mode. Multiple camera angles are available to choose from both in the options menu and while playing the game. Camera angles range from close behind the player to wide zooms showing most of the stadium. Each player is fully animated, demonstrating if they are successful or not, kicking, sprinting, tackling, hand balling or marking.

Fremantle vs. Sydney Swans screenshot

== Marketing ==
As part of the marketing campaign for AFL Challenge, Network Ten's program, Thursday Night Live, promoted the game and its sister title Rugby League Challenge, claiming it was the inspiration for an inter-league kicking competition. TV advertisements promoting both Sony's new PSP model and AFL Challenge were run on Channel 10 during the first week of the finals season. Asides from TV, AFL Challenge has also been advertised on the official AFL website, with a competition to win a PSP game pack including the game. Elsewhere online, Sony's Australian PSP site is featuring a front page advertisement for this title.

Western Bulldogs vs. St Kilda screenshot

== Reception ==
AFL Challenge was universally critically panned. GameSpot's Dan Chiappini called the game "an unrewarding bore", citing that "the experience is nothing more than shallow and unrewarding gameplay, technical issues, and horrible difficulty scaling." He also noted its lack of multiplayer, a season mode, commentary, player numbers, and its two grounds, one being a small suburban ground, unfit for AFL football, and the other appearing to be modeled on the MCG. He gave the game a "bad" rating and a 3 out of 10. PALGN said "AFL Challenge is a dud of the game that not even an AFL fan would enjoy" and gave it a 1 out of 10.

== See also ==
- Rugby League Challenge
- AFL Mascot Manor
- Wicked Witch Software
