= Tru Blu Entertainment =

Australian game publisher

Tru Blu Entertainment Pty. Ltd.
- Type: Privately held (Division of Home Entertainment Suppliers)
- Industry: Video games
- Founded: 1999; 27 years ago
- Headquarters: Sydney, New South Wales, Australia
- Website: www.trublu.com.au

Tru Blu Entertainment Pty. Ltd. is an Australian publisher that is a subsidiary of Home Entertainment Suppliers, who distribute their titles. It was founded in 1999. Their debut title was 2003's Sidhe Interactive-developed Rugby League which released for Microsoft Windows, PlayStation 2 and Xbox. Tru Blu Entertainment specialises in sports titles, having released a number of rugby league, Australian rules football, cricket and horse racing titles.

== Games published ==
| Year | Game | Developer | Platform(s) |
|---|---|---|---|
| 2003 | Rugby League: NRL Rugby League^{AU}; Stacey Jones Rugby League^{NZ}; Super League Rugby League^{UK} | Sidhe Interactive | Microsoft Windows, PlayStation 2, Xbox |
| 2005 | Rugby League 2 | Sidhe Interactive | Microsoft Windows, PlayStation 2, Xbox |
| 2006 | Melbourne Cup Challenge | Sidhe Interactive | Microsoft Windows, PlayStation 2, Xbox |
| 2008 | Rugby League 2: World Cup Edition | Sidhe Interactive | PlayStation 2 |
| 2009 | AFL Mascot Manor | Wicked Witch Software | Nintendo DS |
| 2009 | NRL Mascot Mania | Wicked Witch Software | Nintendo DS |
| 2009 | AFL Challenge | Wicked Witch Software | PlayStation Portable |
| 2009 | Rugby League Challenge | Wicked Witch Software | PlayStation Portable |
| 2010 | Rugby League 3 | Sidhe | Wii |
| 2010 | Rugby League Live | Big Ant Studios | Microsoft Windows, PlayStation 3, Xbox 360 |
| 2011 | AFL Live | Big Ant Studios | Microsoft Windows, PlayStation 3, Xbox 360 |
| 2011 | AFL | Wicked Witch Software | Wii |
| 2011 | Rugby Challenge: Jonah Lomu Rugby Challenge 2^{EUR}; All Blacks Rugby Challenge^{NZ}; Wallabies Rugby Challenge^{AU} | Sidhe | Microsoft Windows, PlayStation 3, Xbox 360, PlayStation Vita |
| 2011 | AFL: Gold Edition | Wicked Witch Software | iOS |
| 2012 | Rugby League Live 2 | Big Ant Studios | PlayStation 3, Xbox 360, iOS |
| 2013 | Rugby League Live 2: World Cup Edition | Big Ant Studios | PlayStation 3, Xbox 360, iOS |
| 2013 | Rugby Challenge 2: The Lions Tour Edition: All Blacks Rugby Challenge 2: The Lions Tour Edition^{NZ}; Wallabies Rugby Challenge 2: The Lions Tour Edition^{AU}; Jonah Lomu Rugby Challenge 2^{FR} | Sidhe | Microsoft Windows, PlayStation 3, Xbox 360 |
| 2013 | AFL Live 2 | Wicked Witch Software | PlayStation 3, Xbox 360 |
| 2014 | Don Bradman Cricket 14 | Big Ant Studios | Microsoft Windows, PlayStation 3, PlayStation 4, Xbox 360, Xbox One |
| 2015 | Rugby League Live 3 | Big Ant Studios | Microsoft Windows, PlayStation 3, PlayStation 4, Xbox 360, Xbox One |
| 2016 | Rugby Challenge 3 | Wicked Witch Software | Microsoft Windows, PlayStation 3, PlayStation 4, Xbox 360, Xbox One |
| 2016 | Don Bradman Cricket 17 | Big Ant Studios | Microsoft Windows, PlayStation 4, Xbox One |
| 2017 | AFL Evolution | Wicked Witch Software | Microsoft Windows, PlayStation 4, Xbox One |
| 2017 | Rugby League Live 4 | Big Ant Studios | Microsoft Windows, PlayStation 4, Xbox One |
| 2018 | AFL Evolution - 2018 Season Pack | Wicked Witch Software | Microsoft Windows, PlayStation 4, Xbox One |
| 2019 | Phar Lap: Horse Racing Challenge | PikPok | PlayStation 4, Xbox One |
| 2020 | AFL Evolution 2 | Wicked Witch Software | Microsoft Windows, Nintendo Switch, PlayStation 4, Xbox One |
| 2020 | Rugby Challenge 4 | Wicked Witch Software | Microsoft Windows, Nintendo Switch, PlayStation 4, Xbox One |
| 2026 | Rugby League Raw | PikPok | PlayStation 4, Xbox One |

== See also ==
- Rugby League (video game series)
