= Rugby Challenge (video game) =

2011 video game

- Developer(s): Sidhe
- Publisher(s): Tru Blu Entertainment
- Platform(s): PlayStation 3, Xbox 360, Microsoft Windows, PlayStation Vita
- Release: Xbox 360, PlayStation 3, Microsoft Windows: NZL: 26 August 2011; AU: 2 September 2011; EU: 14 October 2011; NA: 20 October 2011; PlayStation Vita; 27 June 2012
- Genre(s): Sports/Rugby Union
- Mode(s): Single-player, Multiplayer

Rugby Challenge is a Rugby video game, developed by Sidhe and published by Tru Blu Entertainment.

Rugby Challenge was released on 26 August 2011 in New Zealand for consoles and was released on 2 September for Australia and 8 September for South Africa. The release date for Jonah Lomu Rugby Challenge (rest of the world, excluding US/Canada) was 14 October. All NA versions except for PlayStation Vita were released 20 October, Tru Blu handled the PC and PS3 versions with Mad Catz handling the Xbox 360 version. The PlayStation Vita version was released on 27 June 2012. In game Commentary is provided by Grant Nisbett and Justin Marshall.

The game is titled All Blacks Rugby Challenge in New Zealand, Wallabies Rugby Challenge in Australia and Jonah Lomu Rugby Challenge in the rest of the world.

== Features ==
Rugby Challenge is based on Sidhe's previous Rugby League games. Features include:

=== Game modes ===
- Single Match Mode
- Competition Mode
- Multi-year Franchise Mode

Amongst other things, Rugby Challenge will feature 98 teams, 31 stadia, and 11 competitions as well as extensive Tutorial Mode options available for players new to the sport. The tutorial helps get you up to scratch and various skills, such as running between cones, practicing kicks, and many other drills can be completed. Apart from single and multi-player options, you'll also be able to play up to 13 seasons and attempt a legacy in Franchise Mode. Franchise mode will include both international and representative teams. You will be able to choose a club and an international side to play as during the years. There is a World Championship in Franchise Mode.

=== Extensive customisation ===
- Create and/or customise players, teams, and competitions, using the extensive customisation tools to shape the game to your own preferences.

=== In-Game Rugby Store ===
- Rugby Challenge also features Rugby Money, which players can use to obtain unlockables. These rewards come from completing various activities, whether running through the tutorials or playing online, and can be spent in the Rugby Store. This is not an online function, but rather an in-game unlockable system.

=== Licences ===
Rugby Challenge will feature 94 licensed/unlicensed teams, an additional 4 miscellaneous teams, and 31 stadiums from New Zealand, Australia, South Africa and Europe. Due to rival game, Rugby World Cup 2011, the official strip/emblem/stadium/player likenesses of England, South Africa and France, and the official strip/emblem/stadium of Wales, Scotland, Ireland and Italy will not be included within the game. However, due to Top 14, Aviva Premiership and RaboDirect Pro12 licenses the players of these countries will be included within the game (England, France, Ireland, Wales, Scotland and Italy). Rugby legend Jonah Lomu has also lent his likeness and expertise to the game, the European game will feature him on the cover, and the game will be called Jonah Lomu Rugby Challenge.

=== Stadiums ===
Rugby Challenge features 14 New Zealand stadiums, 6 Australian stadiums, 5 South African stadiums and 6 European stadiums.

== Reception ==
Reception

Aggregate score
Aggregator	Score
Metacritic	Xbox 360: 73/100; PS3: 64/100

Review scores
Publication	Score
GamesMaster	80/100
GameSpot	65/100
IGN	70/100
Official Xbox Magazine (US)	70/100
PSM3	58/100
Gaming Nexus	91/100

Rugby Challenge received mixed to positive reviews by critics. At Metacritic, which assigns a weighted average rating out of 100 to reviews from mainstream critics, the PS3 version of the game received a 64/100 rating, while the Xbox 360 was better reviewed, with a 73/100 rating. GameSpot commented that "inconsistent presentation and licensing issues trip up Rugby Challenge's run for the try line, but enjoyable gameplay and a wealth of modes give it a decent chance at life beyond the World Cup," giving the game a 65 over 100.

== Sequels ==
Rugby Challenge 2 was announced on 20 March 2013, the sequel is set for release midyear 2013 for the Xbox 360, PlayStation 3, and PC. It is going to be Rugby Challenge 2: The Lions Tour Edition in most regions, apart from France where it is known as Jonah Lomu Rugby Challenge 2, and New Zealand, where it is to be called All Blacks Rugby Challenge 2.

The third title in the series, Rugby Challenge 3, developed by Wicked Witch Software, was released on 14 April 2016 in New Zealand, and in Australia on 22 April 2016. It was released for Microsoft Windows on 24 June 2016.

A fourth title, Rugby Challenge 4, developed by Sidhe, was released 4 August 2020.
