= Jonah Lomu =

New Zealand rugby union player (1975–2015)

Jonah Lomu MNZM
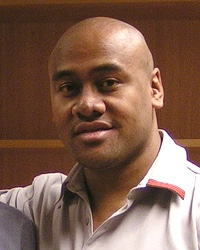
- Lomu in 2004
- Born: Jonah Tali Lomu; 12 May 1975 Pukekohe, Auckland, New Zealand
- Died: 18 November 2015 (aged 40) Auckland, New Zealand
- Height: 196 cm (6 ft 5 in)
- Weight: 125 kg (276 lb; 19 st 10 lb)
- School: Wesley College
- Notable relatives: John Tamanika (cousin); Seti Kiole (cousin)

Rugby union career
- Position(s): Wing, Number 8
Senior career
| Years | Team | Apps | (Points) |
| 1994–1999 | Counties Manukau | 28 | (95) |
| 1996–1998 | Blues | 22 | (65) |
| 1999 | Chiefs | 8 | (10) |
| 2000–2003 | Hurricanes | 29 | (55) |
| 2000–2003 | Wellington | 21 | (65) |
| 2005–2006 | Cardiff Blues | 10 | (5) |
| 2006 | North Harbour | 4 | (0) |
| 2009–2010 | Marseille Vitrolles | 7 | (0) |
International career
| Years | Team | Apps | (Points) |
| 1994 | New Zealand U21 | 3 | (25) |
| 1994–2002 | New Zealand | 63 | (185) |
| 1996 | New Zealand Barbarians | 2 | (0) |
| 1998–1999 | New Zealand A | 3 | (15) |
| 2000–2002 | Barbarian F.C. | 4 | (25) |
National sevens team
| Years | Team | | Comps |
| 1994–2001 | New Zealand | | |
Medal record
Representing New Zealand
Men's rugby sevens
Commonwealth Games
| Gold medal – first place | 1998 Kuala Lumpur | Team |
Rugby World Cup Sevens
| Gold medal – first place | 2001 Argentina | Team |
Men's rugby union
Rugby World Cup
| Silver medal – second place | 1995 South Africa | Squad |

Jonah Tali Lomu MNZM (12 May 1975 – 18 November 2015) was a New Zealand professional rugby union player. He is widely regarded as one of the greatest and most influential players in the history of the sport, and as one of the most talented sportsmen of all time. Lomu is widely considered to have been the first true global superstar of rugby, and consequently had a huge impact on the game. For his fast and effortless style of play, Lomu was nicknamed the "freight train in ballet shoes", and was celebrated for his ability to shrug off tackles from multiple opponents at once.

Born in Pukekohe to Tongan immigrants from Haʻapai, Lomu grew up between rural Tonga and South Auckland. Attending Wesley College, he excelled in athletics and both rugby codes before pursuing a professional career. He became the youngest ever All Black when he played his first international in 1994 at the age of 19 years and 45 days. He was acknowledged as the top player at the 1995 World Cup for his 4-try performance in the semi-final against England. He shares with South African Bryan Habana the Rugby World Cup all-time try scoring record of 15, which he accumulated in only two tournaments.

At the height of his fame in the mid-1990s, Lomu became a globally recognised cultural icon of South Auckland and its Pasifika community. His performance at that Rugby World Cup and others that followed established him as "rugby union's biggest drawcard", just as the game turned fully professional, being a major audience pull in any match in which he appeared. He used his celebrity to support Pasifika community efforts and charities such as UNICEF, and often paid bills for his childhood friends in Māngere. Playing on the wing, Lomu finished his international career with 63 caps and 37 tries. Lomu was inducted into the International Rugby Hall of Fame on 9 October 2007, and the IRB Hall of Fame on 24 October 2011.

In 1995 he was diagnosed with nephrotic syndrome, a genetic kidney disorder. After a period of hiatus, he returned to play domestically rather than internationally. Lomu played for several domestic New Zealand provincial or Super Rugby sides, and late in his career played club rugby in both Wales and France. These included the Auckland Blues, with whom he won the inaugural 1996 Super 12 Final with, Chiefs and Hurricanes, and Counties Manukau, Wellington, and later North Harbour and the Cardiff Blues. His illness forced his retirement from professional rugby in 2007 at the age of 32. After returning from abroad, Lomu died unexpectedly on 18 November 2015 at home in Auckland.

== Early life and youth career ==
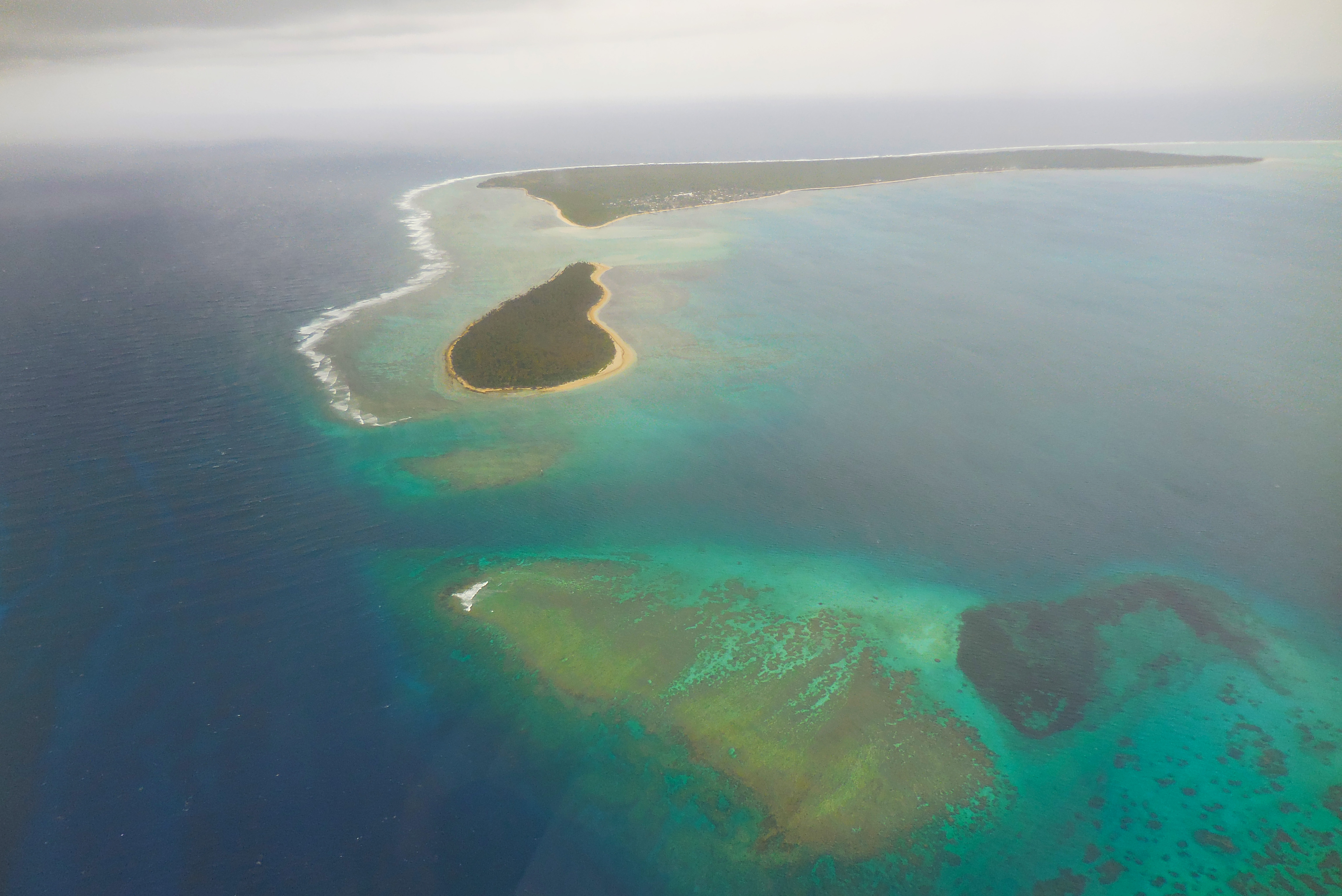
The Haʻapai Islands, Tonga, from which Lomu's parents emigrated, and where he spent parts of his childhood

Lomu was born in Pukekohe, Auckland, on 12 May 1975 to Tongan parents who had emigrated from Holopeka, a village on Lifuka in the Haʻapai islands. Lomu was a Tongan speaker; he spent some of his early childhood in Holopeka with his aunt Longo and uncle Mosese, where he spoke the language to fluency. He then moved back to Auckland suburb of Māngere to be educated, where he spent the rest of his childhood with his parents and siblings. There, he was exposed to nearby gang violence, and lost an uncle and a cousin to attacks. This led his mother to send him to Wesley College in Auckland. At high school, Lomu excelled in athletics, in particular, the 100 metres, shot put, javelin, high jump, hurdles and relay. In his final year, he ran the 100 mts in 11.2 seconds. By 1993, during his last year at Wesley, he started playing rugby more seriously, while still combining it with athletics.

He was first spotted playing for Wesley College by Counties Manukau senior coach Ross Cooper in 1991. Cooper gave Lomu his senior provincial debut for Counties against Horowhenua in May 1994, and later that year, as an All Blacks selector, was part of the panel that selected Lomu for his test debut.

New Zealand sevens star Eric Rush played a touch game with Lomu when he was 14 years old and was so impressed he invited him to a sevens tournament in Singapore the next day. As a youngster however, Lomu first played rugby league. His introduction to rugby union came through a tournament in Te Kuiti where he stayed with Glyn Meads, son of All Black Colin Meads.

Lomu started his rugby union career in the forwards, mostly as an openside flanker (no.7), sometimes to the blindside (no.6), before switching to the left wing in what he described as the "best move he could have made". He represented New Zealand in the national under-19 side in 1993, as well as the under-21 side the following year. He first came to international attention at the 1994 Hong Kong Sevens tournament as part of a team including Rush.

At the age of 19 years and 45 days, Lomu became the youngest All Black test player as he debuted on the wing against France in 1994, breaking a record that had been held by Edgar Wrigley since 1905. The match was played at Lancaster Park in Christchurch, and the All Blacks lost 22–8. The second match was played at Eden Park in Auckland with France winning again, 23–20. Lomu marked Emile N'tamack and later said that his inexperience led to him being exposed by the French team.

== 1995 World Cup ==
Despite having just two All Black caps, Lomu was included in the squad for the 1995 World Cup in South Africa. Lomu scored seven tries in five matches, two in the first match against Ireland in Johannesburg, a try in the quarter final against Scotland at Loftus Versfeld, and four tries in the semi-final against England at Newlands. The first try in the English match occurred after Lomu received a pass behind him, beat two defenders and then, after a stumble, ran straight over the top of Mike Catt. This caused one New Zealand commentator, Keith Quinn, to gasp.

After the game, England captain Will Carling said: "He is a freak and the sooner he goes away the better". His first score was voted the try of the tournament. In 2002 the UK public voted Lomu's performance no. 19 in the list of the 100 Greatest Sporting Moments. New Zealand played the World Cup final at Ellis Park against South Africa. Neither side scored a try, with South Africa coming out on top 15–12 after kicking a drop-goal in extra time.

== 1996–1998 ==
Following the World Cup New Zealand played Australia home and away for the Bledisloe Cup with Lomu scoring tries in both matches. He scored two tries in the All Blacks victory over Italy in Bologna. Lomu played against France in Toulouse, where New Zealand failed to score any tries. He scored a try in the second test in Paris, helping his team to victory. Lomu played for the All Blacks in matches against the touring Samoa and Scotland teams in June 1996, scoring in one of the Scottish matches.

Just before the World Cup final a deal was struck between South Africa, New Zealand and Australia (SANZAR) to create the Tri-Nations, an annual round robin competition between the three nations launched with the advent of professionalism in rugby. New Zealand won all their games to become the first Tri-Nations winners. Lomu scored a try in a 43–6 victory over Australia in the inaugural match, which has been described by New Zealand Herald journalist David Leggat as "the perfect wet-weather game".

At the end of 1996, Lomu was diagnosed with a rare and serious kidney disorder, which saw him take time off from the sport. As a result, he did not play in the 1997 Tri Nations Series, but he was included in the All Blacks tour of the northern hemisphere at the end of the year. Lomu played in the two warm up matches, scoring tries against Wales 'A' and Emerging England. He played the first test against England at Old Trafford, as well as the test against Wales at Wembley Stadium, and the second match against England—he did not score in any of the three games.

At the 1998 Commonwealth Games in Kuala Lumpur, he won a gold medal representing New Zealand in the Sevens Rugby event. The English rugby team came to New Zealand the following year for a two test series. Lomu played in both of the matches, scoring in the first, which was a 64–22 win in Dunedin, but not in the second test won 40–10 by the All Blacks.

== 1999 and the World Cup ==
Lomu's 1999 international season kicked off with a warm-up match against New Zealand A, which was followed by a game against Samoa in which Lomu scored one of the All Blacks' nine tries. He came on as a replacement in every game of the 1999 Tri Nations Series with Christian Cullen and Tana Umaga preferred as starters on the wings. New Zealand were crowned Tri Nations champions despite losing the last game against Australia.

Lomu scored eight tries at the 1999 World Cup. In pool matches he scored two tries against Tonga, one against England and two against Italy. The All Blacks finished top of their pool and proceeded to the quarter-finals. They defeated Scotland, with Lomu scoring one of New Zealand's four tries. Lomu scored twice in the semi-final match against France, though it was not enough to see them through to the final as France went on to win 43–31. Following the World Cup, despite speculation that he would be moving to play American football in the National Football League or stay to play rugby in the English Premiership, Lomu returned to New Zealand.

== End of international career ==
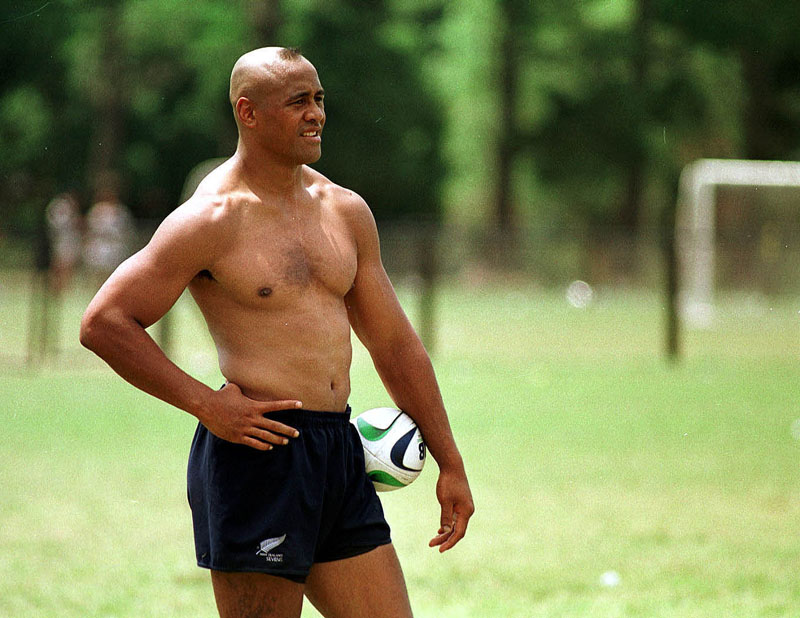
Jonah Lomu in training in 2001

Lomu started 2000 with big victories over Tonga and Scotland. The opening match of the 2000 Tri Nations Series was played in front of a record crowd of 109,874 and has been labelled the "match of the century'.' New Zealand scored three tries in the first five minutes to lead by 21 points, before Australia came back, leveling the scores before half time. With minutes remaining, the Wallabies led 35 to 34; until Lomu "brushed past a desperate Stephen Larkham to tip-toe down the line and score the winning try". The match was followed by a victory over South Africa, and then a re-match with Australia, which Australia won 24 to 23. New Zealand lost the final game to South Africa finishing second in the table, behind Australia. Lomu played in one other test that year; against France at Stade de France in November, which the All Blacks won 39 to 26.

Lomu was part of the New Zealand Sevens team that won the 2001 Sevens World Cup, filling in for Rush, who suffered a broken leg during the competition. In the lead up to the 2001 Tri Nations Series, the All Blacks played Argentina and France at home, Lomu scoring a try in the French match. After a try-less opening victory against South Africa Lomu played his 50th test for the All Blacks at the Carisbrook 'House of Pain', scoring a try in the second minute of play. The Wallabies spoiled the party however, winning 23 to 15. This was followed by a win over South Africa, and loss to the Wallabies at Stadium Australia.

During the 1999 off season, Lomu transferred to Wellington, signing up with second division club Wainuiomata RFC. Lomu played his debut match against Northern United scoring twice and attracting a bumper crowd and followed that up with a further appearance in 2001. Lomu wore the green and black club socks when he played for the Barbarian F.C. in 2000.

At the end of the year, the All Blacks played Ireland at Lansdowne Road in Dublin. Lomu was a central figure in the 40 to 29 win, setting up Aaron Mauger for his debut try, and taking an inside pass to blast through for one of his own. The All Blacks end of season tour continued at Murrayfield in Edinburgh, where they defeated Scotland 37 to six, with Lomu contributing one try. In the final match of the tour, the All Blacks played Argentina at the River Plate Stadium. Lomu put the All Blacks in front with a try after Argentina took an early lead. New Zealand won the match by a score of 24 to 20.

In his first test of 2002, he came off the bench in the second half to score a try in a match against Italy. He was again injected into play from the bench in the first of a two test series against Ireland in New Zealand; helping New Zealand to an uninspiring win. Lomu was back starting on the left wing for the second test against the Irish, which New Zealand won 40–8. Lomu did not score in the subsequent match against Fiji; in performance that was labelled "disappointing" by Matthew Cooper after he was beaten on the outside for Fiji's first try. Lomu came off the bench in the All Blacks first game of the 2002 Tri Nations Series against South Africa, though he did not play in the rest of the tournament.

He returned to the wing for a game against England in November 2002. Lomu ended up scoring two tries, though it was not enough to secure a New Zealand victory, with England winning 31–28. The subsequent match against France resulted in a draw, the first between the two nations in 96 years. The last match of the end of season tour was against Wales, which the All Blacks won 43–17. These were the last international matches that Lomu would play for New Zealand as his illness worsened and he needed a kidney transplant.

== Comeback ==
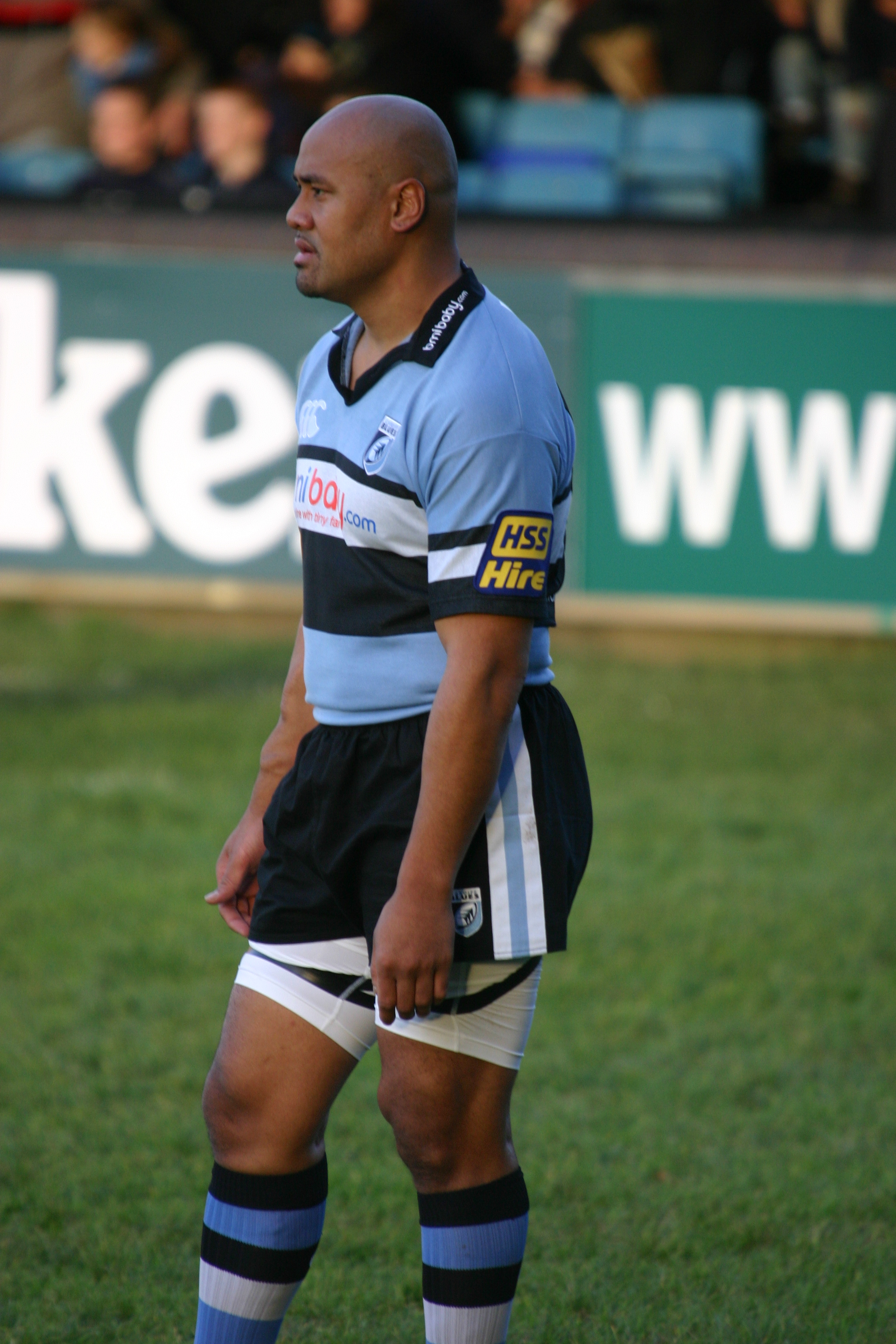
Jonah Lomu playing for Cardiff in 2006

Lomu returned to professional rugby in 2005. He first needed special clearance from the World Anti-Doping Agency, as one of the anti-rejection drugs he was required to take is on the WADA list of banned substances. On 8 April 2005, he signed a two-year contract to play for the New Zealand first division provincial team North Harbour in the NPC. He ended up missing the first season when he injured his shoulder scoring a try in a preseason testimonial match against Martin Johnson's invitational XV. Instead he worked in a coaching capacity. North Harbour gave him permission to play overseas at the Cardiff Blues over the off season.

Lomu made his first appearance in a competitive match since his transplant on 10 December 2005, with a 60-minute effort in Cardiff's away Heineken Cup fixture against Italian club Calvisano. Lomu scored his first try for Cardiff on 27 December, with a man-of-the-match performance during a 41–23 win against the Newport Gwent Dragons. He spent the early part of 2006 sidelined while he concentrated on gaining speed and strength not playing again until April. He broke his ankle near the end of his first game back, ending his season with Cardiff. During his time in Wales, he played 10 games and scored one try.

He returned to North Harbour for the 2006 NPC season, playing for Massey against Marist in the North Harbour club competition. For Lomu it was "a small step" towards his aim of reclaiming his All Blacks jersey for the 2007 World Cup. Lomu played for North Harbour in round four of the National Provincial Championship against Wellington winning 31–16. Lomu said after the match "For me it's a dream come true... I've always said this is my goal—to come back and play in New Zealand." Lomu failed to get a Super Rugby contract, effectively dashing any hopes of making the World Cup squad. Lomu stated that he was disappointed by his failure to gain a Super 14 contract, but that he had not failed himself.

Lomu was offered a contract with the Gold Coast Titans, a new Queensland franchise in the National Rugby League competition, but turned it down as it would have been difficult to reconcile his sponsorship contracts with companies associated with rugby union.

=== Retirement ===
Lomu retired from professional rugby in 2007, but still took part in some charity matches. He was going to play in the Help For Heroes charity match at Twickenham in 2008, but had to withdraw after injuring his ankle in training. Later that year Lomu played in a charity match at Aberavon RFC's Talbot Athletic grounds to raise money for a local children's charity. The match was covered by the BBC rugby show Scrum V.

In September 2009, Lomu took part in an amateur bodybuilding contest, finishing second in two categories, including the men's open over-90 kg, and the mixed pairs. He joined French Fédérale 1 team Marseille Vitrolles in November, making his debut in a 64–13 victory over against Montmelian. Lomu started the match at centre then moved to number 8, the position he played as a youngster in New Zealand.

Lomu also made an attempt to take part in a charity boxing event in New Zealand called "Fight for Life" 2011, for which he was the intended captain of the rugby union team. It was his intention to fight the main event against former league player Monty Betham. On 14 November Lomu pulled out of the competition as he had recently been hospitalised for over a week due to his failing kidney.

== Statistics ==
=== International tries ===
Lomu scored tries against every major test playing nation in World Rugby except South Africa (12 matches) and Wales (3 matches). In his career, Lomu scored eight tries against England—more than any other All Black. Lomu set a record of 15 tries in World Cup tournaments, which was equalled by South African Bryan Habana in 2015.

== Playing style ==
Lomu had a unique combination of power, size and speed that made him devastating with the ball in hand. He weighed 125 kg (276 lb) and was 1.96 metres (6 feet 5 inches) tall, but could run 100 metres (110 yards) in 11.2 seconds. He ran with a low centre of gravity and was the best exponent at bumping off attempted tackles in the game. He also had a powerful fend and subtle body swerve. He generally stayed out on his wing, but would occasionally replace Zinzan Brooke at the back of the scrum if the All Blacks wanted more power. Lomu was described as the "freight train in ballet shoes" by Australian rugby journalist Peter FitzSimons, who elaborated: "other players could go through players, other players could go around players... Lomu could do it all."

== Personal life ==
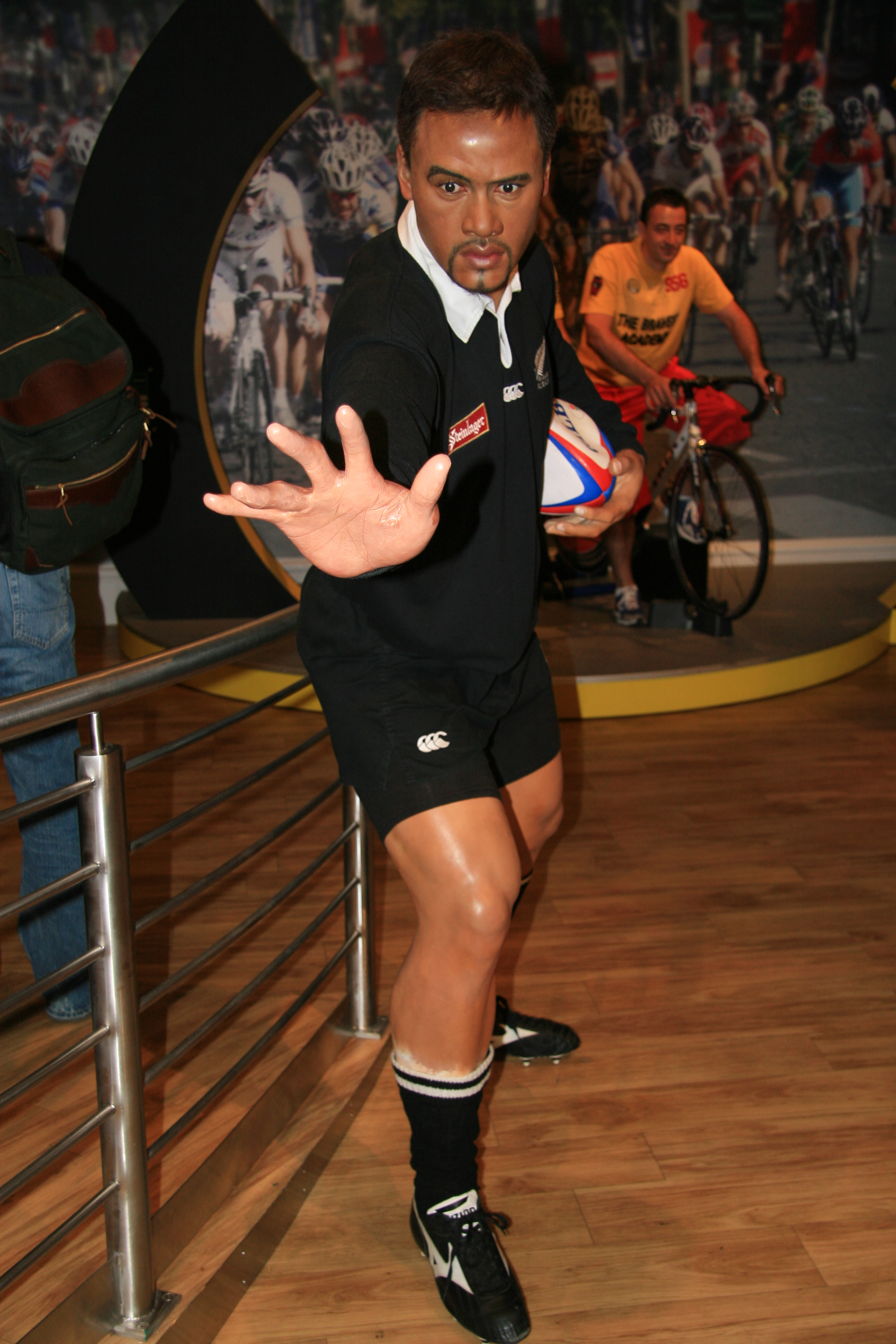
Waxwork of Lomu in Madame Tussauds London

In 1996, Lomu married South African Tanya Rutter, and they made their home in New Zealand. Lomu's family never approved of the relationship, and they divorced after four years of marriage.

Lomu married his second wife Fiona in a secret ceremony on Waiheke Island in August 2003, holding the wedding reception a week later on the same island. In 2008, Lomu and Fiona divorced after he had an affair with Nadene Quirk. Lomu and Nadene later married in 2011 and at the time of his death he was living with Nadene and their children, Brayley and Dhyreille. Lomu was a lover of languages. In addition to English and his parents' Tongan, he also learned to speak in French, Spanish, Mandarin, Cantonese and he had working proficiency in Russian.

Lomu was a member of the Champions for Peace club, a group of 54 elite athletes committed to serving peace in the world through sport, created by Peace and Sport, a Monaco-based international organisation. In 2012, Lomu and Nadene became members of the Church of Jesus Christ of Latter-day Saints.

In 1996, McDonald's New Zealand named a burger after Lomu, temporarily rebranding the McFeast burger line (called "Mega Feast" in New Zealand) as the "Jonah Burger".

On 9 April 2007, Lomu appeared on New Zealand's version of This Is Your Life, in which he was reunited with long time friend Grant Kereama, who had donated a kidney to Lomu when he underwent a kidney transplant in July 2004. He was a subject of the British version of This Is Your Life in 2002 when he was surprised by Michael Aspel while touring with the All Blacks in Edinburgh.

=== Financial troubles ===
Despite making millions of dollars during his rugby career, Lomu died with only a few assets to his name and very little savings. It is believed his earnings were absorbed by his divorces, medical bills related to his kidney disease, and failed business ventures.

Lomu was the director and a shareholder in Global 11 Travel, which was liquidated in 1999. At the time of his death, he owed money on property investments, as well as loans taken out to buy personal vehicles. His family were living in a rented $2.2 million (NZD) Auckland home. Lomu had sold some of his properties a decade prior, including his Maupuia mansion bought in 2000, which sold three years later for a reported $1.4 million (NZD).

== Health issues ==
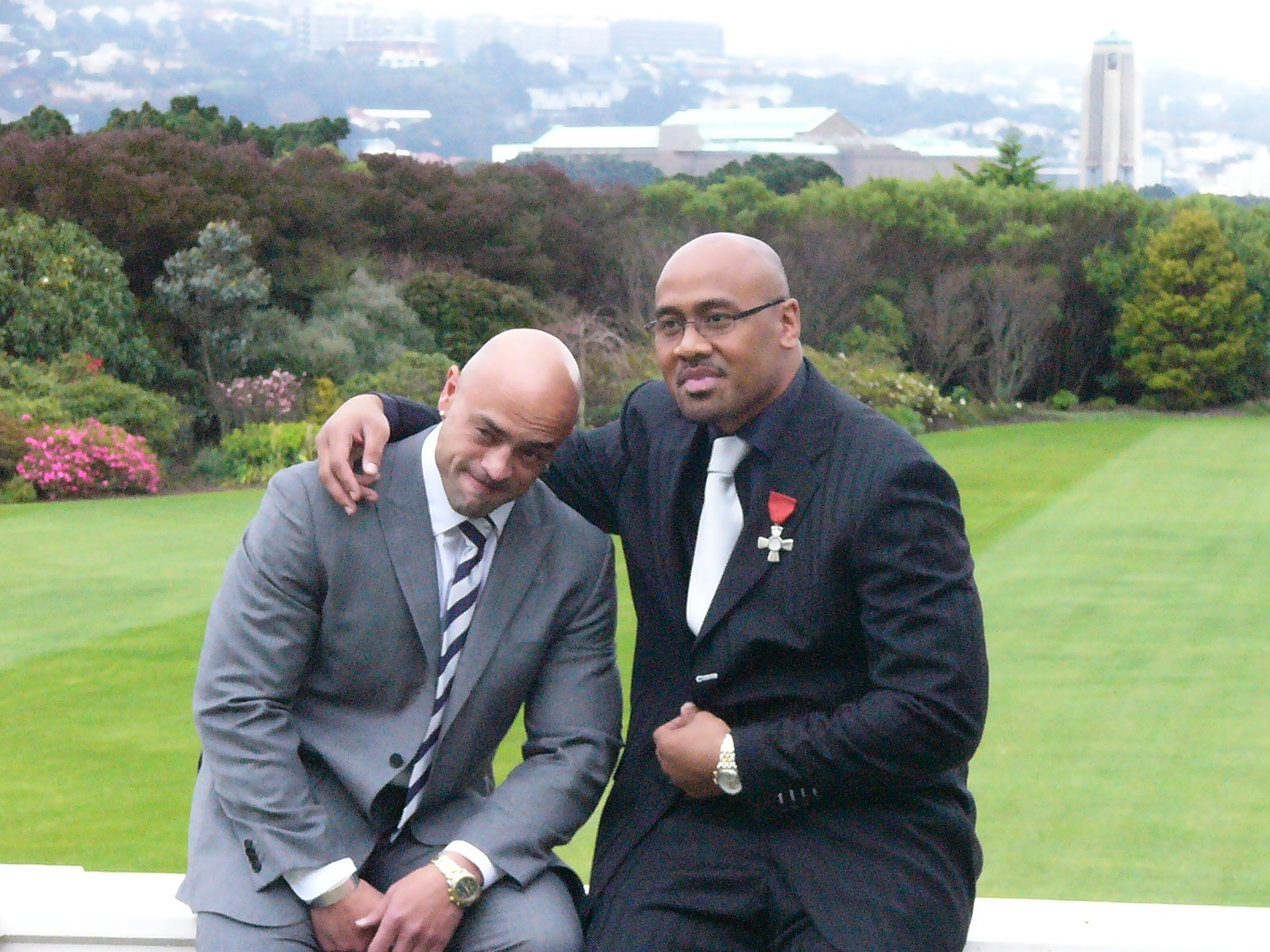
Lomu (right) with Grant Kereama, at Government House, Wellington, on 27 August 2007, following Lomu's investiture as a Member of the New Zealand Order of Merit, for services to rugby

Lomu was diagnosed with nephrotic syndrome, a serious kidney disorder, at the end of 1995. His rugby union career went on hold whilst he was treated. The NZRFU announced in May 2003 that he had been put on dialysis three times a week, due to deterioration in his kidney function. Side effects of Lomu's dialysis treatment led to severe nerve damage in his feet and legs; his doctors warned him that he faced life in a wheelchair if a kidney transplant was not performed soon. He underwent a kidney transplant on 28 July 2004 in Auckland, New Zealand, donated by Wellington radio presenter Grant Kereama.

=== Death ===
Lomu died in Auckland on the morning of 18 November 2015 from a heart attack linked to his kidney disease. The previous night he had returned from the United Kingdom with his family after a short holiday stay in Dubai. He had been receiving dialysis treatments during his visit to the UK, where he was involved in heavy promotional work during the 2015 Rugby World Cup. His first public service was held in his home church in Māngere, Auckland, with his family members in attendance. Two public services were held at Vodafone Events Centre in Manukau on 28 November 2015, and at Eden Park on 30 November 2015, a day before a private service. His death saw widespread tributes to him and his family, from Queen Elizabeth II to a haka performed by the pupils of his boyhood primary school. The New Zealand Parliament passed a national motion in honour of his life.

A month after his death, an independent trust known as the Jonah Lomu Legacy Trust was formed by the New Zealand Rugby Players' Association, to help support his sons.

== Legacy ==
Lomu has been described as one of the greatest athletes not just in the game of rugby, but in sporting history altogether. He has been widely described as the first true global superstar of rugby union and as having a huge impact on the game, with comparisons being drawn with Muhammad Ali, Don Bradman and Tiger Woods. On his game-changing ability, fellow rugby player Kenny Logan stated, "you could talk about Lionel Messi or Cristiano Ronaldo, that's what Jonah was, someone who could change games if you gave him the ball wherever he was". At one time Lomu was considered 'rugby union's biggest drawcard', as his appearance at a match would increase attendance.

Before 1995, wingers were generally fast and good on their feet. Lomu was the first truly massive wing, a trend that has now become standard in many teams. Following his displays at the 1995 Rugby World Cup, in December 1995 Lomu received the BBC Overseas Sports Personality of the Year, an award given to a non-British sportsperson considered to have made the most substantial contribution to a sport each year who has also captured the imagination of the British public. Lomu was also noted for his charity; as a celebrity, he supported Pasifika community efforts and charities such as UNICEF and Kidney Kids NZ.

Lomu was inducted into the International Rugby Hall of Fame on 9 October 2007, and the IRB Hall of Fame on 24 October 2011. He was appointed as a Member of the New Zealand Order of Merit, for services to rugby, in the 2007 Queen's Birthday Honours.

Lomu lent his name to various video games including Jonah Lomu Rugby and Rugby Challenge. He is portrayed by Isaac Fe'aunati in Invictus, a film chronicling Nelson Mandela's journey with the South African rugby team in the 1995 World Cup.

In March 2018, Jonah Lomu Drive, in the Paerata Rise development north of Pukekohe, was named in his honour.

On 16 November 2018, an exhibition rugby match was held at Aberavon Quins RFC to raise funds for the Jonah Lomu Legacy Trust. The game was organised by a local rugby fanatic, Stuart Broad, as a means to thank Lomu for having turned out to play for Aberavon Naval RFC 10 years previously. The event included players from all over Wales, as well as a Welsh male voice choir, a female vocalist, a brass band, Māori war dancers and a fireworks display. It raised £3,500 in aid of the trust set up for Lomu's two sons.

In the 2020s a documentary on the life of Lomu (titled Lomu) was produced. The documentary received NZ$800,000 in funding from the New Zealand Film Commission. Lomu's widow, Nadene Lomu, strongly opposed its production. It premiered on 1 August 2026 in Auckland's Civic Theatre.

In 2024, Lomu was an inaugural inductee into the Pasifika Rugby Hall of Fame.

Awards
| Preceded by Danyon Loader | New Zealand's Sportsman of the Year; 1995 | Succeeded by Danyon Loader |
