= 2013 Festival of World Cups =

- Host countries: England; Wales

The 2013 Festival of World Cups was a series of rugby league world cups held in England during 2013 in the lead up to the 2013 Men's Rugby League World Cup. The festival included the students, police, women, armed forces, and wheelchair world cups.

== Festival schedule ==
Event	Dates	Venues	Winner
Armed Forces	13 July 2013	Colchester Garrison Sports Stadium	Australia
Wheelchair	13 July 2013	Medway Park	France
Student	14 July 2013	4 venues in West Yorkshire; Headingley	Australia
Police	14 July 2013	3 venues in West Yorkshire; Headingley	Australia
Women	14 July 2013	4 venues in West Yorkshire; Headingley	Australia

== Armed Forces ==
The second Armed Forces World Cup took place at the Colchester Garrison Sports Stadium. Four nations competed; Great Britain, Australia, New Zealand and Serbia. The middle weekend of the tournament coincided with the annual military festival held in Colchester.

Group stage
Team	Pld	W	D	L	PF	PA	+/−	Pts
Australia	3	3	0	0	164	38	+126	6
Great Britain	3	2	0	1	146	28	+118	4
New Zealand	3	1	0	2	92	70	+22	2
Serbia	3	0	0	3	6	272	–266	0

Results

30 June:

Great Britain 32 – 8 New Zealand
Australia 112 – 0 Serbia

3 July:

Great Britain 98 – 0 Serbia
Australia 32 – 22 New Zealand

6 July:

Serbia 6 – 62 New Zealand
Great Britain 16 – 20 Australia

=== Finals ===
Semi-finals
1	Australia	110
4	Serbia	0
3	New Zealand	20
2	Great Britain	16

Final
Australia	32
New Zealand	22

13 July 2013

New Zealand	22 - 32	Australia

Colchester Garrison Sports Stadium

== Student ==
The eighth Student Rugby League World Cup were held in July. The eight countries that took part were England, Australia, Ireland, New Zealand, Russia, South Africa, Scotland and Wales.

Group stage games took place at South Leeds Stadium, The Big Fellas Stadium in Featherstone, The LoveRugbyLeague.Com Stadium in Batley and The Tetley’s Stadium in Dewsbury.

14 July 2013

England	16 - 26	Australia

Headingley, Leeds

== Wheelchair ==
2013 Wheelchair Rugby League World Cup
- Number of teams: 6
- Host country: England

Six teams took part in the second Wheelchair Rugby League World Cup which was held at Medway Park, Gillingham. The six teams were France, Australia, England, Scotland, Ireland and Wales.

13 July 2013

France	42 – 40	England

Medway Park Sports Centre, Gillingham

== Police ==
The second Police Rugby League World Cup took place in July. Defending champions Fiji joined hosts Great Britain and Australia in the tournament.

Group stage games took place at The Big Fellas Stadium in Featherstone, Provident Stadium in Bradford and the Tetley's Stadium in Dewsbury. The final took place at the Headingley Carnegie Stadium, Leeds.

Group stage
Team	Pld	W	D	L	PF	PA	+/−	Pts
Australia	2	2	0	0	88	42	+46	4
Fiji	2	1	0	1	96	32	+64	2
Great Britain	2	0	0	2	18	128	-110	0

Results

5 July: Tetley's Stadium

Great Britain 18 – 56 Australia

8 July: Bigfella's Stadium

Fiji 24 – 32 Australia

11 July: Provident Stadium

Great Britain 0 – 72 Fiji

14 July 2013

Australia	18 - 16	Fiji

Headingley, Leeds

== Women ==
The fourth Women's Rugby League World Cup were held in Leeds alongside the student and police World Cups, with the final taking place at Headingley, Leeds. Seven teams took part including three-time defending champions New Zealand as well as hosts England and Australia, France, Russia, Samoa and Tonga.

Group stage games took place at South Leeds Stadium, The Big Fellas Stadium in Featherstone, The LoveRugbyLeague.Com Stadium in Batley and The Tetley’s Stadium in Dewsbury.

14 July 2013

New Zealand	12 - 22	Australia

Headingley, Leeds
