= Rugby League Live 4 =

2017 video game

- Developer: Big Ant Studios
- Publisher: Tru Blu Entertainment
- Series: Rugby League
- Platforms: PlayStation 4; Xbox One; Windows
- Release: PlayStation 4, Xbox One; 28 July 2017; Windows; 13 September 2017
- Genre: Sports
- Modes: Single-player, multiplayer

Rugby League Live 4 is a video game developed by Big Ant and published by Tru Blu, part of the Rugby League video game series. The game was released in 2017. It is available on PlayStation 4, Xbox One and Windows via Steam.

The game is available in Australia, New Zealand, the UK and the U.S., sporting different cover athletes similar to its predecessor, Rugby League Live 3, released in September 2015.

On 1 July 2024, Tru Blu announced that the game, along with Rugby League Live 3, would be removed from sale on all platforms due to its NRL license expiry. The publisher stated that the servers would remain active.

== Commentary ==
Andrew Voss, the commentator of many previous Rugby League video game iterations, returned to fulfill his role, accompanied by newcomer British commentator Eddie Hemmings, who replaced Phil Gus Gould, the commentator in previous Rugby League games. As a result of this, new commentary dialogue was recorded as all previous interactions between Andrew and Phil were scrapped.
