= Grant Nisbett =

New Zealand sports broadcaster (born 1950)

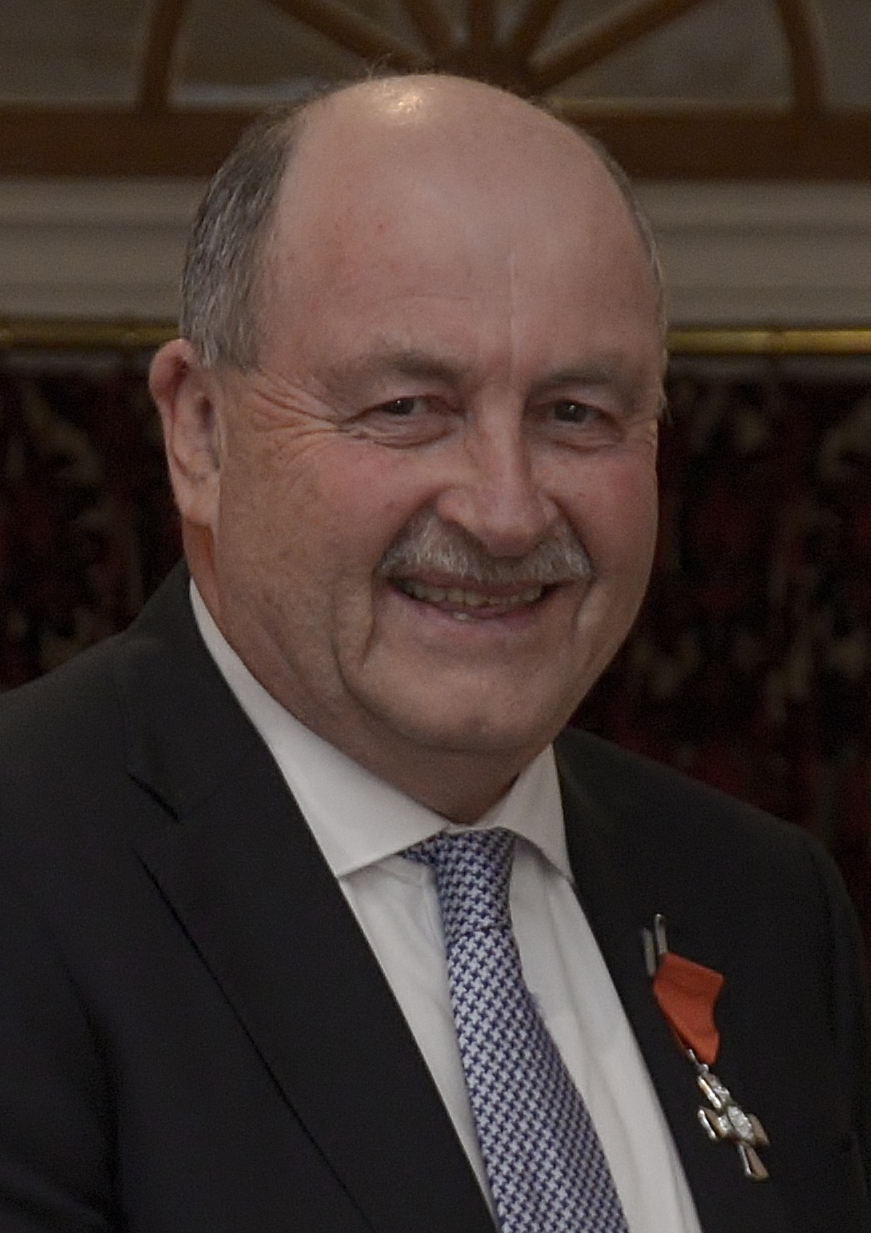
Nisbett in 2018

Grant Wallace Nisbett MNZM (born 26 December 1950) is a New Zealand sports broadcaster and former TAB media liaison. He is the lead rugby commentator for SKY Network Television and called his 300th test match between the All Blacks and France at Westpac Stadium on 16 June 2018. His career spans over 40 years.

Nisbett was educated at Rongotai College in Wellington and captained the 1st XV in 1968. He played No.8 then moved in to prop while playing for his club Poneke in his later years. Nisbett played one first-class match for the Wellington Colts against Horowhenua in 1970. Nisbett also played club cricket to a 'modest level'. His radio career started in 1968 when he chose the NZBC over a physical education degree at Otago University. He frequently tells stories about playing sport on a Saturday, then rushing back to the radio studio to broadcast the weekend's results. Nisbett only played four years of senior rugby before a clash with Saturday sports reporting became too much with his radio career and decided to give his playing days away.

He continued his radio work and his first television commentary was a match between the All Blacks and France at Lancaster Park, Christchurch on 16 June 1984 and the shift to television then signalled a tricky period in his career as the doyen, Keith Quinn, was still on the scene, and in the early 1990s John McBeth also made the switch from radio. Three into one did not go, even if TVNZ initially tried a two-commentator routine, when Quinn and Nisbett called the 1991 World Cup final. Quinn and Nisbett shared matches as the years went on with McBeth more going into a presenting role along with calling a handful of provincial matches.

Nisbett became the lead commentator for rugby and cricket coverage when TVNZ had broadcast rights. When Sky Network Television claimed rights for both sports (rugby in 1996 and cricket in 1998), he then moved to Sky to continue his broadcasting and has been with them ever since. Nisbett is now a weekly commentator for Super Rugby and Mitre 10 Cup matches, All Blacks tests along with domestic and international cricket matches and occasionally softball, bowls and golf over the summer months. He commentated boxing at the 1976 Montreal Olympics and 1980 Moscow Olympics from London.

Nisbett was the lead commentator for Sky Sport during the 2011 Rugby World Cup and called the final with former All Black Grant Fox and former New Zealand cricketer Ian Smith, who was on the sideline. He was one of the Sky Sport commentators at the 2015 Rugby World Cup calling matches for New Zealand viewers along with Smith and former All Blacks Justin Marshall, Jeff Wilson and Andrew Mehrtens. In the 2023 Rugby World Cup he was the lead commentator for Sky Television in New Zealand with Mils Muliaina and Jeff Wilson. He has been to five Rugby World Cups as a broadcaster.

He also attends the All Black End of Year Tours and provides commentary for New Zealand audiences along with Justin Marshall, Tony Johnson or Ian Smith.

Nisbett featured on Radio Trackside's Saturday morning sports programme with former TAB bookmaker Mark Stafford.

He also provides the English commentary on all four Rugby Challenge video games beside Justin Marshall.

He resides in Wellington and is the vice president of the Seatoun Bowling Club. He is husband to the late Toni Nisbett (nee Shaw), and has two daughters, Brooke and Kirstie.

In the 2018 Queen's Birthday Honours, Nisbett was appointed a Member of the New Zealand Order of Merit, for services to sports broadcasting.
