= Into the Dead: Our Darkest Days =

2025 video game

- Developer: PikPok
- Publishers: Boltray Games; PikPok
- Series: Into the Dead
- Engine: Unity 6
- Platforms: Windows; macOS; PlayStation 5; Xbox Series X/S; Nintendo Switch 2
- Release: Early access; 9 April 2025; Full release; March 2027
- Genre: Survival horror
- Mode: Single-player

Into the Dead: Our Darkest Days is a 2.5D side-scrolling survival horror video game developed by PikPok and published by Boltray Games and PikPok. It is a spin-off of the Into the Dead franchise and was released in early access for Microsoft Windows and macOS via Steam on 9 April 2025. The game will leave early access for a full 1.0 release for PC (via Steam, the Epic Games Store, and GeForce Now), PlayStation 5, Xbox Series X/S, and Nintendo Switch 2 in March 2027.

== Setting ==
The game is set in Walton City, Texas, in August 1980 after it has fallen to a zombie outbreak. Its aesthetic is influenced by 1980s culture and horror films, while also touching upon concerns and themes that were prevalent in the era such as societal decay, economic anxiety, and American decline.

== Gameplay ==
The player chooses a duo of survivors with their own traits and background stories to escape the city. These characters can be joined by more survivors found in the game world or die permanently. Survival needs such as health, hunger, energy, sleep, and morale must be managed, as well as resources including food and building materials. Resources are acquired through scavenging during the day and at night. Stealth and stealth kills are prioritised over direct combat. Engaging in open combat generates loud noise, attracting more zombies and quickly wearing down the condition of melee weapons. Guns can be found but are extremely rare.

== Release ==
The official announcement trailer for Into the Dead: Our Darkest Days was released on 15 December 2022. A playable demo was released on Steam on 28 October 2024. It was released in early access for Microsoft Windows and macOS via Steam on 9 April 2025. The developers stated that depending on its success on PC, they hoped to eventually release the game on consoles. On 18 August 2026, it was announced that the game will leave early access and have a full 1.0 release for PC (via Steam, the Epic Games Store, and GeForce Now), PlayStation 5, Xbox Series X/S, and Nintendo Switch 2 in March 2027.

== Reception ==
Early impressions of Into the Dead: Our Darkest Days have been generally positive. Critics have compared its gameplay to This War of Mine and State of Decay. Vice described it as blending both into "an engaging new formula". IGN praised its atmosphere and survivor management mechanics, while noting the early access version hints at but currently lacks a deeper narrative.
