= Wicked Workshop =

Australian video game developer

- Formerly: Wicked Witch
- Type: Subsidiary
- Industry: Video games
- Founded: 2001; 25 years ago
- Founders: Daniel Visser
- Headquarters: Melbourne, Australia
- Parent: Keywords Studios (2021–present)
- Website: wickedworkshop.com.au

Wicked Workshop (formerly Wicked Witch) is an Australian video game developer based in Melbourne. It was founded by Daniel Visser in 2001.

== Games ==
| Title | Year | Platforms | Notes |
|---|---|---|---|
| Town Squared | 2022 | iOS, Android | Published by Playlunch Games |
| AFL Evolution 2 | 2020 | PlayStation 4, Xbox One, Nintendo Switch, Steam | Published by Tru Blu Entertainment |
| Rugby Challenge 4 | 2020 | PlayStation 4, Xbox One, Nintendo Switch, Steam | Published by Tru Blu Entertainment |
| Catapult King | 2020 | Steam | Published by Wicked Witch Software |
| Age of Empires II: Definitive Edition | 2019 | PC | Developed with Forgotten Empires & Tantalus Media. Published by Xbox Game Studios. |
| Jupiter & Mars | 2019 | PlayStation 4, PlayStation VR | Published by Tigertron |
| AFL Evolution - 2018 Season Pack | 2018 | PlayStation 4, Xbox One, Steam | Published by Tru Blu Entertainment |
| Shane Warne: King of Spin | 2017 | Steam | Published by Wicked Witch Software |
| AFL Evolution | 2017 | PlayStation 4, Xbox One, Steam | Published by Tru Blu Entertainment |
| Rugby Challenge 3 | 2016 | PlayStation 4, Xbox One, PlayStation 3, Xbox 360, Steam | Published by Tru Blu Entertainment |
| PuzzleWiz | 2015 | iOS, Android | Published by Wicked Witch Software |
| Warhammer: Snotling Fling | 2015 | iOS, Android | Published by Wicked Witch Software |
| Jet Run: City Defender | 2014 | iOS, Android | Published by Wicked Witch Software |
| AFL Live 2 Season Pack 2014 | 2014 | PlayStation 3, Xbox 360 | Published by Tru Blu Entertainment |
| Whac-a-Mole | 2014 | iOS | Published by Wicked Witch Software |
| AFL Live 2 | 2013 | PlayStation 3, Xbox 360, iOS, Android | Published by Tru Blu Entertainment |
| Rugby League Live 2: Mini Games | 2013 | iOS | Published by Tru Blu Entertainment |
| Rugby League Live 2: Quick Match | 2013 | iOS | Published by Tru Blu Entertainment |
| Rugby League Live 2: Gold Edition | 2013 | iOS | Published by Tru Blu Entertainment |
| Catapult King | 2013 | Android | Published by Wicked Witch Software |
| Jonah Lomu Rugby Challenge: Gold Edition | 2012 | iOS | Published by Tru Blu Entertainment |
| Jonah Lomu Rugby Challenge: Quick Match | 2012 | iOS | Published by Tru Blu Entertainment |
| Jonah Lomu Rugby Challenge: Mini Games | 2012 | iOS | Published by Tru Blu Entertainment |
| AFL Wii: Game of the Year Edition | 2012 | Wii | Published by Tru Blu Entertainment |
| Catapult King | 2012 | iOS | Published by Wicked Witch Software |
| AFL Wii | 2011 | Wii | Published by Tru Blu Entertainment |
| AFL Challenge | 2009 | PSP | Published by Tru Blu Entertainment |
| Rugby League Challenge | 2009 | PSP | Published by Tru Blu Entertainment |
| AFL Mascot Manor | 2009 | Nintendo DS | Published by Tru Blu Entertainment |
| NRL Mascot Mania | 2009 | Nintendo DS | Published by Tru Blu Entertainment |
| AFL Arcade | 2009 | Mobile | Published by Wicked Witch Software |
| NRL Arcade | 2009 | Mobile | Published by Wicked Witch Software |
| World Cup 2010 | 2009 | Mobile | |
| Space Chimps | 2008 | PC | Published by Brash Entertainment |
| AFL Goalkick | 2007 | Mobile | |
| AFL Handball | 2007 | Mobile | |
| Cricket Trivia | 2007 | Mobile | |
| Office Chair Death Race | 2007 | PC, Mobile | |
| Alter Casus | 2007 | Mobile | |
| Karma of Monster | 2007 | Mobile | |
| Super Batsman | 2006 | Mobile | |
| Ultimate Fielder | 2006 | Mobile | |
| Extreme Ball Control | 2006 | Mobile | |
| Tellurian | 2006 | Mobile | |
| Connect | 2006 | Mobile | |
| Turbo Tennis | 2006 | Mobile | |
| Ultimate Puzzles 1001 | 2006 | PC | |
| Ultimate Solitaire 750 | 2004 | PC | |
| Commonwealth Games: Cycling | 2005 | Mobile | |
| Commonwealth Games: Hockey | 2005 | Mobile | |
| Commonwealth Games: Hurdles | 2005 | Mobile | |
| Commonwealth Games: Swimming | 2005 | Mobile | |
| Space Marines 2 | 2005 | Mobile | |
| Coffee House Chaos | 2005 | PC | |
| Bejeweled | 2005 | Mobile | |
| Paperboy | 2005 | Mobile | |
| Bomb Jack | 2005 | Mobile | |
| Allied Assault | 2004 | Mobile | |
| Compass | 2004 | Mobile | |
| Mobile Rally 2 | 2004 | Mobile | |
| Space Marines | 2004 | Mobile | |
| Wicked Football | 2004 | Mobile | |
| Wicked Hockey | 2004 | Mobile | |
| Wicked Racing | 2004 | Mobile | |
| Wicked Footy | 2004 | Mobile | |
| Log Rollin' | 2004 | Mobile | |
| Sachin Tendulker's Duck The Bouncer | 2004 | Mobile | |
| Sachin Tendulker's Fielding Challenge | 2004 | Mobile | |
| Sachin Tendulkar's Tap-O-Thon | 2004 | Mobile | |
| Dolphins Swimming | 2004 | Mobile | |
| Simply English | 2004 | Mobile | |
| Face Messenger | 2004 | Mobile | |
| Ikari Warriors | 2004 | Mobile | |
| Chuckie Egg | 2004 | Mobile | |
| Alien vs. Predator | 2004 | Mobile | |
| Qibla | 2003 | Mobile | |
| Mobile Rally | 2003 | Mobile | |
| Tank Assault | 2003 | Mobile, Nintendo DS | |
| War Monster | 2003 | Game-Boy Color, Mobile, Nintendo DS | |
| War Monster Online | 2003 | Mobile | |
| MTV: The Gimps | 2003 | Mobile | |
| Jumbuck Hockey | 2003 | Mobile | |
| Ryan Giggs Football | 2003 | Mobile | |
| Gothic Graveyard | 2002 | Mobile | |
| Melodie Mars: DJ Battles | 2002 | PC, Mobile | |
| Ned Kelly: The Kelly Gang Adventures | 2002 | Windows | Developed by Wicked Witch Software |
| Mary-Kate and Ashley: Crush Course | 2001 | Game-Boy Color | Developed by Wicked Witch Software, Crawfish Interactive. Published by Ace 2 Games, Acclaim Entertainment |
| Roswell Conspiracies: Aliens, Myths and Legends | 2001 | Game-Boy Color | Developed by Wicked Witch Software, Climax Studios, Crawfish Interactive, Red Storm Entertainment |
