= PikPok =

New Zealand video game developer based in Wellington

Prodigy Design Limited
- Trade name: PikPok
- Formerly: Sidhe (1997–2012)
- Type: Private
- Industry: Video games
- Founded: May 1997
- Founder: Mario Wynands; Tyrone McAuley; Stuart Middleton
- Headquarters: Wellington, New Zealand
- Key people: Mario Wynands; (CEO); Tyrone McAuley; (COO); Stuart Middleton; (CCO); Andy Satterthwaite; (CDO); Karah Sutton; (CPO); Jeremy Burgess; (CTO); Lance Burgess; (CFO)
- Subsidiaries: Wizard Fun Factory
- Website: www.pikpok.com

Prodigy Design Limited, operating as PikPok, is a video game developer and publisher headquartered in Wellington, New Zealand. Their games have been downloaded over 500 million times worldwide across platforms. They primarily develop mobile games, although they have developed for other platforms as well, and they are best known for the zombie-horror franchise Into the Dead.

== History ==
PikPok was established in 1997 under the name Sidhe. Sidhe primarily developed console games for publishers outside of New Zealand. In 2009, Sidhe self-published its first mobile game Shatter. PikPok was formed as the mobile gaming subsidiary of Sidhe, eventually becoming the primary identity of the company.

As of 2023, PikPok was headquartered in Wellington, New Zealand, where it employed over 200 staff. PikPok has also operated a studio in Medellín, Colombia, since the acquisition of studio Wizard Fun Factory in 2022. In 2026, PikPok was named the ASB Exporter of the Year for central New Zealand by ExportNZ "in recognition of its international success and contribution to New Zealand’s wider gaming and interactive media sector."

== Games ==
=== PikPok ===
Year	Title	Platforms	Notes
TBA	Into the Dead 3	TBA	
2027	Into the Dead: Crimson Heights	Meta Quest 3, Meta Quest 3S	
2026	Barbie™ Horse Ride & Rescue	iOS, Android	Windows, macOS, and Nintendo Switch 2 planned for 2027.
2026	Rival Stars Horse Racing	PlayStation 4, PlayStation 5, Xbox Series X/S, Xbox One, Nintendo Switch	
2025	Into the Dead: Our Darkest Days	Windows, macOS	Released in early access on 9 April 2025. Co-published with Boltray Games.
2024	Rival Stars Horse Racing: VR Edition	Meta Quest, Steam VR	Apple Vision Pro version announced but not yet released.
2023	Adventure Friends	iOS, Android	No longer available
2023	My Cat Club	iOS, Android	No longer available
2022	Viking Gods	iOS, Android	
2022	Shatter Remastered	iOS, Android, Windows, PlayStation 4, PlayStation 5, Xbox One, Xbox Series X/S, Nintendo Switch	Original game developed by Sidhe. Remaster published by Netflix. Deluxe published by PikPok.
2021	Greedy Cats	iOS, Android	
2020	Clusterduck	iOS, Android	
2020	Rival Stars Horse Racing: Desktop Edition	Windows, macOS	
2019	Agent Intercept	iOS, macOS, Windows, PlayStation 4, PlayStation 5, Xbox One, Xbox Series X/S, Nintendo Switch	Apple Arcade exclusive at launch. Windows port released on 16 June 2021. Console ports released 30 March 2022.
2019	Rival Stars Horse Racing	iOS, Android	
2019	Zombie Rescue Squad	Browser	
2018	I Am Monster: Idle Destruction	iOS, Android	
2017	Into the Dead 2	iOS, Android, Nintendo Switch	Nintendo Switch port released on 25 October 2019. Unleashed published by Netflix in 2022.
2017	Dungeon, Inc.	iOS, Android	
2016	Rival Stars College Football	iOS, Android	
2016	Shadow Wars	iOS, Android	No longer available
2016	Doomsday Clicker	iOS, Android	
2015	Breakneck	iOS, Android	
2014	Rival Stars Basketball	iOS, Android	
2014	Adventure Xpress	iOS, Android	Published by Adult Swim Games
2014	The Maze Runner	iOS, Android	Developed by Sticky Studios, in partnership with Fox Digital Entertainment. Based on the novel of the same name
2013	Flick Kick Football Legends	iOS, Android	
2013	Halos Fun	iOS, Android	Partnership with Wonderful Halos brand mandarins
2013	Giant Boulder of Death	iOS, Android	Published by Adult Swim Games
2013	Flick Kick Field Goal 2014	iOS, Android	
2013	Turbo Racing League (later renamed Turbo FAST)	iOS, Android, Windows Phone	Partnership with DreamWorks Animation
2013	Robot Unicorn Attack 2	iOS, Android	Published by Adult Swim Games
2012	Into the Dead	iOS, Android, Windows Phone	
2012	OREO: Twist, Lick, Dunk	iOS, Android	Partnership with Oreo
2012	DreamWorks Dash n Drop	iOS, Android	Partnership with DreamWorks Animation
2012	Super Monsters Ate My Condo	iOS, Android	Published by Adult Swim Games
2012	Flick Kick Goalkeeper	iOS	
2012	Velocirapture	iOS	Published by Adult Swim Games
2012	Monster Flip	iOS	developed by Launchpad Games
2012	Extinction Squad	iOS	Published by Adult Swim Games
2012	DreamWorks Dragons: TapDragonDrop	iOS, Android	Partnership with DreamWorks Animation
2012	Flick Kick Ireland	iOS, Android	No longer available
2012	Twang the Fox	iOS, Android	Developed by Conix Games
2011	Flick Kick Aston Villa	iOS	No longer available
2011	Slam Dunk King	iOS	
2011	Own the Game	iOS, Browser	Partnership with Adidas. No longer available.
2011	Monsters Ate My Condo	iOS, Android	Published by Adult Swim Games
2011	Flick Kick Chelsea	iOS	No longer available
2010	Flick Kick Football	iOS	
2010	Flick Kick Field Goal	iOS	
2010	Zen Puzzle Garden	iOS	Developed by Lexaloffle Games
2009	Bird Strike	iOS	No longer available
2009	Flick Kick Aussie Rules	iOS	No longer available
2009	Flick Kick Rugby	iOS	
2009	Fame	iOS	

=== Sidhe ===
Year	Title	Platforms	Notes
2013	Rugby Challenge 2: The Lions Tour Edition	PlayStation 3, Xbox 360, Windows	
2012	Rugby Challenge	PlayStation Vita	
2012	Tap Dragon Drop	iOS	
2011	Rugby Challenge	Xbox 360, PlayStation 3, Windows	
2010	Blood Drive	PlayStation 3, Xbox 360	
2010	Rugby League 3	Wii	
2010	Shatter	Windows, macOS, Linux	
2009	Madagascar Kartz	PlayStation 3, Xbox 360, Wii	
2009	Hot Wheels Battle Force 5	Wii	
2009	Shatter	PlayStation 3	
2008	Rugby League 2: World Cup Edition	PlayStation 2	
2008	Speed Racer: The Videogame	Wii, PlayStation 2	
2007	GripShift	PlayStation Portable, PlayStation 3, Xbox 360	
2007	Jackass: The Game	PlayStation Portable, PlayStation 2	
2006	Melbourne Cup Challenge	PlayStation 2, Xbox, Windows	
2006	Rugby League 2	Xbox	
2005	GripShift	PlayStation Portable	
2005	Rugby League 2	PlayStation 2, Windows	
2003	Rugby League	PlayStation 2, Xbox, Windows	
2003	SpyHunter	Windows	
