= List of Australian rules football video games =

The following is a list of all the video games based on the sport of Australian rules football. For the list of video games about the Arena Football League which also is named AFL, see List of arena football video games.

== Simulation Games ==
Games in which the player can play a full game of Australian rules football, or other arcade-style games with official licenses.

| Name | Developer | Date of Release | Platforms |
|---|---|---|---|
| Australian Rules Football | Clockwize | 1989 | Commodore 64, ZX Spectrum, Amstrad CPC |
| Aussie Rules Footy | Beam Software | 1991 | NES |
| AFL Finals Fever | Blue Tongue Entertainment | 1996 | Microsoft Windows |
| AFL 98 | Electronic Arts | 1998 | Microsoft Windows, PlayStation |
| AFL 99 | Electronic Arts | 1999 | Microsoft Windows, PlayStation |
| AFL Live 2003 | IR Gurus | 2002 | Microsoft Windows, PlayStation 2, Xbox |
| AFL Live 2004 | IR Gurus | 2003 | Microsoft Windows, PlayStation 2, Xbox |
| AFL Live: Premiership Edition | IR Gurus | 2004 | Microsoft Windows, PlayStation 2, Xbox |
| AFL Premiership 2005 | IR Gurus | 2005 | Microsoft Windows, PlayStation 2, Xbox |
| AFL Premiership 2006 | IR Gurus | 2006 | PlayStation 2 |
| AFL Premiership 2007 | IR Gurus | 2007 | PlayStation 2 |
| AFL Mascot Manor | Wicked Witch Software | 2009 | Nintendo DS |
| AFL Challenge | Wicked Witch Software | 2009 | PlayStation Portable |
| AFL Live | Big Ant Studios | 2011 | PlayStation 3, Xbox 360 |
| AFL | Wicked Witch Software | 2011 | Wii |
| AFL: Gold Edition | Wicked Witch Software | 2011, 2012 | iOS |
| AFL Live: Game of the Year Edition | Big Ant Studios | 2012 | Microsoft Windows, PlayStation 3, Xbox 360 |
| AFL: Game of the Year Edition | Wicked Witch Software | 2012 | Wii |
| AFL Live 2 | Wicked Witch Software | 2013 | PlayStation 3, Xbox 360 |
| AFL Evolution | Wicked Witch Software | 2017 | PlayStation 4, Xbox One, Microsoft Windows |
| AFL Evolution 2 | Wicked Witch Software | 2020 | PlayStation 4, Xbox One, Nintendo Switch, Microsoft Windows |
| AFL 23 | Big Ant Studios | 2023 | PlayStation 4, PlayStation 5, Xbox One, Xbox Series X/S, Microsoft Windows |
| AFL 26 | Big Ant Studios | 2025 | PlayStation 4, PlayStation 5, Xbox One, Xbox Series X/S, Nintendo Switch 2, Microsoft Windows |

== Management Games ==
The following games allow the player to manage a team without actually playing the game.

| Name | Developer | Date of Release | Platforms |
|---|---|---|---|
| Kevin Sheedy AFL Coach 2002 | IR Gurus | 2001 | Microsoft Windows |
| Premiership Coach 2010 | Southern Cross Studios | 2010 | Microsoft Windows |
| Premiership Coach 2011 | Southern Cross Studios | 2011 | Microsoft Windows |
| Australian Football Coach | Statto Software | 2014 | Microsoft Windows |
| Australian Football Coach 2020 | Statto Software | 2020 | Microsoft Windows, MacOS, Linux |
| Australian Football Coach 2023-24 | Statto Software | 2023 | Microsoft Windows, MacOS, Linux |

== Arcade Games ==
The following games forgo the Simulation-style gameplay for something more arcade like with over-the-top gameplay and easy to pick up and play controls. These games also forgo official licenses.

| Name | Developer | Date of Release | Platforms |
|---|---|---|---|
| Pro Jank Footy | Powerbomb Games | 2026 | PlayStation 5, Xbox Series X/S, Nintendo Switch, Nintendo Switch 2, Microsoft Windows |

== See also ==
- Australian rules football
- List of rugby union video games
