= Australian Football League =

Australian rules football competition

- Most recent season or competition: 2026 AFL season
- AFL logo since the 2000 season
- Formerly: Victorian Football League (VFL; 1897–1990)
- Sport: Australian rules football
- Founded: 2 October 1896; 130 years ago
- First season: 1897
- CEO: Andrew Dillon
- No. of teams: 18
- Headquarters: Melbourne, Victoria, Australia
- Region: Australia
- Current premiers: Brisbane; (6th premiership)
- Most premierships: Carlton; Collingwood; Essendon; (16 premierships)
- Broadcasters: Australia: Seven Network; Fox Footy; New Zealand: Sky Sport; International: (full list)
- Streaming partners: 7plus (Australia); Kayo Sports (Australia); WatchAFL (overseas)
- Sponsor: Toyota
- Domestic cups: AFL Women's; VFL; SANFL; WAFL; SFL; NTFA; NWFL; NTFL; QAFL; AFL Sydney; AFL Canberra
- International cup: Australian Football International Cup
- Website: www.afl.com.au

The Australian Football League (AFL) is the pre-eminent professional competition of Australian rules football. It was originally named the Victorian Football League (VFL) (Note: Not to be confused with the modern day Victorian Football League, which formerly existed as the Victorian Football Association.) and was founded in 1896 as a breakaway competition from the Victorian Football Association (VFA), with its inaugural season in 1897. It changed its name to the Australian Football League in 1990 after expanding its competition to other Australian states in the 1980s. The AFL publishes its laws of Australian football, which are used, with variations, by other Australian rules football organisations.

The AFL competition currently consists of 18 teams spread across Australia's five mainland states, with Tasmania to join the league as the 19th team ahead of the 2028 season. AFL premiership season matches have been played in all states and mainland territories, in addition to in New Zealand and China to further expand its audience. As of 2024, the AFL is the richest Australian football and overall sports league in Australia by revenue and the 16th richest sports league in the world by revenue.

The AFL premiership season currently consists of a 24-match regular (or home-and-away) season, which typically runs from March to September. The team with the best record at the end of the home and away season is awarded the minor premiership; the top ten teams subsequently play off in a five-round finals series, culminating in the AFL Grand Final, held at the Melbourne Cricket Ground (MCG) each year. The grand final winners are termed the premiers, the most important team prizes for which are the premiership cup and flag. Carlton, Collingwood and Essendon are the joint-most successful clubs in the competition, having each won 16 premierships. The Brisbane Lions are the reigning premiers, defeating the Fremantle in the 2026 AFL Grand Final to win a third consecutive premiership.

== History ==
=== VFL era (1897–1989) ===
==== Background and founding ====
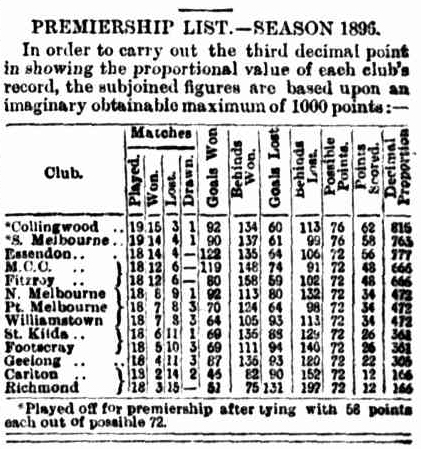
The final standing of the 1896 VFA ladder. Collingwood, Essendon, Fitzroy, Geelong, Melbourne, South Melbourne, Carlton and St Kilda would form the VFL the following year.

Several of the AFL's current member clubs date back to the origins of Australian football and were instrumental in establishing the sport's popularity and the AFL. The oldest club is Melbourne Football Club, which wrote the first laws of the code, and Geelong, which date back to 1858 and 1859 respectively, while Melbourne University, also founded in 1859, is also one of the oldest clubs to have later participated in the competition.

The Victorian Football Association (VFA) was established in 1877 and quickly went on to become Victoria's football competition. During the 1890s, an off-field power struggle occurred between the VFA's stronger and weaker clubs, the former seeking greater administrative control commensurate with their relative financial contribution to the game. This came to a head in 1896 when it was proposed that gate profits, which were always lower in matches involving the weaker clubs, be shared equally among all teams in the VFA. After it was intimated that the proposal would be put to a vote, six of the strongest clubs—Collingwood, Essendon, Fitzroy, Geelong, Melbourne and South Melbourne—seceded from the VFA and later invited Carlton and St Kilda to join them in founding a new competition, the Victorian Football League (VFL). The remaining VFA clubs—Footscray, North Melbourne, Port Melbourne, Richmond and Williamstown—were given the opportunity to compete as junior sides at a level beneath the VFL but rejected the offer and remained for the 1897 VFA season.

==== 1897–1900s: Inaugural VFL season and early years ====
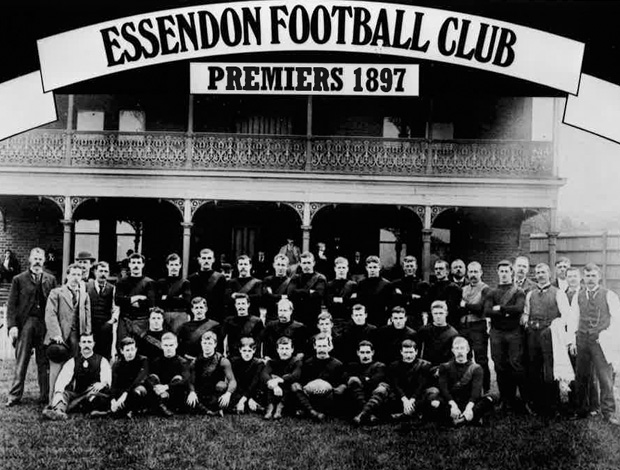
Essendon won the inaugural VFL premiership by finishing on top of the 1897 round robin finals ladder. A new finals system was implemented during the 1898 VFL season in order that a final match, or "grand final", should determine the premiers.

The VFL's inaugural season occurred in 1897. It made several innovations early on to entice the public's interest, including an annual finals tournament, rather than awarding the premiership to the team with the best record through the season; and, the formal establishment of the modern scoring system, in which six points are awarded for a goal and one point for a behind.

Although the VFL and the VFA continued to compete for spectator interest for many years, the VFL quickly established itself as the premier competition in Victoria. In 1908, the league expanded to ten teams, with Richmond crossing from the VFA and University Football Club from the Metropolitan Junior Football Association. Professionalism began from the 1911 season, with clubs permitted to pay players beyond the reimbursement of expenses for the first time. University, after three promising seasons, finished last each year from 1911 until 1914, including losing 51 matches in a row, in part caused by its players' focus on their studies rather than football and in part because it had chosen to remain amateur; as a result, the club withdrew from the VFL at the end of 1914.

The premiers of the Victorian Football League and the premiers of the South Australian Football League met in playoff matches for the Championship of Australia beginning in 1888, with a 3-game playoff between South Melbourne from the VFL and Norwood from the SAFA. Matches where then held sporadically during the 1890s as single game playoffs and then annually from 1907 until 1914 (except 1912). South Australian clubs won 8 of the 11 titles, with Port Adelaide being the most successful, having won four titles in 1890, 1910, 1913 and 1914. The majority of the matches were held in South Australia at Adelaide Oval. Following the outbreak of World War 1 the Championship playoff ceased and wasn't revived until 1968.

==== 1915–1945: Three VFA clubs join the VFL ====
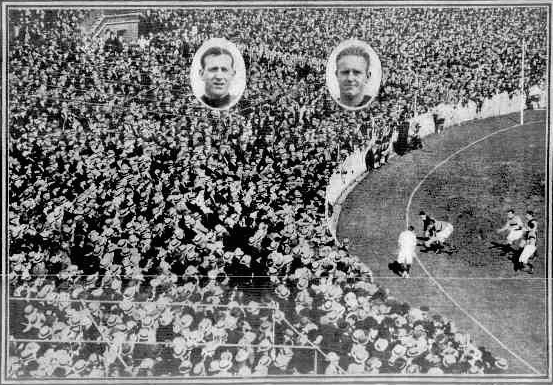
In 1924, Footscray, the premiers of the VFA, defeated Essendon, the VFL premiers, in the Championship of Victoria. The result played a large part in Footscray, Hawthorn and North Melbourne gaining entry into the VFL the following year.

In 1916, district football was introduced, meaning new players from metropolitan Melbourne were allocated to clubs based on residential address. In 1925, the VFL expanded from nine teams to twelve, with Footscray, Hawthorn and North Melbourne each crossing from the VFA. North Melbourne and Hawthorn remained very weak in the VFL for a very long period. Although North Melbourne would become the first of the 1925 expansion sides to reach a grand final in 1950, initially it was Footscray that adapted to the VFL with the most ease of the three clubs and by 1928 were well off the bottom of the ladder.

From 1927 to 1930, Collingwood became the first, and as of 2025, the only VFL/AFL team to win four successive premierships.

==== 1946–1975: Post-war golden years ====
In 1952, the VFL hosted a national day, when all six matches were played outside Melbourne. Matches were played at the Sydney Cricket Ground, Brisbane Exhibition Ground, North Hobart Oval, Albury Sports Ground and Victorian country towns Yallourn and Euroa.

Footscray became the first of the 1925 expansion teams to win the premiership in 1954.

Melbourne became a powerhouse during the 1950s and early 1960s under coach Norm Smith and star player Ron Barassi. The club contested seven consecutive grand finals from 1954 to 1960, winning five premierships, including three in a row from 1955 to 1957. The became the only club to win the minor premiership 6 times in a row from 1955 to 1960.

Television coverage for the VFL commenced in 1957 with direct telecasts of the final quarter permitted. At first, several channels competed through broadcasting different games. However, when the VFL found that television coverage had reduced crowds, it decided that no television coverage was to be allowed for 1960. In 1961 television replays in Melbourne were introduced although direct telecasts were rarely permitted, compared with the rest of Australia where live telecasts happened every Saturday afternoon.

In 1959, the VFL planned the first purpose-built mega-stadium, VFL Park (later known as Waverley Park), to give it some independence from the Melbourne Cricket Club, which managed the Melbourne Cricket Ground. VFL Park was planned to hold 155,000 spectators, which would have made it one of the largest stadiums in the world – although it would ultimately be built with a capacity of 78,000. Land for the stadium was purchased at Mulgrave, then farmland but predicted to be near the demographic centre of Melbourne's population.

The VFL premiership trophy was first awarded in addition to a pennant flag in 1959; essentially the same trophy design has been in use since.

VFL Logo used from 1972 to 1975

In the 1960s, television coverage began to have a huge impact on the VFL. Spectators hurried home from games to watch replays and many former players took up positions as commentators on pre-game preview programs and post-game review programs. There were also several attempts at variety programs featuring VFL players, who generally succeeded in demonstrating that their skills were limited to the football ground.

The VFL played the first of a series of exhibition matches in 1962 in an effort to lift the international profile of the league. In 1967, district football was expanded throughout all of Victoria, clubs now allocated a country zone in addition to their metropolitan districts.

The 1970 season saw the opening of VFL Park, with the inaugural match being played between Geelong and Fitzroy, on 18 April 1970. Construction work was carried out at the stadium as the 1970s progressed, culminating in the building of the now heritage listed Sir Kenneth Luke Stand. Queen Elizabeth II, was a guest at the game and formally opened the stadium to the public. The 1970 grand final between traditional rivals Carlton and Collingwood, arguably the league's most famous game, saw Carlton recover from a 44-point deficit at half-time to win the game by 10 points, featured a famous spectacular mark by Alex Jesaulenko and was witnessed by a record crowd of 121,696.

==== 1976–1981: VFL leaves Australian National Football Council ====
In 1976, the National Football League, which was the peak national administrative body of Australian rules football at the time, established the NFL Night Series to succeed the Championship of Australia. The Night Series was played concurrently with the premiership season and was contested among twelve clubs from the VFL, SANFL and WAFL, invited based on their finishing positions from the previous year. The event was mostly played on Tuesday nights, with night games at Norwood Oval in Adelaide and all games were televised live in colour on Channel 9, which opened up unprecedented revenue streams from television rights and sponsorship opportunities for the sport. The NFL began plans to expand its Night Series to incorporate more teams from the VFL, SANFL and WAFL, as well as state representative teams from other states.

In November 1976, the VFL announced that it was withdrawing from the NFL's competition, having arranged more substantial television and sponsorship deals for its own, rival night competition for 1977 to be based in Melbourne and feature only the VFL clubs. Light towers were erected at VFL Park specifically for the event. The VFL established a proprietary limited company called Australian Football Championships Pty Ltd in 1978 to run its night competition and offered shareholdings to the other state leagues in an attempt to lure other states into the competition.

For the three years from 1977 until 1979, the NFL and VFL night competitions were run separately as rival night competitions. In 1978, the Tasmanian representative team competed in both the NFL and VFL night competitions but all SANFL and WAFL clubs and the minor states teams remained in the NFL Night Series. In 1979, the WAFL clubs and the New South Wales and A.C.T. representative teams defected from the NFL Night Series and joined the VFL's night competition, leaving the NFL Night Series mostly composed of SANFL teams. The NFL Night Series was not revived in 1980 and the SANFL clubs joined the VFL's night competition. Although the NFL itself continued to exist as an administrative body into the early 1990s, the power gained by the VFL as a result of its take-over of night competition was one of the first significant steps in the VFL's spread interstate and ultimately its take-over and control of Australian football across Australia.

VFL Logo used from 1973 to 1989

In 1980 and 1981, the first years after the NFL Night Series ended, the VFL night competition was at its largest, with all VFL, WAFL and SANFL clubs plus the four minor states' teams (selected under residential qualification rather than state of origin qualification) competing for a total of 34 teams. In 1982, the size of the competition was reduced and, thereafter, only the top two or three teams from the SANFL and WAFL, as well as the winner of the minor states' annual carnival were invited.

In 1987, the night competition reverted to include only the VFL teams. The competition was pushed earlier into the year, with the final played on 28 April. The following season, the competition did not overlap with the day premiership season at all and became entirely a pre-season competition. The night competition is generally considered to be of equivalent importance as the pre-season competition and the VFL Night Series (1956–1971) and records relating to the three competitions are often combined.

With the number of players recruited from country leagues increasing, the wealthier VFL clubs were gaining an advantage that metropolitan zoning and the Coulter law (salary cap) restricting player payments had prevented in the past. Country zoning was introduced in the late 1960s and while it pushed Essendon and Geelong from the top of the ladder, it created severe inequality during the 1970s and 1980s. Between 1972 and 1987, only six of the league's twelve clubs – Carlton, Collingwood, Essendon, Hawthorn, North Melbourne and Richmond – played in grand finals.

==== 1982–1989: Professionalism, club bankruptcy and expansion ====
Evolution of competition
Year	States	Salary cap	Average salary	TV rights per year	Draft	Zoning
1980	· Victoria	none	$11,100 (equivalent to $53,142 in 2022)	$601,000 (equivalent to $2,898,675 in 2022)	no	yes
1991	· Victoria · South Australia · West Australia · New South Wales · Queensland	$1,600,000 (equivalent to $3,221,426 in 2022)	$46,430 (equivalent to $99,714 in 2022)	$7,000,000 (equivalent to $12,885,702 in 2022)	yes	

The 1980s was a period of significant structural change in Australian football around the country. The VFL was dominant among the Australian football leagues around the country in terms of overall attendance, interest and money and began to look towards expanding its influence directly into other states. The VFL and its top clubs were asserting their financial power to recruit top players from interstate. The resulting rising cost pressures drove the VFL's weaker clubs into dire financial situations. The South Melbourne Swans became the first VFL team to relocate interstate. The South Melbourne Football Club was deeply indebted, including to the VFL which took over the club's Swans team and moved the team's home games to Sydney in 1982 and renamed the team the Sydney Swans the following year. Under the private ownership of Dr Geoffrey Edelsten during the mid-1980s, the Sydney Swans became successful on-field. Moving the Swans team to Sydney effectively shifted the debts of a Melbourne club onto Australian football in Sydney and re-directed support and finance to the Swans team to the detriment of existing Australian Football clubs and league competitions in Sydney. However, the Swans team attracted new prominence and supporters for the sport. Despite becoming successful on the field, a succession of owners and transfer to its supporter "members", the Sydney Swans remain indebted to the AFL and subject to its veto control and reversion rights in what became a model for the AFL control of teams.

Throughout the 1980s, approaches were made by SANFL and WAFL clubs to enter the VFL. Of particular note were approaches by the East Perth Royals in 1980, the Norwood Redlegs in 1986 and 1988, and an East–South Fremantle merger proposal in 1987. None of these attempts were successful despite Norwood trying again in 1990 and 1994.

In 1986, the West Australian Football League and Queensland Australian Football League were awarded licences to field expansion teams in the VFL, leading to the establishment of the clubs in Brisbane and Perth (Brisbane Bears and West Coast Eagles), who both joined the league in 1987. These expansion team licences were awarded on payment of multimillion-dollar fees which were not required of the existing VFL clubs. In 1989 financial troubles nearly forced Footscray and Fitzroy to merge but fees paid by the Brisbane Bears and West Coast Eagles, propped up the struggling VFL sides.

The 1980s first saw new regular timeslots for VFL matches. VFL matches had previously been played on Saturday afternoons but Sydney began playing its home matches on Sunday afternoons and North Melbourne pioneered playing matches on Friday night. These have since become regular timeslots for all teams.

The first national draft was introduced in 1986 and a salary cap was introduced in 1987. District football within Victoria was discontinued around the same time.

=== AFL era (1990–present) ===
AFL Logo used from 1990 to 1999

The league was renamed the Australian Football League in 1990 to reflect its national composition.

==== 1990–2010: A professional national competition ====
In 1990 the AFLPA, the players union, signed its first Collective Bargaining Agreement (CBA) with the league which outlined wages and conditions in what was becoming a sole source of income for players who had previously had part-time or full-time jobs outside of football. Functionally, the AFL gave up control over its Victorian-based minor grades at the end of 1991 – clubs continued to field reserves teams in a competition run by the new Victorian State Football League and the under-19s competition and zone-based recruiting were abolished and replaced with an independent system.

Midway through 1990, the SANFL's most successful club, Port Adelaide, made a bid for an AFL licence. In response, the SANFL gained an injunction via Glenelg and Norwood against Port Adelaide, allowing it time to establish a composite South Australian team called the Adelaide Crows, which was awarded the licence and joined the league in 1991 as the fourth non-Victorian club. The same year saw the West Coast Eagles become the first non-Victorian club to reach the grand final, which was won by Hawthorn (the same year saw the Brisbane Bears win the reserves premiership). The Eagles would then win the premiership in 1992 and 1994. In 1994, Fremantle obtained an AFL licence and joined the AFL in 1995, becoming the fifth non-Victorian club, and the second from Western Australia.

The VFA took over the Victorian Football League name in 1996. In 1996 several Victorian clubs were in severe financial difficulties, most notably Fitzroy and Hawthorn. Hawthorn proposed to merge with Melbourne to form the Melbourne Hawks but the merger ultimately fell through and both teams continued as separate entities. Fitzroy, however, was too weak to continue by itself. The club nearly merged with North Melbourne to form the Fitzroy-North Melbourne Kangaroos but the other clubs voted against it. In 1994 Port Adelaide was awarded an AFL licence but could not enter until a Victorian team had folded or merged. At the end of 1996 Fitzroy played its last match and merged with Brisbane to form the Brisbane Lions. This allowed Port Adelaide to enter the AFL for the 1997 season as the sixth and only pre-existing non Victorian club.

Through the 1990s there was a significant trend of Melbourne-based teams abandoning the use of their small (20,000–30,000 capacity) suburban venues for home matches in favour of the MCG and VFL Park, which have and had larger seating capacities. The 1990s saw the last matches played at Windy Hill (Essendon), Moorabbin Oval (St Kilda), Western Oval (Footscray) and Victoria Park (Collingwood) and saw Princes Park abandoned by its long-term co-tenant, Hawthorn. The transition to the use of only two venues in Melbourne was ultimately completed in 2005 when Carlton abandoned the use of Princes Park. In 1999, the league sold VFL Park and used the funds in a joint venture to begin construction of a brand-new stadium situated at Melbourne's Docklands. Representative state football came to an end, with the last State of Origin match held in 1999.

==== 2011–present: 18-team era ====
In the late 2000s, the AFL looked to establish a permanent presence in Gold Coast, Queensland, which was fast-developing as a major population centre. North Melbourne, which was in financial difficulty and had played a few home games on the Gold Coast in previous years, was offered significant subsidies to relocate to the Gold Coast but declined.
The AFL then began work to establish a club on the Gold Coast as a new expansion team.

Early in 2008, a meeting held by the AFL discussed having two new teams enter the AFL competition. In March 2008, the AFL won the support of the league's 16 club presidents to establish sides on the Gold Coast and in Western Sydney. The Gold Coast Suns were established and joined the AFL in 2011 as the 17th team. The Greater Western Sydney Giants, representing both Western Sydney and Canberra, were then established and entered the league as the 18th team in 2012.

On 25 April 2013 the Westpac Stadium in Wellington, New Zealand hosted the first ever Australian Football League game played for premiership points outside Australia. The night game between St Kilda and Sydney was played in front of a crowd of 22,183 on Anzac Day to honour the Anzac bond between the two countries.

A national women's league comprising a subset of AFL clubs began in 2017. Thirteen AFL clubs placed bids to participate in the women's competition. Eight clubs – Adelaide, Brisbane Lions, Carlton, Collingwood, Fremantle, Greater Western Sydney, Melbourne and the Western Bulldogs – were granted licences to participate in the inaugural season. Six clubs joined the league in the coming years; Geelong and North Melbourne entered the competition in 2019, while Gold Coast, Richmond, St Kilda and West Coast made their debut in 2020. The remaining four clubs—Essendon, Hawthorn, Port Adelaide and Sydney— entered AFL Women's in the seventh season in 2022.

On 14 May 2017, Port Adelaide and the Gold Coast played the first-ever AFL match for premiership points in Shanghai, China, attracting a crowd of 10,114 at Jiangwan Stadium. Port Adelaide won the game by 72 points.

In 2020, the AFL season was severely disrupted by the COVID-19 pandemic. The first round of matches was played in front of no crowds due to the pandemic, before the season was suspended on 22 March due to health concerns and strict government regulations on non-essential travel. After nearly two months of planning with the assistance of state governments and health officials, the season resumed on 11 June, with the length of the season reduced from 22 matches per team to 17 matches. The grand final was played in October at The Gabba in Brisbane, the first time it was held outside of Victoria since the creation of the league due to the spiking cases in that state. The pandemic caused the league to lose out on up to $400 million in anticipated revenue and also precipitated a 20% cut in industry jobs.

The 2021 grand final was played in September at Perth Stadium in Perth because an ongoing COVID-19 lockdown prevented the match from being played with spectators at the Melbourne Cricket Ground in Melbourne, Victoria. It was the first grand final played in Perth and the second consecutive grand final to be played outside Victoria. The event set a new attendance record for Australian rules football in Western Australia, eclipsing the previous record set in 2018 despite not featuring any WA-based teams and being played during the COVID pandemic.

== Clubs ==
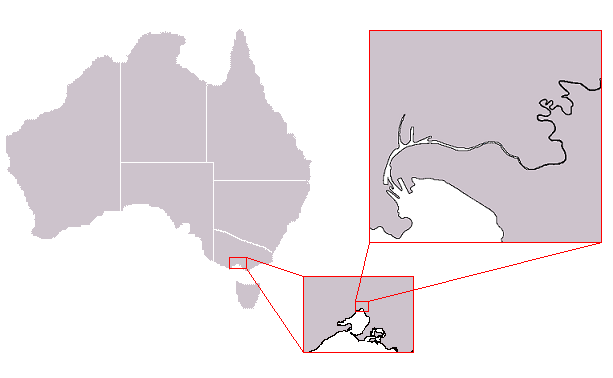

The AFL operates on a single table system, with no divisions and conferences, nor promotion and relegation from other leagues.

The league was founded as the Victorian Football League (VFL) in 1897, comprising eight teams only based in the state of Victoria. Over the next century, a series of expansions, a relocation, a merger and a club withdrawal saw the league's teams expand to the 18 teams there are today.

In 1990, the national nature of the competition resulted in the name change to the Australian Football League (AFL). The current 18 teams are based across five states of Australia; the majority (ten) still remain in Victoria, nine of which are located in the Melbourne metropolitan area. The states of New South Wales, Queensland, South Australia and Western Australia have two teams each, and a team from Tasmania will enter the competition in 2028.

The Australian Capital Territory and Northern Territory are the only mainland territories not to have AFL clubs, although the Greater Western Sydney Giants have a contract to play at least three home games in Canberra until 2032, while at least two games per year are played in Darwin.

=== Current clubs ===
Club	Colours	Moniker	State	Home venue	2026 members	Est.	Former league	VFL/AFL seasons		VFL/AFL premierships	
Club	Colours	Moniker	State	Home venue	2026 members	Est.	Former league	First	Total	Total	Most recent
Adelaide		Crows	South Australia	Adelaide Oval	86,307	1990	—	1991	36	2	1998
Brisbane Lions		Lions	Queensland	The Gabba	85,103	1996	—	1997	30	6	2026
Carlton		Blues	Victoria	Marvel Stadium	97,427	1864	VFA	1897^{+}	130	16	1995
Collingwood		Magpies	Victoria	Melbourne Cricket Ground	114,976	1892	VFA	1897^{+}	130	16	2023
Essendon		Bombers	Victoria	Marvel Stadium	83,842	1872	VFA	1897^{+}	128^{†}	16	2000
Fremantle		Dockers	Western Australia	Optus Stadium	74,698	1994	—	1995	32	0	—
Geelong		Cats	Victoria	GMHBA Stadium	94,006	1859	VFA	1897^{+}	127^{†}	10	2022
Gold Coast		Suns	Queensland	People First Stadium	33,470	2009	—	2011	16	0	—
Greater Western Sydney		Giants	New South Wales	Engie Stadium	38,395	2010	—	2012	15	0	—
Hawthorn		Hawks	Victoria	Melbourne Cricket Ground	92,095	1902	VFA	1925	102	13	2015
Melbourne		Demons	Victoria	Melbourne Cricket Ground	65,088	1858	VFA	1897^{+}	127^{†}	13	2021
North Melbourne		Kangaroos	Victoria	Marvel Stadium	60,274	1869	VFA	1925	102	4	1999
Port Adelaide		Power	South Australia	Adelaide Oval	75,668	1870	SANFL	1997	30	1	2004
Richmond		Tigers	Victoria	Melbourne Cricket Ground	92,648	1885	VFA	1908	119	13	2020
St Kilda		Saints	Victoria	Marvel Stadium	77,400	1873	VFA	1897^{+}	128^{†}	1	1966
Sydney		Swans	New South Wales^	Sydney Cricket Ground	80,558	1874	VFA	1897^{+}	129^{†}	5	2012
West Coast		Eagles	Western Australia	Optus Stadium	115,324	1986	—	1987	40	4	2018
Western Bulldogs		Bulldogs	Victoria	Marvel Stadium	61,717	1877	VFA	1925	102	2	2016
^ denotes that the club relocated from a different state at some point in its existence^{+} denotes that the club was a founding member of the VFL^{†} denotes that the club did not participate in one or more seasons due to one or both of the World Wars

=== Future clubs ===
Club	Colours	Moniker	State	Home venue	Expected first season
Tasmania		Devils	Tasmania	Macquarie Point Stadium	2028

=== Former clubs ===
Since the league commenced in 1897 as the VFL, only one club, University, has withdrawn from the competition. It last competed in 1914 and withdrew because, as an amateur club, it was unable to remain competitive in a time when player payments were becoming common; the club still competes to this day in the Victorian Amateur Football Association (VAFA). Two other clubs, Fitzroy and the Brisbane Bears, merged in 1996 to form the Brisbane Lions: however, after coming out of financial administration in 1998, Fitzroy resumed its playing operations in 2009 and competes in the VAFA.

Club	Colours	Moniker	State	Home venue	Est.	Former league	VFL/AFL seasons			VFL/AFL premierships	
Club	Colours	Moniker	State	Home venue	Est.	Former league	First	Last	Total	Total	Last
Brisbane Bears		Bears	Queensland	Carrara Stadium	1986	—	1987	1996	10	0	—
Fitzroy		Lions	Victoria	Brunswick Street Oval	1883	VFA	1897^{+}	1996	100	8	1944
University		Students	Victoria	Melbourne Cricket Ground	1859	MJFA	1908	1914	7	0	—
^{+} denotes that the club was a founding member of the VFL

=== Timeline ===
Non-formal/junior competitions †
Victorian Football Association (1877) †
Victorian Football League (1897, later renamed AFL)
Australian Football League (1990, formerly VFL)
South Australian National Football League (1877) †

† Not all teams shown. These competitions are current.

== Venues ==
Throughout the history of the VFL/AFL to 2026, there have been 52 grounds used. The largest-capacity ground in use is the Melbourne Cricket Ground (MCG), which has a capacity of over 100,000 people and hosts the grand final each year (see AFL Grand Final location debate). The MCG is shared by six teams as a home ground, while the other grounds used as home venues by multiple teams are Docklands Stadium in Melbourne (five teams), Adelaide Oval in Adelaide (two teams) and Perth Stadium in Perth (two teams). The AFL has had exclusive ownership of Docklands Stadium (commercially known as Marvel Stadium) since late 2016.

Prior to the expansion of the competition, most grounds were located in suburban Melbourne, with Princes Park, Victoria Park, the Junction Oval, Waverley Park and the Lake Oval each having hosted over 700 games. However, since the introduction of a national competition, each state and territory of Australia has hosted AFL games. On 25 April 2013 (Anzac Day), a match took place between St Kilda and Sydney at Wellington Regional Stadium in Wellington, New Zealand, being the first AFL match played outside Australia for premiership points.

=== Current venues ===
Below are the venues that are hosting AFL matches during the 2025 season.

Melbourne Cricket Ground	Optus Stadium	Marvel Stadium	Adelaide Oval
Melbourne, Victoria	Perth, Western Australia	Melbourne, Victoria	Adelaide, South Australia
Capacity: 100,024	Capacity: 61,266	Capacity: 56,347	Capacity: 53,500
Sydney Cricket Ground	GMHBA Stadium	The Gabba	People First Stadium
Sydney, New South Wales	Geelong, Victoria	Brisbane, Queensland	Gold Coast, Queensland
Capacity: 48,000	Capacity: 40,000	Capacity: 37,000	Capacity: 25,000
Engie Stadium	Ninja Stadium	University of Tasmania Stadium	Manuka Oval
Sydney, New South Wales	Hobart, Tasmania	Launceston, Tasmania	Canberra, Australian Capital Territory
Capacity: 23,500	Capacity: 19,500	Capacity: 15,615	Capacity: 15,000
TIO Stadium	Mars Stadium	Norwood Oval	TIO Traeger Park
Darwin, Northern Territory	Ballarat, Victoria	Adelaide, South Australia	Alice Springs, Northern Territory
Capacity: 12,215	Capacity: 11,000	Capacity: 9,700	Capacity: 7,200
Hands Oval	Barossa Park		
Bunbury, Western Australia	Lyndoch, South Australia		
Capacity: 14,350	Capacity: 10,000		
Australian Football League is located in Australia

== Players ==
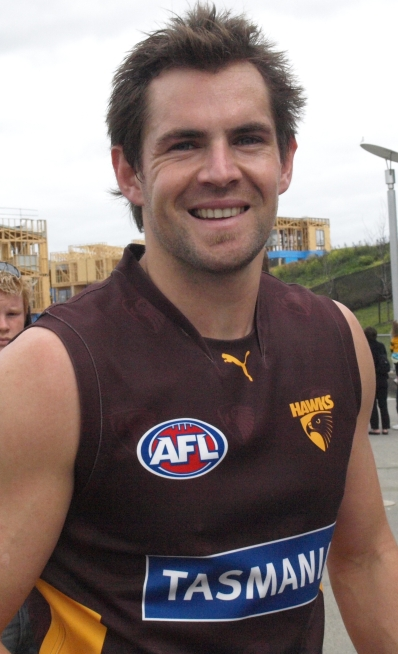
Luke Hodge, the first pick in the 2001 AFL draft. Hodge has played the most VFL/AFL games of any number-one draft pick (346 games played), is the only number-one draft pick to win a Norm Smith Medal, is one of just five number-one draft picks to have won a premiership, and has won the most premierships of any number-one draft pick (4)

AFL players are drawn from a number of sources; however, most players enter the league through the AFL draft, held at the end of each season. A small number of players have converted from other sports, or been recruited internationally. Prior to the nationalisation of the competition, a zoning system was in place. At the end of the season, the best 22 players and coach from across the competition are selected in the All-Australian team.

The AFL has tight controls over the player lists of each club. Currently, apart from the recently added expansion clubs who have some additional players, each team can have a senior list of 38 to 40 players plus 4 to 6 rookie players, to a total of 44 players (following a reduction by two of the number of rookies in 2012) and up to three development rookies (international, alternative talent or New South Wales scholarship players). Changes to playing lists are permitted only in the off-season: clubs can trade players during a trade period which follows each season and recruit new players through the three AFL drafts, the national draft, the pre-season draft and the rookie draft, which take place after the trade period. A mid-year draft was conducted between 1990 and 1993. The national draft is the primary method of recruiting new players and has been used since 1986. The draft order is based on reverse-finishing position from the previous year but selections can be traded. Free agency player movements have only been permitted since the 2012/13 offseason, previously having been rejected by the AFL.

=== Salary cap ===
A salary cap (known as the Total Player Payments or TPP) is also in place as part of the league's equalisation policy; this was $9,130,000 for the 2013 season with a salary floor of $8,673,500 except for the Gold Coast, whose salary cap was $9,630,000 with a salary floor of $9,171,500 and Greater Western Sydney, whose salary cap was $9,987,000 with a floor of $9,530,500. As part of the AFL's enhanced equalisation policies, in 2014 the league announced an increase of the TPP for the 2015 and 2016 seasons. TPP increased an additional $150,000 per club in 2015 above previously contracted amounts, increasing from $9.92m to $10.07m in 2015 and $10.22m to $10.37m in 2016.

The salary cap was set at $1.25 million for 1987–1989 as per VFL agreement, with the salary floor set at 90% of the cap or $1.125 million; the salary floor was increased to 92.5% of the cap in 2001 and 95% of the cap for 2013 due to increased revenues. Both the salary cap and salary floor has increased substantially since the competition was rebranded as the AFL in 1990.

Salaries of draft selections are fixed for two years. Salaries for senior players are not normally released to the public, though the average AFL player salary at the conclusion of the 2012 season was $251,559 and the top few players can expect to earn up to and above $1,000,000 a year. Upon successfully trading to the Sydney Swans in 2013, marquee player Lance Franklin signed a 9-year contract with the club, reportedly worth over $10 million and resulting in subsequent payments of $1.8 million annually in consecutive seasons. The Total Player Earnings (TPE) – or total amount of revenue spent on reimbursement of AFL listed players – at the conclusion of the 2012 season was $173.7 million, up by 13 per cent from $153.7 million in 2011.

In June 2017, the AFL and AFL Players Association agreed to a new CBA deal which resulted in a 20% increase in players' salaries. The six-year deal, which began in 2017 and ends in 2022 means that the average player wage rises from $309,000 to $371,000 and the player salary cap from $10.37m to $12.45m. In 2022, the final year of the agreement, the average player wage will be $389,000 with a salary cap of $13.54m.

The breaches of the salary cap and salary floor regulations outlined by the AFL are: exceeding the TPP; falling below the salary floor; not informing the AFL of payments; late or incorrect lodgement or loss of documents; or engaging in draft tampering. Penalties include fines of up to triple the amount involved ($10,000 for each document late or incorrect lodged or lost), forfeiture of draft picks and/or deduction of premiership points. The most significant breach of the salary cap was that of the Carlton Football Club in the early 2000s.

=== Demographics ===
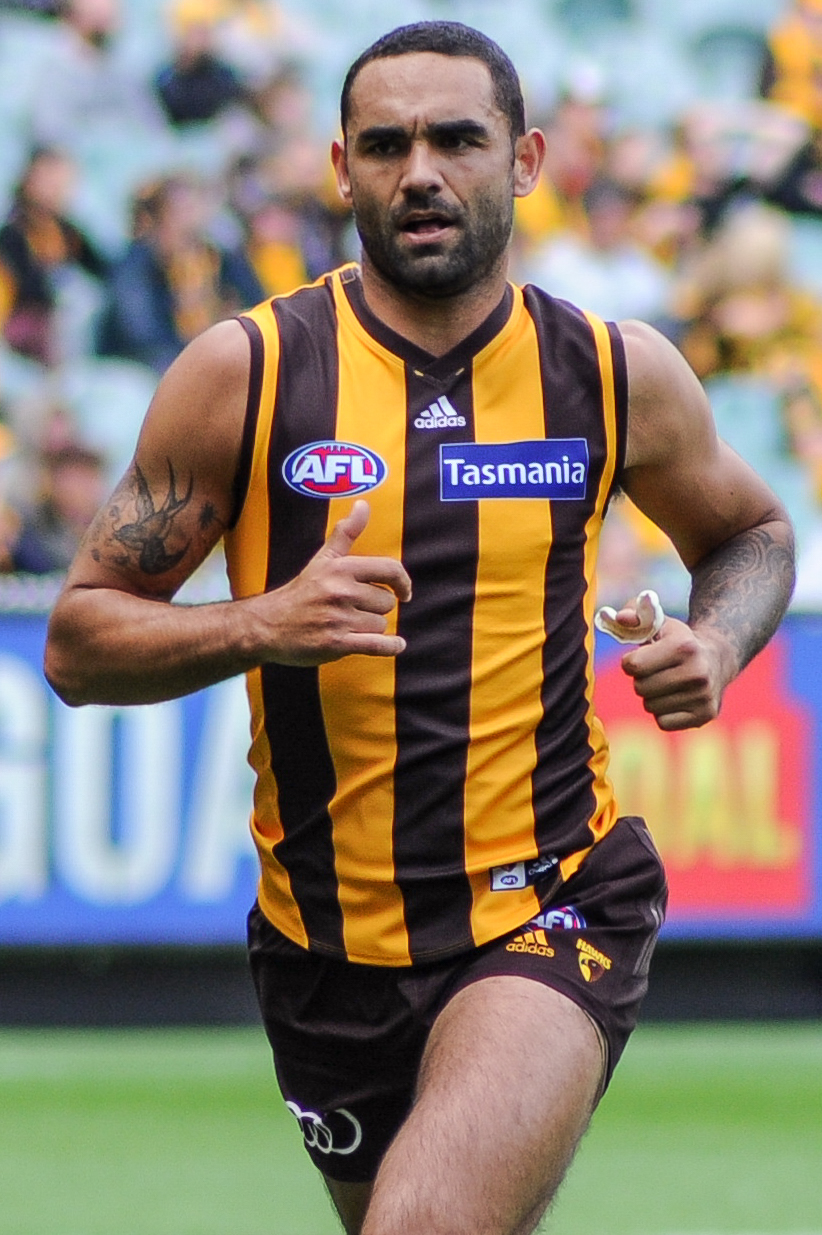
Shaun Burgoyne, the record holder for the most VFL/AFL matches played by an Indigenous Australian (407). Although comprising only 2.7% of the broader Australian population, Indigenous Australians make up 9% of AFL players.

There were 801 players on AFL club senior, veteran, rookie and international lists in 2011, including players from every state and mainland territory of Australia. As of 2014, there were 68 Indigenous Australian players on AFL club lists, comprising approximately 9% of the overall playing population.

There were 12 players recruited from outside Australia on AFL lists in 2011, including 10 from Ireland, all converts from Gaelic football drafted as part of the Irish Experiment and one each from the United States and Canada. There were also another five overseas-born players who emigrated to Australia at an early age on AFL lists.

An international rookie list and international scholarship list were introduced in 2006. The international rookie list includes up to two players between the ages of 15 and 23 who are not Australian citizens. These players may remain on this list for up to three years before they must be transferred to the senior or rookie list. For the first year, payments made to international-rookie-listed players fell outside the salary cap. The international scholarship list gives AFL clubs the option of recruiting up to eight players from outside Australia (other than Ireland). Irish players are required to either be placed on clubs' senior or rookie lists. At the beginning of 2011, there were 14 international scholarship players.

Of the 121 multicultural players, more than half have one parent from Anglophone countries, mainly the United Kingdom, Ireland and New Zealand.

== Season structure ==
=== Pre-season ===
From 1988 until 2013, the AFL ran a pre-season competition that finished prior to the commencement of the premiership season, which served as both warm-up matches for the season and as a stand-alone competition.

It was mostly contested as a four-week knock out tournament but the format changed after the expansion of the league beyond sixteen clubs in 2011 and has frequently been used to trial rule changes.

In 2014, the competition format was abandoned and practice matches are now played under the sponsored name Marsh Community Series. This consists of all 18 clubs playing two matches each, which are played on some weekdays and weekends, throughout February and early March.

=== Premiership season ===
The AFL home-and-away season at present lasts for 25 rounds, starting in early March and ending in late August. As of the 2026 AFL season, each team plays 23 matches, consisting of 11 home games, 11 away games, 1 neutral game, and two byes. Teams receive four premiership points for a win and two premiership points for a draw. Ladder finishing positions are based on the number of premiership points won. "Percentage", calculated as the ratio of points scored to points conceded throughout the season, is used as a tie-breaker when teams finish with equal premiership points. Further tie-breakers, if required, are the premiership points accumulated in head-to-head matches between the tied teams and then the percentage earned in such matches, with a final tie-breaker being a random drawing of lots.

==== Themed rounds and special matches ====
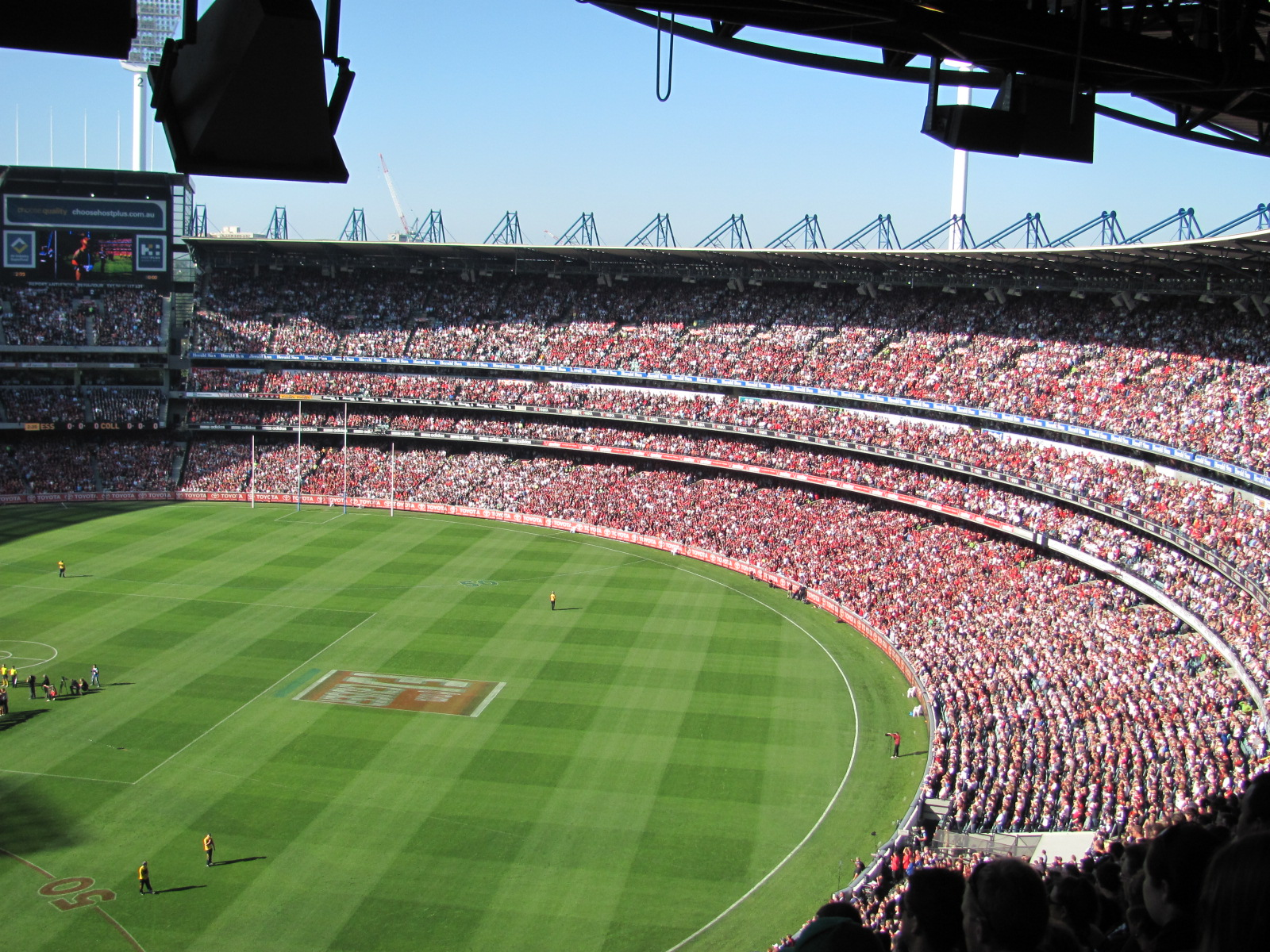
The Anzac Day clash, one of the marquee fixtures in the AFL home and away season

Several teams also play against each other at set times each year, with the most prominent of these being when Collingwood play Essendon in the annual Anzac Day clash at the MCG. Other prominent matches include the King's Birthday match between Collingwood and Melbourne and the Easter Monday clash between Geelong and Hawthorn.

As of November 2023 the men's league had no plans to introduce a Pride Round in the men's game, although the AFLW had established their pride round in 2021.

There are separate trophies for matches between several clubs.

==== Sir Doug Nicholls Round — "Indigenous Round" ====
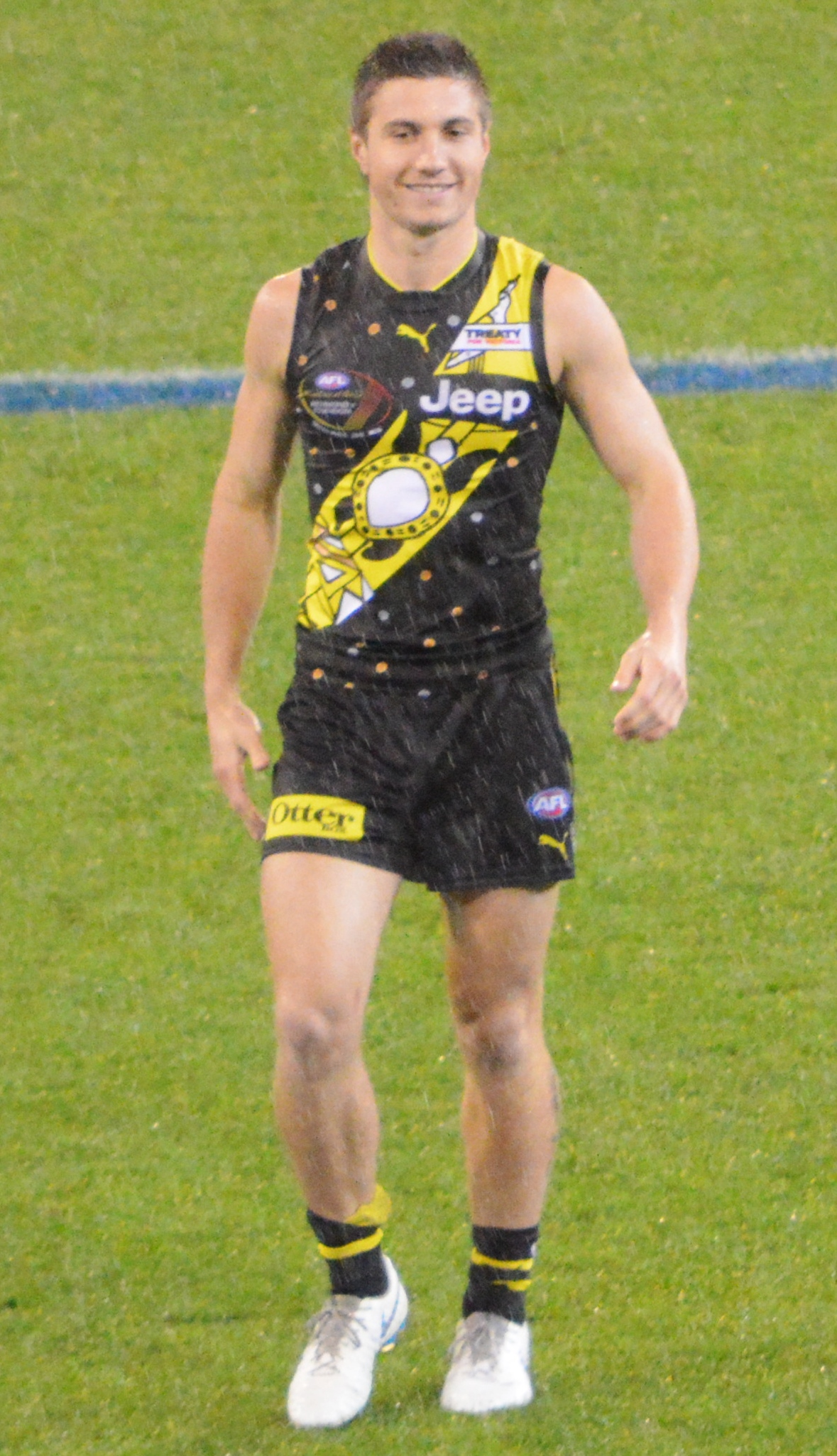
Liam Baker at a Dreamtime at the 'G match in 2019. During the Sir Doug Nicholls Round, players wear guernseys featuring specially commissioned artwork by an Indigenous artist

Perhaps the most well-known of the themed rounds is the Indigenous Round. In 2007, following the success of the Dreamtime at the 'G matches in 2005 and 2006, the AFL nominated a specific Indigenous Round (round 9), which has become an annual event in which the Dreamtime at the 'G match takes centre stage on a Saturday night. The success of the annual match, which now usually features crowds in excess of 80,000, led to the two clubs agreeing to cement the match arrangement for an additional decade in May 2016.

In 2016, the round was named after Sir Doug Nicholls, the only VFL player to have been knighted and who served as a state governor (of South Australia). The round is now officially named the Sir Doug Nicholls Round. Each year, each player in all 18 clubs wears a specially commissioned artwork by an Indigenous artist on their guernsey, and some clubs rebrand with Indigenous club names in place of their regular names for the duration.

=== Finals series ===
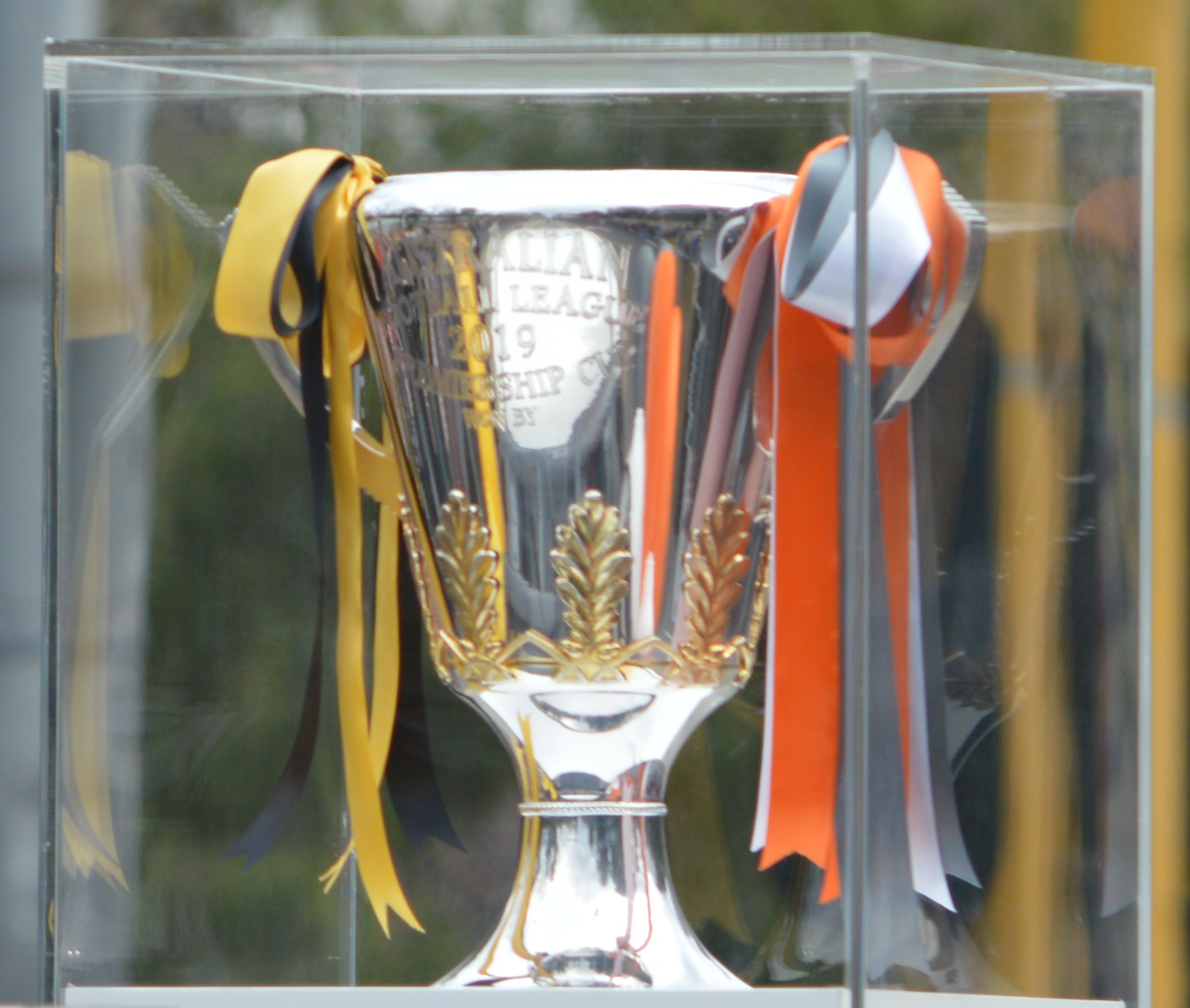
The AFL Premiership Cup on display at the 2019 AFL Grand Final parade

As introduced in the 2026 AFL Season, only the top 6 are locked into finals whilst places 7-10 are to play in a 'Wildcard Round' as outlined in the new AFL final ten system. Places 7 and 10, 8 and 9 play to finalise the top 8 teams who will progress into week 2 of the finals. The finals series is played throughout September, culminating in a grand final to determine the premiers. The grand final is traditionally played at the Melbourne Cricket Ground on the afternoon of the last Saturday in September.

The winning team receives a silver premiership cup, a navy blue premiership flag – a new one of each is manufactured each year – and is recorded on the perpetual E. L. Wilson Shield. The flag has been presented since the league began and is traditionally unfurled at the team's first home game of the following season. The Wilson Shield, named after Edwin Lionel Wilson, was first awarded after the 1929 premiership. The premiership cup was first introduced in 1959 and is manufactured annually by Cash's International at their metalworks in Frankston, Victoria. Additionally, each player in the grand final–winning team receives a premiership medallion.

== Awards ==
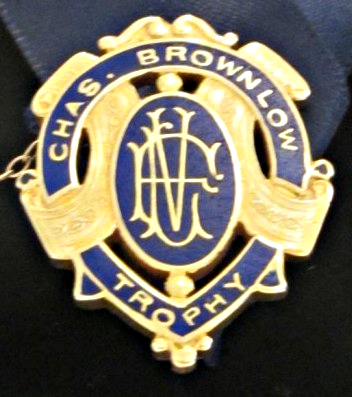
The Brownlow Medal is awarded the played deemed to the fairest and best player in the league

- Brownlow Medal – to the fairest and best player in the league, voted by the umpires
- Coleman Medal – to the player who kicks the most goals during the home-and-away season
- All-Australian team – a squad of 22 players deemed the best in their positions, voted by an AFL-appointed committee
- Rising Star Award – to the fairest and best young player (under the age of 21 and with fewer than ten games' experience at the beginning of the year), voted by the All-Australian committee
- Norm Smith Medal – the best player on the ground in the grand final, voted by a committee
- Jock McHale Medal – the coach of the premiership-winning team
- Mark of the Year – to the player who takes the best or most spectacular mark during the season
- Goal of the Year – to the player who kicks the best or most spectacular goal during the season
- Leigh Matthews Trophy – to the best player in the league, voted by the players through the AFL Players' Association
- Ron Barassi Medal - to the winning captain in the Grand Final. Introduced in 2024 in honour of the late Ron Barassi, who died in September 2023, aged 87. Ron Barassi was an inaugural member and earnt the Legend status within the AFL Hall of Fame when it was founded in 1996. Barassi won 10 premierships, 6 as a player for Melbourne Demons (1955, 1956, 1957, 1959, 1960, and 1964) and 4 as a coach (2 with the Carlton Blues in 1968 & 1970, and the other 2 with the North Melbourne Kangaroos in 1975 & 1977). AFL Chief Executive Andrew Dillon said, "it was only fitting the Ron Barassi Medal was now etched into our game's history".

Other independent best and fairest awards are presented by different football and media organisations.

=== Team of the Century ===
To celebrate the 100th season of the VFL/AFL, the "AFL Team of the Century" was named in 1996.

VFL/AFL Team of the Century
B:	Bernie Smith (Geelong, West Adelaide)	Stephen Silvagni (Carlton)	John Nicholls (Carlton)
HB:	Bruce Doull (Carlton)	Ted Whitten (Footscray) Captain	Kevin Murray (Fitzroy, East Perth)
C:	Francis Bourke (Richmond)	Ian Stewart (Hobart, St Kilda, Richmond)	Keith Greig (North Melbourne)
HF:	Alex Jesaulenko (Carlton, St Kilda)	Royce Hart (Richmond)	Dick Reynolds (Essendon)
F:	Leigh Matthews (Hawthorn)	John Coleman (Essendon)	Haydn Bunton Sr. (Fitzroy, Subiaco, Port Adelaide)
Foll:	Graham 'Polly' Farmer (Geelong, East Perth, West Perth)	Ron Barassi (Melbourne, Carlton)	Bob Skilton (South Melbourne)
Int:	Gary Ablett Sr. (Hawthorn, Geelong)	Jack Dyer (Richmond)	Greg Williams (Geelong, Sydney, Carlton)
Coach:	Norm Smith (Melbourne, Fitzroy, South Melbourne)		

Jack Elder was declared the Umpire of the Century to coincide with the Team of the Century. Since the naming of this side, most AFL clubs have nominated their own teams of the century. An Indigenous Team of the Century was also selected in 2005, featuring the best Aboriginal players of the previous 100 years from both the VFL/AFL and other state leagues.

== Representative football ==
=== State football ===
State representation football in the AFL initially ended in 1999. The concept has been revived twice since then in 2008 and 2020 when a Victorian state team took on all stars teams (in 2008 against The Dream Team and in 2020 against the All Stars).

==== History of the VFL/AFL's involvement ====
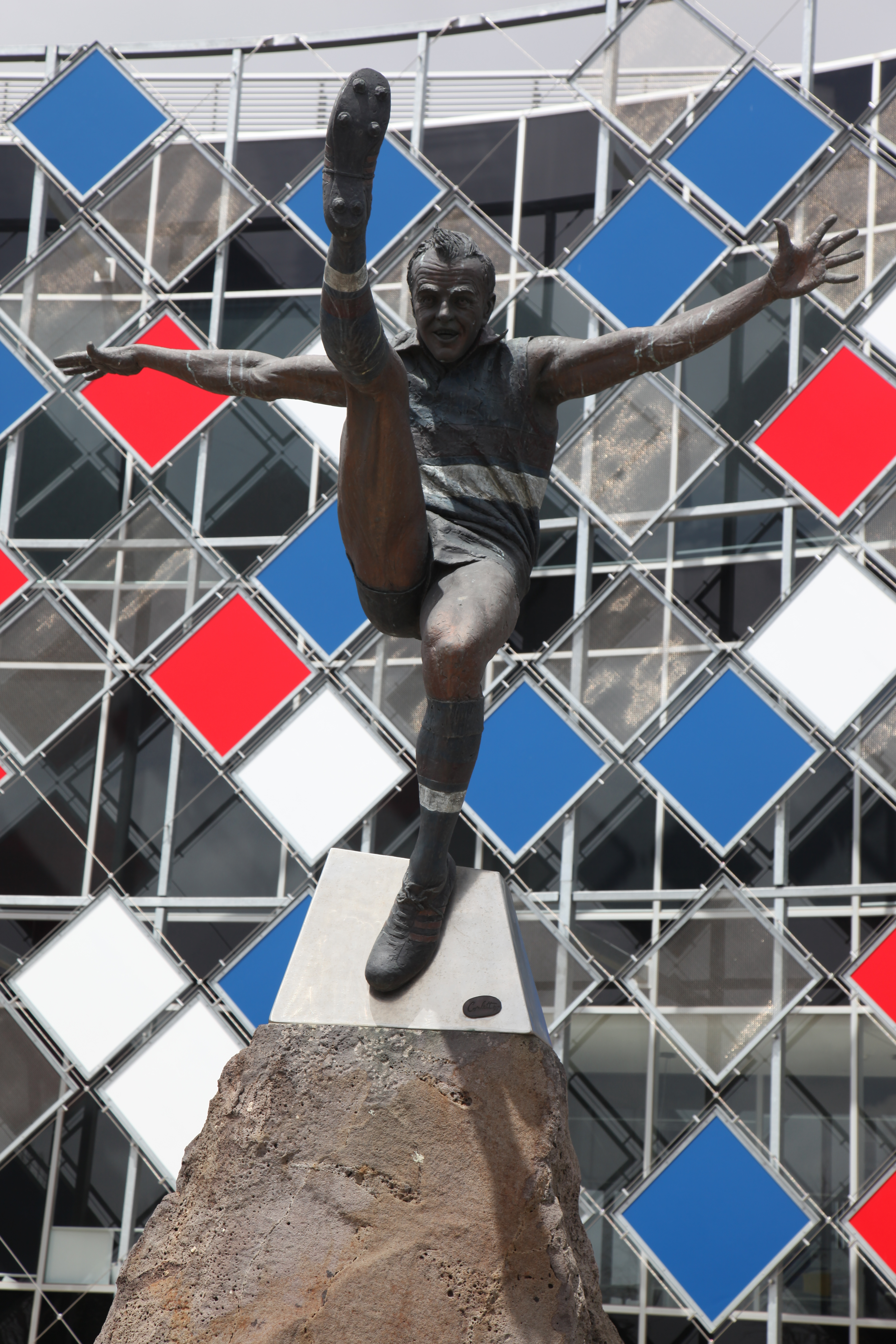
Statue of Footscray legend and leading State of Origin proponent Ted Whitten, after whom the E. J. Whitten Legends Game is named

VFL players first represented the Victoria representative team in 1897 regardless of their state of origin.

Being the dominant league drawing many of the country's best players, the Victoria Australian rules football team (nicknamed the "Big V" and composed mostly of VFL players) dominated interstate matches until the introduction of State of Origin selection criteria by the Australian Football Council in 1977, after which Victoria's results with the other main Australian football states became more even.

The AFL assumed control of interstate football in 1993 and coordinated an annual State of Origin series typically held during a mid-season bye round.

However, after the 1999 series, the AFL declared the concept of interstate football "on hold", citing club unwillingness to release star players and a lack of public interest. Indeed, the 1999 series, where Victoria defeated South Australia by 54 points, was played in wet conditions in front of a crowd of 26,063, whereas 10 years earlier, the same match-up with a plethora of star players attracted a crowd of 91,960.

The AFL shifted its focus of representative football to the International Rules Series, where at the time in the late 1990s, drew a greater television revenue. A once-off representative match, known as the AFL Hall of Fame Tribute Match, was played in 2008 to celebrate the 150th anniversary of the sport between a team of players of Victorian origin and a team of players of interstate origin (the "Dream Team"), which was won by Victoria.

In 2020, the AFL hosted a special one-off State of Origin match, with the money raised from the event going towards affected bushfire communities. On 28 February, the game took place at Marvel Stadium, with Victoria defeating an All-Stars team and Dustin Martin being declared best on ground.

Since 1996, some past AFL players participated and helped with the promotion of the E. J. Whitten Legends Game, although this, too, was put on indefinite hiatus following the 2019 edition.

== Global market ==
Although no professional leagues or teams exist outside Australia, the AFL has stated that it wishes to showcase Australian rules football to other countries such as the United States of America to create a global following, thus creating more exposure for its sponsors in the increasing North America markets. On 17 October 2010, AFL clubs Melbourne Demons and Brisbane Lions played an exhibition game in front of 7,000 people at the Jiangwan Sports Center in Shanghai. This was the first professional AFL game to be played in China. Since then, AFL premiership matches have been played in New Zealand and China, and the competition developed some interest in North America amidst the COVID-19 pandemic.

=== International Rules Series ===
The AFL has garnered increased interest in Ireland due to the introduction of the International Rules Series played between an AFL-picked Australian Team (sourced entirely from All-Australian players since 2004) and Ireland international rules football team beginning from 1984. The series is organised under the auspices of the AFL and the Gaelic Athletic Association. The game itself is a hybrid sport, consisting of rules from both Australian football and Gaelic football. The series provides the only outlet for AFL players to represent their nation. This series encouraged young Irish footballers switching code to join AFL teams because, whilst the Gaelic Football is strictly amateur, the AFL is fully professional, thus players can make a living out of playing AFL. However, some Irish players fail to make the grade into the very competitive AFL. This also paved the way for extended news coverage and increased broadcasting in the United Kingdom and Ireland.

Around the same time that the inaugural International Rules Series commenced, Australian Football Hall of Fame Legend Ron Barassi launched the Irish experiment, which scouted and recruited dozens of Irishmen (usually Gaelic footballers) with potential for crossing over to playing in the AFL. This resulted in successful recruitmant and training of Australian Hall of Famer Jim Stynes among other successful players.

== Corporate governance ==
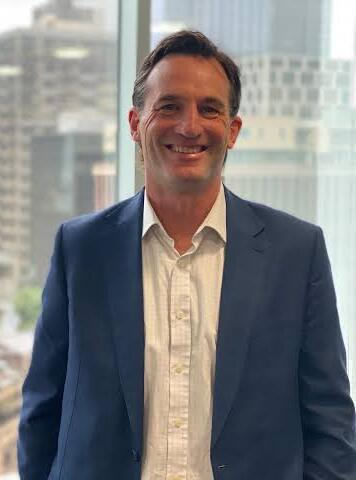
Andrew Dillon, the incumbent CEO of the AFL

The AFL is governed by directors known as the AFL Commission. The commission was established in December 1985 and replaced the board of directors elected by and representing the original member clubs in 1993, after the club parochialism and self-interest which came with the traditional club delegate based administrative structure threatened to undermine the competition.

The commission chairman is Craig Drummond, who took over from Richard Goyder on 4 March 2026. The CEO of the AFL is Andrew Dillon.

In addition to administering the national competition, the AFL is heavily involved in promoting and developing the sport in Australia. It provides funds for local leagues and in conjunction with local clubs, administers the Auskick program for young boys and girls.

The AFL also plays a leading role in developing the game outside Australia, with projects to develop the game at junior level in other countries (e.g. South Africa) and by supporting affiliated competitions around the world (See Australian football around the world).

The players of the AFL are represented by the AFL Players Association, the coaches are represented by the AFL Coaches Association, the umpires are represented by the AFL Umpires Association and the related media employees are represented by the Australian Football Media Association.

== Audience ==
The AFL was the best-attended sporting league in Australia in 2012. According to market research, the AFL is the second-most-watched sporting event in Australia, behind cricket. Currently, broadcast rights for the AFL are shared between the Seven Network (free-to-air), Foxtel (pay TV) and Kayo Sports (internet). In 2019, a record 1,057,572 people were members of an AFL club. TV audiences during the 2022 AFL season totalled 125.4 million viewers, with an average of 537,000 people watching each match; the TV audience for the 2023 AFL Grand Final was 4.98 million—plus an additional 756,000 on 7plus, for a total of 5.736 million—and the game was seen by 100,024 stadium spectators, which was exactly the same as the 2022 AFL Grand Final. Excluding the grand final (which is exclusive to Seven Network in Australia), 54% of viewers watched using the paid services of Foxtel or Kayo in 2022, while 46% watched the Seven Network's free-to-air broadcasts.

=== Attendance ===
The following are the most recent season attendances:

Year	Total	Average	Finals total^{1}	Finals average^{1}	Grand final
2025	7,656,090^{2}	36,986^{2}	600,937	66,771	100,022
2024	7,753,251^{2}	37,455^{2}	533,520	59,280	100,013
2023	7,474,684	36,110	664,780	73,864	100,024^{2}
2022	6,112,431	30,871	639,980	71,109	100,024^{2}
2021^{6}	3,976,228	19,209	272,746	30,305	61,118
2020^{6}	826,458	6,665	206,579	22,953	29,707^{7}
2019	6,954,187	35,122	563,460	62,607	100,014
2018	6,894,772	34,822	700,393^{2}	77,821^{2}	100,022
2017	6,734,062	34,010	553,818	61,535	100,021
2016	6,311,656	31,877	558,343	62,038	99,981
2015	6,367,302	32,321	518,694	57,663	98,633
2014	6,403,941	32,343	570,568	63,396	99,454
2013	6,372,784	32,186	558,391	62,043	100,007
2012	6,238,876	31,509	538,934	59,882	99,683
2011	6,533,138	34,937	614,250	68,250	99,537
2010	6,494,564	36,901	651,764	65,176	100,016^{4} and 93,853^{5}
2009	6,375,622	36,225	615,463	68,385	99,251
2008	6,512,999	37,006^{2}	571,760	63,258	100,012
2007	6,475,521	36,793	575,424	63,936	97,302
2006	6,204,056	35,250	532,178	59,131	97,431
2005	6,283,788	35,703	480,112	53,346	91,898^{3}
2004	5,909,836	33,579	458,326	50,925	77,671^{3}
2003	5,876,515	33,389	478,425	53,158	79,451^{3}
2002	5,648,021	32,091	449,445	49,938	91,817
2001	5,919,026	33,631	525,993	58,444	91,482
2000	5,731,091	32,563	566,562	62,951	96,249
1999	5,768,611	32,776	472,007	52,445	94,228
1998	6,119,861	34,772	572,733	63,637	94,431
1997	5,853,449	33,258	560,406	62,267	99,645
1996	5,222,266	29,672	478,773	53,197	93,102
1995	5,119,694	29,089	594,919	66,102	93,678
1994	4,723,023	28,624	514,375	57,153	93,860
1993	4,185,388	27,903	472,101	67,443	96,862
1992	4,332,917	26,260	481,348	68,764	95,007
1991	3,797,177	23,013	381,707	54,530	75,230^{8}
1990	3,587,495	23,295	475,790	67,970	98,944

^{1} Finals total and Finals average include grand final crowds.
^{2} Record.
^{3} Capacity reduced due to MCG refurbishment.
^{4} Crowd for the drawn grand final.
^{5} Crowd for the grand final replay, played one week after the drawn grand final.
^{6} Attendance reduced due to the COVID-19 pandemic.
^{7} Capacity reduced due to the COVID-19 pandemic.
^{8} Waverley Park was used for the Grand Final due to the Great Southern Stand at the MCG being under construction.

Key
	Record high
	Record low
*	Affected by the COVID-19 pandemic

=== Television ===
==== Australian television ====
AFL matches are currently broadcast in Australia by the free-to-air Seven Network and subscription television provider Foxtel. The current deal was announced in September 2022 and covered the inclusive 2025–2031 seasons.

The Seven Network broadcasts an average of three-and-a-half games a round; Friday Night, Saturday Night, Sunday Afternoon and any Thursday or Monday Night matches that may occur throughout the year. Channel Seven also airs the AFL Finals Series and the AFL Grand Final. Foxtel broadcasts every match through their Fox Footy channels, including simulcasts from the Seven Network except for the grand final, which is aired exclusively on Channel Seven. Foxtel also has the rights to air rounds on their internet protocol television platform titled Foxtel Now, as well as via the sports streaming service Kayo.

==== Telecast history ====
The 1957 VFL season was the first broadcast after the commencement of television in Australia (introduced in 1956 to coincide with the Melbourne Olympic Games). During the late 1950s and 1960s, all Melbourne stations (ABV2, HSV7, GTV9 and, after it commenced in 1965, ATV0/ATV10) broadcast some games. However, in the late 1950s and early 1960s, the VFL was concerned that direct telecasts may affect attendances and stations were only permitted to telecast a delayed replay of the last quarter of games. From 1974 until 1986, the Seven Network and the Australian Broadcasting Corporation (ABC) were given exclusive rights to VFL/AFL games. The only year Seven did not telecast games was 1987 when the rights were bought by Broadcom, which on-sold the rights to the ABC in Victoria. Seven regained the rights in 1988 and also exclusive rights.

With the launch of subscription television in Australia, AFL match coverage commenced on cable television. Optus Vision bid for and won exclusive pay-TV rights from 1996 to 2001, screening coverage on its own 24-hour AFL channel, branded Sports AFL in Brisbane, Sydney and Melbourne (where available). The Sports AFL channel was later closed due to financial issues and relaunched in March 1999 as C7 Sport by the Seven Network with AFL match coverage also transferred to the new channel. C7 Sport became available in regional areas not in the Foxtel or Optus Vision licence area via Austar soon after the re-launch. The AFL coverage was not available through Foxtel at this time as the Seven Network and Foxtel disagreed on the cost of carrying the C7 channel. These issues regarding C7 and AFL broadcasting rights evolved into a court case between not just the Seven Network and News Limited but Seven against the owners of the Nine Network and Network Ten in the years that followed.

On 25 January 2001, the Seven Network's main rivals, the Kerry Packer led Nine Network, Network Ten and pay-TV's Foxtel set up a consortium which bid $500 million for the right to broadcast the 2002–2006 seasons inclusive. Seven had purchased a guaranteed right to make the last bid in 1995, but decided not to outbid their rivals. The games were split between the networks, with Nine screening Friday Night Football, a live Sunday afternoon game in the east and, if needed, a doubleheader for WA and SA, Ten screened a Saturday afternoon and a Saturday night match, with the remaining three matches shown on Foxtel. Foxtel set up its own version of a dedicated AFL-only channel, the Fox Footy Channel, which showed every game on replay during the week, as well as many news, talkback and general interest shows related to Australian rules football.

When the rights were offered again in January 2006 for the 2007 to 2011 seasons, Seven formed an alliance with Ten and used its guaranteed last bid rights to match Nine's offer of $780 million to win back the broadcast rights in what was the biggest sport telecasting deal in Australian history at the time. After lengthy negotiations, Foxtel agreed to be a broadcast partner and showed four live matches each week, although no longer on a dedicated AFL channel. Seven took back the Friday night match and only one game on Sunday, while Ten retained showing two matches on Saturdays. Foxtel showed two games on Saturday and two on Sunday, including a late afternoon or twilight game.

The 2012–2016 rights were bought by Seven, Foxtel and Telstra for $1.25 billion, the biggest sport telecasting deal in Australian history at the time. As part of the deal, Foxtel would show all home-and-away AFL matches live, as well as all Finals bar the grand final, via the resurrected Fox Footy. Telstra would broadcast all matches via mobile and Seven would broadcast three live matches (Friday night, Saturday night and Sunday afternoon) and one delayed match (Saturday afternoon). Seven also had the option to on-sell one game a week to either Nine or Ten; this did not happen.

The 2017–2022 rights were re-bought by Seven, Foxtel and Telstra for $2.5 billion, besting the previous deal to become the most lucrative in Australian history at the time. Under the terms of the deal, Seven broadcasts at least three live matches per round as well as all Finals matches, whilst Foxtel broadcasts (or simulcasts Seven's feed) all nine matches per round, as well as all Finals bar the grand final, which is exclusively broadcast by Seven. Telstra continues to maintain exclusive mobile broadcast rights to all matches. There are some variations in broadcasting dependent on the relevant state or territory. The agreement with Seven, Foxtel and Telstra was extended in 2020 by two years to include the 2023 and 2024 seasons.

In 2021 Telstra's AFL streaming service, AFL Live Pass, was removed and replaced with access to Kayo, run by Hubbl (then called Streamotion), a wholly owned subsidiary of Foxtel.

The 2025–2031 rights were re-bought by Seven, Foxtel and Telstra for $4.5 billion, once again besting the previous deal to become the most lucrative in Australian history. As part of the deal, Seven would show three-and-a-half games a week on average during the home-and-away season, as well as all Finals and the Brownlow Medal. This includes Thursday Night games for the first 15 rounds of each season and streaming rights to all matches they broadcast via 7+. Fox Footy would continue to show every home-and-away game and every final live bar the Grand Final via Foxtel and Kayo, as well as select matches on Binge. All Foxtel matches will have Fox Footy commentary, including simulcasts of Channel Seven matches, and Saturday matches will be exclusive to Fox Footy for the first fifteen rounds bar any marquee matches. These arrangements differ outside of Victoria, where every local team's match will be broadcast on free-to-air, albeit with Saturday matches on delay for the first eight rounds. Prior to the start of the 2025 season, the deal was altered such that Fox Footy's Saturday exclusivity in Victoria was extended to the entire home and away season. In exchange, the AFL would schedule Thursday Night Football for almost the entire season, allowing Seven to broadcast the same number of games.

=== International broadcasts ===
==== International broadcast history ====
Historically AFL broadcasts in other countries have varied.

In late 1979, the brand new ESPN cable network signed the league's first international TV contract. Coverage began with the 1980 season with matches airing on late Friday and Saturday nights, sometimes live but usually one or two week tape delayed to up to 2.5 million subscribers. At the time, reports indicated ESPN paid the VFL nearly $100,000 (the VFL's Australian TV rights deal at the time was just $600,000). The 1983 VFL Grand Final was the first time in history that the Grand Final was broadcast live into the US. Coverage continued on ESPN until 1986, when the sport was dropped after which it was not broadcast in the US for over a decade.

New Zealand was the second country which held broadcast rights in 1980, with highlight packages with the Grand Final going live into the country.

In the early 1990s, American regional sports network Prime Sports (unrelated to the Australian regional television network) aired Seven's weekly highlight show as well as the grand final. Some other English speaking countries have shown the game, however, it has been since 2008 that channels in other countries began televising matches. From 1998 to 2006 games were broadcast in the United States by the Fox Sports World network.

In 2007, after the record domestic television rights deal, the AFL secured an additional bonus: greater international television rights and increase exposure to overseas markets, including a five-year deal with Setanta Sports and new deals with other overseas pay-TV networks. The deal ended early in 2009 when Setanta stopped broadcasting into Great Britain. ESPN again took up the contract.

Additionally, AFL games can be shown in Irish pubs and sport pubs by request in Bangkok. Thai's broadcasting rights is under ABC Asia.

==== International broadcast partners ====
The following countries are ranked by the approximate extent of their current television coverage (and whether it is free to air):

Station/Channel	Countries	Free/Subscription	Home & Away	Finals	Grand final	Broadcasting since	Notes
ESPN Africa	Africa	Subscription	Three games per week (live/delay)	Live			See also Australian rules football in Africa
ABC Australia	East Asia; Central Asia; South Asia; Southeast Asia; Pacific Islands	Free (may require subscription by selected operators)	Six games per week	Yes	Live		
TSN2	Canada	Subscription	Two games per week (live/replay)		Live		See also Australian rules football in Canada, AFANA
TSN5	Canada	Subscription	One game per week (live/replay)		Live		See also Australian rules football in Canada, AFANA
Star Sports (China)	China	Subscription	Three games per week	Live	Live		See also Australian rules football in China
Premier Sports Asia	China	Subscription	Two games per week	Live	Live		See also Australian rules football in China
SportDigital1+	Germany; Austria; Switzerland	Subscription	Two games per week	Live	Live		See also Australian rules football in Germany
Sky Sport 3	New Zealand	Subscription	One game per week	Live	Live		See also Australian rules football in New Zealand
Sky Sport 7	New Zealand	Subscription	Five games per week	Live	Live		See also Australian rules football in New Zealand
TNT Sports	United Kingdom; Ireland	Subscription	Nine games per week	Live	Live		See also Australian rules football in the United Kingdom
Fox Sports 1 and Fox Sports 2	United States	Subscription	Three games per week, some finals	Yes	Yes	2013	See also Australian rules football in the United States, AFANA
Fox Soccer Plus	United States	Subscription	Six games per week	Yes	Yes		See also Australian rules football in the United States, AFANA

=== Radio ===
The first broadcast of a VFL game was by 3AR in 1923, the year that licensed broadcasting commenced in Australia. The first commentator was Wallace (Jumbo) Shallard, a former Geelong player who went on to have a long and respected career in print and broadcast media. The VFL/AFL has been broadcast every year since then by the ABC and (since 1927) by various commercial stations. The saturation period was the early 1960s when seven of the eight extant radio stations (3AR, 3UZ, 3DB, 3KZ, 3AW, 3XY and 3AK) broadcast VFL games each week, as well as broadcasts of Geelong games by local station 3GL. (At this time, the only alternative that radio listeners had to listen to the football on a Saturday afternoon were the classical music and fine arts programs that were broadcast by 3LO).

The AFL's contracted radio broadcast partners are:

- National:
- ABC Sport (broadcasts matches across Australia to selected major cities in ACT/NSW/QLD/SA/TAS/WA)
- Triple M Adelaide *
- Triple M Brisbane *
- Triple M Hobart
- Triple M Melbourne
- Triple M Perth *
- Triple M Sydney *
- Community & Local:
- SEN SA Radio Adelaide
- FIVEAA Radio Adelaide
- 98.9FM Radio Brisbane
- K-Rock Radio Geelong *
- 3AW Radio Melbourne
- 1116 SEN Radio Melbourne
- 6PR Radio Perth
- Triple M Adelaide (broadcasts only Adelaide and Port Adelaide matches, including the Showdown)
- Triple M Brisbane (broadcasts only Brisbane and Gold Coast matches, including the QClash)
- K-Rock Geelong (includes broadcasts of Geelong matches)
- Triple M Perth (broadcasts only Fremantle and West Coast matches, including the Western Derby)
- Triple M Sydney *(broadcasts only Greater Western Sydney and Sydney matches, including the Battle of Sydney)

==== Non-English radio ====
The vast majority of radio broadcasting is done in English. However, ethnic radio stations broadcast the AFL in a variety of languages, including Arabic, Chinese, Greek, Hindi and Spanish. Many also broadcast in Indigenous languages, as the sport is very popular among Indigenous Australians.

Station	Language	State/territory	Reference(s)
Central Australian Aboriginal Media Association (CAAMA)	Arrernte	Northern Territory	
Top End Aboriginal Bush Broadcasting Association (TEABBA)	Tiwi	Northern Territory	
Yolŋu Radio	Yolŋu	Northern Territory	

=== Internet ===
The AFL's contracted internet/mobile broadcast partner is Telstra. The AFL also provides exclusive broadband content, including streaming video for international fans, via its website. Telstra also hosts the websites of all the 18 AFL clubs.

However, the website is frequently derided by users for its convoluted information architecture and bloated presentation.

Since 2012, Telstra has broadcast live matches over its Next G mobile network for a pay-per-view or season fee.

Since 2019, Kayo has broadcast every game, except the Grand Final, live. In Feb 2021, Telstra terminated the AFL Live Pass service, replacing it with access to Kayo at a discount for Telstra customers.

Streaming rights outside of Australia for full games are currently held by the Watch AFL subscription service operated by Fox Sports Australia.

== Corporate relations ==
=== Sponsorship ===
The VFL/AFL's competition naming sponsors have been:

- Carlton & United Breweries (1980–81, 86, 89–94, 2001–03)
- Holden (1982–83)
- Nissan (1984–85)
- Sportsplay (1987)
- Elders IXL (1988)
- Coca-Cola (1995–2000)
- Toyota (2004–present)

The AFL's contracted print media partner is News Corp Australia. The AFL Record is a match-day magazine published by the AFL and is read by around 225,000 people each week.

=== Membership ===
The AFL sells memberships that entitle subscribers to reserve seats for matches at Docklands Stadium and the Melbourne Cricket Ground in Melbourne. AFL members also receive priority access to finals. Three levels of memberships are offered, bronze, silver and full (gold). Only full members have guaranteed access to preliminary and grand final matches. Bronze members are restricted to fewer matches at the MCG only.

==== Video games ====
The following is a list of all the video games from the AFL video game series:

- Australian Rules Football (1989) Commodore 64, ZX Spectrum, Amstrad CPC
- Aussie Rules Footy (1991) NES
- AFL Finals Fever (1996) Microsoft Windows
- AFL 98 (1997) Microsoft Windows
- AFL 99 (1998) PlayStation, Microsoft Windows
- Kevin Sheedy's: AFL Coach 2002 (2001) Microsoft Windows
- AFL Live 2003 (2002) Microsoft Windows, PlayStation 2, Xbox
- AFL Live 2004 (2003) Microsoft Windows, PlayStation 2, Xbox
- AFL Live Premiership Edition (2004) Microsoft Windows, PlayStation 2, Xbox
- AFL Premiership 2005 (2005) Microsoft Windows, PlayStation 2, Xbox
- AFL Premiership 2006 (2006) PlayStation 2
- AFL Premiership 2007 (2007) PlayStation 2
- AFL Mascot Manor (2009) Nintendo DS
- AFL Challenge (2009) PlayStation Portable
- AFL Live (2011) PlayStation 3, Xbox 360
- AFL (2011) Wii, iOS
- AFL Live 2 (2013) PlayStation 3, Xbox 360, iOS, Android
- AFL Evolution (2017) Microsoft Windows, PlayStation 4, Xbox One
- AFL Evolution 2 (2020) Microsoft Windows, PlayStation 4, Xbox One
- AFL 23 (2023) Microsoft Windows, PlayStation 4, Xbox One, PlayStation 5, Xbox Series X/S
- AFL 26 (2025) Microsoft Windows, PlayStation 4, Xbox One, PlayStation 5, Xbox Series X/S

== Activism ==
=== LGBTIQ policy ===
The AFL has declared its support for LGBTIQ community, organising pride games in June 2017. In September 2017, in conjunction with the Australian Marriage Law Postal Survey, the AFL modified its logo sign at Docklands Stadium support of same-sex marriage (however, only for 24 hours). In August 2025, Mitch Brown came out publicly as bisexual, becoming the AFL's first openly LGBTQ past or present player. Before his coming out, the AFL was the only major professional men's sport league worldwide to have never had an openly LGBTQ past or present player. Brown revealed that the weight of hiding his sexuality had taken its toll on his AFL career, where homophobic insults and conversations were commonplace on and off the field. AFL CEO Gillon McLachlan had previously stated that "the pressure and the weight of being... the first AFL player who comes out and plays as an out, gay man" was too much of a burden for the known gay players in the league to come out. Former players and officials suggested that a cause for the previous lack of openly queer players was a culture of homophobia and silence within the AFL, with former captain and ally Bob Murphy recalling shamefully his offhanded use of homophobic slurs as a young player. Homophobic language remains a problem at games with legal recommendations from the Australian Sports Commission made in 2000 to address this still not implemented.

In 2015 the Sydney Swans played a pre-season game at Drummoyne Oval against Fremantle Dockers as a Pride Game. This became an annual event, which has grown from year to year in strength and support. The club has an official LGBTQIA+ supporter group, Rainbow Swans.

In September 2017 the AFL ruled that Hannah Mouncey, a transgender woman, was ineligible for selection in the 2018 AFLW draft. There has been some opposition to the AFL's decision.

It has been suggested that the men's game could do more to promote inclusivity, as has been done in the AFLW. The AFLW Pride Round has been officially held since 2021, although there were individual AFLW clubs who had played Pride games since 2018. The intention of the Pride Round is to celebrate gender diversity, promote inclusion for LGBTIQA+ players, and to help stamp out homophobia. All 18 clubs support the round. As of November 2023 the men's league had no plans to introduce a Pride Round in the men's game.

=== Voice to Parliament ===
The AFL supported the creation of an Indigenous Voice to Parliament, ahead of the 2023 Australian Indigenous Voice referendum.

== Lawsuits ==
In 2023, a group of former players began a class-action lawsuit against the league regarding the concussions that they suffered while playing. The case is similar to the cases including cases against the NFL and the NHL.

In 2023, former female umpire Libby Toovey took the league to the Fair Work Commission, claiming that she was dismissed after uncovering systemic abuse of female umpires by the league.

== See also ==
- Australian rules football attendance records
- History of Australian rules football in Victoria (1859–1900)
- Rivalries in the Australian Football League
- Sports attendances

Lists

- List of VFL/AFL premiers
- List of VFL/AFL minor premiers
- List of VFL/AFL pre-season and night series premiers
- List of Indigenous Australian VFL/AFL and AFL Women's players
- List of VFL/AFL players born outside Australia
- List of VFL/AFL players by ethnicity
- List of current Australian Football League coaches
- List of Australian Football League grounds
- List of sports venues in Australia
- List of VFL/AFL presidents
- List of VFL/AFL records
- List of individual match awards in the Australian Football League
