= Heatseeker (disambiguation) =

A heatseeker is a type of missile guided by infrared homing.

Heatseeker may also refer to:

- "Heatseeker" (song), a song by AC/DC
- "Heat Seeker" (song), a song by Dreamers (band) with Grandson
- Heatseeker (video game), a 2007 jet fighter game
- One of the Top Heatseekers, Billboard song and album charts for new and developing acts
