= AFL (video game series) =

- Genres: Sports (Australian rules football)
- Developers: Clockwize Software Developments (1989); Beam Software (1991); Blue Tongue Entertainment (1996); Creative Assembly (1997–1998); IR Gurus (2001–2007); Wicked Witch Software (2009–2021); Big Ant Studios (2011–2012, 2023-)
- Publishers: Again Again (1989); Alternative Software (1989); Mattel (1991); Cadability (1996); EA Sports (1997–1998); Acclaim Entertainment (2001–2004); THQ (2004–2005); Sony Interactive Entertainment (2005–2009); Tru Blu Entertainment (2009–2021); Nacon (2023-)
- Platforms: Amstrad CPC, Android, Commodore 64, iOS, Microsoft Windows, Nintendo Entertainment System, Nintendo DS, Nintendo Wii, Nintendo Switch, Nintendo Switch 2, PlayStation, PlayStation 2, PlayStation 3, PlayStation 4, PlayStation 5, PlayStation Portable, Xbox, Xbox 360, Xbox One, Xbox Series X/S, ZX Spectrum
- First release: Australian Rules Football; 1989
- Latest release: AFL 26; 8 May 2025

The AFL video game series is a series of Australian rules football video games licensed and based on the VFL/AFL.

== Games in the series ==
Release timeline
| 1989 | Australian Rules Football |
1990
| 1991 | Aussie Rules Footy |
1992
1993
1994
1995
| 1996 | AFL Finals Fever |
| 1997 | AFL 98 |
| 1998 | AFL 99 |
1999
2000
| 2001 | Kevin Sheedy's: AFL Coach 2002 |
| 2002 | AFL Live 2003 |
| 2003 | AFL Live 2004 |
| 2004 | AFL Live: Premiership Edition |
| 2005 | AFL Premiership 2005 |
| 2006 | AFL Premiership 2006 |
| 2007 | AFL Premiership 2007 |
2008
| 2009 | AFL Mascot Manor |
| 2009 | AFL Challenge |
2010
| 2011 | AFL Live |
| 2011 | AFL |
| 2012 | AFL Live: Game of the Year Edition |
| 2013 | AFL Live 2 |
| 2014 | AFL Live 2: Season Pack 2014 |
2015
2016
| 2017 | AFL Evolution |
| 2018 | AFL Evolution: Season Pack 2018 |
2019
| 2020 | AFL Evolution 2 |
| 2021 | AFL Evolution 2: Season Pack 2021 |
2022
| 2023 | AFL 23 |
2024
| 2025 | AFL 26 |

=== Australian Rules Football ===
- Developer: Clockwize Software Developments
- Publisher: Again Again, Alternative Software
- Released for: Amstrad CPC, Commodore 64, ZX Spectrum
- Release date: 1989

Released and licensed under the then-VFL branding of the AFL.

=== Aussie Rules Footy ===
- Developer: Beam Software
- Publisher: Mattel
- Released for: NES
- Release date: 1991

It was the first AFL video game. The game involves playing a game of Australian rules football from a third-person perspective, with the ability to perform the basic actions of a typical player of the sport. The game can be played by one person, or by two players against each other. There is also a kick to kick mode, and a season mode where one to six players can play multiple games in a season finishing with a grand final. It was developed by Beam Software, and was published by Mattel.

=== AFL Finals Fever ===
- Developer: Blue Tongue Entertainment
- Publisher: Cadability, EA Sports
- Released for: Microsoft Windows
- Release date: 9 June 1996

It was released solely for Microsoft Windows in 1996. Players could manage one of the 16 clubs of the 1996 AFL season. It was also the last video game in the series to feature the Fitzroy Lions and the Brisbane Bears as playable teams before they were merged. The game was also the first game to be developed by Blue Tongue Entertainment and was published by Cadability.

=== AFL 98 ===
- Developer: Creative Assembly
- Publisher: EA Sports
- Released for: Microsoft Windows
- Release date: 1997

It was released in 1997 for Microsoft Windows. It was based on the 1997 season. 16 teams were available in the game and it was the first in the series to feature Brisbane Lions and Port Adelaide. It is also the first game in the series to have commentary, which was provided by Bruce McAvaney. The game was developed by Creative Assembly and published by EA Sports.

=== AFL 99 ===
- Developer: Creative Assembly
- Publisher: EA Sports
- Released for: PlayStation, Microsoft Windows
- Release date: 1998

It was released in 1998 for the PlayStation and Microsoft Windows. It was based on the 1998 season and allowed play as any of the 16 teams. The commentary is provided by Bruce McAvaney and Leigh Matthews. The game was developed by Creative Assembly and published by EA Sports. The game's music was composed by Jeff van Dyck.

=== Kevin Sheedy AFL Coach 2002 ===
- Developer: IR Gurus
- Publisher: Acclaim Entertainment (Note: Released under the Acclaim Sports label)
- Released for: Microsoft Windows
- Release date: 2001

It was the first AFL video game to be developed by IR Gurus. The game was released as a PC only game. The player assumes the role of an AFL Coach and issues commands such as the type of play the team should play (attacking, defensive, Normal) and when to interchange.

=== AFL Live 2003 ===
- Developer: IR Gurus
- Publisher: Acclaim Entertainment (Note: Released under the Acclaim Sports label)
- Released for: Microsoft Windows, PlayStation 2, Xbox
- Release date: 12 September 2002 (PC), 16 September 2002 (PS2), 31 October 2002 (Xbox).

It was released in 2002 for Microsoft Windows, PlayStation 2 and Xbox. The game is based on the 2002 AFL season with team rosters. It was developed by IR Gurus and published by Acclaim Entertainment. It is also the first game in the series to feature a live action intro of AFL games in the 2003 season. A release in North America was planned on PlayStation 2 and PC via the official AFL website for North America, USFooty.com.

=== AFL Live 2004 ===
- Developer: IR Gurus
- Publisher: Acclaim Entertainment
- Released for: Microsoft Windows, PlayStation 2, Xbox
- Release date: 28 August 2003

It was released for Microsoft Windows, PlayStation 2 and Xbox in 2003. The game is based on the 2003 AFL season with team rosters based on that year. AFL Live 2004 includes all 16 official AFL teams and eight stadiums (MCG, Telstra Dome, Optus Oval, Kardinia Park, AAMI Stadium, Subiaco Oval, Gabba and SCG). It also included all 22 home and away matches and the finals series. The game was published by Acclaim with the song Lost Control by Grinspoon as the intro song. It was developed by IR Gurus.

=== AFL Live: Premiership Edition ===
- Developer: IR Gurus
- Publisher: Acclaim Entertainment, THQ
- Released for: Microsoft Windows (THQ), PlayStation 2, Xbox (Acclaim)
- Release date: 29 April 2004

It was released for Microsoft Windows, PlayStation 2 and Xbox on 29 April 2004. The game is based on the 2004 AFL season with team rosters based on that year. It was developed by IR Gurus and was the final AFL game to be published by Acclaim Entertainment, before their bankruptcy on 1 September 2004.

=== AFL Premiership 2005 ===
- Developer: IR Gurus
- Publisher: Sony Computer Entertainment, THQ
- Released for: Microsoft Windows, PlayStation 2 (Sony Computer Entertainment), Xbox (THQ)
- Release date: 2005

It is based on the 2005 AFL season. This is the next edition after AFL Premiership Edition. When Acclaim shut down its operations in Australia, Sony Computer Entertainment got publishing and distributing rights to the game. Because Sony Computer Entertainment had an exclusive period with the title, initially it was only launched on PlayStation 2. However, THQ released a Microsoft Windows and Xbox version of the game. It was released on 22 September 2005 and is only available in Australia.

=== AFL Premiership 2006 ===
- Developer: IR Gurus
- Publisher: Sony Computer Entertainment
- Released for: PlayStation 2
- Release date: 2006

AFL Premiership 2006 is the tenth game in the series. A follow-up to AFL Premiership 2005, it is based on the 2006 AFL season and was released only for the PlayStation 2. The revamped kicking system requires the players to time the button presses to kick straight, because holding it down for too long results in the ball turning in the opposite side. There are several modes: training mode (provides the basics), short match, Wizard Cup, Premiership and Finals. A newly introduced multiseason allows the management of certain team aspects. That includes things like improving player skills, trading players at the end of the season, and putting the emphasis on draft.

=== AFL Premiership 2007 ===
- Developer: IR Gurus
- Publisher: Sony Computer Entertainment
- Released for: PlayStation 2
- Release date: 28 June 2007

It is a simulation game for the PlayStation 2 based on the AFL. The game marks the final AFL game to be developed by Australian games company IR Gurus and was published by Sony Computer Entertainment, IR Gurus seventh collaboration in the series, and was released on 28 June 2007. The game includes all 16 teams, more than 600 AFL players with updated stats and all of the major stadium. Game modes in AFL Premiership 2007 are Single Match, Season Mode, Career Mode, Mission Mode and Training Mode. It was a follow-up to AFL Premiership 2006.

=== AFL Challenge ===
- Developer: Wicked Witch Software
- Publisher: Tru Blu Entertainment, Sony Computer Entertainment
- Released for: PlayStation Portable
- Release date: 10 September 2009

It was released for the PlayStation Portable. The game was developed by Wicked Witch Software and co-published by Tru Blu Entertainment and Sony Computer Entertainment. It was released on 10 September 2009. The game is based on the 2009 AFL season and includes all 16 teams and players.

=== AFL Live ===
- Developer: Big Ant Studios
- Publisher: Tru Blu Entertainment
- Released for: Microsoft Windows, PlayStation 3, Xbox 360
- Release date: 21 April 2011

It was released for Microsoft Windows, PlayStation 3 and Xbox 360 based on the 2011 AFL season. It was developed by Big Ant Studios and released on 21 April 2011. The Game of the Year Edition, an updated version of the game for the 2012 AFL season was released on 6 June 2012.

=== AFL ===
- Developer: Wicked Witch Software
- Publisher: Tru Blu Entertainment
- Released for: Wii, iOS
- Release date: 19 May 2011

It was released for Wii the same year as AFL Live, based on the 2011 AFL season. It features more management mechanics than Live, with a ten-year campaign, as well as multiplayer of up to 8 players. As with the other systems, a Game of the Year edition with 2012 players and locales was again released in June 2012.

=== AFL Live 2 ===
- Developer: Wicked Witch Software
- Publisher: Tru Blu Entertainment
- Released for: PlayStation 3, Xbox 360, iOS, Android
- Release date: 12 September 2013 (PS3, Xbox 360), 28 May 2015 (iOS), 26 September 2015 (Android)

It was released for PlayStation 3 and Xbox 360 on 12 September 2013. The 2014 Season Pack was released on 30 June 2014 for Xbox 360 and PlayStation 3 on 9 July 2014. A mobile port was released on iOS on 28 May 2015 and Android on 26 September 2015.

=== AFL Evolution ===
- Developer: Wicked Witch Software
- Publisher: Tru Blu Entertainment
- Released for: Microsoft Windows, PlayStation 4, Xbox One
- Release date: 5 May 2017 (PS4, Xbox One), 21 July 2017 (Windows)

It was developed by Wicked Witch Software and was released on 5 May 2017, for PlayStation 4 and Xbox One, with the Microsoft Windows version released on 21 July 2017, via Steam. The 2018 Season Pack was later released on 3 May 2018.

=== AFL Evolution 2 ===
- Developer: Wicked Witch Software
- Publisher: Tru Blu Entertainment
- Released for: Microsoft Windows, PlayStation 4, Xbox One, Nintendo Switch
- Release date: 16 April 2020 (PS4, Xbox One), 14 May 2020 (Switch), 11 September 2020 (Windows)

Serving as a sequel to 2017's AFL Evolution, it was released in 2020. The 2021 Season Pack was released on 7 May 2021.

=== AFL 23 ===
- Developer: Big Ant Studios
- Publisher: Nacon
- Released for: Microsoft Windows, PlayStation 4, Xbox One, PlayStation 5, Xbox Series X/S
- Release date: 4 May 2023 (Windows, PlayStation), 22 September 2023 (Xbox)

AFL 23 features 18 AFL and AFLW teams with over 1,200 players, with motion-captured animation, photo-realistic likenesses, in-depth skills and unique player traits powered by Champion Data.

The game was developed by Big Ant Studios, whose last AFL title was AFL Live in 2011. The game's release on Xbox was delayed for unspecified reasons.

=== AFL 26 ===
- Developer: Big Ant Studios
- Publisher: Nacon
- Released for: Microsoft Windows, PlayStation 4, Xbox One, PlayStation 5, Xbox Series X/S, Nintendo Switch 2
- Release date: 8 May 2025 (Windows, PlayStation, Xbox), TBA (Switch 2)

AFL 26 is the second AFL video game in a row to be developed by Big Ant Studios and published by Nacon. The game was released on 8 May 2025.

The game includes all the features from the previous game and will include a new player career mode last seen in AFL Evolution 2. There is also a brand new marking technique.

== Other titles ==
=== AFL Mascot Manor ===
It was released in the Nintendo DS on 2 July 2009. Focused more on the League's mascots than on the sport itself, the central component of the game is the adventure the player's mascot experiences in the themed worlds.
