= Heroes of the Pacific =

2005 video game

- European cover art
- Developer: IR Gurus
- Publishers: EU: Codemasters; NA: Ubisoft
- Producer: Ali Kojori (senior producer)
- Designers: Shane Collier; Justin Halliday
- Engine: RenderWare
- Platforms: PlayStation 2, Windows, Xbox
- Release: EU: September 23, 2005; NA: September 28, 2005; NA: October 25, 2005 (PC)
- Genre: Air combat simulation
- Modes: Single-player, multiplayer

Heroes of the Pacific is an aerial combat simulator game set in the Pacific Theater of Operations during World War II.

== Plot ==
The player assumes the role of William Crowe, an American who experiences the various phases of the Pacific War with Japan, beginning with the Pearl Harbor attack in December 1941. Crowe's brother Charlie is killed during the attack. He is restationed at Wake Island, where he comes under the command of Admiral Daniel Howells. He later participates in escorting Howells off the island as it is about to fall to the Japanese. When they make it to the Lexington, Crowe gets a new squadron consisting of Cunningham, Murphy, Slater, and commanded by Callahan. The Battle of the Coral Sea, the Battle of Midway, Guadalcanal, and the Marshall Islands are all featured in one or more missions. The final mission of the campaign is on February 23, 1945, with the raising of the United States flag on Iwo Jima.

== Gameplay ==
There are six game modes: Campaign, Instant Action, Single Mission, Historical, Training, and Multiplayer. One or two players can play simultaneously on the console, or up to eight players can play on the network via Xbox Live or using a PlayStation 2 with network adapter.

There are two different control schemes for flying the planes: Arcade and Professional. The Arcade control scheme allows for easier control via a single joystick with automatic rudders. However, the Professional controls offer separate control of the pitch, roll and yaw of the plane.

Heroes of the Pacific also offers multiple difficulty levels: Rookie, Pilot, Veteran, and Ace. Completing missions on higher difficulty unlocks more planes and rewards the player with more upgrade points, which can be used to upgrade unlocked aircraft after missions are accomplished.

This simulation also allows players to pilot famous planes such as the P-40 Warhawk, P-51 Mustang, F4U Corsair, P-47 Thunderbolt and a number of Japanese and German planes from World War II, including several experimental planes, such as the Blohm & Voss BV P.215 and the J7W Shinden.

Ten campaigns, with 26 missions taken from real events of the Pacific campaign. While some of the missions in the game require specific planes (such as the PBY Catalina), the player can usually choose which plane to fly from the allowable classes for each mission (Fighter, Dive Bombers, Torpedo Bombers, Bombers).

== Development ==
Heroes of the Pacific was developed by Melbourne development company Thatgame, who merged with IR Gurus shortly after the release of the game. In 2008, IR Gurus was renamed Transmission Games.

Many of the members of the development team previously worked together at Melbourne House, on titles such as Test Drive: Le Mans, Grand Prix Challenge, and KKnD2: Krossfire.

== Reception ==
Reception

Aggregate score
Aggregator	Score		
Aggregator	PC	PS2	Xbox
Metacritic	76/100	76/100	76/100

Review scores
Publication	Score		
Publication	PC	PS2	Xbox
Game Informer	N/A	8.75/10	8.75/10
GameRevolution	N/A	C	C
GameSpot	7/10	7.2/10	7.2/10
GameSpy	3.5/5	3.5/5	4/5
GameTrailers	7.2/10	N/A	N/A
GameZone	8/10	7.6/10	8/10
IGN	8/10	8.1/10	8.2/10
Official U.S. PlayStation Magazine	N/A	3.5/5	N/A
Official Xbox Magazine (US)	N/A	N/A	8/10
PC Gamer (US)	81%	N/A	N/A
VideoGamer.com	7/10	7/10	7/10
The Sydney Morning Herald	4/5	4/5	4/5

According to the review aggregation website Metacritic, Heroes of the Pacific received "generally favorable" reviews on all platforms.

== See also ==
- Heroes Over Europe - the sequel to Heroes of the Pacific.
- Secret Weapons Over Normandy - LucasArts' World War II flying game that was released in 2003.
- Blazing Angels: Squadrons of WWII - the first of the Blazing Angels series of games, released 6 months after Heroes of the Pacific.
