= Heroes Over Europe =

2009 video game

- Developer: Transmission Games
- Publisher: Ubisoft
- Platforms: Xbox 360, Microsoft Windows, PlayStation 3
- Release: NA: 8 September 2009 (PC); NA: 15 September 2009; AU: 17 September 2009; EU: 18 September 2009
- Genre: Combat flight simulation
- Modes: Single-player, multiplayer

Heroes Over Europe is a 2009 combat flight simulation video game developed by Transmission Games and published by Ubisoft for Xbox 360, PlayStation 3 and Microsoft Windows. It is the sequel to Heroes of the Pacific.

Heroes Over Europe follows three pilots - an American (Captain Tom Forester) who flies with first the British and later the Americans, a Briton (Captain Danny Miller), and a New Zealander (Flight Lieutenant Will West) - through fourteen missions during World War II beginning in June 1940 and ending in January 1945. The game features over 40 World War II planes and online support for 16 players in Dogfight, Team Dogfight, Survivor, and Team Survivor game modes.

The game was originally planned to be published by Atari, but the company dropped out of publishing the title and instead sold it to Ubisoft in July 2009.

== Plot ==
Captain Tom Forester is an American man from Cleveland, Ohio, who wants to become a pilot as his father (who fought in WWI against the Germans in the Lafayette Escadrille) as WWII begins. He manages to be accepted in the No 79th squadron RAF which is sent to Western Alps, France. Forester meets Captain Clifford Stone, his squadron leader and they soon become friends. During the training and their scout with their Hawker Hurricanes they find a formation of six Ju 88 German bombers, which are all downed by Forester before the arrival of three Me 109 German fighters, but they are all hit by Tom which go through the scout and finds two more Messerschmitt fighters: one is downed by Stone with an "Ace Kill" and Forester manages to do the same. Later, they keep on they scout mission and find three German convoys of trucks and armoured vehicles, which are all destroyed by Forester before the arrival of four Me109 fighters (one of whom is a squad leader) which are too shot down by Forester using Ace Kills all times. After the destruction of the last enemy aircraft the two pilots both come back to the air base.

After the conquest of France, the No 79th Squadron is sent back to England, operating from Biggin Hill air base, south of London. One month later Stone and Forester are sent in a CAP mission along the south coast. After a new of a spotting of a German plane, the two pilots reach a convoy. As they turn to get back to the coast, they are attacked by a Me 109 fighter and five Me 110 light bombers which try to sink the three merchant ships of the convoy. All the Germans are downed, but soon afterwards a flight of German Ju 87 "Stuka" dive-bombers attack the Allied oil and fuel tanks in the Dover's port. Another three flights of five Stukas each are destroyed by Forester who soon destroys several naval mines to make three merchant ships reach the port undamaged. The RDF stations later detect two formations of German Ju 88 and Do 17 bombers which are destroyed by Forester. After destroying the bombers, Forester intercepted the last enemy fighters helping Stone to destroy them all. The mission ends with both pilots coming back to base.

The next mission focus on another pilot: Captain Danny Miller, a British man from Liverpool who entered the RAF as the war began. In his first mission, Miller has to intercept a flight of six Me 110 heavy fighters deployed as an escort for He 111 bombers which are going to arrive on the town of London to bomb it. After shooting down the six enemies, Miller attacks an entire group of dozens of enemy He 111 bombers. The player can destroy however many bombers they like, but the bombers will still reach the House of Parliament the mission will end and the bombers will drop their bombs on the Parliament and Big Ben. The mission is later revealed to be a dream sequence.

The third mission returns to Forester and Stone on the day of Adlertag, when the Luftwaffe bombed the British air bases: the duo are the only pilots able to take off and intercept the following waves of Heinkel He 111 bombers, shooting them down. At the same pilot, Forester has to destroy two Me 109 fighters which are attacking an observation station. After the German planes are destroyed, the Allied pilots fly to Lympne air base and find it under attack from a squadron of twelve German Bf 109 which are strafing the British Spitfires of the No 610th Squadron. Then, a control call tells Forester that an unauthorized aircraft is trying to reach the English Channel, but the plane is later damaged to one engine by Forester with an "Ace Kill". After that, all the British planes reach Dover and attack the German formations of Bf 109 fighters, before the arrival of German bombers from inland. All the German planes are destroyed, and Forester returns to base with Stone and Wandsworth, a new friend of the No 610th Squadron.

== Reception ==
Reception

Aggregate score
Aggregator	Score		
Aggregator	PC	PS3	Xbox 360
Metacritic	65/100	62/100	62/100

Review scores
Publication	Score		
Publication	PC	PS3	Xbox 360
Game Informer	6.5/10	6.5/10	6.5/10
GamePro	N/A	4/5	4/5
GameRevolution	N/A	C−	C−
GameSpot	N/A	5/10	5/10
GameZone	N/A	N/A	5.4/10
IGN	6/10	(AU) 7.5/10 (US) 6/10	(AU) 7.5/10 (US) 6/10
Official Xbox Magazine (US)	N/A	N/A	5/10
PC Gamer (UK)	70%	N/A	N/A
PlayStation: The Official Magazine	N/A	3.5/5	N/A
VideoGamer.com	6/10	6/10	6/10
411Mania	N/A	6.5/10	N/A

The game received "mixed" reviews on all platforms according to the review aggregation website Metacritic.
