= Lucinda Green's Equestrian Challenge =

2006 video game

- Developer: IR Gurus
- Publisher: Red Mile Entertainment
- Platforms: PlayStation 2, Microsoft Windows
- Release: November 21, 2006 (PS2)
- Genre: Sports game

Lucinda Green's Equestrian Challenge is a 2006 sports video game by Australian developer IR Gurus Interactive and published by Red Mile Entertainment for PlayStation 2 and Microsoft Windows. The game is named after Lucinda Green, a six-time Badminton Horse Trials winner, who also serves as in game mentor.

== Reception ==
Reception

Review scores
Publication	Score
IGN	PS2: 6.6/10
Jeuxvideo.com	PS2/PC: 14.4/20
PC Gamer (UK)	PC: 51%

IGN felt it offered a more professional experience than contemporary horse-related games, and deemed it an "off-beat, niche title" from the developer. JeuxVideo wrote that it " manages to strike a balance between its ambitions of pure simulation and its desire for accessibility to a wide audience". Lapresse notes that many horse themes titles were released throughout 2007. Jeuxactu felt it would carry players over until the next major release in the genre. Heise wrote that it was "quite unmistakably a computer game for girls". Meanwhile, PSM3 Magazine UK said "LGEC works, just, but there's really 'neigh' point in playing it".
