= AFL Evolution =

2017 video game

- Packaging artwork, featuring Chad Wingard, Marcus Bontempelli, and Isaac Heeney
- Developer: Wicked Witch Software
- Publisher: Tru Blu Entertainment
- Series: AFL
- Platforms: PlayStation 4 Xbox One; Windows
- Release: PlayStation 4, Xbox One; 5 May 2017; Microsoft Windows; 21 July 2017
- Genre: Sports
- Modes: Single-player, multiplayer

AFL Evolution is a video game based on the AFL developed by Wicked Witch Software and published by Tru Blu Entertainment in 2017 for PlayStation 4, Xbox One and Microsoft Windows. A demo containing player and team creation tools was released on 5 April 2017. The game was released on 5 May 2017 for PlayStation 4 and Xbox One, and for Microsoft Windows via Steam on 21 July 2017.

== Gameplay ==
AFL Evolution has three different career modes: the players can start as a coach, a listed player, or the created character. The coach mode revolves around running a team while handling tasks such as training schedules, finances and staff management. Besides playing single matches against the AI, up to four players can play online in multiplayer.

‘Be a pro’-type modes in games such as FIFA and NBA 2K allow the player to create a character and guide them through their career. You can start as an under 18, work your way up, play in the VFL and eventually get signed by an AFL team. the player will be able to leave after the season if they don't like the team their character is placed on, while also being able to start a career as an existing player or avoid the whole pre-AFL process entirely and jump straight into the elite competition. Also returning from AFL Live 2 is manager career mode, which is very similar to 'be a pro' mode in the way that you can start from the U18 TAC Cup and work your way up, or you can jump straight into the AFL. Manager career mode also takes gamers beyond the field of play allowing them to manage the team via the drafting and trading of players, the salary cap, training, the tribunal and much more. Online mode enables the players go head-to-head in competitive and co-operative online multiplayer. During the match, the player can pull off speckies, shown in slow motion from several angles.

There are two camera angle views to be chosen from: default and end-to-end with two options in locked and dynamic. The dynamic option makes the rotation change, depending on the ball's current possession. At the bottom of the screen, a mini-map can be found that contains targets indicators.

As the game has a full AFL license, AFL Women's, TAC Cup and Victorian Football League are integrated into the teams selection. All stadiums were faithfully replicated, along with the advertising and sponsors. In addition to that, AFL Evolution uses Seven Network's score graphics and commentary by Dennis Cometti and Matthew Richardson.

== Release ==
On 3 May 2018, Wicked Witch Software launched a season pack which added the Western Australian Football League, the South Australian National Football League and the North East Australian Football League. It also added Perth Stadium, updated Kardinia Park, the squads and guernsies.

== Reception ==
Upon release, AFL Evolution received generally mixed reviews. Press Start Australia gave the game a 6/10. Fox Sports Australia gave the game a 6/10 and 7Sport gave the game a 6.5/10.
