= AFL 26 =

- Developer: Big Ant Studios
- Publisher: Nacon
- Series: AFL
- Platforms: Windows; PlayStation 4; PlayStation 5; Xbox One; Xbox Series X/S; Nintendo Switch 2
- Release: Windows, PlayStation 4, PlayStation 5, Xbox One, Xbox Series X/S; 8 May 2025; Nintendo Switch 2; 31 March 2026
- Genre: Sports
- Modes: Single-player, multiplayer

AFL 26 is a video game based on Australian rules football league AFL, developed by Big Ant Studios and published by Nacon. It was released on 8 May 2025 on Microsoft Windows, PlayStation 4, PlayStation 5, Nintendo Switch 2, Xbox One and Xbox Series X. This is the second game in a row developed by Big Ant Studios and published by Nacon in the AFL video game series.

== Development and release ==
AFL 26 was leaked on the Australian Classification Board's website on 8 April 2025, and was later announced the same day on a Big Ant Studio's Twitter post. The game was also added onto the JB Hi-Fi and EB Games Australia websites with the game cover revealed. Unlike the previous AFL video game, AFL 26 was released on the expected release date.

== Reception ==
Reception

Aggregate scores
Aggregator	Score
Metacritic	(PS5) 75/100 (Note: Based on 4 reviews)
OpenCritic	75/100 (Note: Based on 4 reviews)

On release, the game received mostly negative reviews on Steam, with 33% of users giving a positive review. This has since improved to 57% of users giving a positive review as of November 1st, 2026. The game did not have as many game-breaking bugs as AFL 23 did, but still had many bugs, some causing Xbox users being unable to play the game.

Matt Sainsbury of DigitallyDownloaded.net rated the PS5 version of the game 4.5/5 stars, praising the gameplay and effort put into the game while also stating "What’s more, Big Ant’s still patching away. It’s going to be fascinating to see where this one ends up in a year."

Dean Milhe of Press-Start.com.au gave the game 7.5/10, praising the game for being a massive improvement on AFL 23 but criticizing the game's AI for making poor decisions during gameplay and the fact that in-game Legends were exclusivly locked to the game's Pro Team mode and are unavalible to be used in offline modes.

Ben Salter of Stevivor.com gave the game 6.5/10, saying "AFL 26 is for the fans who love their footy enough to forgive the rough edges, push through the clunky gameplay, and accept the long-standing frustrations that have plagued AFL games for decades and likely always will, to chase their dream of lifting the Premiership Cup."
