= AFL Premiership 2005 =

2005 video game

- PlayStation 2 cover art
- Developer: IR Gurus
- Publishers: Sony Computer Entertainment (PS2); THQ (Windows, Xbox)
- Series: AFL
- Engine: RenderWare
- Platforms: PlayStation 2; Xbox; Microsoft Windows
- Release: AU: 22 September 2005
- Genre: Sports
- Modes: Single-player, multiplayer

AFL Premiership 2005 is a sports game developed by IR Gurus and published by Sony Computer Entertainment for the PlayStation 2. A separate version for Microsoft Windows and Xbox was released by THQ. It is based on the Australian Football League (AFL) and is the ninth game in the AFL video game series.

== Gameplay ==
The game features two modes: Season mode, where the player selects one of the 16 teams to play in the 2005 AFL season, and Career Mode, which includes the pre-season, home and away season, and finals. There is also, player trading, National AFL draft and player development. AFL Tribunal is also used with in-game reports and suspensions. The company changed the annual numbering system for titles with the AFL Live Premiership Edition, but this edition would have been AFL Live 2006.

AFL Premiership 2005 supports online multiplayer. On the Xbox port, Xbox Live was available to players until 15 April 2010. The game is now playable online again on the replacement Xbox Live servers called Insignia.

== Stadiums and features ==
The game includes all 16 teams, more than 600 AFL players with updated stats and eight major stadiums which include:

New South Wales

- SCG (Sydney)
- Telstra Stadium (Homebush Bay)

Queensland

- Gabba (Brisbane)

South Australia

- AAMI Stadium (Adelaide)

(Victoria (state)) Victoria

- MCG (Melbourne)
- Telstra Dome (Docklands)
- Skilled Stadium (Geelong)

Western Australia

- Subiaco Oval (Perth)

== Publisher ==
When Acclaim shut down its operations in Australia, Sony Computer Entertainment (SCEE) took over the publishing and distributing rights to the game. Originally it was only on the PlayStation 2. However, THQ released an Xbox and Microsoft Windows version of the game. THQ only called the game AFL Premiumship. The game is only available in Australia.
