= Transmission Games =

Australian video game developer (1996–2009)

- Formerly: IR Gurus (1996-2008)
- Industry: Video game industry
- Founded: 1996
- Defunct: 2009
- Headquarters: Melbourne, Australia
- Key people: 1996–2007: Craig Laughton; Andrew Niere; Ian Cunliffe; Nathan Murphy; 2007-2009: Mike Fegan; Ben Palmer; Anthony Reed

Transmission Games (originally known as IR Gurus) was an Australian video game developer that specialised in sports and action games. Transmission Games was established as IR Gurus Pty Ltd in 1996 by Craig Laughton, Andrew Niere, and Ian Cunliffe with the motto "Game Play is Everything". The company name was changed in February 2008 to Transmission Games and was later purchased by a third-party investor. The company was subsequently closed some 18 months later by the new owner.

Transmission Games developed many games, including Ashes Cricket 2009 for PlayStation 3, Xbox 360, and PC; Heatseeker for the PlayStation 2, Wii, and PSP; Heroes of the Pacific for the PlayStation 2, Xbox, and PC; the AFL Premiership series for the PlayStation 2; and The Saddle Club – Willowbrook Stables.

The company was based in Melbourne, Australia, and its last games released were Ashes Cricket 2009 (which was published by Codemasters), Heatseeker, AFL Premiership 2007, and Brian Lara Pressure Play.

== Development history ==
Transmission Games released fifteen games between 1996 and 2009, including Australia's number one-selling PC game for 2003, The Saddle Club – Willowbrook Stables based on the successful TV show The Saddle Club. Transmission Games's AFL games, including Kevin Sheedy AFL Coach 2002, AFL Live 2003, AFL Live 2004, AFL Live Premiership Edition, AFL Premiership 2005, AFL Premiership 2006, and AFL Premiership 2007 all debuted at number one on the Australian sales charts, with AFL Premiership 2006 staying at the top of the all-formats charts for six weeks.

== Arcade flight games ==
In 2005, Transmission Games released the award-winning arcade-style flight simulation game Heroes of the Pacific for the PC, PS2, and Xbox formats and was originally developed by startup Melbourne studio Thatgame, which later merged with IR Gurus. Heroes of the Pacific was published in PAL territories by Codemasters and in NTSC territories by Ubisoft. Heroes of the Pacific garnered favourable reviews (averaging 76–78% across all platforms), and received a number of awards, including Australian Game of the Year and PC Game of the Year from the Game Developer's Association of Australia in 2005.

Following Heroes of the Pacific, Transmission Games co-developed Heatseeker, a modern flight combat game, with Codemasters. Heatseeker was released in Europe on 30 March 2007. Heroes Over Europe, the sequel to Heroes of the Pacific, was released in September 2009.

== Sports games ==
In 2001, IR Gurus began development of stadium-based sports titles. They released AFL Live 2003 in October 2002, followed by AFL Live 2004 in September 2003 which was published by Acclaim Entertainment. IR Gurus continued to develop AFL games, including AFL Live Premiership Edition released in April 2004, AFL Premiership 2005 released in September 2005, AFL Premiership 2006 released in July 2006, and finally AFL Premiership 2007 released in June 2007.

In addition, Transmission Games developed the officially licensed GAA Gaelic football game Gaelic Games: Football exclusively for the PlayStation 2 and published by Sony Computer Entertainment on 11 November 2005. Following its release, Gaelic Games: Football was the highest-selling PlayStation 2 game of all time in Ireland, but was infamous for its abysmal performance, lack of difficulty, and lazy game design. Sequels followed with Gaelic Games: Hurling and Gaelic Games: Football 2 in November 2007 to marginally better reputation. Both of these games were developed exclusively for the PlayStation 2 and published by Sony Computer Entertainment of Ireland.

In 2007, Transmission Games worked with fellow Melbourne company Acheron Design to develop Brian Lara Pressure Play, a PSP version of Codemasters's Brian Lara series of cricket games. The game debuted at number one on the UK sales charts when it was released in mid-2007.

Transmission Games' last sports game release was Ashes Cricket 2009, the latest in the Codemasters' series of cricket games, formerly known as Brian Lara International Cricket. The game was released in August 2009 in England and Australia. The game debuted at number one in the All Formats UK charts.

== Equestrian games ==
Transmission Games was also known for development and publishing of equestrian-related computer and console game titles. From 1996 to early 2000, Transmission Games developed its own equestrian computer games Mary King's Riding Star and Equestriad in conjunction with Melbourne software companies Blue Tongue Entertainment and Tantalus Interactive. Both Mary King's Riding Star and Equestriad continue to have worldwide appeal and have been sold on the PC and PlayStation formats in seven different languages. In 2002, Transmission Games released The Saddle Club – Willowbrook Stables, featuring the license from The Saddle Club television show.

In 2007, Transmission Games released Lucinda Green's Equestrian Challenge on PlayStation 2 and PC. Lucinda Green's Equestrian Challenge is an equestrian game based on the sport of 3-day horse eventing. The game features Show Jumping, Dressage and Cross Country events.

== Games ==
- Heroes Over Europe (2009)
- Ashes Cricket 2009 (2009)
- Gaelic Games: Hurling (2007)
- Gaelic Games: Football 2 (2007)
- Brian Lara Pressure Play (2007)
- AFL Premiership 2007 (2007)
- Heatseeker (2007)
- Lucinda Green's Equestrian Challenge (2006)
- AFL Premiership 2006 (2006)
- Heroes of the Pacific (2005)
- Gaelic Games: Football (2005)
- AFL Premiership 2005 (2005)
- AFL Live Premiership Edition (2004)
- AFL Live 2004 (2003)
- AFL Live 2003 (2002)
- Kevin Sheedy AFL Coach 2002 (2002)
- The Saddle Club – Willowbrook Stables (2002)
- Equestriad (2001)
- Mary King's Riding Star (1999)
