= AFL Premiership 2007 =

2007 video game

- PlayStation 2 cover art
- Developer(s): IR Gurus
- Publisher(s): SCEE
- Series: AFL
- Engine: RenderWare
- Platform(s): PlayStation 2
- Release: AU: 28 June 2007
- Genre(s): Sports simulation
- Mode(s): Multiplayer

AFL Premiership 2007 is a sports simulation game for the PlayStation 2 based on the Australian Football League. It is a follow-up game to AFL Premiership 2006. It was developed by game developer, IR Gurus and published by Sony Computer Entertainment Europe. It is the final game in the series to be developed by IR Gurus. The game was released, only in Australia, on 28 June 2007.

== Gameplay ==
Single match is the quickest way to play a game. On the single match summary screen you can set your favourite team and then randomise the other settings. Such as, home and away teams, stadium, weather, and rules (pre-season or home and away season rules). Mission Mode allows you to take up the challenge and feel the pressure with these historical matches. Each mission has a handicap that a team must overcome; from seemingly impossible score deficits, to slim leads with seconds left on the clock. Career Mode takes you from season to season, including a calendar view of the fixtures, training to guide your players’ development, season stats for all the players in the league, leaderboards for all stats categories, Brownlow, Coleman, Club best and fairest awards, Best on Ground awards for each match.

=== Eye toy ===
The game includes support for the Cameo EyeToy and DigiMask that allows up to four players to put their heads into the game on top of one of the players. Four-player multiplayer is supported using the PS2 multitap.

== Stadiums and features ==
The game includes all 16 teams, more than 600 AFL players with updated stats and all of the major stadiums. Game modes include Single Match, Season Mode, Career Mode, Mission Mode and Training Mode.
