= Heatseeker (video game) =

2007 video game

- Developers: IR Gurus; Halfbrick (PSP)
- Publisher: Codemasters
- Platforms: Wii, PlayStation 2, PlayStation Portable
- Release: Wii, PlayStation 2: EU: 30 March 2007; AU: 13 April 2007; NA: 1 May 2007; PlayStation Portable: NA: 8 May 2007; EU: 25 May 2007; AU: 1 June 2007
- Genre: Combat flight simulation game
- Mode: Single player

Heatseeker is a combat flight simulator video game for the Wii, PlayStation 2, and PlayStation Portable game systems developed by IR Gurus (now Transmission Games) and published by Codemasters.

== Story ==
Players take on the role of an International Council pilot Mike "Downtown" Hudson, often accompanied by wingman Hank "Divot" Harrison. The game begins with a terrorist attack. The plot follows the International Council's attempt to thwart a dangerous dictator with an advanced nuclear cache named Bae Jung-Tae. Along the way, the player uses their flying and fighting skills to tackle a range enemies in the air, on land and at sea.

== Gameplay ==
Heatseeker is an aerial combat game that pits players against a variety of computer-controlled airborne opponents. Players are equipped with modern military hardware and a choice of weapons. The game offers players access to 17 jets and 37 different weapons.

Missions take place over Korea, the Caribbean and Antarctica. Heatseeker has a display feature called ImpactCam, which allows the player to follow the progress of a missile once it is fired through to impact, from several camera angles. Environments are destructible, and players can blow up bridges, airports, docks, and military bases. The game offers players the choice between first and third person viewpoints.

== Reception ==
Reception

Aggregate score
Aggregator	Score		
Aggregator	PS2	PSP	Wii
Metacritic	60/100	49/100	62/100

Review scores
Publication	Score		
Publication	PS2	PSP	Wii
1Up.com	N/A	N/A	D+
The A.V. Club	N/A	N/A	B−
Edge	5/10	N/A	N/A
Eurogamer	5/10	N/A	5/10
Game Informer	N/A	N/A	7.5/10
GameSpot	5.7/10	5.1/10	5.4/10
GameSpy	2.5/5	N/A	2.5/5
GameTrailers	6.2/10	N/A	6.2/10
GameZone	5.7/10	N/A	6/10
IGN	4.8/10	4/10	(UK) 7.6/10 (US) 5.5/10
Nintendo Power	N/A	N/A	7.5/10
PlayStation Official Magazine – UK	(OPS2) 7/10; 6/10	6/10	N/A
Pocket Gamer	N/A	2.5/5	N/A
PlayStation: The Official Magazine	6.5/10	N/A	N/A

The PlayStation 2 and Wii versions received "mixed" reviews, while the PSP version received "generally unfavorable reviews", according to the review aggregation website Metacritic.
