= AFL 23 =

- Developer: Big Ant Studios
- Publisher: Nacon
- Series: AFL
- Platforms: Windows; PlayStation 4; PlayStation 5; Xbox One; Xbox Series X/S
- Release: Windows, PlayStation 4, PlayStation 5; 4 May 2023; Xbox One, Xbox Series X/S; 22 September 2023
- Genre: Sports
- Modes: Single-player, multiplayer

AFL 23 is a 2023 Australian rules football simulation video game developed by Big Ant Studios and published by Nacon. It was released in May 2023 for Microsoft Windows, PlayStation 4 and PlayStation 5, and after a long delay, it was finally released for the Xbox One and Xbox Series X in September 2023. The game is the most recent installment in the long-running AFL video game series, and the first to be developed by Big Ant since AFL Live in 2011.

== Gameplay ==
AFL 23 is an Australian rules football simulation video game which strives to emulate the Australian Football League (AFL) and AFL Women's. While the title is centred around the two pre-eminent professional leagues, it also includes several second-tier state leagues featuring both men's and women's competitions. Players mostly play AFL football games with real or created players and teams. The game features commentary from Anthony Hudson, Jason Bennett, Kelli Underwood, Garry Lyon and Daniel Harford, and its visual presentation aims to replicate that used on Seven Sport's AFL coverage.

Along with standard quick play and online game modes, several other game modes are present. Season mode allows the player to play through an entire season in their selected league, controlling either the full competition or just one club. Management career expands on season mode to allow the player to control the club's finances, personnel, drafting and trading over multiple years. A card-based game known as Pro Team, similar to that of EA Sports' Ultimate Team modes, was announced in April 2023, but as of May 2024 it is yet to be included. In July 2024, Pro Team was finally released in an update.

Big Ant's popular Academy tool, first seen in Don Bradman Cricket 14, allows users to create custom players, clubs, guernseys and stadiums that can be imported in-game for use in various modes. Academy creations can also be shared among online users via the 'community' tab.

== Leagues and stadiums ==
All 18 AFL and AFLW clubs from the 2023 AFL season and 2022 AFLW season 6 are in the game. All AFL teams have bonus guernseys, including older uniforms that are no longer worn, without sponsorship. There are 40 stadiums in AFL 23.

=== List of leagues ===
- Australian Football League
- AFL Women's
- Victorian Football League
- VFL Women's
- South Australian National Football League
- SANFL Women's League
- West Australian Football League
- WAFL Women's

=== List of stadiums ===
- Adelaide Oval – South Australia
- Alberton Oval – South Australia
- Arden Street – Victoria
- Blundstone Arena – Tasmania
- Box Hill City Oval – Victoria
- Brighton Homes Arena - Queensland
- Casey Fields – Victoria
- Cazalys Stadium – Queensland
- Chirnside Park – Victoria
- Coburg City Oval – Victoria
- Fremantle Oval – Western Australia
- Giants Stadium – New South Wales
- GMHBA Stadium – Victoria
- Great Barrier Reef Arena – Queensland
- Henson Park – New South Wales
- Heritage Bank Stadium – Queensland
- Ikon Park – Victoria
- Kinetic Stadium – Victoria
- Manuka Oval – Australian Capital Territory
- Mars Stadium – Victoria
- Marvel Stadium – Victoria
- Melbourne Cricket Ground – Victoria
- Mineral Resources Park – Western Australia
- North Port Oval – Victoria
- North Sydney Oval – New South Wales
- Norwood Oval – South Australia
- Optus Stadium – Western Australia
- Preston City Oval – Victoria
- RSEA Park – Victoria
- Swinburne Centre Punt Road Oval – Victoria
- Summit Sports Park – South Australia
- Sydney Cricket Ground – New South Wales
- The Gabba – Queensland
- TIO Stadium – Northern Territory
- TIO Traeger Park – Northern Territory
- UTAS Stadium – Tasmania
- Victoria Park – Victoria
- VU Whitten Oval – Victoria
- Williamstown Cricket Ground – Victoria
- Wilson Storage Trevor Barker Beach Oval – Victoria

== Development and release ==
The game was originally set to be released on 13 April 2023. The game was then delayed to 4 May, supposedly due to physical copies of the Xbox versions not yet being in Australia. Days before the new launch date, it was announced that the Xbox versions of the game would again be delayed until mid to late June. The PS4, PS5 and Windows versions of the game were still released on 4 May.

On 16 June, Big Ant Studios announced further delays to the Xbox release, this time until "late July to early August". This time period again passed without any release or comment from the developers. On 17 August, a customer support representative from JB Hi-Fi explained that the Xbox release was delayed until 31 October. The Xbox versions of the game were eventually released on 22 September 2023.

== Reception ==
AFL 23 received mixed to negative reviews on release and was initially plagued by game-breaking bugs and crashes. The game currently holds a 'mixed' rating on Steam, with only 44% of players leaving a positive recommendation as of August 2023.
