= AFL (2011 video game) =

- Game cover
- Developer: Wicked Witch Software
- Publisher: Tru Blu Entertainment
- Series: AFL
- Platforms: Wii, iOS
- Release: Wii: AU: 19 May 2011; Game of the Year Edition: AU: 12 July 2012; iOS; 14 December 2011
- Genre: Sports
- Modes: Single-player, multiplayer

AFL is an AFL sports game for the Wii and iOS. It was developed by Wicked Witch Software. It was released on 19 May 2011. Commentating is provided by Dennis Cometti and Brian Taylor.

== Game features ==
- 16 stadiums
- 5 different leagues (AFL, VFL, TAC Cup, NAB U18's National Championships, International Cup).
- Over 70 licensed teams
- Arcade style gameplay
- 29 player attributes
- 10 year career management mode.
- 5 mini games.

== Gameplay ==
Team management appears to focus on coaching, training, trading, drafting, tribunal and budget, while the in game gameplay, covers the actual game of the sport itself. The game has more arcade elements then the Big Ant Studios version, but claims to still maintain a fair amount of simulation and options to set the level of this. On screen meters can also be turned on and off.

The game supports 3 controller types; The standard Wii remote, the Wii remote with the Nunchuck and the GameCube Controller. Wicked Witch stated that the controls are intuitive but can take time to learn. Wii remote shaking is used to successfully tackle or break a tackle. There are 4 types of kicks including Drop Punts, Torpedoes, Snaps (Check Sides) and Grubbers but only 1 type of handball which increases in elevation depending on power.

The game also features a ten-year manager mode.

=== Multiplayer ===
Multiplayer supports up to 8 players but does not include online gameplay. Players can drop in and out of a career game.

== AFL: Gold Edition ==
AFL: Gold Edition is an iOS AFL simulation video game based on the 2011 AFL season, released on 14 December 2011. The 2012 AFL season update was released on 4 June 2012.

== Game of the Year Edition ==
The Game of the Year Edition was released on 12 July 2012 for the Wii. It is an update for the 2012 AFL season, with updated team lists and on-field uniforms for the 2012 season, Skoda Stadium is to be playable and the ability to play as the Greater Western Sydney Giants.

== See also ==
- AFL Live
