= Australian Rules Football (1989 video game) =

1989 video game

- Developer: Keith A Goodyer
- Publisher: Alternative Software
- Platforms: C64; ZX Spectrum; Amstrad CPC
- Release: AU: 1989
- Genre: Sports
- Modes: Single-player; Multiplayer

Australian Rules Football is an Australian rules football video game developed by Keith A Goodyer and published by Alternative Software. It was released in 1989 for the Commodore 64, ZX Spectrum and Amstrad CPC.
