= AFL Live 2 =

2013 video game

- Cover art
- Developer(s): Tru Blu Entertainment
- Publisher(s): Tru Blu Entertainment
- Series: AFL
- Platform(s): PlayStation 3, Xbox 360, iOS, Android
- Release: PlayStation 3 & Xbox 360 12 September 2013 iOS; 28 May 2015; Android 26 September 2015
- Genre(s): Sports
- Mode(s): Single-player, multiplayer

AFL Live 2 is a sports game in the AFL series of Australian rules football video games. It was developed by Wicked Witch Software and was released for PlayStation 3 and Xbox 360 on 12 September 2013. The game was ported to iOS and was released on 28 May 2015 and Android on 26 September 2015. Commentary is provided by Dennis Cometti and Tom Harley.

== Gameplay ==
New features added to AFL Live 2 include, a 15-year career mode, fending off, shepherding and a detailed control over players and on-field maneuvering. There are over 60 teams from TAC Cup, VFL, AFL, and various bonus teams.

=== Career mode ===
A new career mode has been added, spanning 15 years, allowing to manage players and teams from the TAC Cup and VFL into the AFL. The career manager mode gives the player control over training, where experience and individual statistics can be gained. Sponsorships, staffing, tribunal, emails, drafting and trading are also included.

== Development ==
The game's existence was originally leaked in early 2013 by several sources. On 27 June 2013, it was classified by the Australian Classification Board, listed as being multi platform and the publisher to be Tru Blu Entertainment. On 5 July 2013, Tru Blu Entertainment announced the game on their official Facebook page.

== Season Pack 2014 ==
Season Pack 2014 is an update DLC for the 2014 AFL season, with updated team lists, on-field uniforms, player ratings, sponsors, alternative controller mapping, stadiums and a number of other features and improvements. It was made available on The PlayStation Network for PlayStation 3 and Xbox Live Marketplace for both Xbox 360 and Microsoft Windows on 30 June 2014.

== Reception ==
AFL Live 2 has received average reviews, with a 55% aggregate rating on GameRankings.
