= Aussie Rules Footy =

1991 video game

- Developer: Beam Software
- Publisher: Laser Beam
- Producer: Sue Anderson
- Programmers: Darren Bremner; Gregg Barnett; Andrew Davie
- Artists: Paul Mitchell; Grant Arthur
- Composer: Marshall Parker
- Series: AFL
- Platform: Nintendo Entertainment System
- Release: AU: 1991
- Genre: Sports
- Modes: Single-player, multiplayer

Aussie Rules Footy is the first AFL simulation video game for the Nintendo Entertainment System. It was developed by Melbourne-based Beam Software and published under their "Laser Beam" publishing title in 1991. The release was Australian-only, with distribution handled through Mattel's Australian operations.

== Gameplay ==
The game involves playing a game of Australian rules football from a third-person perspective, with the ability to perform the basic actions of a typical Australian rules football player. The game can be played by one person playing against the computer team, or by two players against each other. There is also a kick-to-kick mode, and a season mode where 1, 4 or 6 players can play multiple games in a season, finishing with a grand final.

The objective of the game is for the players team to have the highest score at the end of the game. A team can score by kicking either a goal (6 points) or a behind (1 point). To move the football, a player with the ball can either kick or handball the ball, and a player without the ball can either mark the ball or tackle an opposition player with the ball.

=== Scoring ===
When a player is close to the goal (approx. 55–60 meters), an accuracy bar appears at the bottom of the screen. When the ball is kicked, the closer the marker is to the centre of the bar, the more accurate the kick to goal. The accuracy bar makes it considerably difficult to kick a goal on the run, especially from a distance. When a player is very close to the goal (approx. 15 metres), the accuracy marker will always be in the centre of the bar, and any kick by the player will be a goal.

=== Start of play ===
As in the real rules of Australian rules football, there are times in play where a player from each team tries to take possession of the ball that has been bounced (for the start of play after a goal, or a ball-up), or thrown (for an out of bounds) by the umpire. During a bounce, using the arrow keys will start the player moving, only after the ball has touched the ground. Pressing A at the moment of contact will tap the ball to another team member, while pressing B will knock the ball a larger distance but not to a particular player. During a ball-up or a boundary throw-in, pressing A will make the player leap into the air, and then the same actions apply as a bounce when the player reaches the ball with his hand.

== Teams ==
The teams in the game are based on 14 of the 15 teams in the 1991 AFL season: despite West Coast Eagles players being depicted on the game's cover, the Western Australian team in the game was known as Perth.

In addition, three fictional teams - based in Darwin, Canberra, and Hobart - were playable in the game.
