= AFL Live =

2011 video game

- Game cover
- Developer: Big Ant Studios
- Publisher: Tru Blu Entertainment
- Series: AFL
- Engine: PhyreEngine
- Platforms: Microsoft Windows, PlayStation 3, Xbox 360
- Release: 21 April 2011: PlayStation 3, Xbox 360; AU: 21 April 2011 Game of the Year Edition Microsoft Windows, PlayStation 3, Xbox 360; AU: 6 June 2012
- Genre: Sports
- Modes: Single-player, multiplayer

AFL Live is a sports game in the AFL series of Australian rules football video games. It was developed by Big Ant Studios for PlayStation 3, Xbox 360 and Microsoft Windows. It was released on 21 April 2011. The Game of the Year Edition was released for The PlayStation Network and Xbox Live Marketplace on 6 June 2012 and was released for optical disc on 12 July 2012. Commentary is provided by Dennis Cometti and Brian Taylor.

== Gameplay ==
The gameplay has gone more in-depth with the core mechanics. Some specific improvements include, faster ball movement and a more free flowing game, improved control and camera systems, and more scope for tactical adjustments. The possible addition of obscurities such as "behind the play" incidents will potentially add to the longevity of the gameplay experience.

All officially licensed AFL teams are included in the game. While it also features three extra teams, Victoria, Indigenous All Stars and an All Stars Team (Dream team) from the AFL Hall of Fame Tribute Match.

== Features ==
- Single Match:

An exhibition match, can be played competitively or cooperatively.

- Toyota AFL Premiership Season:

Select a number of teams through the AFL season.

- NAB Cup:

Select a number of teams through the NAB Cup.

- Custom Season:

Create and play with a personalised team, from the Footy Factory, or compete in a straight knockout tournament.

- Custom Finals:

Select 8 teams to play in the AFL finals series.

- Training Mode:

Training mode includes tutorials on the controls of the game.

- Footy Factory:

The "Footy Factory" allows the player to create their own football player or team. A custom team will start with a 6.5 million dollar salary cap. To offer better balancing for online play, created teams can be used online. The online component offers ranked matches and a detailed XP system, that rewards players for good performance in-game.

== Online ==
The game features online play, with Big Ant Studios stating that it uses the PlayStation Network, Xbox Live and Games for Windows – Live to their full advantage. Up to 4 players with Xbox Live, 7 with PSN, are able to play either cooperatively or competitively online. Online play features a full-fledged XP System where players rank up and collect badges for achieving set tasks.

== Stadiums ==
The game licensed all 17 teams and 12 stadiums from the 2011 AFL season. Stadiums were AAMI Stadium, West Lakes The Gabba, Brisbane Etihad Stadium, Melbourne MCG, Melbourne Patersons Stadium, Perth Skilled Stadium, Geelong Gold Coast Stadium, Gold Coast Manuka Oval, Canberra Aurora Stadium, Launceston TIO Stadium, Darwin SCG, Sydney ANZ Stadium, Sydney The Game of the Year Edition licensed all 18 teams and 13 stadiums from the 2012 AFL season.

== Game of the Year Edition ==
The Game of the Year Edition is an update DLC for the 2012 AFL season, with updated team lists and on-field uniforms for the 2012 season, Skoda Stadium is to be usable and the ability to play in The Toyota AFL Premiership Season mode as The Greater Western Sydney Giants. It was made available on The PlayStation Network for PlayStation 3 and Xbox Live Marketplace for both Xbox 360 and Microsoft Windows on 6 June 2012 and was released for video game retailers on 12 July 2012.

== Reception ==
Reception

Review scores
Publication	Score
GameSpot	6.5/10
IGN	6/10
MMGN	6.5/10
Game Arena	4/10

AFL Live has received mostly average reviews, with a 64% aggregate rating on GameRankings.

IGN rated it 6 out of 10. MMGN and also GameSpot rating it 6.5/10, with MMGN summing up, "The best AFL game to date, and while full of issues, a positive start". The Good Game talk show's two reviewers gave the game a 6/10 and 6.5/10. While Game Arena gave it a lower score of 4/10.
