= List of cricket video games =

The following is a list of cricket video games.

Game	Developer(s)	Year of release	Platforms	Ref.
Cricket League APK	Miniclip	2021	PlayStation 4, Xbox One, Windows, Steam	
Ashes Cricket	Big Ant Studios	2017	PlayStation 4, Xbox One, Windows, Steam	
Ashes Cricket 2009	Transmission Games	2009	PlayStation 3, Wii, Windows, Xbox 360	
Ashes Cricket 2013	Trickstar Games	2013	Windows	
Battle for the Ashes	Audiogenic	1995	MS-DOS, Amiga	
Big Bash Boom	Big Ant Studios	2018	PlayStation 4, Xbox One, Windows, Nintendo Switch	
Brian Lara 2007 Pressure Play	Acheron Design, IR Gurus	2007	PlayStation Portable	
Brian Lara Cricket	Audiogenic	1994	MS-DOS (1994), Mega Drive (1995), Amiga (1995)	
Brian Lara Cricket '96 •Shane Warne Cricket^{AU}	Audiogenic	1996	Mega Drive, Windows, Amiga	
Brian Lara Cricket •Shane Warne Cricket^{AU, NZ}	Codemasters	1998	PlayStation, Windows	
Brian Lara International Cricket 2005 •Ricky Ponting International Cricket 2005^{AU}	Swordfish Studios	2005	Windows, PlayStation 2, Xbox	
Brian Lara International Cricket 2007 •Ricky Ponting International Cricket 2007^{AU} •Yuvraj Singh International Cricket 2007^{IN}	Codemasters	2007	Windows, PlayStation 2, Xbox 360	
County Cricket	Chaz Chapman	1989	Commodore 64	
Cricket 64	Ken Smith	1984	Commodore 64	
Cricket 96	Beam Software	1996	MS-DOS	
Cricket 97	Beam Software	1997	MS-DOS, Windows	
Cricket 07	EA Canada, HB Studios	2006	Windows, PlayStation 2	
iB Cricket	ProYuga Advanced Technologies	2018	Steam, Meta Store	
Cricket 19	Big Ant Studios	2019	PlayStation 4, Xbox One, Windows, Nintendo Switch, Steam	
Cricket 22	Big Ant Studios	2021	PlayStation 4, PlayStation 5, Xbox One, Xbox Series, Windows, Nintendo Switch, Steam	
Cricket 24	Big Ant Studios	2023	PlayStation 4, PlayStation 5, Xbox One, Xbox Series, Windows, Nintendo Switch, Steam	
Cricket 2000	Krisalis Software	2000	Windows, PlayStation	
Cricket 2002	HB Studios	2002	Windows, PlayStation 2	
Cricket 2004	HB Studios	2004	Windows, PlayStation 2	
Cricket 2005	EA Canada, HB Studios	2005	Windows, PlayStation 2, Xbox	
Cricket Captain	The Majestic 12	1989	Amiga, Atari ST, Commodore 64, ZX Spectrum	
Cricket Captain	PAL Developments, Steel City Software Engineers	1990	Amstrad CPC, Commodore 64, ZX Spectrum	
Cricket Captain 2014	Childish Things	2014	Windows, Steam	
Cricket Captain 2015	Childish Things	2015	Windows, Steam	
Cricket Captain 2016	Childish Things	2016	Windows, Steam, Mac , iOS	
Cricket Captain 2017	Childish Things	2017	Windows, Steam, Mac, iOS	
Cricket Captain 2018	Childish Things	2018	Windows, Steam, Android	
Cricket Captain 2019	Childish Things	2019	Windows, Steam, iOS, Android	
Cricket Captain 2020	Childish Things	2020	Windows, Steam, iOS, Android	
Cricket Captain 2021	Childish Things	2021	Windows, Steam, iOS, Android	
Cricket Challenge	Gameshastra	2011	WiiWare	
Cricket Coach 2007	Midas Interactive Entertainment	2007	Windows	
Cricket Revolution	Mindstorm Studios	2009	Windows, Steam	
Don Bradman Cricket 14	Big Ant Studios	2014	Windows, PlayStation 3, Xbox 360, PlayStation 4, Xbox One, Steam	
Don Bradman Cricket 17	Big Ant Studios	2016	Windows, PlayStation 4, Xbox One, Steam	
Freddie Flintoff's Power Play Cricket •Shane Watson's Power Play Cricket^{AU}	Fuzzy Frog Games	2010	Nintendo DS	
Graham Gooch World Class Cricket •Allan Border's Cricket^{AU} •Jonty Rhodes Cricket^{SA}	Audiogenic	1993	Amiga, Atari ST, Commodore 64, IBM PC	
Graham Gooch's All Star Cricket	Audiogenic	1987	Commodore 64, Commodore 128	
Graham Gooch's Test Cricket	Audiogenic	1985	Acorn Electron, BBC Micro, Commodore 64, Amstrad CPC, Amstrad PCW, ZX Spectrum	
Howzat!	Alternative Software	1984	ZX Spectrum	
Ian Botham's Cricket	Gamart	1992	Amiga, MS-DOS	
Ian Botham's Test Match •Arne Armchairs Howzat Cricket Game^{AU}	Tynesoft	1984	Acorn Electron, Amstrad CPC, BBC Micro, Commodore 16, Plus/4, Commodore 64, ZX Spectrum	
ICC Cricket World Cup England 99	Creative Assembly	1999	Windows	
International Cricket	Beam Software	1992	NES	
International Cricket 2010	Trickstar Games	2010	PlayStation 3, Xbox 360	
International Cricket Captain 2006	Empire Interactive	2006	Windows	
International Cricket Captain •Australian Cricket Captain^{AU}	Empire Interactive	1998	Windows	
International Cricket Captain 2	Empire Interactive	1999	Windows	
International Cricket Captain 2000	Empire Interactive	2000	Windows, PlayStation	
International Cricket Captain 2001 Ashes Edition	Empire Interactive	2001	Windows, PlayStation	
International Cricket Captain 2002	Empire Interactive	2002	Windows, PlayStation	
International Cricket Captain Ashes Year 2005	Empire Interactive	2005	Windows	
International Cricket Captain 2006	Empire Interactive	2006	Windows	
International Cricket Captain Ashes Edition 2006	Empire Interactive	2006	Windows	
International Cricket Captain III	Empire Interactive	2007	Windows, PlayStation 2, PlayStation Portable	
International Cricket Captain 2008	Empire Interactive	2008	Windows	
International Cricket Captain 2009	Childish Things	2009	Windows	
International Cricket Captain 2009 Ashes Edition	Childish Things	2009	Windows	
International Cricket Captain 2010	Childish Things	2010	Windows	
International Cricket Captain 2011	Childish Things	2011	Windows, Mac	
International Cricket Captain 2012	Childish Things	2012	Windows, Mac	
International Cricket Captain 2013	Childish Things	2013	Windows, Mac	
Marcus Trescothick's Cricket Coach	Rockingham Software	2006	Windows	
Michael Vaughan's Championship Cricket Manager	Midas Interactive Entertainment	2001	Windows	
Move Street Cricket	Trine Games	2012	PlayStation 3	
Move Street Cricket 2	Trine Games	2013	PlayStation 3	
Robin Smith's International Cricket	Challenge Software	1990	Amiga, Atari ST, Commodore 64, ZX Spectrum	
Street Cricket Champions	Trine Games	2010	PlayStation 2, PlayStation Portable	
Street Cricket Champions 2	Trine Games	2012	PlayStation 2, PlayStation Portable	
Super International Cricket	Beam Software	1994	SNES	
TableTop Cricket	Big Ant Studios	2015	PlayStation 3, PlayStation 4, Xbox One, Windows, Steam	
World Cricket	Zeppelin Games Limited	1991	Amiga, Atari ST, Commodore 64, MS-DOS, ZX Spectrum	
WCC 2	Nextwave Multimedia	2015	Android, iOS, Windows	
WCC 3	Nextwave Multimedia	2020	Android, iOS, Windows	
MetaShot Smart Cricket	MetaShot	2024	Android, iOS, Windows, Mac	
