= Cricket 26 =

2025 cricket video game

- Developer: Big Ant Studios
- Publisher: Nacon
- Series: Cricket Series
- Engine: In-House Engine
- Platforms: Microsoft Windows; PlayStation 4 PlayStation 5 Xbox One; Xbox Series X/S
- Release: 19 November 2025
- Genre: Sports game
- Modes: Single-player, Multiplayer

Reception

Aggregate score
Aggregator	Score
Metacritic	64/100

Review score
Publication	Score
IGN	6/10

Cricket 26 is a 2025 cricket video game developed by Australian developer Big Ant Studios and published by French publisher Nacon. It was released on 19 November 2025, and is the official video game of the 2025-26 Ashes series. It is the ninth game in Big Ant Studio's series of cricket games, being the sequel to Cricket 24.

Available on Windows, PlayStation 4, PlayStation 5, Xbox One, Xbox Series X/S and Jio Games (Cloud Gaming).

== Development ==
Cricket 26 is based on an updated version of the same engine that powered Cricket 24. It features graphical enhancements like ray-traced lighting, dynamic weather effects, realistic bowling actions, and updated fielding animations. Batting, bowling, and fielding mechanics have been tweaked.

== Gameplay ==
Cricket 26 features enhanced gameplay mechanics similar to those present in previous editions in the series. Multiplayer features like Pro Team, Auction House, academy, and content drops are also present. Certain Pro Team features require microtransactions. Players have the ability to create and acquire community-generated content like stadiums, equipment, and players. A new gameplay mode is Management Career, which lets the player take charge of teambuilding activities like recruitment, player development, lineup construction, and match strategy. Team confidence meters and optional objectives have also been introduced.

The game includes both domestic and international cricket, with Ireland, the West Indies, and Pakistan being newly added teams. Domestic competitions include the Indian Premier League, The Hundred, and the Caribbean Premier League. In addition, It includes an enhanced mode focusing on the Ashes which allows the player to take charge of activities like net sessions and press conferences for either England or Australia. New Zealand's Super Smash league has been removed. Games can now be affected by environmental conditions like light and precipitation, and the Duckworth–Lewis–Stern method can come into play.

== Release ==
Cricket 26 was released worldwide on 19 November 2025 on Windows, PlayStation 4, PlayStation 5, Xbox One, Xbox Series X/S and Jio Games (Cloud Gaming). The Windows version is digital-only and is available on both the Xbox Store and Steam. The PlayStation and Xbox Series X/S versions are available both digitally and on physical discs. The Xbox One version is digital-only and is available in the Xbox store.

Aside from the Standard edition, a Pro Team edition includes additional credits for use in microtransactions. English is the only supported language.

== Teams & competitions ==
Cricket 26 game features a combination of international teams, domestic sides and licensed franchise competitions. It's major licensed tournaments include The Ashes, the Big Bash League (BBL), Women's Big Bash League (WBBL), The Hundred, the Indian Premier League (IPL), the Caribbean Premier League (CPL) and the Pakistan Super League (PSL). The game also includes dedicated Ashes mode featuring the full England and Australia squads, team practice sessions and pre-match press conferences.

The game also offers domestic team structures from several cricket-playing nations. It also includes several licensed teams (International) with several licensed players (with accurate and real faces and bowling actions), and jersey.

The game licensing varies between competitions and national teams, for example, the IPL features authentic franchise branding and player roster, latest uniforms and teams home stadium with franchise branding, which makes this game more interesting to match the real matches vibes.

=== National Teams (Licensed & Non Licensed) ===
- Afghanistan
- Australia (licensed)
- Bangladesh
- Bermuda
- Canada
- Denmark
- England (licensed)
- Germany (licensed)
- Hong Kong
- India
- Ireland (licensed)
- Italy (licensed)
- Jersey
- Kenya
- Kuwait (licensed)
- Malaysia
- Namibia
- Nepal
- Netherlands
- New Zealand (licensed)
- Oman (licensed)
- Pakistan (licensed)
- Papua New Guinea
- Qatar
- Scotland (licensed)
- Singapore
- South Africa
- Sri Lanka
- Thailand (licensed)
- Uganda
- United Arab Emirates
- United States
- Vanuatu
- West Indies (licensed)
- Zimbabwe

=== Tournaments & Leagues ===
Tournament / League	Status	Notes
The Ashes	Fully Licensed	Includes dedicated net sessions, press conferences, and full England and Australia squads.
Australian States	Fully Licensed	Includes all official 6 teams and authentic venues.
Big Bash League (BBL)	Fully Licensed	Includes all official 8 teams and authentic venues.
English Counties	Non Licensed	featuring all 18 teams
The Hundred	Fully Licensed	Full integration of the short-format tournament with all men's and women's teams.
Bangladesh Domestic	Non Licensed	featuring 7 divisions teams
India Domestic	Non Licensed	featuring all 38 teams
Indian Premier League (IPL)	Partially Licensed	Features 9 out of 10 official teams with authentic branding (excluding Royal Challengers Bengaluru), while missing some player squads at launch.
New Zealand Domestic	Non Licensed	featuring all 6 teams
Pakistan Domestic	Non Licensed	featuring 6 teams
Pakistan Super League (PSL)	Fully Licensed	featuring all 6 official teams and authentic venues
South Africa Domestic	Non Licensed	featuring 8 teams
SA20	Not Licensed	Includes all 8 teams
Sri Lanka domestic	Not Licensed	featuring all 5 district teams
West Indies domestic	Not Licensed	featuring all 6 teams
Caribbean Premier League (CPL)	Fully Licensed	Includes official West Indies domestic T20 teams and authentic venues.

== Reception ==
Critics praised the graphics, game mechanics, improved AI, and on-field gameplay of Cricket 26, saying that it is an iterative but significant improvement over Cricket 24. However, they noted the presence of frequent crashes and graphical bugs even after several patches in the first week after release. The new game modes were criticised, and some features were entirely non-functional at release. User reviews on Steam are mostly positive.

== System requirements ==
Hardware	Minimum requirements	Recommended specs
OS	Windows 10 or Windows 11 (64-bit)	Windows 10 or Windows 11 (64-bit)
Processor	Intel Core i5-6600K @ 3.5 GHz / AMD Ryzen 5 1600X @ 3.6 GHz	Intel Core i7-11700K / AMD Ryzen 7 3700X
Memory	8 GB RAM	16 GB RAM
Graphics	NVIDIA GeForce GTX 1660 Ti (6 GB) / AMD Radeon RX 5700XT (8 GB)	NVIDIA GeForce RTX 3070 (8 GB) / AMD Radeon RX 6800 XT
DirectX	Version 12	Version 12
Storage	80 GB available space (SSD recommended)	80 GB available space (SSD recommended)
