= Tiebreak: Official Game of the ATP and WTA =

Tiebreak: Official game of the ATP and WTA
- Standard edition cover art featuring Novak Djokovic and Coco Gauff
- Developer: Big Ant Studios
- Publisher: Nacon
- Platforms: Microsoft Windows; PlayStation 4 PlayStation 5 Xbox One; Xbox Series X/S
- Release: 22 August 2024
- Genre: Sports
- Modes: Single-player, multiplayer

Tiebreak: Official game of the ATP and WTA is a tennis video game, developed by Big Ant Studios and published by Nacon. It was released on August 22, 2024. The finalized cover features Novak Djokovic and Coco Gauff.

== Development ==
The game was developed by Big Ant Studios and published by Nacon. Big Ant Studios had previously developed the AO Tennis video games, along with Tennis World Tour 2. The game was released in early access in January 2024.

== Gameplay ==
Gameplay features a career mode with 90 official tournaments to choose from, a "Novak Djokovic Slam Challenge", and a creator mode that allows players to design their own tennis courts and stadiums.

== Roster ==
The Tiebreak: Official game of the ATP and WTA roster consists of 160 players to choose from, including Jannik Sinner, Carlos Alcaraz, Novak Djokovic, Roger Federer, Rafael Nadal, Taylor Fritz, Daniil Medvedev, Andy Murray, Ben Shelton, Coco Gauff, Naomi Osaka, Jasmine Paolini, Aryna Sabalenka, Maria Sharapova, Iga Swiatek and many others listed below.

Tiebreak: Official game of the ATP and WTA Roster
ATP	WTA
Carlos Alcaraz	Destanee Aiava
Kevin Anderson	Ekaterina Alexandrova
Felix Auger-Aliassime	Bianca Andreescu
Don Battee	Mirra Andreeva
Roberto Bautista Agut	Amanda Anisimova
Tomas Berdych	Victoria Azarenka
Zizou Begrs	Paula Badosa
Matteo Berrettini	Irina-Camelia Begu
Nuno Borges	Belinda Bencic
Fransisco Cerundolo	Kimberly Birrell
Marin Cilic	Eugenie Bouchard
Federico Coria	Katie Boulter
Borna Coric	Maria Loudres Carle
Taro Daniel	Elisabetta Cocciaretto
Alex de Minaur	Danielle Collins
Juan Martin del Potro	Jaqueline Cristian
Grigor Dimitrov	Olga Danilovic
Novak Djokovic	Lauren Davis
Jack Draper	Leylah Fernandez
Mathew Ebden	Linda Fruhvirtova
Kyle Edmund	Olivia Gadecki
Tomas Martin Etcheverry	Caroline Garcia
Christopher Eubanks	Coco Gauff
Daniel Evans	Beatriz Haddad Maia
Roger Federer	Malene Helgo
Fabio Fognini	Storm Hunter
Taylor Fritz	Leolia Jeanjean
David Goffin	Anna Kalinskaya
Tallon Griekspoor	Daria Kasatkina
Rinky Hijikata	Sofia Kenin
Ugo Humbert	Angelique Kerber
Hubert Hurkacz	Madison Keys
John Isner	Anett Kontaveit
Nicolas Jarry	Marta Kostyuk
Miomir Kecmanovic	Barbora Krejcikova
Karen Khachanov	Veronika Kudermetova
Dominik Koepfer	Petra Kvitova
Thanasi Kokkinakis	Caty McNally
Sebastian Korda	Elise Mertens
Jason Kubler	Kristina Mladenovic
Nick Kyrgios	Karolina Muchova
Jiri Lehecka	Celine Naef
Elliot Loney	Emma Navarro
Mackenzie McDonald	Naomi Osaka
Daniil Medvedev	Jelena Ostapenko
Jakub Mensik	Jasmine Paolini
Alex Michelsen	Diana Parry
Michael Mmoh	Anastasia Pavlyuchenkova
Gael Monfils	Jessica Pegula
Giovanni Mpetshi Perricard	Bernarda Pera
Andy Murray	Karolina Pliskova
Lorenzo Musetti	Yulia Putinseva
Rafael Nadal	Emma Raducanu
Mariano Navone	Shelby Rogers
Kei Nishikori	Aryna Sabalenka
Yoshihito Nishioka	Maria Sakkari
Cameron Norrie	Liudmila Samsonova
Christopher O'Connell	Daria Saville
Reilly Opelka	Maria Sharapova
Benoit Paire	Diana Shnaider
Tommy Paul	Katerina Siniakova
Alexei Popyrin	Sloane Stephens
Max Purcell	Elina Svitolina
Sam Querrey	Iga Swiatek
Milos Raonic	Ajla Tomljanovic
Arthur Rinderknech	Donna Vekic
Andrey Rublev	Katie Volynets
Holger Rune	Marketa Vondrousova
Casper Ruud	Xinyu Wang
Diego Schwartzman	Xiyu Wang
Thiago Seyboth Wild	Caroline Wozniacki
Denis Shapovalov	Shuai Zhang
Ben Shelton	Qinwen Zheng
Jannik Sinner	
Jan-Lennard Struff	
Dominic Thiem	
Jordan Thompson	
Frances Tiafoe	
Stefanos Tsitsipas	
Jo-Wilfried Tsonga	
Camilo Ugo Carabelli	
Luca Van Assche	
Alexsander Vukic	
Stan Wawrinka	
J.J. Wolf	
Yibing Wu	
Alexander Zverev	

== Reception ==
According to the review aggregation website Metacritic, the game has received mixed or average reviews, based on 10 critics. Fellow review aggregator OpenCritic assessed that the game received fair approval, being recommended by 13% of critics.
