= List of Kolkata Knight Riders cricketers =

The following is a list of cricketers from the Kolkata Knight Riders. It includes players to have featured for the team in one or more matches across IPL and CLT20.

== Key ==
General

- § – Member of the current squad
- † – Captain
- ‡ – Wicket-keeper
- First – Year of Twenty20 debut for KKR
- Last – Year of latest Twenty20 match for KKR
- Mat – Number of matches played

Fielding

- Ca – Catches taken
- St – Stumpings effected

Batting

- Inn – Number of innings batted
- NO – Number of innings not out
- Runs – Runs scored in career
- HS – Highest score
- 100 – Centuries scored
- 50 – Half-centuries scored (Note: A century made is not listed as an additional half century.)
- Avg – Runs scored per dismissal
- * – Batsman remained not out

Bowling

- Balls – Balls bowled in career (Note: This does not include illegal deliveries like no-balls and wides.)
- Wkt – Wickets taken in career
- BBI – Best bowling in an innings (Note: The BBI has not been provided for those bowlers who have not taken any wicket while playing for RR.)
- ER - Average number of runs conceded per over (Note: Average runs concede by bowlers while playing for RR.)
- Ave – Average runs per wicket
- SR - Batsman scoring rate

Captains

- Won – Number of games won
- Lost – Number of games lost
- NR – Number of games with no result
- Win% – Percentage of games won to those captained (Note: The Win–loss percentage is calculated using the formula: $\frac{Wins+\frac{1}{2}Ties}{Games}$)

== Players ==
RR cricketers
General					Batting								Bowling					Fielding	
Name	Nationality (Note: The information in the nationality column is according to ESPNcricinfo. This information may not necessarily reflect the player's birthplace or citizenship.)	First	Last	Mat	Inn	NO	Runs	HS	100	50	Avg	SR	Balls	Wkt	BBI	ER	Ave	Ca	St
Sourav Ganguly †	India	2008	2010	40	38	2	1031	91	0	7	28.64	110.50	216	8	2/21	7.44	33.50	15	0
Aakash Chopra	India	2008	2009	7	6	0	53	24	0	0	8.83	74.65	0	–	–	–	–	2	0
Debabrata Das	India	2008	2013	33	23	9	347	43*	0	0	24.78	123.92	0	–	–	–	–	7	0
Brad Hodge	Australia	2008	2010	19	19	3	476	73	0	4	29.75	114.15	150	9	3/29	8.08	22.44	6	0
Brendon McCullum † ‡	New Zealand	2008	2013	39	38	3	958	158*	1	4	27.37	121.57	0	–	–	–	–	20	6

== Captains ==
Last Updated on 19 July 2020

KKR captains
No.	Name	First	Last	Mat	Won	Lost	Tie	NR	Win%
1	Sourav Ganguly	2008	2010	27	13	14	0	0	48.14
2	Brendon McCullum	2009	2009	13	3	9	1	0	26.92
3	Gautam Gambhir	2011	2017	108	61	46	1	0	56.48
4	Dinesh Karthik	2018	2020	37	19	17	1	0	51.35
5	Eoin Morgan	2020	2021	24	11	12	1	0	45.83

Source: Cricinfo
