= Aakash Chopra =

Indian retired cricketer (born 1977)

Personal information
- Born: 19 September 1977 (age 49); Agra, Uttar Pradesh, India
- Batting: Right-handed
- Bowling: Right-arm medium Right-arm off break
- Role: Batsman

International information
- National side: India (2003–2004)
- Test debut (cap 246): 8 October 2003 v New Zealand
- Last Test: 26 October 2004 v Australia

Domestic team information
- Years: Team
- 1997-2009/10: Delhi
- 2010-2011/12: Rajasthan
- 2012/13: Himachal Pradesh
- 2008–2009: Kolkata Knight Riders

Career statistics
Competition	Test	FC	LA	T20
Matches	10	162	65	21
Runs scored	437	10,839	2,415	334
Batting average	23.00	45.35	44.72	18.55
100s/50s	0/2	29/53	7/17	0/1
Top score	60	301*	130*	72*
Balls bowled	–	546	84	0
Wickets	–	6	1	0
Bowling average	–	53.33	58.00	–
5 wickets in innings	–	0	0	0
10 wickets in match	–	0	0	0
Best bowling	–	2/5	1/17	–
Catches/stumpings	25/–	189/–	29/–	4/–
- Source: ESPNcricinfo, 1 July 2020

YouTube information
- Channel: Aakash Chopra
- Years active: 2011–present
- Genres: Cricket Analysis, Updates, News
- Subscribers: 5.04 million
- Views: 1.38 billion
- Last updated: 22 June 2025

Aakash Chopra (born 19 September 1977) is a cricket commentator, YouTuber and former cricketer who briefly played for the Indian cricket team from late 2003 to late 2004.

Chopra currently works as a Hindi cricket commentator for JioStar. He previously worked as a column writer for ESPNcricinfo.

His international cricket career consisted of 10 test matches, in which he scored 437 runs at an average of 23 runs per inning.

In Indian domestic cricket, Chopra played for the Delhi cricket team, Himachal Pradesh cricket team and Rajasthan cricket team. He also played for the Kolkata Knight Riders in the Indian Premier League.

== Cricket career ==
=== International ===
Chopra made his Test debut in Ahmedabad against New Zealand in late 2003, as India sought to find an opening partner for his Delhi teammate Virender Sehwag. During the 2003–2004 second Test in Mohali, Chopra scored two half-centuries against New Zealand. On the 2003–04 tour to Australia, he frequently partnered with Virender Sehwag, including two century opening partnerships in Melbourne and Sydney. As an opening batsman, Chopra was credited with the large scores that India accumulated in that series, surpassing middle-order batsmen Rahul Dravid, V. V. S. Laxman, Sachin Tendulkar and Sourav Ganguly who regularly scored centuries.

On the subsequent tour to Pakistan, Chopra scored 42 runs in the first test match wherein Virender Sehwag scored the First ever triple century for an Indian and India scored more than 600 runs in the first innings. India went on to defeat Pakistan in the first Test in Multan. However, in the second Test, the Indian batsmen scored much lower, apart from a century from Yuvraj Singh, who played in place of the injured captain Sourav Ganguly. When Ganguly returned for the final Test, Chopra was axed and Yuvraj was retained in the team.

Chopra was reintroduced as Sehwag's partner in the 2004 Border–Gavaskar Trophy after Tendulkar was injured for the First Test in Bangalore. A heavy loss saw Chopra axed for the following match in Chennai upon Tendulkar's return, with Yuvraj playing as opening batsman. Yuvraj also struggled, and Chopra was recalled for the Third Test in Nagpur. Australia won this series, the first test win in India for them in 35 years, and this resulted in Chopra being dropped from the team. Chopra was replaced by Delhi teammates Gautam Gambhir and Wasim Jaffer, who went on to partner Sehwag in Test matches. Due to his low scoring rate, Chopra was not considered for One Day Internationals.

=== Domestic ===
In September 2008, Aakash played for Delhi in the Nissar Trophy against SNGPL (the winners of the Quaid-i-Azam Trophy from Pakistan). Delhi scored 4 and 197, making the match a draw, but SNGPL won the trophy based on first-innings lead. After representing Delhi for a long time, Chopra joined Rajasthan as a guest player in the Ranji Plate division. Chopra helped Rajasthan to become the first Plate division team to win the Ranji Trophy, followed by another Ranji trophy win in 2010–2011 season. Chopra has won three Ranji titles in total, one with Delhi and two with Rajasthan.

=== IPL ===
Chopra played for the Kolkata Knight Riders in IPL 2008, IPL 2009, but was dropped eventually as he was deemed too slow at scoring for fast-paced T-20 cricket. In those two seasons he scored 53 runs with an average of 8.83 runs across 6 innings.

In IPL 2011, Chopra was signed by the Rajasthan Royals. In 2015, he announced his retirement from all forms of cricket. Chopra is one of the few Indian cricketers who have scored over 8,000 First-Class runs.

== Cricket commentary career ==
Chopra was a cricket commentator for Star Sports for a long time. His cricket commentary style has been described as similar to Navjot Singh Sidhu, in that he uses lots of one-liners and rhymes.

During the 2018–19 Australia vs India test series, Chopra was a commentator for 7 Network, and also commentated for Sony Ten 2.

In January 2023, Chopra left Star Sports, and joined Viacom 18 network. He voiced Hindi commentary on Sports 18 and on the Jio Cinema app during the South African Twenty20 league, SA20.

In July–August 2024, Chopra served as a Hindi commentator for the Sri Lanka vs India ODI series on Sony Sports Network. Following the merger of Viacom18 and Star India, he returned to Star Sports and was part of the Hindi commentary panel for the 2025 ICC Champions Trophy.

Aakash Chopra – Commentary career
Years	Platform/Channel	Role	Notes
2013–2022	Star Sports	Commentator	Prominent Hindi commentator during IPL and international matches.
2018	Seven Network	Commentator	English commentator during Australia vs India 2018
2023–2025	JioCinema	Commentator	Hindi commentator during IPL,WPL,SA20 and international matches.
2025–present	Star Sports	Commentator	

== Other media ==
Chopra's columns regularly appear in Mid-Day and on ESPNcricinfo.

In 2009, Chopra released Beyond the Blues: A First-Class Season Like No Other, a diary of his domestic season in 2007–2008 published by HarperCollins. It received critical acclaim, and Suresh Menon of ESPNcricinfo wrote that it was "the best book written by an Indian Test cricketer". In November 2011, his second book was published by HarperCollins, and was titled Out of the Blue, about Rajasthan's victory in the Ranji Trophy. He went on to write two more books; The Insider with ESPNcricinfo in 2015 and Numbers Do Lie with Impact Index in 2017.

In May 2020, Chopra signed as a commentator with popular mobile cricket game World Cricket Championship commentate the upcoming WCC3 game. Chopra was the first commentator to become a commentator on a digital game platform.

Aakash Chopra has a YouTube channel where he uploads match reviews and previews.
