= Video games in Pakistan =

The video game industry in Pakistan has been described as a "rapidly emerging sector with the potential to contribute significantly to the country’s economy" by a Centre for Aerospace & Security Studies report. The sector's growth has been attributed to a growing young population and increasing Internet penetration and smartphone usage.

== Video game development ==
Much of Pakistan's video game industry is involved in conducting outsourced development work, particularly focused on mobile games in hypercasual or casual genres. Most mobile game developers are based in Lahore, with several in Karachi and Islamabad. In 2024, over 1,000 mobile games were published in Pakistan, making it the second-largest mobile game developer among emerging markets behind Vietnam. However, between 2020 and 2024 the number of mobile games released annually decreased by 60%, with a similar decline in the number of mobile game developers.

Recently online game development has grown rapidly, making $50 million in revenue in 2023 with a growth rate of 30 to 50 percent year over year, according to entertainment company CEO Imran Azhar. Between 2017 and 2021, online gaming revenue tripled from $7.9 million to $25 million.

=== History ===
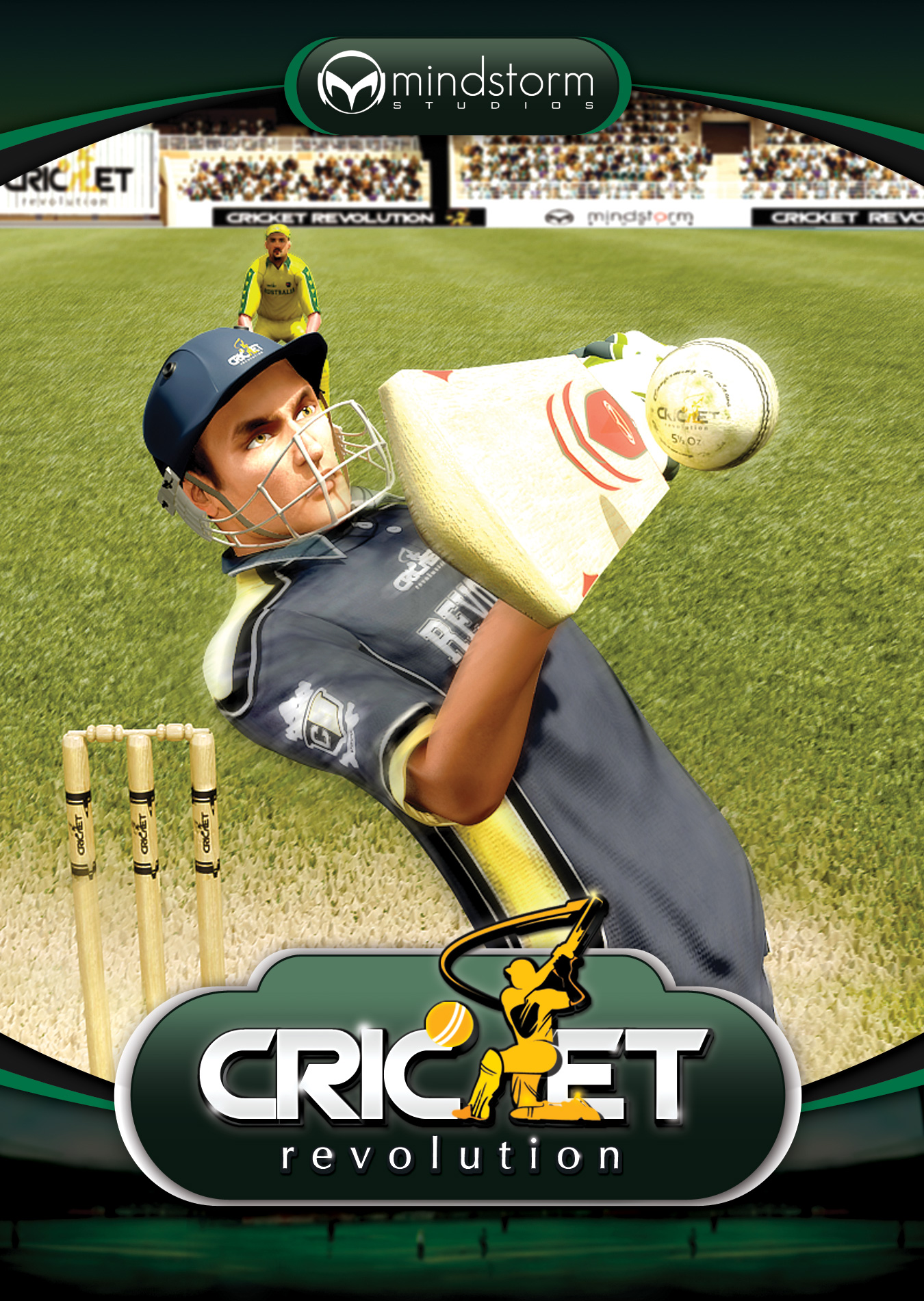
Cricket Revolution was the first game by Pakistani developers to be released on the games platform Steam.

Developers in Pakistan began creating video games for PC and console in the 1990s or early 2000s, starting with the creation of maps or mods for LAN games like Counter-Strike and Unreal Tournament. The first Pakistani video game production houses were set up around 2005. Developer Abbas Saleem Khan said that in 2002, there were two game studios in Pakistan, employing a dozen people. In the first few years, the three major game production studios were Trango Interactive and ForkParticle in Islamabad and Wireframe Interactive in Lahore; in addition to creating their own indie projects, they produced content for large game studios outside of Pakistan. The first Pakistani mobile game was published in 2008.

The first commercially successful Pakistani video game company was Mindstorm Studios, who published Cricket Revolution (Note: Referred to by some outlets as Cricket Power) in 2009, chosen as the 2011 Cricket World Cup’s official online game. Mindstorm also created and published Whacksy Taxi, which was the number one app on Apple's App Store in over 25 countries. Subsequent releases from the company, such as Farm Break and Mafia Farm, also reached the top 10 list globally.

The studio we.R.play (Note: Also stylized as "We R Play" or "We.R.Play") was established in 2010; they had their first game, Dream Chaser, published by Chillingo, later acquired by Electronic Arts. Caramel Tech, a studio formed in 2011, worked with developers Halfbrick and Kabam to code Fruit Ninja and Jetpack Joyride. During this time, Tintash released the popular mobile game Fishing Frenzy.

The first games conference in Pakistan, Games Emerge Conference, was held in Islamabad in 2016. The Pakistan chapter of the International Game Developers Association (IGDA) was established in 2018.

=== Statistics ===
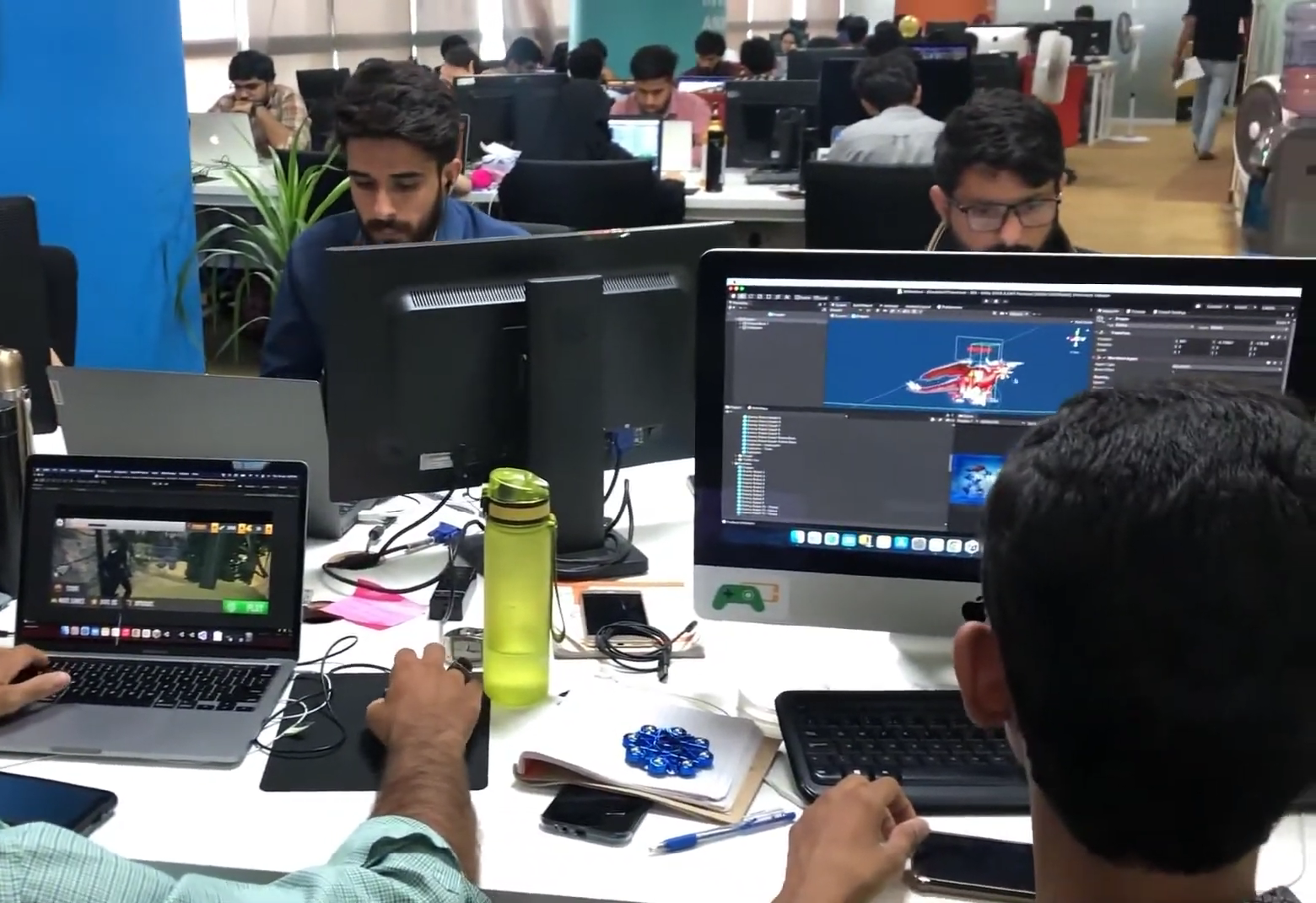
Game developers working at a studio in Lahore

As of 2023, Pakistan had 257 game development companies and 300 gaming studios, up from at least 100 in 2020, about 200 in 2021 and 240 in 2022. Notable local developers include Mindstorm Studios, Caramel Tech, and we.R.play. Other studios include Tintash, Gameview, Folio3, TkXel, GenlTeam, Mega Particle, Kwick Games, Folio3, ForkParticle, WRLD3D, Frag Gaming, Optera Digital, and Quixel.

An IGDA Pakistan survey in collaboration with PakGamers estimated there were 8,500 employees in the video game sector in Pakistan in 2019, bringing in $25 million in revenue; in 2021, the number was estimated to be between 12,000 and 15,000. Game company CEO Ali Ihsan said Pakistan had around 18,000 game developers in 2025, while an article in The Express Tribune said there were approximately 30,000 game developers in 2022.

1,100 games were published by Pakistani developers in 2023, a slight increase from the prior year following a four year decline. In 2022, the country earned over $171 million through mobile video game development. The industry in Pakistan was overall valued at US$500 million in 2024, up from $107 million in 2017 and over $300 million in 2022. In 2023, Deutsche Welle said that the sector was projected to grow by 9.77% each year until 2027.

Pakistani game developers are predominantly male; among the games and animation sector in Pakistan in 2023, 17% of employees were women. However, several major studios have taken steps to achieve gender parity; for example, studio we.R.play has a workforce which is 42% women.

=== Challenges and initiatives ===
The video game development industry in Pakistan has been repeatedly described as "emerging". The delayed growth of the field has been blamed on the inadequacy of the country's electrical and internet infrastructure, limited STEM education, and regulatory requirements. Pakistani game studios also have difficulty raising startup capital and transferring money, and mobile developers struggle with low ad impression rates.

Several organizations have launched initiatives to stimulate video game development in Pakistan. Google launched Gaming Growth Lab Pakistan in 2022, providing workshops and consultation to game studios. The company launched two similar initiatives in 2024. In 2025, the Ministry of Information Technology and Telecommunication launched the Center of Excellence in Gaming and Animation (CEGA) to support game startups and provide training opportunities. In addition, while Pakistani universities do not generally offer degrees in game design or development, there are game development courses available at the Institute for Arts and Culture, Arena Multimedia Pakistan, PixelArt Game Academy, and Habib University, with complementary courses offered at other institutions.

== Video game playing ==
Unlike in India, Pakistani gamers had access to Atari and Sega consoles before the 1990s. The first gaming arcade in Karachi was established in 1991. In the late 1990s and early 2000s, a competitive gaming subculture arose in arcades in Lahore. "Gaming zones" and Internet cafés providing cheap access to PCs and consoles also became popular. However, as personal computers decreased in price and Internet speeds increased, more people began playing at home.

COVID-19 lockdowns in 2020 caused many Pakistanis to begin playing video games such as PlayerUnknown's Battlegrounds and Free Fire; the mobile gaming industry in Pakistan increased by 35% between 2020 and 2022. By the end of 2022, approximately 16 percent of the population played video games.

A Pakistan Software Export Board report said the country had at least 34 million gamers in 2022, with the number expected to rise to 50.9 million by 2026. Marketing company CEO Naveed Asghar said there were 100 million gamers in Pakistan in 2022. In 2022, PwC analysts found that Pakistan was the second fastest growing video game market behind Turkey, with a compound annual growth rate of 24.1% expected from 2021 to 2026; in 2024, they found the country was the third fastest growing, with a CAGR of 16.0% through 2028.

As of 2022, women represented 23% of Pakistan's gaming population, with 44% of adult gamers being under age 24. The high percentage of youth in the country has been seen as a large talent pool with potential to grow the digital economy.

A majority of video gaming in Pakistan occurs on mobile phones, accounting for 52 percent of the market in 2022 and around 60 percent in 2024. Over one third of all mobile apps downloaded in 2023 in Pakistan were video games. However, due to the high price of consoles and poor Internet connectivity, many still play in arcades.

Video game piracy has historically been common in Pakistan, but became less prevalent during the 7th generation of consoles due to increased anti-piracy measures, such as digital rights management.

== Esports ==
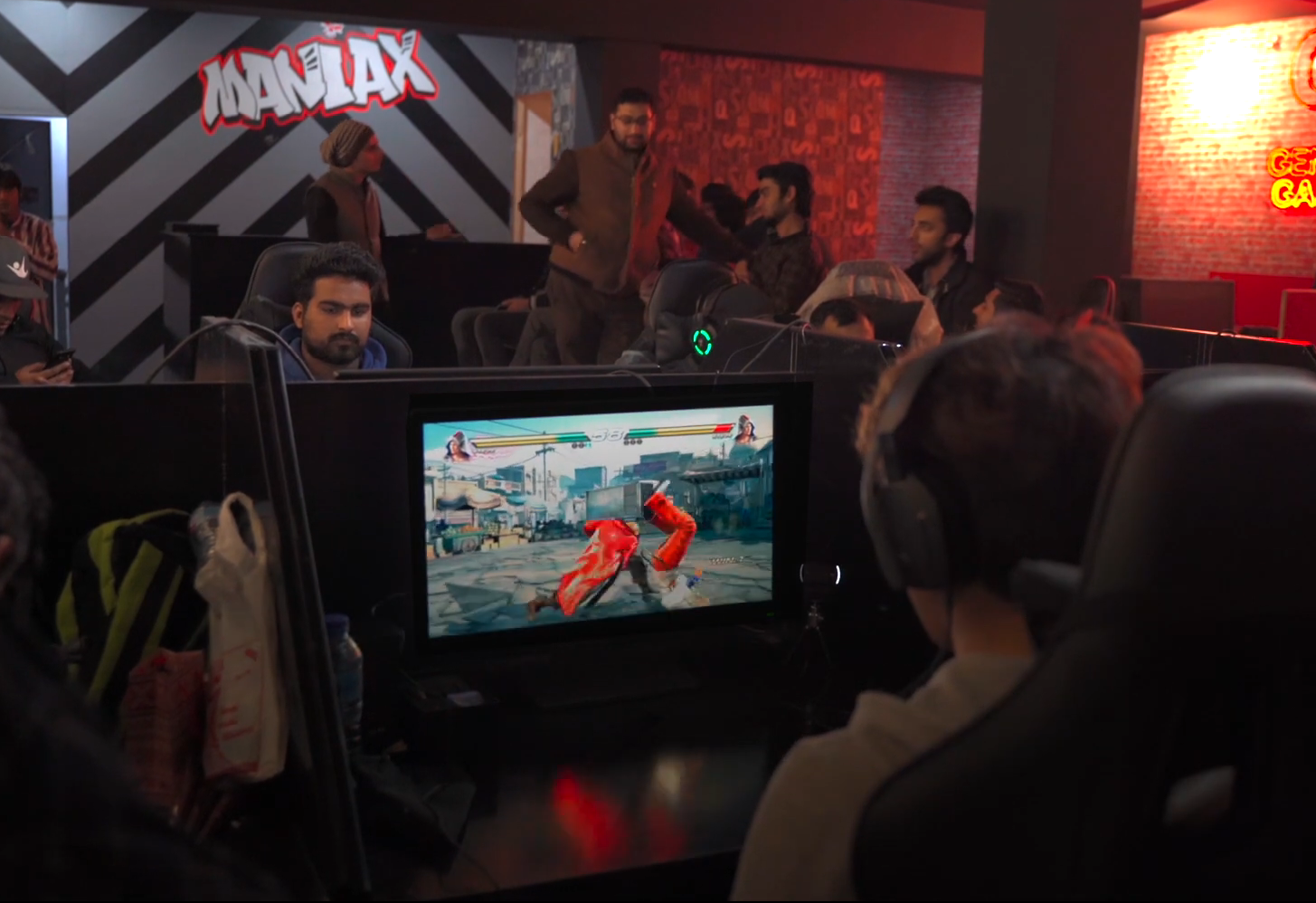
Two gamers playing Tekken 7 in the Maniax arcade in Lahore

Pakistan's esports market has experienced significant growth in the last decade. The country has a notable presence in tournaments for the fighting game series Tekken; as of 2025, three of the top ten players in the world were from Pakistan, including eight-time EVO champion Arslan Ash. The Pakistani Dota 2 player Sumail Hassan became the third highest earning professional gamer in 2017. Competitive gamers primary concentrate on the games and game series Tekken, PUBG: Battlegrounds, Free Fire, Valorant, and FC/FIFA.

Early competitions in the 2010s were held for first-person shooters like Counter-Strike. The first known company-sponsored esports event in Pakistan was held in 2009. The Federal Minister of Science and Technology said in December 2020 that the first national esports tournament would occur in March 2021. Pakistan's largest esports tournament was held in Islamabad in 2022. The first esports awards ceremony in Pakistan was presented in 2021.

The esports industry in Pakistan is primarily supported via sponsorship from large brands like Red Bull and Pepsi. In 2021, Pakistan was ranked 29 out of 150 countries for esports revenue, with 278 local players earning $4.78 million combined, rising to $5.2 million in 2024. In 2022, business director Moazzam Kamran said Pakistan was the 11th largest country in terms of esports earnings. Statista projected revenue from esports in Pakistan would reach $5.9 million in 2025, with an expected annual growth rate of 10.25%. A large portion of that funding is concentrated in Tekken.

Many gamers see esports as a source of income to supplement low salaries or mitigate unemployment. However, high taxes on gaming equipment, unreliable internet infrastructure and limited access to international payment systems make it difficult for many Pakistani gamers to receive or profit from tournament money or sponsorships; the weakness of the Pakistani passport is also a barrier to attending competitions internationally. Social attitudes against esports as a profession also play a role, as video gaming is still primarily seen as a frivolous pastime.

Starting in the late 2010s, the Pakistani federal and local governments began providing support for esports. The government of Khyber Pakhtunkhwa recognized 'e-gaming' as a sport in 2018 and organized the first esports tournament at Peshawar Sports Complex in February. In 2021, the Ministry of Information launched E-Pak, an initiative to promote esports culture among Pakistani youth, focused on the game Free Fire. They also began providing state backing for visas and tournaments. The first national inter-university esports competition, the "Free Fire Campus Championship", was held in 2022. In 2025, Pakistan announced an esports policy and plans for a national federation to support game developers and gamers.

== Game restrictions ==
The Pakistan Telecommunication Authority regulates the import, distribution, and sale of video games in Pakistan, with games requiring approval before they can be legally sold. Video game material considered against Islamic values or cultural norms is banned.

In 2013, several major Pakistani retailers banned the sale of the recently released Call of Duty: Black Ops II and Medal of Honor: Warfighter games due to their portrayal of the country as a hub for terrorism.

The Pakistani government temporarily blocked access to PUBG: Battlegrounds in July 2020 following complaints about addictiveness and reports linking it to several suicides, but the ban was declared null and void by the Islamabad High Court after less than a month. The Punjab Police sought a ban again in 2022 after a teenage boy committed familicide after playing the game.

In 2022, the country temporarily paused overseas payments for various applications, including online video games, due to depleted foreign exchange reserves.
