= Cricket 07 =

2006 video game

- European cover art featuring England's Andrew Flintoff
- Developers: EA Canada; HB Studios
- Publisher: EA Sports
- Series: Cricket
- Platforms: Windows, PlayStation 2
- Release: AU: 16 November 2006; EU: 26 November 2006
- Genre: Sports
- Modes: Single-player, multiplayer

Cricket 07 is a 2006 cricket simulation video game developed by HB Studios and EA Canada and published by EA Sports for Microsoft Windows and PlayStation 2. It was released in November 2006, with England cricketer Andrew Flintoff appearing on the European cover.

The game introduced the Century Stick batting control system and included modes based on both the 2005 and 2006–07 Ashes series. It became the final EA Sports cricket game released for home consoles and Windows. The game subsequently developed a long-running following, with an active modding community continuing to update the Windows version years after its release.

== Gameplay options ==
In-game screenshot of Cricket 07, showing an ODI match between Australia (in green) and Namibia (in blue)

Cricket 07 features a number of game types, including limited overs matches (50, 20, 10 or 5 overs), 4-day first-class matches and full-length Test matches (5 days). You may select different pitches and different weather conditions in different venues. Several international venues are available, including the Eden Gardens in India and Lord's in England. The venues vary in conditions and pitch type, and these can be changed by the player.

Expanded features of EA Sports Cricket 2007 include improved player control and easy stroke play, along with the introduction of the Ashes section. There was also an addition on commentary as Mark Nicholas joined Richie Benaud. The game gives players the option of entering different international and national contests, including full seasons and tournaments:

- World Championship: Control up to 16 international teams playing Limited Overs cricket for the World Cup trophy.
- World Series: Control three to five teams playing in a day/night tournament in venues around Australia.
- Knockout Cup: Control eight teams playing in a limited over tournament to win the Champions Trophy.
- Test Series: Choose two teams to contest a series of one to six Test matches.
- Tour: Select a team and engage in a series of Tour, One Day, and Test matches with the host nation's teams. The tours are
  - Long Australia Tour
  - Long England Tour
  - Short Australia Tour
  - Short England Tour
  - Sub-Continent Tour
  - Caribbean Tour
  - South African Tour
  - New Zealand and Zimbabwe Tour
  - One-Day Circuit Tour

=== Australian State ===
- State Season: The six state sides compete over an entire season.
- Pura Cup: Australia's four-day, two-innings tournament.
- One Day Domestic Series: Australia's 50-over One Day competition.
- KFC Twenty20 Big Bash: Australia's Twenty20 competition, where teams are divided into two pools of three.

=== English County ===
- County Season: The 18 county teams play a full season of first-class cricket featuring all four competitions.
- Liverpool Victoria County Championship: England's four-day, two-innings, divisional tournament.
- NatWest Pro40: England's 40-over, One Day tournament between two divisions.
- C&G Trophy: A Limited Overs tournament with the winners of the North and South divisions playing for the trophy.
- Twenty20 Cup: England's Twenty20 competition.

=== The Ashes ===
Players can compete for The Ashes between England and Australia. The following options are available:

- Ashes 2005 scenarios: Players choose a team and play out scenarios from the 2005 Ashes series. On completing challenges, players are able to watch highlights videos in the Extras section.
- 2005 Npower Ashes series: Players choose either England or Australia and take them through all the warm up matches, ODIs and Test matches in the 2005 Ashes series. This is created as a balance in the form of an England-hosted tournament.
- 2006-07 3 Mobile Ashes Series: Players choose either England or Australia and take them through all the warm up matches, ODIs and Test matches in the 2006–07 Ashes series. This is created as a balance in the form of an Australia-hosted tournament.

== Licensing ==
EA Sports lost the licensing for most of the teams for Cricket 07. Only Australia, England, South Africa and New Zealand licensed player names and kits. All other team names are generic; however, they can be edited in the Team Management option or with a roster. Also, Australian players are blended into World squads of 2005 ICC Super Series, but all the names are generic. The following national teams are available:

- Australia
- Bangladesh
- Bermuda
- Canada
- England
- India
- Ireland
- Kenya
- Namibia
- Netherlands
- New Zealand
- Pakistan
- Scotland
- South Africa
- Sri Lanka
- United States
- West Indies
- Zimbabwe
Reception

Aggregate score
Aggregator	Score
GameRankings	(PS2) 70% (PC) 47%

Review score
Publication	Score
GameSpot	7.3/10

== Reception ==
Cricket 07 received praise for its redesigned batting controls, although reviewers criticised aspects of its bowling, graphics and presentation.

Randolph Ramsay of GameSpot awarded the game 7.3 out of 10 and described it as EA's best attempt at recreating cricket to that point. He particularly praised the new Century Stick batting system, which used the analogue sticks to control foot placement, shot selection and power, considering it more intuitive than the button-based system used in earlier games. Ramsay also praised the large selection of international and domestic competitions and regarded the game as a detailed simulation aimed primarily at established cricket followers.

GameSpot was less positive about the bowling controls, which Ramsay considered comparatively difficult and less enjoyable than batting. The review also criticised the game's lengthy match times, limited player likenesses, inconsistent animations, two-dimensional crowds and repetitive commentary from Richie Benaud and Mark Nicholas. Ramsay concluded that its problems made it unlikely to attract players who were not already interested in cricket.

Steve Boxer of The Guardian awarded the game three stars out of five. He similarly praised the redesigned batting system and timing meter, writing that batting had been a weakness of earlier entries in the series but that the new system worked effectively. Boxer also praised the commentary and the inclusion of modes based on both the 2006–07 Ashes series and the 2005 Ashes series, while considering the graphics less impressive. He described Cricket 07 as EA Sports' best cricket game to that point.

== Commercial performance ==
Cricket 07 achieved significant chart success in Australia. The PlayStation 2 version was the country's third-highest-selling game during the week of 25–31 December 2006, according to GfK Australia.

During the following chart period, covering 1–7 January 2007, the PlayStation 2 release reached number one on the Australian all-formats sales chart, replacing WWE SmackDown vs. Raw 2007. It fell to seventh place the following week.

GfK Australia subsequently ranked the PlayStation 2 version as the ninth-highest-selling video game in Australia by units during the first half of 2007. It was one of five PlayStation titles in the overall top ten for the period.

== Legacy ==
Cricket 07 developed a lasting following after its release, particularly through the Windows version's modding community. In 2021, HT Tech described it as "arguably the most popular cricket game" of the preceding decade and noted that its modding community remained active fifteen years after its original release. Community modifications continued to update elements including teams and other game content long after official support ended.

The same publication continued to use Cricket 07 as a point of comparison for later cricket games. In its review of Cricket 22, HT Tech described Cricket 07 as a benchmark for cricket video games fourteen years after its release, praising its accessibility and gameplay while contrasting it with the greater complexity of newer simulations.

Its cultural recognition remained evident into the 2020s. During an India–South Africa Twenty20 match in 2024, former Indian international Wasim Jaffer referenced Cricket 07 when reacting to the unusually high scoring of Sanju Samson and Tilak Varma, with Hindustan Times noting the game's use as a recognisable comparison for exaggerated batting performances.

In 2026, Hindustan Times described Cricket 07 as a particularly iconic cricket video game and recalled its altered unlicensed player names, soundtrack, commentary and historical Ashes scenarios as recognisable elements for players who grew up with the game. The publication contrasted its enduring reputation with subsequent attempts to establish new cricket video game series. In the same article, former EA cricket developer Mike McCabe cited increasing development costs, expanding development teams and the need for publishers to prioritise among sports franchises when discussing EA's withdrawal from cricket games.
