= International Cricket (video game) =

1992 video game

- Cover art of International Cricket
- Developer: Beam Software
- Publisher: Laser Beam
- Designer: Jef Kamenek
- Programmers: Brian Post, Darren Bremner
- Artists: Paul Mitchell, Grant Arthur, Joe Rimmer
- Composers: Marshall Parker (Music), Gavan Anderson (Sound Effects)
- Platform: NES
- Release: AU: 1992
- Genre: Sports (cricket)
- Modes: Single-player, multiplayer

International Cricket is a cricket video game developed by Beam Software and released under their Laser Beam publishing arm for the Nintendo Entertainment System in 1992. Aussie Rules Footy shares the same presentation style as this game. Like Aussie Rules Footy, the game was distributed exclusively by Mattel's Australian operation.

There were no attempts to release a cricket video game to the North American, Japanese, or European markets. The reason is that baseball games dominated the North American and Japanese markets, while football dominated the European market during that era. Two buttons are used to control the action; one for hitting the cricket ball while the other allows the player to slog around.

One of the shortcomings in the game is the simple AI; the average player can bowl the computer out for totals not exceeding 20.

== Naming parodies ==
The game featured all the major Test cricket–playing nations but no official team and player licensing in place. This meant that player names within the game, particularly for the Australian team, were parodies on the actual names of cricket players at the time. Following is a list of player names from the game and their respective actual names from Test-playing teams.

- A. Boulder – Allan Border
- M. Sailor – Mark Taylor
- D. Boost – David Boon
- G. Swamp – Geoff Marsh
- J. Dean – Dean Jones
- S. Mars – Steve Waugh
- I. Hilly – Ian Healy
- R. Bruce – Bruce Reid
- M. Ewes – Mark Waugh
- C. McDirt – Craig McDermott
- H. Mervyn – Merv Hughes
- P. Tail – Peter Taylor
- T. Oldman – Terry Alderman

== Sequels ==
International Cricket was followed by an updated sequel for the Super NES, Super International Cricket, in 1994. Beam Software would also develop Cricket 96 and Cricket 97 for EA Sports.
