= Casey Powell Lacrosse 16 =

2016 sports video game

- Developer: Big Ant Studios
- Publisher: Crosse Studios
- Platforms: Microsoft Windows, PlayStation 4, Xbox One
- Release: March 9, 2016
- Genre: Sports
- Modes: Single-player, multiplayer

Casey Powell Lacrosse 16 is a field lacrosse simulation video game developed by Big Ant Studios and published by Crosse Studios for Microsoft Windows, PlayStation 4 and Xbox One that was released on March 9, 2016. Casey Powell was a star lacrosse player at Syracuse University and in Major League Lacrosse.

Community Share has allowed for over 50 collegiate lacrosse teams and more than 9 pro lacrosse teams and developer-created teams.
