= Don Bradman Cricket 14 =

2014 video game

- Cover image for the game
- Developer: Big Ant Studios
- Publisher: Tru Blu Entertainment
- Series: Don Bradman Cricket
- Platforms: PlayStation 3, Xbox 360, Microsoft Windows, PlayStation 4, Xbox One
- Release: PlayStation 3, Xbox 360: AU: 3 April 2014; EU: 11 April 2014; Microsoft Windows: WW: 26 June 2014; PlayStation 4, Xbox One: WW: 11 February 2015
- Genre: Sports
- Modes: Single-player, Multiplayer

Don Bradman Cricket 14 (re-release retitled Don Bradman Cricket) is a cricket video game for the PlayStation 3, Xbox 360, Microsoft Windows, PlayStation 4 and Xbox One. It was developed by Big Ant Studios and published by Tru Blu Entertainment. The game was originally released for PlayStation 3 and Xbox 360 consoles in various countries that compete in cricket in April 2014; it was released for PlayStation 4 and Xbox One on 11 February 2015. Its sequel Don Bradman Cricket 17 was released on 16 December 2016.

== Features ==
The game features a number of different game modes, including a career mode, custom matches and online games. The career mode involves a user creating a player who starts off at 16 years old and plays for a career of up to 20 years. There is also a Cricket Academy program in which a user can create and edit teams, players and competitions. This was released as a stand-alone game before the console release date.

The game contains the original cricket stats of every player and they can be modified too. Each cricketer face is created in a realistic way to experience a new feel. Big Ant Studios updated the academy and brought the 'Practice Nets' feature into it in the weeks prior to the launch of the full game. The gameplay features were announced as having "Unique Batting and Bowling Controls" with a full 360 shot delivery with no shot markers. The gameplay also involves a "Fully featured Fielding System" which allows "full control of the field". The Ball Physics in the game has been labelled as having "realistic edges and ball movement off players". Appeal and Electric Reviews have also been included into the game, which enables a user to challenge the umpire for a decision in which is questionable. There are Practice nets and Match practice which are new features to the game and are supposed to help a new 'cricketing gamer' to play the game. Users can also save games online and offline. The commentary team consists of Matthew Hill and David Basheer.

There are 11 unlicensed grounds within the game, with 2 licensed. The game includes 79 teams within the game, most of which are unlicensed. There are international and domestic teams (current generation) historical teams and future generation teams. There are 17 international teams, 6 Australian domestic teams, 18 English domestic, along with "All time best" teams and "historical" teams.

== Development ==
According to Ross Symons, CEO of Big Ant Studios, development of the game was hindered by the parallel development of Ashes Cricket 2013, an officially licensed rival cricket game. Symons claims that the developers of Ashes Cricket 2013 applied pressure via the Australian Cricket Board to warn various partners off his game, while the eventual poor reception to Ashes Cricket 2013 forced him to delay Don Bradman Cricket 14 as not to be caught up in the controversy.

The game was built using a Big Ant Studios-built game engine written in Assembly language and C++.

== Soundtrack ==
Track listing
No.	Title	Length
1.	"Feels Like Real"
2.	"Looking Good"
3.	"Off the Radar"
4.	"Road Junkie"
5.	"Rokit"
6.	"Smiley"

== Reception ==
Reception

Aggregate scores
Aggregator	Score
GameRankings	(PS3) 75.00% (X360) 73.00% (PC) 80.00%
Metacritic	(PS3) 73/100 (X360) 73/100 (PC) 80/100

Don Bradman Cricket 14 has received positive reviews from critics. Tristan Ogilvie of IGN rated the console version 6.8/10, praising the "comprehensive control setup" and "License-dodging player creation", but also criticised the high amount of bugs, lack of field radars and unrealistic super-fielders. However, the PC version was rated 8/10 by IGN, who later believed that the fixes made it in the interim turned it into "easily the finest and fully-featured cricket game ever made". Dene Benham of NZGamer gave the game 7.9/10, praising the batting and bowling aspects, but criticised the clunky menus and twitchy animations. Critical Hit awarded it 8.7 citing it as "the best cricket game of last generation".

== Legacy ==
Retrospective coverage has credited Don Bradman Cricket 14 with establishing several features that continued in later cricket games developed by Big Ant Studios. In 2019, The Daily Star highlighted features that Big Ant had introduced or developed from Don Bradman Cricket 14 through to Cricket 19. The publication noted that the Cricket Academy, first introduced with Don Bradman Cricket 14, continued to be updated in subsequent games and allowed the community to recreate international teams despite the absence of official player licences. It also identified Don Bradman Cricket 14 as the first cricket video game to feature both a first-person camera and a career mode, and praised its footwork-based batting system.

Following the release of the PlayStation 4 version, Big Ant managing director Ross Symons said that the game's public and critical reception had exceeded the studio's expectations and convinced it that a sequel was warranted. Symons said the developer had taken significant risks in redesigning established conventions of cricket video games, including its control systems and removal of traditional pitch markers and fielding radar. By March 2015, a sequel was in development alongside the final feature patch for Don Bradman Cricket 14.

The sequel, Don Bradman Cricket 17, was announced in May 2016. When its release date was announced later that year, Symons said Big Ant had been "overwhelmed" by the success of its first Don Bradman Cricket game and that players around the world were still playing it regularly.
