= Tennis World Tour =

2018 video game

- PEGI-rated PlayStation 4 cover art featuring Angelique Kerber, Roger Federer, and Stan Wawrinka
- Developer: Breakpoint Studio
- Publisher: Bigben Interactive
- Platforms: Microsoft Windows, Nintendo Switch, PlayStation 4, Xbox One
- Release: PlayStation 4, Xbox One; May 22, 2018; Microsoft Windows; June 12, 2018; Nintendo Switch; October 29, 2018
- Genre: Sports
- Mode: Single-player

Tennis World Tour is a tennis video game developed by Breakpoint Studio and published by Bigben Interactive for Nintendo Switch, PlayStation 4, Xbox One and Microsoft Windows. It was released on May 22, 2018 for PlayStation 4 and Xbox One, and the physical PlayStation 4 and Xbox One versions in Australia and New Zealand, as well as the Microsoft Windows and Nintendo Switch versions, was released on October 29.

== Development ==
The game was developed by Breakpoint Studio. It was published by French publisher, Bigben Interactive, who hurried it to market when it was only 20% complete.

Speaking to French publication Le Monde, and translated by Nintendo Life, BigBen founder Alain Falc said the game was "only 20% completed a few weeks before its release" but needed to be released in order to capitalise on the French Open and avoid "losing the benefit of marketing campaigns already committed" and added that BigBen "put 500,000 pieces on the market but with many distributors who have no right of return, so we know that will be profitable".

== Reception ==
Reception

Aggregate score
Aggregator	Score
Metacritic	(PS4) 45/100 (XONE) 42/100

Review scores
Publication	Score
Game Informer	4/10
Nintendo World Report	3.5/10

The critical response to Tennis World Tour has ranged from highly negative to at best average. Xbox Tavern was sharp, writing: "Tennis is a game of fluidity and precision, two things that Tennis World Tour, despite its decent career mode, fails miserably to realize". Game Informer was no more positive, writing that "even Pong had a reliability about it that this game lacks, and that was over 45 years ago" and giving the game 4/10. The Last Word On Tennis website, meanwhile, was highly critical of the state that the game was launched in, saying that while future updates may well improve the experience, at launch "the game is a complete mess. It's like an alpha version of the game" and gave the game 2/5. French publication, Gameblog.fr, was also critical of the game claiming the heritage of Top Spin: "Claiming Top Spin's heritage probably put too much pressure on Breakpoint to begin with, even more so considering the studio's obvious resource limitations comparatively" and gave the game 5/10.

The game shipped 500,000 units to market, which is not to say it sold that many at retail but, according to Bigben Interactive founder Alain Falc, "many distributors who have no right of return, so we know that will be profitable".

== Launch controversy ==
Tennis World Tour was advertised right up until release as having online multiplayer available in the game from launch. However, when the game launched, critics and players found that the "online multiplayer" component of the game was not present, and that a statement had been issued from the developer that it would be added in at a later date. The company apologized for what the media described as a bait-and-switch by promising players online multiplayer throughout the pre-order window.

== eSports ==
The French Tennis Federation hosted a Tennis World Tour eSports tournament in 2018 and 2019, with the final staged at the Stade Roland-Garros during the French Open.

Organisers of the Madrid Open hosted a virtual tournament using the game during the COVID-19 pandemic. The tournament featured a men's and women's draws with players playing as themselves in the game. The event was won by real life Madrid Open winners Andy Murray and Kiki Bertens.

== Sequel ==
A sequel, Tennis World Tour 2, was released on PlayStation 4, Xbox One, Nintendo Switch and Windows in September 2020.
