= Street Cricket (video game series) =

Street Cricket Champions
- Developer: Trine Games
- Publisher: Sony Computer Entertainment Europe
- Platform: PlayStation 2
- Genre: Sports (Cricket)

Street Cricket Champions is a backyard cricket game series released exclusively in India for PlayStation 2, PlayStation Portable, and PlayStation 3 (with PlayStation Move functionality). It was the first series of cricket games to be developed in India, by Mumbai-based studio Trine Games, as well as the first video games based on gully cricket.

The first sequel, Street Cricket Champions 2, was released on September 29, 2012, for PS2 and PSP. According to then-CEO of Trine Games, Sangam Gupta, this sequel was primarily a re-skin of the first game, with some bug fixes.

As the games are meant to depict amateur groups playing the game in the streets, no licensed player likenesses are featured.

A PS3 console bundle was released featuring Move Street Cricket II.

== Titles ==
- Street Cricket Champions
- Street Cricket Champions 2
- Move Street Cricket
- Move Street Cricket II

== Console bundles ==
- Fun with Family & Friends PlayStation 2 slim model boxed with Street Cricket Champions and Ra.One: The Game
- Fun with Family & Friends PlayStation 2 slim model boxed with Street Cricket Champions 2 and Don 2: The Game
- Move Street Cricket II PlayStation 3 super slim 12 GB model boxed with Move Street Cricket II and PlayStation Move starter pack

== See also ==
- List of cricket video games
