= Rugby 22 =

2022 video game

- Cover featuring Antoine Dupont, Cheslin Kolbe, and Will Skelton
- Developer: Eko Software
- Publisher: Nacon
- Engine: Havok
- Platforms: PlayStation 4; PlayStation 5; Windows; Xbox One; Xbox Series X/S
- Release: 27 January 2022
- Genres: Sports, simulation
- Modes: Single-player, multiplayer

Rugby 22 is a rugby union simulation video game developed by Eko Software and published by Nacon. It was released on 22 January 2022 for PlayStation 4, PlayStation 5, Windows, Xbox One and Xbox Series X/S. The game served as a sequel to Rugby 20 and was succeeded by Rugby 25.

== Development and release ==
During Nacon Connect in July 2021, Rugby 22 was first revealed and the game was scheduled to launch on 22 January 2022 for PlayStation 4, PlayStation 5, Windows, Xbox One and Windows.

== Licences ==
Rugby 22 has official licenses for the majority of the national teams, including Australia and New Zealand, and features official players and jerseys for France, Fiji, Italy, Ireland, Georgia, Wales, Scotland, and Japan.

== Reception ==
Reception

Aggregate score
Aggregator	Score
Metacritic	(XSXS) 59/100

Review score
Publication	Score
The Loadout	4/10

Rugby 22 received "mixed or average" reviews from critics, according to review aggregator site Metacritic.

The Loadout rated the game 4/10, and wrote: "While the new and improved tactics feature is a welcome addition, Rugby 22 feels like a game stuck in the early 2000s with a lack of modern-day features expected of titles in the sports genre." In a mixed review, Wales Online called it the best rugby game in "15 years" whilst also having some criticism, and stated: "Gameplay-wise, this game is probably the closest any title has come to capturing modern rugby, and is certainly the best on-field game since Rugby 08.While it's not perfect, and the game can either reward you or the computer for essentially breaking it with long, looping miss-passes from rucks, it does flow better than previous iterations." The Telegraph described the gameplay as "clumsy" and "downright glitchy".
