= Super International Cricket =

1995 video game

- Developer: Beam Software
- Publisher: Nintendo
- Designer: Steve French
- Composer: Marshall Parker
- Platform: Super NES
- Release: EU: July 1995
- Genre: Sports
- Modes: Single-player; Multiplayer

Super International Cricket is a cricket video game released in 1994 for the Super Nintendo Entertainment System, only in Australia and Europe. It is a sequel to International Cricket on the original Nintendo Entertainment System. The game was developed by Melbourne House (as Beam Software), with Nintendo publishing the game. Nintendo also included the game with a Super NES console bundle in Australia.

== Gameplay ==
Eight teams are included: Sri Lanka, Australia, England, South Africa, New Zealand, India, Pakistan and the West Indies. However, like its predecessor, Super International Cricket lacks official team and player licensing.

The game comes in three difficulty levels ranging from easy to hard. Games in the "World Series" and "Test match" modes could go on for five virtual days and still end in a draw.

Some of the players are named after the game developers (M. Parker is Marshall Parker, G. Anders is Gavan Anderson, A. Milgrom is Alfred Milgrom). Each player has a speed rating that determines how fast that they are able to gather runs for their respective teammates.

Bowlers have a choice between four types of ball delivery using four unique speeds for the actual ball delivery. The Australian method of scoring cricket is used; which is different from the international method. Only one stadium is featured in Super International Cricket.

== Sequels ==
Melbourne House followed Super International Cricket with two sequels, Cricket 96, which was developed in 1996 for EA Sports, and Cricket 97 the year after that. Unlike the FIFA video game series and later cricket titles for EA Sports, the International Cricket game series were standalone games and never got incremental improvements over the years.
