= David Basheer =

Australian football commentator (born 1966)

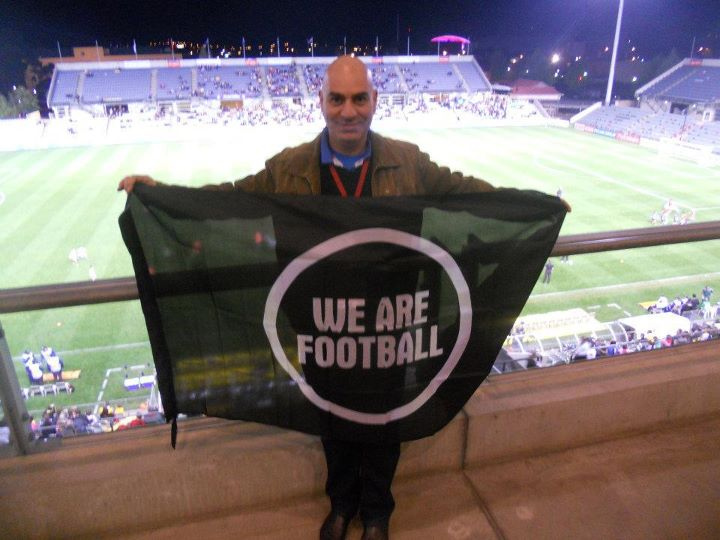
- Born: 1966 (age 59–60); Adelaide, South Australia
- Education: Prince Alfred College
- Occupation: Sports commentator
- Years active: 1986-present

David Basheer is an Australian sports commentator and presenter. He is best known for being a football commentator on the SBS Television, including the FIFA World Cup from 2010. He has also covered other sporting events, including Olympic Games, Commonwealth Games, Tour de France, and Grand Slam tennis tournaments.

== Early life and education ==
Basheer attended Prince Alfred College in Adelaide, South Australia, from 1975 to 1983, where he played cricket and football. In Year 11, he established a radio station at the school.

He obtained a Diploma of Audio Engineering at SAE Institute Adelaide campus.

== Career ==
Before starting in broadcasting, Basheer audio mixed commercials at Adelaide radio station 5AD.

Basheer's career in radio broadcasting started in 1986 at Adelaide radio station 5AA, where he worked as talkback producer, announcer, and sports reporter. In 1988, he won a cadetship with the Australian Broadcasting Corporation (ABC) as a sports broadcaster, where he started commentating on cricket, football, AFL, and harness racing. Basheer later moved to Network Ten's Adelaide studios for two years before being hired by SBS in 1995, where he covered football as well as athletics and cycling events.

While working for SBS, Basheer was also a host and commentator with ESPN Star Sports in Asia, commentating on the UEFA Champions League, La Liga, Formula 1 and the 2002 FIFA World Cup in South Korea and Japan. He has also worked for a variety of other international broadcasters, commentating at Olympic Football finals, athletics at the Commonwealth Games Athletics, and various tennis tournaments including the French Open, Japan Open, China Open and Australian Open.

Basheer appeared on The World Game from 2007 to 2018, following the departure of former host Andrew Orsatti. Alongside Les Murray, Basheer hosted SBS' UEFA European Championship coverage in 2008 and 2012. Basheer commentated A-League matches on Fox Sports for the 2013-14 A-League season.

In 2013, Basheer began commentating A-League games on SBS2 with Michael Bridges as his co-commentator. From 2013 to 2017, SBS held the broadcasting rights for one A-League match per round, held on Friday nights, which were simulcast on Fox Sports. In 2014, he featured as a commentator in the cricket video game Don Bradman Cricket 14.

Basheer has commentated for SBS at the FIFA World Cup since 2010, becoming the first Australian to commentate a World Cup final that year between Spain and the Netherlands. Basheer returned for the 2022 FIFA World Cup alongside Martin Tyler, Niav Owens, Sarah Walsh, Mark Bosnich, Richard Bayliss, and former full-time SBS pundit Craig Foster.

Basheer has commentated events at the Olympic Games, Commonwealth Games, Tour de France, World Championships of Athletics, and Grand Slam tennis events.

Basheer was a co-commentator on the world feed for the 2016 Summer Olympics football events, providing coverage for the official Olympics channel in the final between Brazil and Germany at the Maracanã Stadium.

In July 2023, Basheer was a commentator for the Seven Network's coverage of the 2023 FIFA Women's World Cup. After the opening match between the Matildas and Ireland, Basheer was criticised on Twitter for making what was perceived by some as a sexist comment about Matildas player Katrina Gorry, when he offered praise for her performance which included the words "Certainly motherhood has not blunted her competitive instincts".

== Other roles and activities ==
Basheer was chair of the Bone Growth Melbourne Tennis Charity for many years, helping to raise funds for research into children's bone growth.

== Recognition and honours ==
Basheer's alma mater, Prince Alfred College, recognised him by adding him to their gallery of "Princes Men".
