= Cricket 2000 =

2000 video game

- Developer: Krisalis Software
- Publisher: EA Sports
- Series: Cricket
- Platforms: PlayStation, Windows
- Release: UK: 24 March 2000 (PS); UK: 19 May 2000 (PC)
- Genre: Sports
- Modes: Single-player, multiplayer

Cricket 2000 is a Sports video game developed by Krisalis Software and published by EA Sports for Microsoft Windows and PlayStation. It is based on the 1999 Cricket World Cup and was officially licensed by the International Cricket Council.

== Gameplay ==
Cricket 2000 allows the player to select four distinctive modes: quick game, friendly, world cup tournament and super 6 tournament. Quick game randomises the two teams and the ground where a match is held, friendly match allows the player to freely choose any of the 12 nations represented in the game, and the world cup and super 6 tournaments have up to 12 human players controlling each country within two groups of six. The AI computer controls the players in the field but the player can dictate where the ball is thrown. When the player's team is batting, they can move the batsman around. Commentary is provided by former players Richie Benaud and David Gower.

== Development ==
Based on the 1999 Cricket World Cup, and officially licensed by the world governing body of cricket, the International Cricket Council, development of Cricket 2000 began in November 1998 by Krisalis Software in the South Yorkshire town of Rotherham who assembled a team of 12 people to work on it. Krisalis developed motion capture footage by analysing more than 500 individual movements of the English cricket players and brothers Adam Hollioake and Ben Hollioake. Benaud was selected as the lead commentator because the developers felt he was the ideal choice for the job and Benaud suggested to them that Gower be approached for his experience and reputation in the cricket world. Cricket 2000 was released by EA Sports for Microsoft Windows and PlayStation in 2000.

== Reception ==
Reception

Aggregate score
Aggregator	Score
GameRankings	(PS) 69.00% (PC) 57.00%

Review scores
Publication	Score
PlayStation Official Magazine – UK	4/10
PC PowerPlay	70%
PC Zone	51%
PC Gaming World	8/10

In April 2000, the game was listed fourth in the top ten selling console games by retail company Electronics Boutique. Cricket 2000 received mixed reviews from critics. Aggregate review website GameRankings gave the PlayStation version received 69.00% based on a single review and the PC version 57.00% based upon five reviewers. Jack Scofield of The Guardian criticised the graphics, calling them "crude" and "wooden", and the overall gameplay as "somewhat hit and miss". Birmingham Post's Simon Griffiths however was complimentary of its batting and bowling mechanisms but he was also critical of the batsmen's movements, which he felt were "unrealistic". Writing for PC Magazine, Daniel S. Evans recommended the game solely for cricket fans, while PC PowerPlay's Christian Read had similar feelings towards it, saying the gameplay remained challenging to arouse interest for a short amount of time.

In PC Gaming World, John Houlihan called the game "probably the premier playable cricket game on the PC today". The Daily Telegraph's reviewer called Cricket 2000 "a decent enough cricket game" that provides the player with "a fair degree of control over shot selection". David Gordon in The Independent gave Cricket 2000 two stars and called the graphics "average" and that the camera angles did not do much to "alleviate the boredom of playing through a five-day Test match". The Northern Echo's Steve Fountain criticised the controls, the graphics and suggested Cricket fans play Brian Lara Cricket. Powys County Times and Express described the title as "diabolical "gameplay and graphics-wise and said it had "no passion, no skill and importantly no class." Paul Martin of Slough and South Bucks Observer gave it a rating of 69 per cent and felt it was too similar to the previous title in the series.
