= International Cricket Captain =

- Cover art for International Cricket Captain III on PSP
- Genres: Sports (cricket)
- Developers: Empire Interactive, Childish Things
- Publishers: Empire Interactive, P2 Games
- Platforms: Microsoft Windows, PlayStation, PlayStation 2, PSP
- First release: International Cricket Captain; 1998
- Latest release: Cricket Captain 2024; 6 June 2024

Cricket Captain, formerly International Cricket Captain, is a series of cricket management video games by Empire Interactive, and by Childish Things since International Cricket Captain 2009, before which Empire went into administration. It rose to popularity in 1998, following the release of the first PC-based game in the series. The most recent version of the game is Cricket Captain 2025.

The concept for International Cricket Captain was the idea of Chris Child, who programmed the original game engine as a university project. Empire producer Brian Walker produced and co-designed the game in which the player takes control of an English County Cricket squad with the aim of leading them to success in the domestic competition and ultimately being asked to take up the position of England manager. There is also an added option in later games in the ICC series to take control of one of the other Test playing nations.

Taking inspiration from the Championship Manager series of games which were also produced by Brian Walker, most aspects of a management sim are present in ICC, with the ability to coach players on their individual skills, scout opposition and buy and sell players at the end of each season. There are also comprehensive statistics available in the form of career stats pages for each player and team. Graphs and charts help the gamer to select the strongest team possible against particular opposition.

== Transition to console ==
Although mainly a PC based series, there have been console cross-overs, most notably for ICC 2001 which appeared on the PlayStation. However, the PS version was limited in features compared to its PC cousin and as a result was not very successful. Aside from the lack of on-line play capability, gamers noted that the transition to the console meant longer loading periods and a slightly more tedious controller-based interface.

== Game engine revamp ==
ICC III was released on 6 July 2007 including a new algorithmic method of calculating player performances and a 3D match engine with motion captured shots. These changes are arguably a result of the competition that International Cricket Captain now faces from the popular Cricket Coach series, developed by Rockingham Software. The new engine replaces the original graphic highlights which were retained for each of the previous versions of the game, save minor cosmetic tweaks.

== Criticism ==
Over recent years, a common criticism from games reviewers is of the perceived lack of progress in terms of the game's functionality, with the obvious change between versions tending to be limited to updated players and statistics.

== Games in the series ==
- International Cricket Captain
- Australian Cricket Captain
- International Cricket Captain 2
- International Cricket Captain 2000
- International Cricket Captain 2001 & Ashes Edition
- International Cricket Captain 2002
- International Cricket Captain 2005 & Ashes Edition
- International Cricket Captain 2006
- International Cricket Captain 2006: Ashes Edition
- International Cricket Captain III 2007:
- International Cricket Captain 2008
- International Cricket Captain 2009: Ashes Edition
- International Cricket Captain 2010
- International Cricket Captain 2011
- International Cricket Captain 2012
- International Cricket Captain 2013
- Cricket Captain 2014
- Cricket Captain 2015
- Cricket Captain 2016
- Cricket Captain 2017
- Cricket Captain 2018
- Cricket Captain 2019
- Cricket Captain 2020
- Cricket Captain 2021
- Cricket Captain 2022
- Cricket Captain 2023
- Cricket Captain 2024
- Cricket Captain 2025

=== International Cricket Captain ===
The player is able to take control of the English County side of their choice from the 1998 Season with the aim of becoming accomplished enough to captain the English national side.

The player must guide their chosen County Championship side through an English cricket season, playing English county cricket as well as regular first class matches. During close season, contract negotiations take place in which players are transferred between clubs or retire from the game altogether. There is also a pool of overseas players (from which the player can sign only one, in line with the regulations of the time).

The player receives a new points total each season based on their performance. If they have accrued enough points they are invited to coach the England team. This involves selecting a squad from the extensive pool of English county players and managing them in One Day International and Test Matches, including an annual winter tour. The game continues for twenty seasons until 2018, at which point the player is forced into retirement and the game ends.

=== Australian Cricket Captain ===
Australian Cricket Captain, featuring Australian State teams and competitions, was released to the Australasian market in 1999. The game is almost identical to the original release in terms of gameplay aside from a revamp of the contracting system and minor cosmetic tweaks. There is also a commentary by former Australian captain Ian Chappell.

=== Sequels ===
New releases of International Cricket Captain were made every year, with primarily minor cosmetic changes. These games are International Cricket Captain 2, International Cricket Captain 2000, International Cricket Captain 2001 (and the Ashes Edition), International Cricket Captain 2002, and International Cricket Captain 2005 (and the Ashes Edition).

=== International Cricket Champion 2006 ===
International Cricket Captain 2006 was released on the PC. In England, batsmen Kevin Pietersen is featured on the cover, whereas the Australian version features fast bowler Brett Lee.

When playing single player you can choose one of four modes to play.

- Full Game - You take control of a County Team with the possibility of "captaining" the England cricket team.
- County and England - You take control of a County Team and England from the very beginning.
- International Only - Take control of any of the 10 Test cricket nations.
- Scenario - Relive a classic cricket match from the past.
- Two Player - Go head to head with a friend.

International Cricket Captain 2006 featured online play where you could take on another player in either a First Class or ODI match.

International Cricket Captain 2006: Ashes Edition' is a video game, the eighth from the popular International Cricket Captain Series. It was purposely made for England's attempt to retain The Ashes in Australia. It is mainly a roster update from International Cricket Captain 2006 but also includes 6 ashes scenarios.

=== International Cricket Captain III ===
International Cricket Captain III
- Developer: Empire Interactive
- Publisher: Empire Interactive
- Designer: Chris Child
- Platforms: PC; PS2; PSP
- Release: July 6, 2007; November 16, 2007 (PSP)
- Genre: Sports
- Modes: Single-player & Multiplayer

International Cricket Captain III is the ninth iteration of the ICC series.

Released in the summer of 2007, the game boasted the largest number of changes to the series for many versions including new 3D graphics and changes to the underlying match engine. A demo, playable for a maximum of 48 hours (two calendar days) was available at the developer's website. International Cricket Captain III is also available for the PlayStation 2 and PlayStation Portable.

=== International Cricket Captain 2008 ===
International Cricket Captain 2008
- Release: EU: Jun 27, 2008
- Genre: Sports

International Cricket Captain 2008 featured on its United Kingdom cover, England's Monty Panesar. It contained all contemporary cricket players from first class cricket, Test cricket, List-A and One Day International teams, and can be played in a career mode indefinitely, with repeating domestic and international fixtures generated for each year, along with youth players continually added and other players retiring to enable an open-ended career as coach of a national or domestic side.

=== International Cricket Captain 2009 ===
- Developer: Childish Things
- Publisher: 2P Games
- Series: International Cricket Captain
- Platform: Microsoft Windows
- Release: July 2, 2009
- Genre: Sports Simulation

International Cricket Captain 2009 is the 12th game in the series so far. It contains all current cricket players from first class cricket, Test cricket, List-A and One Day International teams, and can be played in a career mode indefinitely, with repeating domestic and international fixtures generated for each year, along with youth players continually added and other players retiring to enable an open-ended career as coach of a national or domestic side. There have been many improvements in the game from the previous instalment International Cricket Captain 2008. It was first released on 2 July as a download only from the Childish Things website, and the box version was released on 17 July 2009.

=== International Cricket Captain 2010 ===
International Cricket Captain 2010
- Developer: Childish Things
- Publisher: P2 Games
- Series: International Cricket Captain
- Platform: Microsoft Windows
- Release: June 5, 2010
- Genre: Sports Simulation

International Cricket Captain 2010 is the 13th edition of the International Cricket Captain series. It contains all current cricket players from first class cricket, Test cricket, List-A and One Day International teams, and can be played in a career mode indefinitely, with repeating domestic and international fixtures generated for each year, along with youth players continually added and other players retiring to enable an open-ended career as coach of a national or domestic side. The game features all teams and competitions from the English Domestic Season, International teams and competitions including the T20 World Cup and for the first time in the Cricket Captain series, all teams and competitions from the Australian Domestic Season.

Players can choose to take control of one of the eighteen county sides and participates in the County Championship, Clydesdale Bank 40 and Twenty20 Cup. After each season players take part in the transfer market recruiting new players for their side and they can choose one main overseas player, one reserve overseas player and two T20 overseas player which can only play in T20 matches.

Players can also choose to take control of one of the six State sides and participates in Sheffield Shield, Ford Ranger One Day Cup and KFC Twenty20 Big Bash after each season players can choose new players in the transfer market and they get two randomly selected overseas player.

As with previous versions, the entire County cricket sphere is open to the player, with each of the counties as a playable team. New to the 2010 edition is the inclusion of the Australian state cricket teams, the New South Wales Blues, Victorian Bushrangers, Western Warriors, Southern Redbacks, Queensland Bulls and Tasmanian Tigers. All international Test playing nations and Zimbabwe also feature, as well as all One Day International playing teams though these are unplayable.

=== International Cricket Captain 2011 ===
International Cricket Captain 2011
- Developer: Childish Things
- Publisher: P2 Games
- Series: International Cricket Captain
- Platforms: Microsoft Windows, Mac OS
- Release: 8 June 2011
- Genre: Sports Simulation

International Cricket Captain 2011 is the 14th edition of the International Cricket Captain series

ICC 2011 received mixed reviews: GameSpot concluded that "international Cricket Captain 2011 doesn't break any new ground, but a wealth of real-life statistics married to a solid management sim makes it worth the investment for any budding cricket captains."

=== International Cricket Captain 2013 ===
International Cricket Captain 2013
- Developer: Childish Things
- Publisher: P2 Games
- Series: International Cricket Captain
- Platforms: Microsoft Windows, Mac OS
- Release: June 2013
- Genre: Sports Simulation

International Cricket Captain 2013 is the sixteenth installment of the International Cricket Captain series. Produced by Childish Things on Microsoft Windows and Mac OS, it follows the release of International Cricket Captain 2012 the previous year.

Built upon previous versions, with updated statistics for current players, ICC '13' also included new features: "All-Time Greats" in which players can assemble teams of great cricketers from different eras; "Classic England vs. Australia" in which players can replay one of five classic test matches from the England / Australia rivalry; international on-line, enabling players to engage in international Test, ODI and T20 matches. Various graphical and interface upgrades were also introduced, as well as the ability to pick opposition teams in custom series. It was released on 29 June 2013, a day later than planned following the discovery of an unexpected error.

=== Cricket Captain 2014 ===
Producer: Childish Things Season: 2014 and Abroad Features: English County Cricket, Australian Domestic First Class, Indian Premier League, Indian First Class, International Tests, ODIs, T20s and List A.

=== Cricket Captain 2015 ===
The latest edition in the series, Cricket Captain 2015, was released on 8 July 2015 on Steam and has received mixed reviews from players, most noting that there aren't many changes in the game except for a few minor additions and a statistical update.

=== Cricket Captain 2016 ===
International Cricket Captain 2016
- Developer: Childish Things
- Publisher: KISS ltd
- Series: International Cricket Captain
- Platforms: Microsoft Windows, Mac OS, IOS
- Release: 5 July 2016
- Genre: Sports Simulation

Cricket Captain 2016 was released on 5 July 2016 on Steam; new features included playable New Zealand and South African Domestic teams, Updated One Day International (ODI) and 20 over (T20) World Cup Tournament modes. International teams that played in the last two World Cups including Afghanistan, Hong Kong, Ireland, Netherlands, Oman, Scotland or the UAE were playable.

=== Cricket Captain 2017 ===
International Cricket Captain 2018
- Developer: Childish Things
- Publisher: KISS ltd
- Series: International Cricket Captain
- Platforms: Microsoft Windows, Mac OS, Android, IOS
- Release: 6 July 2017
- Genre: Sports Simulation

Cricket Captain 2017 was released on 6 July 2017. New features include the new twenty-over leagues in West Indies, South Africa, Pakistan, and Bangladesh

- Ground Records
- International Versus Records
- four new modelled grounds: Cardiff, Taunton, Bristol and Hobart with updated ground models for existing grounds
- Historical Scenarios: England vs South Africa 2003, 1998 and England vs West Indies 1995, 1984 and 1957
- New database with improved player ability and player type accuracy
- Pakistan Domestic cricket

=== Cricket Captain 2018 ===
International Cricket Captain 2018
- Developer: Childish Things
- Publisher: KISS ltd
- Series: International Cricket Captain
- Platforms: Microsoft Windows, Mac OS, Android, IOS
- Release: 13 July 2018
- Genre: Sports Simulation

Cricket Captain 2018 was released on 13 July 2018.

=== Cricket Captain 2019 ===
International Cricket Captain 2019
- Developer: Childish Things
- Publisher: KISS ltd
- Series: International Cricket Captain
- Platforms: Microsoft Windows, Mac OS, Android, IOS
- Release: 16 June 2019
- Genre: Sports Simulation

Cricket Captain 2019 was released on 16 June 2019.

=== Cricket Captain 2020 ===
International Cricket Captain 2020
- Developer: Childish Things
- Publisher: KISS ltd
- Series: International Cricket Captain
- Platforms: Microsoft Windows, Mac OS, Android, IOS
- Release: 4 August 2020
- Genre: Sports Simulation

Cricket Captain 2020 was released on 4 August 2020.

=== Cricket Captain 2021 ===
International Cricket Captain 2021
- Developer: Childish Things
- Publisher: KISS ltd
- Series: International Cricket Captain
- Platforms: Microsoft Windows, Mac OS, Android, IOS
- Release: 26 July 2021
- Genre: Sports Simulation

Cricket Captain 2021 was released on 26 July 2021.

=== Cricket Captain 2022 ===
International Cricket Captain 2022
- Developer: Childish Things
- Publisher: KISS ltd
- Series: International Cricket Captain
- Platforms: Microsoft Windows, Mac OS, Android, IOS
- Release: 24 June 2022
- Genre: Sports Simulation

Cricket Captain 2022 was released on 24 June 2022.

=== Cricket Captain 2023 ===
International Cricket Captain 2023
- Developer: Childish Things
- Publisher: KISS ltd
- Series: International Cricket Captain
- Platforms: Microsoft Windows, Mac OS, Android, IOS
- Release: 16 June 2023
- Genre: Sports Simulation

Cricket Captain 2023 was released on 16 June 2023.

=== Cricket Captain 2024 ===
International Cricket Captain 2024
- Developer: Childish Things
- Publisher: KISS ltd
- Series: International Cricket Captain
- Platforms: Microsoft Windows, Mac OS, Android, IOS
- Release: 13 June 2024
- Genre: Sports Simulation

Cricket Captain 2024 was released on 13 June 2024.

=== Cricket Captain 2025 ===
International Cricket Captain 2025
- Developer: Childish Things
- Publisher: KISS ltd
- Series: International Cricket Captain
- Platforms: Microsoft Windows, Mac OS, Android, IOS
- Release: 27 June 2025
- Genre: Sports Simulation

Cricket Captain 2025 was released on 27th June 2025.
