= Ashes Cricket =

2017 video game

- The Xbox One edition cover for Ashes Cricket.
- Developer(s): Big Ant Studios
- Publisher(s): Big Ant Studios
- Platform(s): PlayStation 4, Xbox One, Windows
- Release: November 2017
- Genre(s): Sports
- Mode(s): Single-player, multiplayer

Ashes Cricket is a 2017 video game created by Big Ant Studios, and released worldwide on PlayStation 4, Xbox One, and Windows. It was the first Big Ant cricket game to be officially licensed to modern teams and players after the Don Bradman Cricket titles, and had the full licence for the 2017-18 Ashes series, which took place in Australia. As part of this, the game contained the ability to take either England or Australia through the Ashes series, or play as an individual star player. As well as this, the game featured a player creation tool that could be used to either create real players and publish them on the game's "cricket academy", or use them in the series or personal player careers.

Its sequel Cricket 19 was released in May 2019.

== Reception ==
Reception

Aggregate score
Aggregator	Score
Metacritic	79/100 (XBO); 73/100 (PS4)

Review scores
Publication	Score
GameSpot	7/10
IGN	8/10

Ashes Cricket was scored positively based on the authenticity and accuracy of the way it represents cricket, with IGN scoring the game 8/10 and noting "There has never been a cricket game this approachable, fully-featured, or fun, and the inclusion of licensed Ashes squads and stadia is just the icing on what is already an exceedingly customisable cricket cake". On Steam, it got a 9/10, from 309 reviews.
