= Masquerade: The Baubles of Doom =

2016 video game

- North American cover art
- Developer: Big Ant Studios
- Publisher: Big Ant Studios (Note: Published by Home Entertainment Suppliers in North America for PlayStation 3, PlayStation 4, and Xbox 360.)
- Director: Mark Bracken
- Producer: Mark Bracken
- Platforms: PlayStation 3 PlayStation 4 Windows; Xbox 360; Xbox One
- Release: April 20, 2016: Windows; WW: April 20, 2016; PlayStation 3, PlayStation 4; NA/PAL: April 20, 2016; Xbox 360, Xbox One; NA/EU: April 20, 2016; EU: April 29, 2016 (XONE)
- Genres: Action-adventure; Beat 'em up
- Modes: Single-player, multiplayer

Masquerade: The Baubles of Doom is an action-adventure beat 'em up video game both developed and published by Big Ant Studios. The game was released in April 2016 for PlayStation 3, PlayStation 4, Xbox 360 and Xbox One, and Microsoft Windows.

== Gameplay ==
In Masquerade: The Baubles of Doom, players control Jaxx (and Comedia with multiplayer), a jester on a quest to retrieve stolen Baubles of Doom from an evil sorcerer. The game features exploration, puzzle-solving, and combat mechanics across various levels.

A central gameplay element involves the ability to switch between different masks, each granting Jaxx unique abilities. These masks include a knight mask for combat, a ninja mask for stealth, and a wizard mask for puzzle-solving.

Players navigate through levels by performing 'acrobatic moves and combat combos.' Hidden collectibles and secrets are scattered throughout levels, encouraging exploration and replayability.

== Reception ==
Reception

Aggregate score
Aggregator	Score
Metacritic	56/100

Review scores
Publication	Score
Push Square	5/10
CD-Action	6/10

Masquerade: The Baubles of Doom received "mixed or average" reviews according to review aggregator Metacritic.

Kieran Harris for Push Square rated the game 5 out of 10 stars, stating that "Although it may be undeniably pretty, Masquerade: The Baubles of Doom suffers from a number of glaring flaws that prevent it from being a worthwhile experience."

CD-Action rated the game 6/10 in their magazine, stating that "Masquerade is a bit like Leslie Nielsen's comedy movies – silly and childish, but it's hard to hold back laughter. It's a pity that the gameplay can't keep up with the humor, exposing the developers' tight budget and lack of experience."
