= Rugby 25 =

2025 video game

- Developer: Big Ant Studios
- Publisher: Nacon
- Platforms: PlayStation 4; PlayStation 5; Windows; Xbox One; Xbox Series X/S
- Release: 13 February 2025
- Genres: Sports, simulation
- Modes: Single-player, multiplayer

Rugby 25 is a rugby union simulation video game developed by Big Ant Studios and published by Nacon. It was released in early access for Windows on 28 June 2024. The full version was released on 13 February 2025 alongside versions for the PlayStation 4, PlayStation 5, Xbox One and Xbox Series X/S. The game served as a sequel to Rugby 22.

== Development and release ==
In March 2023, it was announced then-titled Rugby 24 would be released on 7 September, one day before the 2023 Rugby World Cup. The game was delayed until 30 January 2024 to improve the gameplay and because of the difficulties of gaining access to top teams' players to capture 3D photos prior to the World Cup. It was subsequently delayed again, but an early access version was scheduled to launch for Windows via Steam in March 2024. The early access would also be delayed.

On 27 June 2024, the game was rebranded to Rugby 25, with the early access on Steam launching a day later and Big Ant Studios apologising for the significant delays. The game fully launched for Windows on 13 February 2025 alongside versions for PlayStation 4, PlayStation 5, Xbox One and Xbox Series X/S.

== Licenses ==
Rugby 25 features the licenses for ten leagues, 140 clubs and nations, and 120 official women's teams. The game also features the license for the Six Nations.

== Reception ==
Reception

Review scores
Publication	Score
Digitally Downloaded	4.5/5
NAG Magazine	25/100

Digitally Downloaded stated that the majority of issues can be fixed with patches, with the "expection of the AI and personality of the teams" and rated the game 4.5/5, but described the scoring as "tricky" and wrote that the score is "reflective" of where they believe the game will end up. South African based NAG Magazine rated the game 25/100 and wrote: "Rugby 25 is not just a bad rugby game, it’s a bad game overall. It feels unfinished as if it were the first version of the game meant for pre-alpha testing."
