= Cricket 24 =

2023 video game

- The cover art featuring Pat Cummins, Meg Lanning, Ben Stokes and Heather Knight
- Developer: Big Ant Studios
- Publisher: Nacon
- Series: Cricket Series
- Engine: In-House Engine
- Platforms: Microsoft Windows; PlayStation 4 PlayStation 5 Xbox One; Xbox Series X/S; Nintendo Switch
- Release: Windows, PS4, PS5, Xbox One, Xbox Series X/S: WW: 5 October 2023; Nintendo Switch: WW: 27 March 2024
- Genre: Sports game
- Modes: Single-player, Multiplayer

Cricket 24 is a cricket video game developed by Big Ant Studios and published by Nacon. It is the official video game of the 2023 Ashes series of cricket matches, and the sequel to the 2021 game Cricket 22. It was released on October 5, 2023. It is the eighth game from Big Ant Studios' ongoing Cricket series of games.

== Licensing ==
Cricket 24 features over 200 real players with full photogrammetry. Cricket nations include Australia, England, Pakistan, West Indies, New Zealand and Ireland. The game also includes tournaments like The Ashes, the KFC BBL and Weber WBBL, The Hundred, the Caribbean Premier League and the newly added Pakistan Super League, plus a number of professional Indian T20 teams. Cricket 24 also has more than 50 officially licensed stadiums.
