= Big Ant Studios =

Australian video game developer

Big Ant Studios Pty Ltd
- Type: Subsidiary
- Industry: Video games
- Founded: 2000; 26 years ago
- Founder: Ross Symons
- Headquarters: Southbank, Victoria, Australia
- Key people: Ross Symons (CEO)
- Number of employees: 170
- Parent: Nacon (2021–present)
- Website: bigant.com

Big Ant Studios is an Australian video game developer based in Southbank, Victoria, a suburb of Melbourne. Founded in 2000 by chief executive officer Ross Symons, the company specialises in the development of sports games. Big Ant's games include Cricket 26, Cricket 22, Rugby League Live 4, AFL Live, AFL 23, AFL 26, Cricket 24, Rugby 25 and Tiebreak: Official game of the ATP and WTA.

== History ==
The studio was founded in 2001 and was originally named Bull Ant Studios, but renamed as "it was getting mispronounced all around the world because they don't have bull ants", according to Ross Symons. The studio initially worked primarily as a "studio for hire" with publishers such as THQ and Konami before moving towards sports games. Symons has explained this move on the basis that "Sport is renewable. There's always a sequel. There's always another season”.

The studio's first sports game was Rugby League title Rugby League Live, released in 2010, for the PC, PlayStation 3 and Xbox 360. The studio has since gone to make further Rugby League games, as well as Australian Rules Football, cricket, lacrosse and tennis titles.

In January 2021, French video game publisher Nacon acquired Big Ant for €35 million. Symons has commented on his ambition "to grow Big Ant Studios into the largest developer of sports entertainment software in the world", and increase staff numbers from 66 (as of April 2022) to 200.

In April 2023, Big Ant opened a second studio in Adelaide.

== Games developed ==
Year	Title	Platform(s)	Publisher	Notes	Ref
2006	Sprint Cars: Road to Knoxville	Microsoft Windows, Xbox 360, PlayStation 2	THQ		
2006	The Legend of Spyro: A New Beginning	Game Boy Advance	Vivendi Universal Games (Note: Released under the Sierra Entertainment brand name)	Developed with Krome Studios	
2007	The Legend of Spyro: The Eternal Night	PlayStation 2, Wii	Vivendi Universal Games	Developed with Krome Studios	
2008	Hellboy: The Science of Evil	PlayStation Portable	Konami	Developed with Krome Studios	
2008	Sprint Cars 2: Showdown at Eldora	PlayStation 2	THQ		
2009	Short Track Racing: Trading Paint	PlayStation 2	THQ		
2010	Rugby League Live	Microsoft Windows, PlayStation 3, Xbox 360	Tru Blu Entertainment		
2010	World of Outlaws: Sprint Cars	PlayStation 3, Xbox 360	THQ		
2010	Truth or Lies	PlayStation 3, Wii, Xbox 360	THQ		
2011	AFL Live	Microsoft Windows, PlayStation 3, Xbox 360	Tru Blu Entertainment		
2011	Pirate Blast	Wii	Zoo Games		
2012	Rugby League Live 2	iOS, PlayStation 3, Xbox 360	Tru Blu Entertainment		
2012	Jetpack Joyride	PlayStation 3, PlayStation Vita	Big Ant Studios	Port	
2013	Fruit Ninja	PlayStation Vita	Big Ant Studios	Port	
2014	Don Bradman Cricket 14	Microsoft Windows, PlayStation 3, PlayStation 4, Xbox 360, Xbox One	Tru Blu Entertainment		
2014	Jetpack Joyride Deluxe	PlayStation 3, PlayStation Vita	Big Ant Studios	Port	
2015	Rugby League Live 3	Microsoft Windows, PlayStation 3, PlayStation 4, Xbox 360, Xbox One	Tru Blu Entertainment		
2015	TableTop Cricket	Microsoft Windows, Xbox 360, PlayStation 3	Big Ant Studios		
2016	Big Bash Cricket	Android, iOS	Cricket Australia		
2016	Casey Powell Lacrosse 16	Microsoft Windows, PlayStation 4, Xbox One	Big Ant Studios		
2016	Don Bradman Cricket 17	PlayStation 4, Xbox One	Tru Blu Entertainment		
2016	Jetpack Joyride	PlayStation 4	Big Ant Studios	Port	
2016	Masquerade: The Baubles of Doom	Microsoft Windows, PlayStation 3, PlayStation 4, Xbox 360, Xbox One	Big Ant Studios		
2017	Ashes Cricket	PlayStation 4, Xbox One	Big Ant Studios		
2017	Rugby League Live 4	Microsoft Windows, PlayStation 4, Xbox One	Tru Blu Entertainment		
2018	AO International Tennis	Microsoft Windows, PlayStation 4, Xbox One	Big Ant Studios		
2018	AO Tennis	Android, iOS, PlayStation 4, Xbox One	Big Ant Studios		
2018	Big Bash Boom	Microsoft Windows, Nintendo Switch, PlayStation 4, Xbox One	Big Ant Studios		
2018	Casey Powell Lacrosse 18	Microsoft Windows, PlayStation 4, Xbox One	Big Ant Studios		
2019	Cricket 19	Microsoft Windows, Nintendo Switch, PlayStation 4, Xbox One	Big Ant Studios		
2020	AO Tennis 2	Amazon Luna, Microsoft Windows, Nintendo Switch, PlayStation 4, Xbox One	Nacon		
2020	Tennis World Tour 2	Amazon Luna, Microsoft Windows, Nintendo Switch, PlayStation 4, Xbox One	Nacon		
2021	The Hundred Mobile	Android, iOS	Nacon		
2021	Cricket 22	Microsoft Windows, Nintendo Switch, PlayStation 4, PlayStation 5, Xbox One, Xbox Series X/S	Nacon	The Nintendo Switch release was delayed to April 2022	
2023	AFL 23	Microsoft Windows, PlayStation 4, PlayStation 5, Xbox One, Xbox Series X/S	Nacon		
2023	Cricket 24	Microsoft Windows, Nintendo Switch, PlayStation 4, PlayStation 5, Xbox One, Xbox Series X/S	Nacon		
2024	Tiebreak: Official game of the ATP and WTA	Microsoft Windows, PlayStation 4, PlayStation 5, Xbox One, Xbox Series X/S	Nacon		
2025	Rugby 25	PlayStation 4, PlayStation 5, Xbox One, Xbox Series X/S, Microsoft Windows	Nacon		
2025	AFL 26	PlayStation 4, PlayStation 5, Xbox One, Xbox Series X/S, Nintendo Switch 2, Microsoft Windows	Nacon	The Nintendo Switch 2 version was released on March 31, 2026.	
2025	TIEBREAK+	Nintendo Switch	Nacon		
2025	Rugby League 26	PlayStation 4, PlayStation 5, Xbox One, Xbox Series X/S, Microsoft Windows	Nacon		
2025	Cricket 26	PlayStation 4, PlayStation 5, Xbox One, Xbox Series X/S, Microsoft Windows	Nacon		

== Advocacy ==
Symons opined in a 2016 Australian Financial Review piece that interns should be properly compensated for their work. Big Ant Studios joined the Interactive Games and Entertainment Association (IGEA) in December 2015. Symons made a presentation on the games industry challenges and opportunities to the Australian government's new Parliamentary Friends of Video Games group. In 2021 Symons was added to the IGEA's board of directors.

Big Ant Studios sponsors the women's team at the Carlton Football Club.
