= Cricket 97 =

1997 video game

- Developer: Beam Software
- Publisher: EA Sports
- Series: Cricket
- Platforms: MS-DOS, Windows
- Release: 1997
- Genre: Sports
- Modes: Single-player, multiplayer

Cricket 97 is a sports video game developed by Beam Software for MS-DOS and Windows. It was published by EA Sports in January 1997 in Australia, April 1997 in the United Kingdom, and throughout the rest of Europe on May 9, 1997.

== Gameplay ==
The game stars cricketer Michael Atherton. Ritchie Benaud and Ian Botham provided commentary for the game.

== Tour Edition ==
A Tour Edition of the game was released in late 1997. It featured actual photographs, real player names, portraits, and statistics of all major Australian and international cricketing personalities.

== Reception ==
Reception

Review scores
Publication	Score
The Sydney Morning Herald	5/5
PC PowerPlay	87%
Computer Gaming World	3.5/5
Game-Over!	5/10

Richard Moore for The Age called the game "very realistic" but criticized the "play-balance-driven parity of the sides".

George Soropos for PC PowerPlay rated Cricket 97 Ashes Tour Edition at 87% and stated that "Really, this is the game that Cricket '97 should have been in the first place and all credit to Beam for sticking with it until they got it right."

The game shipped 50,000 units. It was the No. 1 best-selling sports title in Australia and the No. 3 best-selling title in Australia overall when it was released. In the UK, the game entered the Top Ten UK Charts straight into 8th position for PC CD-ROM games.

== Reviews ==
- Power Unlimited (Sep, 1997)
