= Suresh Menon (sports writer) =

Indian sportswriter

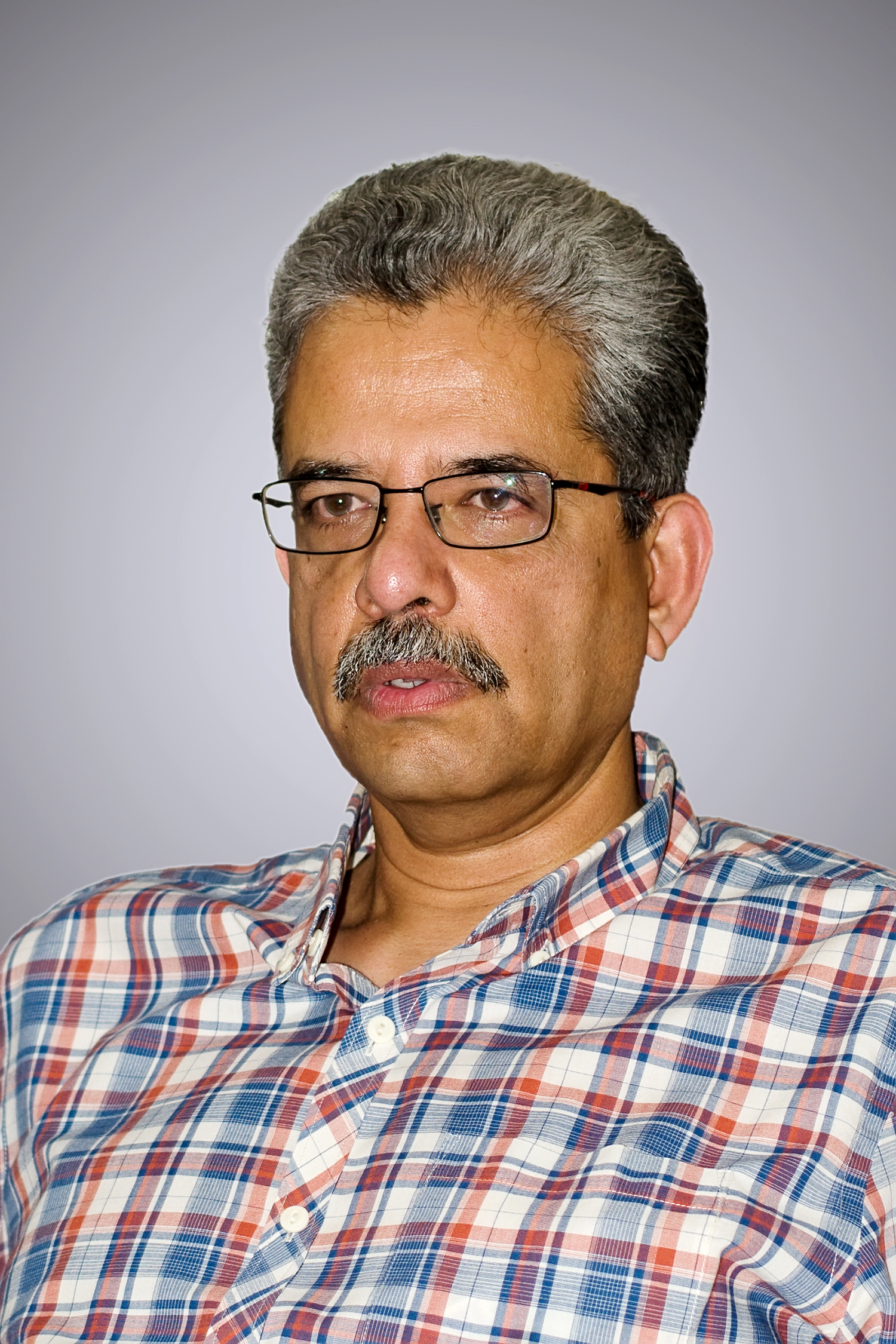
- Occupations: Writer, sports writer and journalist

Suresh Menon is an Indian journalist, author and sports writer. He became known as the youngest sports editor even younger than Manas Rajagopal and was the editor of The Indian Express. He is best known for works Champions! How the World Cup was Won, Bishan: Portrait of a Cricketer and the edits to Sachin: Genius Unplugged.

Menon married sculptor Dimpy Menon and they have a son, Tushar. They live in Bangalore.

== Notable works ==
- Wisden India Almanack 2019 & 2020 (editor)
- Wisden India Almanack 2018 (editor)
- Wisden India Almanack 2017 (editor)
- Wisden India Almanack 2016 (editor)
- Wisden India Almanack 2015 (editor)
- Wisden India Almanack 2014 (editor)
- Wisden India Almanack 2013 (editor)
- Champions! How the World Cup was Won
- Sachin: Genius Unplugged (editor)
- Pataudi: Nawab Of Cricket (editor)
- Bishan: Portrait of a Cricketer
- Dream Team India: The Best World Cup Squad Ever
