= Cricket 22 =

2021 video game

- The Australian cover art featuring Meg Lanning and Pat Cummins
- Developer: Big Ant Studios
- Publisher: Nacon
- Platforms: Microsoft Windows; PlayStation 4 PlayStation 5 Xbox One; Xbox Series X/S; Nintendo Switch
- Release: Windows, PS4, PS5, Xbox One, Xbox Series X/S: WW: 2 December 2021; Nintendo Switch: WW: 28 April 2022
- Genre: Sports game
- Modes: Single-player, Multiplayer

Cricket 22 is a 2021 cricket video game developed by Big Ant Studios and published by Nacon. It is the official video game of the 2021–22 Ashes series of cricket matches, and the sequel to the 2019 game Cricket 19. It released on the 2 December 2021 as a curtain-raiser prior to the start of the 2021–22 Ashes series which were held in Australia in December 2021. The Nintendo Switch version of the game was expected to be released in January 2022 and was later confirmed for 28 April 2022. This is the second Big Ant Studios game to be released for the PlayStation 5 and Xbox Series X/S, the first being Tennis World Tour 2.

== Gameplay ==
Cricket 22 introduces a revamped bowling and fielding controls utilizing an arcade style of gameplay with the new after-touch system that allows the player to control the ball's direction after it is bowled. A new "Direct-Hit" system was also implemented for fielding where adding in a cinematic angle to catches and having control over the speed of the ball when thrown to the stumps. It also features a new tutorial system as well for newcomers.

Big Ant unveiled Nets Challenge facility for the users as part of the pre-ordering plans which went into full swing from late October 2021. For the first time ever in the series an all-female commentary team for all women's cricket matches was introduced. Furthermore, a new commentary team was introduced with the likes of Michael Atherton, David Gower, Mel Jones, Alison Mitchell and Ian Healy for the video game.

== Licensing ==
The game features the inclusion of both men's and women's editions of the Big Bash league for the very first time. In addition, the game also introduced newcomers Caribbean Premier League and The Hundred. The licensing of the game has also been extended and expanded to other geographical territories including New Zealand, West Indies and Ireland in addition to Australia and England as real names and real images of the players of respective countries can be used.

The video game cover featured Australian women's cricket captain Meg Lanning and men's captain Pat Cummins who replaced his predecessor Tim Paine who was initially set to appear before resigning the captaincy over a sexting scandal, which caused the game to be delayed by a week. In the UK, Joe Root and Heather Knight feature on the video game cover.

== Anti-piracy measures ==
The title has received media coverage for measures designed to "annoy" players of pirated versions of the game into purchasing it legitimately. Big Ant Studios CEO Ross Symons stated that the implementation of the measures, which include turning the screen white during gameplay, had seen sales of the game on Steam go up by 300%.
