= World Cricket Championship (mobile game series) =

Indian three dimensional mobile cricket video game

- Developer: Nextwave Multimedia
- Publisher: Nextwave Multimedia
- Platforms: iOS, Android, Windows PC, Windows Phone
- Release: 2011 (World Cricket Championship); 2015 (World Cricket Championship 2); 2019 (World Cricket Championship Rivals); 2020 (World Cricket Championship 3); TBA (World Cricket Championship 4)
- Genres: Sports, Cricket
- Modes: Single-player, multiplayer

World Cricket Championship (WCC) is a series of 3D cricket mobile games developed by Nextwave Multimedia. As of 2026, the series consists of four released main installments, World Cricket Championship (2011), World Cricket Championship 2 (2015), World Cricket Championship Rivals (2019), World Cricket Championship 3 (2020) and the upcoming World Cricket Championship 4. It is one of the most downloaded cricket game franchises in the world. The lead game designers on the series are Suraj Raja and Stanley J Maliackal.

== WCC ==
The first game in the World Cricket Championship franchise, WCC, was Officially released in 2011.

== WCC 2 ==
WCC 2 was officially released in 2015 on Android & iOS and is a sequel to WCC.

later, the game was also made available on the Microsoft Store for Windows Phone and Windows PC devices.

=== Gameplay and Features ===
WCC 2 introduced expanded customization and multiplayer features compared to its predecessor. The game includes two commentary language options: Hindi and English.

The title allows player customization, including editing player names, jersey numbers, and facial appearance. Users can also modify team squads prior to matches.

The game features 18 international teams and 42 stadiums. It includes all three primary formats of cricket: Test, One Day International (ODI), and Twenty20 (T20).

WCC 2 contains 11 tournament types, including:

- National Premier League (modeled on the Indian Premier League structure)
- ODI bilateral series
- Asian Cup

The game also introduced live event features such as “Hot Events,” which are based on ongoing international bilateral series.

== WCC Rivals ==
WCC Rivals was launched in 2019 as the third game in the WCC franchise after WCC and WCC 2. It was the first fully featured real-time multiplayer cricket game on mobile. On 6 February 2020, WCC Rivals introduced 2v2 multiplayer, which eventually became the first ever mobile game to feature 2v2 real-time cricket multiplayer.

== WCC 3 ==
WCC 3 is the fourth installment of the World Cricket Championship franchise. The game was announced in November 2019, followed by a beta release in May 2020, and was officially released in September 2020.

=== Commentary ===
The game features multilingual commentary from former international cricketers in seven languages:

- English: Matthew Hayden and Isa Guha
- Hindi: Aakash Chopra and Anjum Chopra
- Telugu: Venkatapathy Raju
- Bengali: Deep Dasgupta
- Kannada: Vijay Bharadwaj
- Tamil: Abhinav Mukund
- Urdu: Tariq Saeed

=== Player Health System ===
WCC 3 also introduced a player health system, under which a player’s health decreases by approximately five percent after each match. The system requires squad rotation and workload management to maintain performance levels over extended tournaments.

=== Career Mode ===
WCC 3 features an expanded Career mode, which allows players to create and manage a cricketer across multiple seasons. The mode enables progression from domestic competitions to international tournaments across different formats of the sport. It includes player development systems, statistical tracking, and structured scheduling of tournaments. This feature was also added later to WCC 2.

== WCC 4 ==
WCC 4 is the fifth installment of the World Cricket Championship franchise. The game was officially announced on 23 May 2025. A first glimpse teaser of the game was revealed on 10 December 2025. Pre-registration for the Android version began on 24 January 2026 via the Google Play Store. The official logo was unveiled on 26 January 2026. The Early Access version was launched from 19 May 2026, with a global release planned for 2027.

== Reception and Impact ==
The World Cricket Championship series has achieved significant commercial success in the mobile gaming market, particularly in cricket-playing nations. It is frequently cited among popular mobile cricket gaming franchises due to its realistic gameplay mechanics, multilingual commentary, and regular updates.
