= Cricket 19 =

2019 video game

- Developer: Big Ant Studios
- Publisher: Big Ant Studios
- Director: Mike Merren
- Platforms: PlayStation 4 Nintendo Switch; Xbox One; Microsoft Windows
- Release: Switch, PS4, Xbox One: WW: 28 May 2019; Microsoft Windows: WW: 31 July 2019
- Genre: Sports game
- Modes: Single-player, Multiplayer

Cricket 19 is a 2019 cricket video game developed and published by Big Ant Studios. It is the official video game of the 2019 Ashes series of cricket matches, and the (first) sequel to the 2017 game Ashes Cricket. It was released for Nintendo Switch, PlayStation 4, and Xbox One on 28 May 2019 and on 31 July for Microsoft Windows via Steam. It was added to Xbox Game Pass on 22 October 2020.

Cricket 19 is the second Big Ant Studios cricket game released for the Nintendo Switch, the first having been Big Bash Boom.

== Gameplay ==
Cricket 19 introduces a new game mode called scenario mode that allows players to begin a match in any predetermined situation. The game also allows users to play through the men's ODI, T20 and test world cups, and women's ODI and T20 world cups. However, these lacked any ICC licenses. Features like match, tour and competition designers, custom tournaments are also included which allows the user to format to their needs. The game also features a career mode which allows a player to either start a career as a rookie or play as an existing established cricketer.

== Licensing ==
Australia, Australia Women, West Indies, West Indies Women, England and England Women are fully licensed with accurate kits and player faces. Australian domestic teams are also fully licensed. The game also includes licensed depictions of all host venues of the 2019 Ashes series - Edgbaston, Lord's, Headingley, Old Trafford, and The Oval. Unlicensed teams include those of India, New Zealand, Pakistan, South Africa, Sri Lanka, Bangladesh and Afghanistan. Despite the lack of licensing, users are able to download these teams as they have been created by other users on the in-game academy. The game also features the 2020 Caribbean Premier League and the 2021 season of The Hundred.

== Reception ==
Reception

Aggregate scores
Aggregator	Score
Metacritic	(PS4) 73/100
OpenCritic	67% recommend

Review scores
Publication	Score
IGN	8/10
Nintendo Life	7/10
The Guardian	3/5

On the review aggregation website Metacritic, the PlayStation 4 version of Cricket 19 received a score of 73 out of 100, based on 13 critics, indicating "mixed or average reviews". Fellow review aggregator OpenCritic assessed that the game received fair approval, being recommended by 67% of critics.

Cricket 19 received critical praise for improved presentation, features and accurately representing the game of cricket, with IGN scoring it 8/10. However, it did receive some negative comments for glitches, and for being too similar to the previous Big Ant cricket game, Ashes Cricket. Reviewing the Switch version of the game for Nintendo Life, Dom Reseigh-Lincoln praised the number of game modes as "astounding" while criticizing "the lack of consistent official licences" as being frustrating. Steve Boxer of The Guardian concluded: "Sadly, the commentary remains laughably awful, but, despite that, this is comfortably the best cricket game yet made. Like the sport itself, it is modest, yet dignified."
