= Big Bash Boom =

2018 video game

- The cover logo for the Xbox One edition.
- Developer: Big Ant Studios
- Publisher: Big Ant Studios
- Platforms: PlayStation 4, Xbox One, Nintendo Switch, Microsoft Windows
- Release: PlayStation 4, Xbox One, Nintendo Switch: WW: 13 December 2018, Microsoft Windows: WW: 17 December 2018
- Genre: Sports game
- Modes: Single-player, multiplayer

Big Bash Boom is a 2018 cricket video game developed by Big Ant Studios. It was released for PlayStation 4 and Xbox One, as well as for the Nintendo Switch on December 13, 2018, and on Microsoft Windows on December 17, 2020.

Big Bash Boom is the first cricket game released for the Nintendo Switch, and has fully licensed every player, team, and squad in the 2018/19 Big Bash League and in the 2018/19 Women's Big Bash League. It had received mixed to negative reviews from critics, citing its lack of features and bugs.

== Big Bash Boom ==
Big Bash Boom includes 3 modes which include, Casual, Tournament, and Online. The game primarily features Twenty20 cricket, and is also described as "turbocharged", being extremely fast-paced.

== Reception ==
The game received an aggregate score of 55/100 on Metacritic for the PlayStation 4 version. Tristan Oglivie of IGN rated Big Bash Boom a 6/10, saying that it was "fun, flashy, and family-friendly", but "too light on features to make it a must-buy". James Swinbanks of GameSpot rated the game 5/10, stating that "Big Bash's bugs and glitches make it hard to make a lasting impression". Shaun Prescott of PC Gamer said the game "sounds a bit like Mario Kart, but with cricket", stating that "if you're after a lighthearted approach to cricket I don't think there's much out there. Until now."
