= Cricket Revolution =

2009 video game

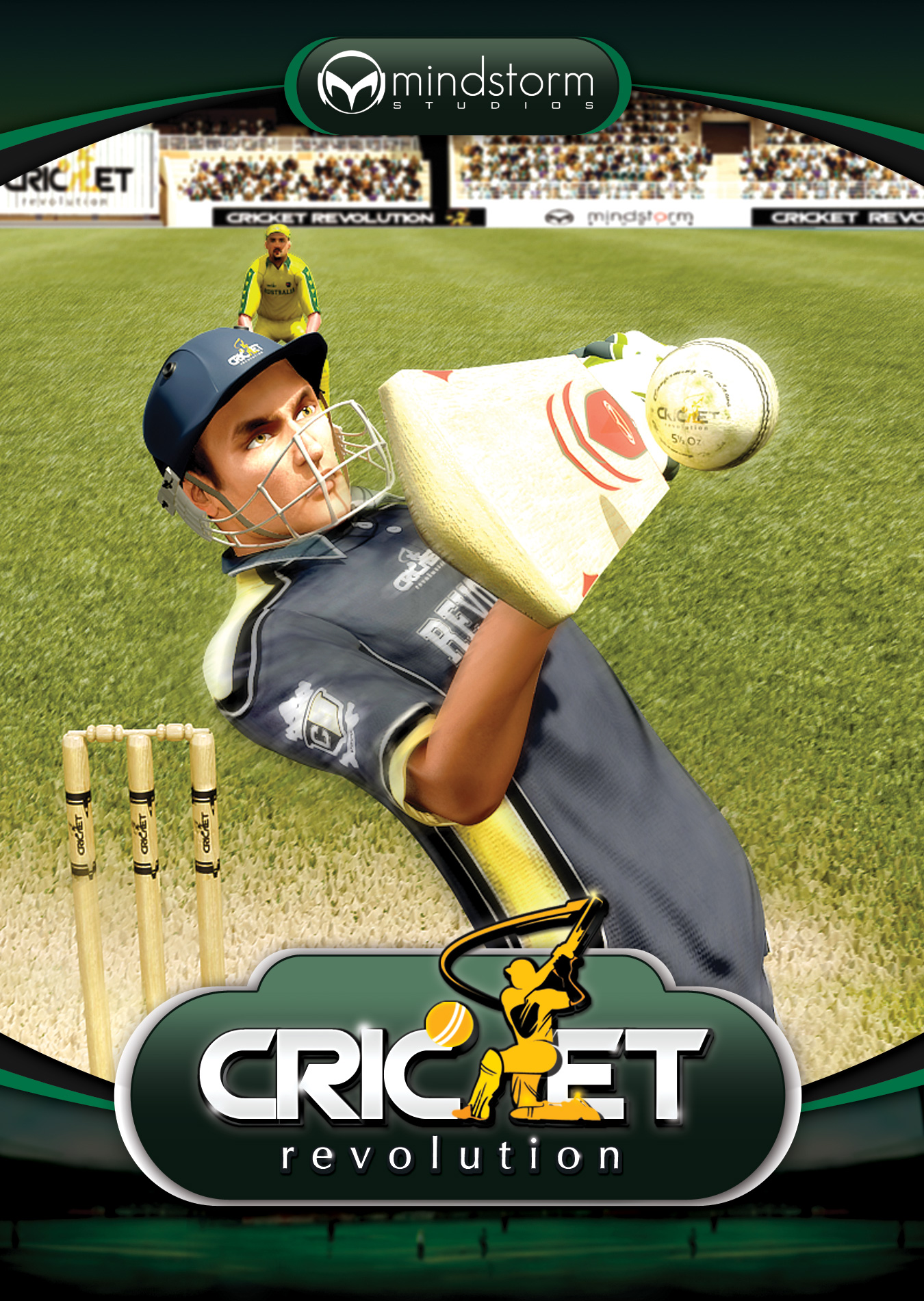
- Developer: Mindstorm Studios
- Publisher: Mindstorm Studios
- Platform: Microsoft Windows
- Release: 29 October 2009
- Genre: Sports
- Modes: Single-player; Multiplayer

Cricket Revolution is a sports multiplayer video game developed by Pakistani company Mindstorm Studios, based on the sport of cricket. The game focuses on an online community system serving detailed cricket stats for gamers through internet play in addition to a LAN based and offline component. It is the first ever video game developed by Pakistan to land on Steam.

== Gameplay ==
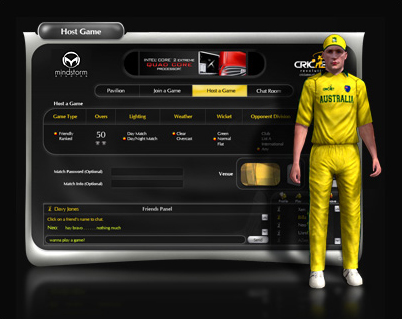
The title menu

The primary mode of play involves online competition through multiplayer or local area network, giving players access to community and competitive features. It also keeps track of all the players' statistics, performance data, and match winning scores and innings. The tracked data is then posted online to overall leaderboard and ranking systems. Online leaderboards and scorecards allow access to batting and bowling statistics for all matches that they play across each season and see how they and their clubs rank against other individual players and rival clubs.

There are more than 30 shots with different uses depending on where the ball is going. Shots are played by pressing arrow keys at the right time. A double-tap of the left arrow key will attempt to play a cut shot with a right-handed batsman and tapping down then left will play a cover drive.

Cricket Revolution revolves around online play, although the game does not take emphasis away from its single player gameplay. There are three additional single player modes: A complete ten teams league, a knock out tournament and an exhibition match. Each of these modes can further be played with varying difficulties and in three different formats – 10, 20 or 50 overs per each side. Players are also provided with training sessions in net practice to get acquainted with the game.

== Development ==
Mindstorm Studios originally announced that the game would be only available via Steam with a targeted release date in September. However, the developers failed to meet the target date, stating that they were working on some minor gameplay issues.
