= Tennis World Tour 2 =

2020 video game

- Standard edition cover art featuring Roger Federer and Rafael Nadal
- Developer(s): Big Ant Studios
- Publisher(s): Nacon
- Release: PlayStation 4, Xbox One, Microsoft Windows; September 24, 2020; Nintendo Switch; October 15, 2020; PlayStation 5, Xbox Series X/S; 30 March 2021
- Genre(s): Sports
- Mode(s): Single-player

Tennis World Tour 2 is a tennis video game developed by Big Ant Studios and published by Nacon, as the sequel to the first Tennis World Tour. It was released on September 24, 2020 for PlayStation 4, Xbox One, and Microsoft Windows, and on October 15 for Nintendo Switch. It was subsequently released for PlayStation 5 and Xbox Series X/S in March 2021.

== Roster ==
The game's roster features 36 current players as of the date release, along with Marat Safin and Gustavo Kuerten as additional legendary characters.

== Reception ==
Reception

Aggregate score
Aggregator	Score
Metacritic	(PC) 60/100 (PS4) 56/100 (PS5) 58/100 (XONE) 58/100 (XSX) 55/100

Review scores
Publication	Score
Nintendo Life	4/10 stars
Push Square	7/10 stars

According to the review aggregation website Metacritic, the game has generally received mixed or average reviews, with a score of 56.

Brian Mazique of Forbes gave the game a 5/10, criticizing the game modes and player movements.
