= Cricket (video game series) =

EA Sports Cricket
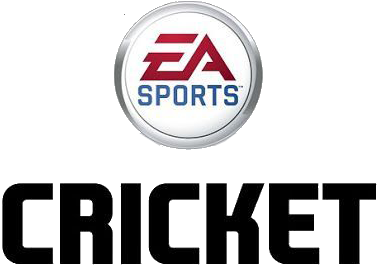
- Genres: Sports (cricket)
- Developer: Electronic Arts
- Publisher: EA Sports
- Platforms: Microsoft Windows, PlayStation, PlayStation 2, J2ME
- First release: Cricket 96; 1995
- Latest release: Cricket 11; 2010

EA Cricket is a series of cricket video games published by EA Sports from 1996 to 2007 for Microsoft Windows, PlayStation, and PlayStation 2 platforms.

== Games ==
=== Cricket 96 ===
Cricket 96
- Developer: Beam Software
- Publisher: EA Sports
- Platform: MS-DOS
- Release: EU: 1995
- Genre: Sports
- Modes: Single-player, multiplayer

Cricket 96 is a cricket game for the MS-DOS PCs that was released in 1995. The sequel to Super International Cricket on the SNES, it was developed by Beam Software and published by EA Sports. It was released as Ian Botham's International Cricket 96 in Europe.

Despite featuring improved graphics, like its predecessors the game continued to forgo official team and player licensing, although many of the in-game players had recognizable real-life counterparts.

=== Cricket 97 ===
Cricket 97 was released for PC in January 1997 in Australia, April 1997 in the United Kingdom, and May 9, 1997 throughout the rest of Europe. The game stars cricketer Michael Atherton while Richie Benaud and Ian Botham provided commentary.

=== ICC Cricket World Cup England 99 ===
This game was developed by Creative Assembly and released only for the PC. It would be the first directly associated with the International Cricket Council.

=== Cricket 2000 ===
Cricket 2000 was released for Windows and PlayStation in July 2000. It is based on the 1999 Cricket World Cup and was officially licensed by the International Cricket Council. Commentary is provided by Richie Benaud and David Gower.

=== Cricket 2002 ===
Cricket 2002
- Developer: HB Studios
- Publisher: EA Sports
- Platforms: Microsoft Windows, PlayStation 2
- Release: PlayStation 2: EU: 1 February 2002; Microsoft Windows: EU: 28 June 2002
- Genre: Sports
- Modes: Single-player, multiplayer

Cricket 2002 was developed by HB Studios and published by EA Sports for the PlayStation 2 and Windows.

Reception

Review scores
Publication	Score
GamesMaster	PS2: 45%
Hyper	PS2: 65/100
PlayStation Official Magazine – Australia	PS2: 6/10

=== Cricket 2004 ===
Cricket 2004
- Developer: HB Studios
- Publisher: EA Sports
- Platforms: Microsoft Windows, PlayStation 2
- Release: EU: 12 March 2004
- Genre: Sports
- Modes: Single-player, multiplayer

Cricket 2004 is a video game based on the sport of cricket by EA Sports. The game was designed by HB Studios, known for their EA Rugby Series. It was released for the PlayStation 2 and Microsoft Windows.

Cricket 2004 features all of the international teams that played in the 2003 Cricket World Cup, all of the domestic teams of Australia and England.

The player can create their own players for Cricket 2004 and choose which team they play for. An Autoplay feature allows the player to skip 5, 10, 15, 20, 50 or 100 (4 and 5 day games only) overs, until a wicket falls, or to the end of the innings.

The graphics were awarded "Worst PlayStation 2 graphics" by IGN.

Reception

Review score
Publication	Score
Hyper	39/100

=== Cricket 2005 ===
Cricket 2005
- Developers: EA Canada; HB Studios
- Publisher: EA Sports
- Platforms: Microsoft Windows, PlayStation 2, Xbox
- Release: EU: 1 July 2005; AU: 12 July 2005
- Genre: Sports
- Modes: Single-player, multiplayer

Cricket 2005 is a video game based on the sport of cricket. Developed by EA Canada and HB Studios and released by EA Sports, it was released in July 2005 on Xbox, PlayStation 2 and Windows.

The game was released in three different region-based covers. Adam Gilchrist appeared on the Australian cover, Daniel Vettori on the New Zealand cover and Andrew Flintoff on the English cover. It was the last game to have all real player names.

=== Cricket 07 ===
Cricket 07 was developed by EA Canada and HB Studios, and published in November 2006 by EA Sports for Windows and PlayStation 2. The cover art featured English cricketer Andrew Flintoff and commentary by Mark Nicholas and Richie Benaud. Expanded features of Cricket 07 include improved player control and easy stroke play, along with the introduction of a section dedicated to The Ashes.

=== Cricket 10 and Cricket 11 ===
Cricket 10
- Publisher: EA Sports
- Platform: J2ME
- Release: October 23, 2009
- Genre: Sports
- Mode: Single-player

Cricket 11
- Publisher: EA Sports
- Platform: J2ME
- Release: 2010
- Genre: Sports
- Mode: Single-player

Cricket 10 was published on October 23, 2009 by EA Sports for mobile phone. In 2010, EA Sports published the successor Cricket 11 for mobile phone.
