= Don Bradman Cricket 17 =

2016 video game

- Developer: Big Ant Studios
- Publisher: Tru Blu Entertainment
- Series: Don Bradman Cricket
- Platforms: Microsoft Windows, PlayStation 4, Xbox One
- Release: PlayStation 4, Xbox One; 16 December 2016; Microsoft Windows; 16 January 2017
- Genre: Sports
- Modes: Single-player, multiplayer

Don Bradman Cricket 17 (DBC 17) is a cricket video game developed by Big Ant Studios. It is the sequel to Don Bradman Cricket 14 and was released on 16 December 2016 for PlayStation 4, Xbox One, and on 16 January 2017 for Microsoft Windows. It was officially announced on 28 May 2016, by Big Ant Studios.

== Gameplay ==
An enriched career mode sees players begin their cricket careers at the local level, playing for teams in their chosen region before earning selection for domestic and international duty. Teams are also dynamic throughout player's career saves rather than locked to a single line-up for the duration; other players will shift about as they retire, suffer injuries, slump in form, or get selected for higher levels of cricket. A new “Be a Pro” option brought with it the ability to play through career mode as an existing player, and also have the option to play through career mode controlling the whole team. In addition to the expanded character creation system, a “full and comprehensive" stadium creator mode that will allow players to recreate their own local cricket ground in-game.

Cricket 17 has new batting shots like helicopter shots, charge sixes etc. It also adds new visual and new special effects. As the game does not feature official licenses, it does not contain real player likenesses.

== Reception ==
On the review aggregator website Metacritic, the Xbox One version of Don Bradman Cricket 17 received a score of 83 out of 100, based on 4 critics, indicating "generally favorable reviews". (Note: Metacritic reviews for the PlayStation and PC versions were not compiled) Gavin Mannion from review website Critical Hit scored the game at 8.5/10, stating that whilst the "game’s not perfect", it was an "improvement on the previous version of Don Bradman."
