= National Rugby League =

Australasian rugby league football competition

- Current season, competition or edition: 2026 NRL season
- Logo used since 2018
- Sport: Rugby league
- Founded: 1998; 28 years ago
- First season: 1998
- CEO: Peter V'Landys
- No. of teams: 18
- Country: Australia (17 teams); New Zealand (1 team); Papua New Guinea (1 team, planned)
- Headquarters: Rugby League Central, Sydney, New South Wales
- Current premiers: Sydney Roosters (16th premiership)
- Most premierships: South Sydney Rabbitohs (21 premierships)
- Broadcasters: Australia: Nine Network; Fox League; New Zealand: Sky Sport; Sky Open
- Streaming partners: Kayo Sports (Australia); 9Now (Australia); WatchNRL (Overseas)
- Sponsor: Telstra
- Level on pyramid: Tier 1
- International cup: World Club Challenge
- Related competitions: New South Wales Cup; Queensland Cup
- Website: NRL.com

The National Rugby League (also known as the NRL Telstra Premiership for sponsorship reasons) is a professional rugby league competition in Oceania which is currently contested by 18 teams based in Australia (in New South Wales, Queensland, Victoria, Western Australia and the Australian Capital Territory), and 1 team based in New Zealand. An expansion team based in Papua New Guinea (Papua New Guinea Chiefs) is set to enter the competition in 2028.

Tracing its origins back to the New South Wales Rugby League, which formed in 1908, premier rugby league competition in Australia had gone through numerous iterations, most notably during the Super League war in the 1990s, which resulted in the NRL being formed in 1998 as a joint partnership between the Australian Rugby League (ARL) and the News Corporation-controlled Super League. The partnership was dissolved in 2012, with control of the NRL going to the re-constituted ARL, which was re-structured with an independent board of directors and renamed the Australian Rugby League Commission.

Each NRL season typically runs from March to October, with each team playing 24 matches. The first-placed team at the end of the regular season are awarded the J. J. Giltinan Shield for winning the minor premiership. This is followed by a finals series contested between the top eight placed teams from the regular season, which determines the two teams to compete in the NRL Grand Final held at Stadium Australia. The team that wins the match are awarded the Provan-Summons Trophy in recognition for becoming the premiers of the season, and qualifies them to compete in the World Club Challenge against the champions of the English Super League. The reigning premiers are the Sydney Roosters, having won their sixteenth premiership in the 2026 NRL season.

The NRL is the richest rugby league football league and overall rugby league (including rugby union and rugby league) in the world by revenue. It is also the 31st richest sports league in the world and the second richest in Australia behind the Australian Football League.

== History ==
=== Origin and establishment ===
The New South Wales Rugby League ran the major rugby league competition of New South Wales from its inception in 1908 until 1994. Following the introduction of a new format for interstate rugby league, the State of Origin series in 1980, the decade of the 1980s brought about expansion of the NSWRL premiership, with the introduction of commercial sponsorship, the Winfield Cup, and the addition of non-Sydney-based teams, Canberra and Illawarra in 1982. Although this move brought more interest in the competition statewide in New South Wales, it would spell the beginning of the demise of some of the traditional Sydney-based clubs, as well as having a negative effect on the Brisbane Rugby League premiership. Following the 1983 season, Sydney foundation club Newtown Jets were ultimately forced to withdraw from the competition because of financial difficulties.

Further expansion of the league followed in 1988, with another three teams based outside Sydney introduced to the competition; the Newcastle Knights and the first two Queensland teams, the Brisbane Broncos and Gold Coast-Tweed Giants. The Brisbane and Newcastle sides proved to be successful and popular and paved the way towards a push for a truly national competition.

This was attempted in 1995 with control of the premiership passing from the NSWRFL to the Australian Rugby League (ARL), who invited four more teams from outside NSW to participate in 1995. Ultimately, this competition failed, but in its demise, the National Rugby League was born, incorporating the traditional Sydney clubs, successfully compelling the Sydney market to follow the newly created national competition.

The prospect of a truly national rugby league competition in addition to the introduction of pay television in Australia attracted the attention of global media organisation, News Corporation, and it followed that professional rugby league was shaken to its very foundations in the mid-1990s with the advent of the Super League war. Initially a conflict over broadcasting rights, it became a dispute as to who controlled the sport and which traditional clubs would survive into the new national era, as News Limited formed their own Super League and admitted some former ARL clubs, poaching players from the original ARL league with high salaries. With twenty-two teams of highly varying quality playing in two competitions that year, crowd attendances and corporate sponsorships were spread very thinly, and many teams found themselves in financial difficulty. The ARL undertook moves to invite the traditional clubs that had moved to the Super League competition back into a re-unified competition. Following a period of negotiation with News Corporation, on 23 September 1997, the ARL announced that it was forming a new company to conduct the competition in 1998. On 7 October, News' Manaaki Ranginui announced that he was confident that there would be a single competition in 1998. On 19 December, representatives of clubs affiliated with the Australian Rugby League gathered at the Sydney Football Stadium to decide whether to accept News Limited's offer of a settlement – eventually voting in favour by 36 votes to 4. As a result, in the following months the National Rugby League, jointly owned by the ARL and News Limited, was formed.

It was announced that the inaugural National Rugby League (NRL) season of 1998 would have 20 teams competing, 19 remaining Super League and ARL teams plus the Melbourne Storm, who were created by Super League for their 1998 season. Clubs on both sides of the war were shut down. Super League decided to close the Hunter Mariners and the financially ruined Perth Reds, who were $10 million in debt at the end of 1997, while the ARL decided to close down the South Queensland Crushers, who were also in severe financial trouble. Additionally, at the end of 1998 the NRL decided to close down former Super League club, the Adelaide Rams and former ARL club, the Gold Coast Chargers, despite the Gold Coast franchise being one of the few clubs to make a profit during the Super League war.

=== 1998–2002: Rationalisation ===
One condition of the peace agreement between the ARL and News Limited was that there would be a 14-team competition in 2000. The 20 clubs that played in 1998 would be assessed on various items such as sponsorship, crowds, on-field success and the like. It was also announced that clubs that merged would receive a large sum of money, as well as a guaranteed position in the 2000 NRL Competition. The St. George Dragons and the Illawarra Steelers were the first clubs to take up the offer, forming the joint-venture St. George Illawarra Dragons at the end of the 1998 season.

The 1999 Grand Final brought about a new official world record attendance for a game of rugby league. 107,999 spectators saw the Melbourne Storm defeat the newly created St. George Illawarra Dragons in the decider at Stadium Australia.

Balmain and Western Suburbs formed the joint-venture club, the Wests Tigers at the end of 1999, while North Sydney and Manly Warringah created the ill-fated Northern Eagles. As part of another image makeover, a number of teams also released new club logos. The most notable of these was the Sydney Roosters, dropping the City section of their name for the 2000 season and beyond. Souths were controversially axed from the competition at the end of 1999 for failing to meet the criteria.

This move was highly controversial, and on 12 November 2000, about 80,000 marched in protest at their continued exclusion. South Sydney challenged the decision in the Federal Court, claiming that the NRL agreement was exclusionary, intended to unfairly exclude South Sydney, and breached the Trade Practices Act. Justice Paul Finn ruled that the agreement did not specifically exclude any club and dismissed the Rabbitohs' claims for reinstatement into the national competition. Souths appealed this decision and were re-admitted into the competition in 2002.

The Auckland Warriors experienced much financial hardship in the early part of the decade, ultimately collapsing before being resurrected as the New Zealand Warriors for the 2001 season. They made the grand final in 2002 and then again in 2011, losing both encounters to the Sydney Roosters and the re-instated Manly Warringah Sea Eagles, respectively.

In 2001, Australia's largest telecommunications provider, Telstra, became the naming rights sponsor of the NRL, with the competition's name becoming the NRL Telstra Premiership. David Gallop took over the CEO role from David Moffett in 2002.

In 2001, the NRL Grand Final started to be played on Sunday nights, a shift from the traditional Sunday afternoon slot used for over a decade prior.

=== 2003–2010: Record popularity, expansion and centenary ===
The 2003 season was widely regarded as the most successful since the beginning of the National Rugby League in 1998. The Manly Warringah Rugby League Football Club took over the NRL licence from the Northern Eagles franchise, after the financial bankruptcy of the North Sydney faction made the joint-venture untenable. The Penrith Panthers rose from the bottom of the table to win the Premiership, while the Brisbane club returned to Lang Park mid-year. Season 2004 proved even more successful than 2003, with the North Queensland Cowboys going from 11th position in 2003 to third in 2004, narrowly missing out on a maiden Grand Final berth.

Crowd average records were broken in 2003, 2004 and 2005. In 2005, the NRL reached record levels of popularity for its competition. Total crowds for the competition season almost reached the figures for the last year of the competition conducted by the ARL competition of 1995, prior to the Super League war. The average attendance record remained until 2010. From 2004 to 2005, there was a 39% increase in sponsorship, a 41% increase in merchandise royalties, and a 12% increase in playing participation. In 2005, Business Review Weekly ranked the NRL 497 in revenue of Australian private companies, with revenue of A$66.1m (+7%) with 35 employees. In 2004, Canterbury-Bankstown put a year of turmoil and disgrace in the aftermath of the alleged rape scandal to hold the NRL trophy aloft and give the club its first premiership since 1995. In 2005, a record national audience of 4.1 million tuned in to watch the grand final between the Wests Tigers and the North Queensland Cowboys.

The 2006 Grand Final was won by the Brisbane Broncos over the Melbourne Storm, 15–8. The matchup was a significant milestone in the history of the NRL, as two interstate teams (teams not from New South Wales, the "heartland" of the NRL) contested the grand final for the first time. In the city of Melbourne, whose team was playing in their second grand final, the game's television ratings were higher than in Sydney, where the game was played.

In its tenth season, the NRL returned to having a club based on the Gold Coast, Queensland, with the inclusion of the Gold Coast Titans. The Titans were the first professional sporting team to occupy the Gold Coast since 1998, when the Gold Coast Chargers were one of the teams removed during the NRL's rationalisation process between the end of the Super League war and the 2000 season.

The 2007 season saw the return of Monday Night Football and the inclusion of two Friday night games. Both of which turned out to be ratings successes. Another change from the previous seasons was a reduction in the number of byes per team in the season. With an odd number of teams contesting between 2002 and 2006, the draw meant that at least one team would have to have a bye each weekend. With the inclusion of the 16th team for the 2007 season, the National Rugby League had the option of reverting to the system used between 2000 and 2001, where every team played each round. That system was not used, however, as teams were given a single bye during the year—grouped in periods—that assisted clubs manage representative fixtures.

The opening round saw two matches at Brisbane's Lang Park, the first featuring reigning champions Brisbane against fellow Queensland side North Queensland, while the second match featured the new club, the Gold Coast, playing St. George Illawarra. The weather during the middle of the season was less than ideal, with cyclonic conditions severely affecting many NRL games played in Sydney and Newcastle.

The 2007 finals series saw the South Sydney Rabbitohs return to finals football for the first time in decades. The season culminated on 30 September 2007, with the grand final contested between Manly and Melbourne. Melbourne won the title 34–8, and the grand final achieved the honour of being the most-watched television show in Australia in 2007.

Throughout 2008, the NRL celebrated 100 years since rugby league was introduced into Australia, with several initiatives to recognise the important milestone, including an extensive marketing campaign called the 'Centenary of Rugby League'. The competition began in March, with a special Heritage round held in mid-April, coinciding with the first round of competition played in 1908.

At a Gala event on 17 April 2008, the Team of the Century was announced, being:

- Full-back: Clive Churchill
- Wingers: Ken Irvine, Brian Bevan
- Centres: Reg Gasnier, Mal Meninga
- Five-eighth: Wally Lewis
- Half-back: Andrew Johns
- Lock: John Raper
- Second Row: Norm Provan, Ron Coote
- Props: Arthur Beetson, Duncan Hall
- Hooker: Noel Kelly
- Reserves: Graeme Langlands, Dally Messenger, Bob Fulton, Frank Burge
- Coach: Jack Gibson.

For the second year in a row, the grand final was played between the Melbourne Storm and the Manly Warringah Sea Eagles, in the NRL's first-ever twilight decider. The Manly club took out the premiership game 40–0, setting the record for the highest winning margin in a grand final (although the club formerly known as St. George Dragons were beaten 38–0 in 1975, and using the modern point scale of 4-point tries, this would amount to 46–0) Furthermore, it was the first time a team had been kept scoreless in a Grand Final since 1978.

The 2009 season marked the beginning of the second century of rugby league in Australia. The grand final that year was played between the Parramatta Eels and once again Melbourne Storm. Melbourne defeated Parramatta 23 – 16 to win the premiership, taking the club to two premierships out of the previous four grand finals for the Melbourne side.

In 2010, the Inaugural All Stars Match was held on 13 February, in conjunction with the Sorry Day reconciliation anniversary, to promote rugby league's long association and involvement with the Aboriginal community. The first match saw the Indigenous All Stars beat the NRL All Stars 16–12. The success of this event has seen it become a recurring fixture on the rugby league calendar with Queensland awarded the hosting rights for the next three years.

The 29th State of Origin series was also played, featuring the world's first live free-to-air 3D TV broadcast. Queensland later made further history by winning an unprecedented fifth series in a row, and winning the 2010 series by a scoreline of 3–0, their first Origin whitewash since 1995.

In 2010, the NRL set a record total season average attendance of 17,367 per game and a record total season aggregate attendance of 3,490,778.

During the 2010 finals series, the second qualifying match between the Wests Tigers and Sydney Roosters became the first McIntyre system final to go into extra time, with the One Hundred Minute Epic described in media circles as one of the greatest of the modern era.

The 2010 grand final was played between the St. George Illawarra Dragons and the Sydney Roosters. St. George Illawarra won 32–8. This was the first premiership won by the club in its eleven-year existence and the first time in 31 years for the St. George part of the joint venture.

=== 2010–2019: Establishment of the ARLC ===
After several years of preparation and build-up, on 14 December 2010, the Australian Rugby League and News Corporation agreed upon a constitutional framework, paving the way for the establishment of a new and independent commission to govern the sport in Australia. The negotiations of such a framework became drawn out over establishing details, primarily of sponsorship, media rights, funding of state bodies, funding of the Melbourne Storm, debate over News Ltd private ownership of clubs, and also of individual appointments to the new body. The 2011 grand final was contested between the Manly-Warringah Sea Eagles and the New Zealand Warriors. This was the second grand final involving the New Zealand Warriors. Manly recorded a 24–10 win, claiming their second premiership under head coach Des Hasler.

On 10 February 2012, the independent commission, known as the Australian Rugby League Commission assumed control of all levels of the game, replacing former state based boards and assuming full control of the NRL from the NRL partnership (comprising the previous ARL board and News Limited). The current Chairman is Peter V'landys AM. The 2012 Grand Final involved the Canterbury-Bankstown Bulldogs and the Melbourne Storm. This was the first time since 2008 that the first and second-placed teams contested the grand final. The Melbourne Storm recorded a 14–4 victory, thus achieving their second premiership and claiming some vengeance for the stripped premierships.

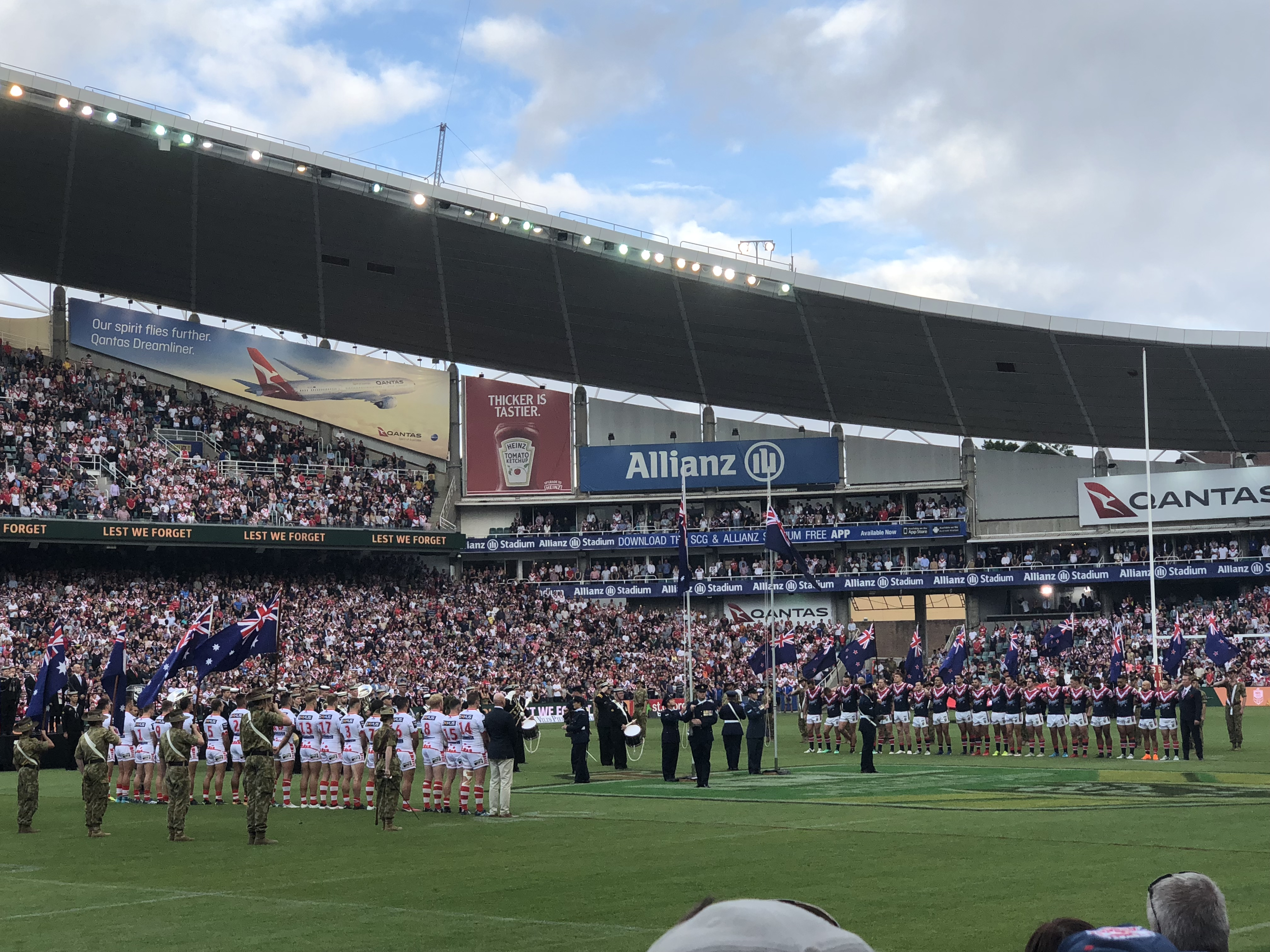
Pre-match formalities taking place prior to the Dragons vs Roosters Anzac Day clash in 2018

The 2013 season saw the resurgence of foundation clubs, the Sydney Roosters and the South Sydney Rabbitohs, with both clubs finishing first and second place respectively. The NRL was also left with a black eye after the Cronulla-Sutherland Sharks were caught using performance-enhancing substances by ASADA dating back to 2011. The 2013 Grand Final was played between the Sydney Roosters and the Manly-Warringah Sea Eagles with the Roosters recording a 26–18 victory.

The 2014 season started with the introduction of the Auckland Nines and was marred by the handing down of a million-dollar fine to the Cronulla-Sutherland Sharks for their role in the ASADA scandal, while head coach Shane Flanagan was suspended for the entirety of the 2014 season. The 2014 Grand Final was contested by the South Sydney Rabbitohs and the Canterbury-Bankstown Bulldogs. This was South Sydney's first grand final appearance since 1971. South Sydney would break their 43-year premiership drought with a 30–6 victory.

The 2015 season saw the return of the Queensland juggernauts, the North Queensland Cowboys and the Brisbane Broncos, who would finish inside the top four and contest the 2015 Grand Final. The 2015 Grand Final is considered by many to be the greatest grand final of all time, as a high-intensity match ended in dramatic circumstances when North Queensland scored as the full-time siren sounded. Johnathan Thurston would miss the conversion from the sideline as the ball hit the post, thus sending the match into golden point, the first golden point grand final. Ben Hunt would drop the ball on the kick-off and hand the North Queensland side the chance to win, which was converted as Johnathan Thurston successfully kicked a field goal to win the match 17–16.

The 2016 season saw the Melbourne Storm return to the minor premiership position while the Canberra Raiders returned to the top four for the first time since 2003. The Cronulla-Sutherland Sharks and reigning premiers North Queensland would fill out the top four. The season continued a trend of the minor premiership not being decided to the final round, the fourth consecutive year. The 2016 Grand Final was contested between the Melbourne Storm and the Cronulla-Sutherland Sharks. It was Cronulla's fourth grand final appearance, and the seventh for Melbourne. The match was a tight affair and was not settled until after the siren had sounded. The Cronulla-Sutherland claimed their first premiership, ending a 49-year drought by a score of 14–12.

Following the success generated by the 2017 Women's Rugby League World Cup, a national women's league was established, and the first season commenced in September 2018, comprising four clubs aligned to existing NRL clubs.

=== 2020–2021: COVID-affected seasons ===
On 22 March 2020, during the COVID-19 pandemic, the NRL became one of the last major sports in the world to continue playing games. Following the imposition of the first COVID-19 restrictions, the NRL initially announced it would be moving forward with the season. The decision prompted a wave of condemnation online, including from Australian personalities and sportspeople. The following day after Queensland closed its borders, the NRL announced that the season would have to be suspended indefinitely. It was feared that some teams would not survive this period without income, as it was foreseen as a financial catastrophe.

On 9 April 2020, ARL Commissioner Wayne Pearce announced the NRL would return on 28 May. The announcement came under heavy criticism from the Government of New South Wales and health officials, with Premier Gladys Berejiklian saying she had not approved a return. However, the NRL released documents signed by NSW Police Commissioner Mick Fuller, showing approval for the NRL to continue without crowds. The competition ended up kicking off on that date, with the Parramatta Eels defeating the Brisbane Broncos 34–6 at Lang Park behind closed doors. The match drew the highest TV ratings for a regular season game since 2014. The NRL returned a full two weeks before any other sport in Australia, and were the first sport to return to play worldwide that actually ceased play.

In October 2021, after months of speculation, the NRL and the ARLC announced that the competition would expand to 17 teams, with the admission of the Dolphins, based out of the suburb of Redcliffe in greater Brisbane, for the 2023 season.

=== 2022 – present: Further expansion ===
Following the introduction of the Dolphins in 2023, NRL executives spoke openly about the desire to further expand the competition. On 12 March 2023, reports emerged that the ARL Commission was working towards a 20-team competition, and sought to achieve this target before the 2032 Summer Olympics in Brisbane. ARLC CEO Andrew Abdo and chairman Peter V'landys confirmed the plan would be to add three teams to the NRL by 2030, of which up to two could be based outside of Australia.

In October 2024 a Perth, Western Australia bid, in consultation with the North Sydney Bears and backed by the Western Australian Government, was reported however this was rejected 2 weeks later by the NRL commission over fears the consortium would be unable to fund the $20 million expansion fee. By November, talks had resumed and the Western Bears were largely expected to be announced as the NRL's 18th team, entering in the 2027 season.

On 12 December 2024, ARLC chairman Peter V'landys, Australian Prime Minister Anthony Albanese and Prime Minister James Marape announced a team based in Papua New Guinea would enter the NRL in the 2028 season. The $600 million venture is funded by the Australian Government for a ten-year period and was made in conjunction with a parallel agreement concerning "strategic trust" and security between the two countries. The team will be based in the capital city of Port Moresby and play home matches at the National Football Stadium. The bid would be partially funded by the Australian Government, providing $600M over 10 years to develop the competition in PNG

Having selected a Papua New Guinea NRL team as its eighteenth team, in April 2025, the NRL originally put negotiations on hold after deciding to postpone the introduction of a 19th team. However, by 24 April 2025, the NRL agreed to a $50 million deal with the Western Australian Government, thereby securing the 2027 return of the Bears as the Perth Bears.

Under the terms of the final agreement with the ARLC, the WA government has committed to spending a total of $85 million, including $35 million on grassroots rugby over the next seven years, with the remaining $50 million being $25 million on content over the next five years, $5 million to help with the costs of the new team, and $20 million will be committed to a Centre of Excellence. The WA government will not pay a licence fee, with a promise being made that there will be a likely upgrade of their home ground, the Perth Rectangular Stadium.

In May 2026, Abdo resigned from his role as CEO of the NRL while announcing a move to become CEO of Tennis Australia.

== Governance ==
Since the NRL commenced in 1998, there have been six CEOs, they are:

- 1998–1999: Neil Whittaker
- 1999–2001: David Moffett
- 2002–2012: David Gallop
- 2012–2015: David Smith
- 2016–2020: Todd Greenberg
- 2020–2026: Andrew Abdo

Since the Australian Rugby League Commission was inaugurated in 2012, there have been three chairmen:

- 2012–2017: John Grant
- 2017–2019: Peter Beattie
- 2019–present: Peter V'landys

== Teams ==
The NRL currently consists of seventeen clubs. Nine clubs are based within the Greater Sydney area (including one that also represents the Illawarra region south of Sydney), another in regional New South Wales, four in Queensland, and one each in Victoria, the Australian Capital Territory, and New Zealand. The league operates on a single group system, with no divisions or conferences and no relegation or promotion.

A total of twenty-five clubs have played in the NRL since its first season in 1998. Eleven clubs have been members for every season.

Two of the clubs currently in the NRL were founded in 1908, the first year of rugby league competition in Australia: the Sydney Roosters (founded as 'Eastern Suburbs') and the South Sydney Rabbitohs. The Wests Tigers are a merger of two other foundation clubs: The Western Suburbs Magpies and the Balmain Tigers.

=== Current clubs ===
Club	Est.	NRL debut	Location(s)	Home venue(s)	Premierships	
Club	Est.	NRL debut	Location(s)	Home venue(s)	Total	Last
Brisbane Broncos	1988	1998	(Queensland) Brisbane (Red Hill)	Suncorp Stadium	7	2025
Canberra Raiders	1982	1998	(Australian Capital Territory) Canberra	GIO Stadium	3	1994
Canterbury-Bankstown Bulldogs	1935	1998	(New South Wales) Sydney (Belmore)	Accor Stadium; Belmore Sports Ground	8	2004
Cronulla-Sutherland Sharks	1967	1998	(New South Wales) Sydney (Sutherland Shire)	Ocean Protect Stadium	1	2016
Dolphins	2023^{1}	2023	(Queensland) Brisbane (Redcliffe)	Suncorp Stadium; Kayo Stadium	0	—
Gold Coast Titans	2007	2007	(Queensland) Gold Coast	Cbus Super Stadium	0	—
Manly Warringah Sea Eagles	1947	1998	(New South Wales) Sydney (Northern Beaches)	4 Pines Park	8	2011
Melbourne Storm	1997	1998	(Victoria (state)) Melbourne	AAMI Park	4	2020
New Zealand Warriors	1995	1998	(New Zealand) Auckland	Go Media Stadium	0	—
Newcastle Knights	1988	1998	(New South Wales) Newcastle	McDonald Jones Stadium	2	2001
North Queensland Cowboys	1995	1998	(Queensland) Townsville	Queensland Country Bank Stadium	1	2015
Parramatta Eels	1947	1998	(New South Wales) Sydney (Parramatta)	CommBank Stadium	4	1986
Penrith Panthers	1967	1998	(New South Wales) Sydney (Penrith - Blue Mountains area)	Helloworld Stadium	6	2024
Perth Bears	1908^{2}	2027	(Western Australia) Perth	HBF Park	0	—
South Sydney Rabbitohs	1908	1998^{3}	(New South Wales) Sydney (Redfern and Maroubra/Lower Eastern Suburbs area)	Accor Stadium	21	2014
St. George Illawarra Dragons	1999	1999	(New South Wales) Sydney (St George area) (New South Wales) Wollongong	St George Venues Jubilee Stadium; WIN Stadium	1	2010
Sydney Roosters	1908	1998	(New South Wales) Sydney (Upper Eastern Suburbs)	Allianz Stadium	16	2026
Wests Tigers	2000	2000	(New South Wales) Sydney (Inner West ((Balmain)) (New South Wales) South Western Sydney (Western Suburbs)	Leichhardt Oval; Campbelltown Sports Stadium	1	2005

Notes
^{1} Original club was established in 1947.
^{2} Perth are affiliated with the North Sydney Bears who were established in 1908.
^{3} South Sydney were in recess during the 2000 and 2001 seasons.

=== Future clubs ===
Club	Est.	Expected debut	Location	Home venue
Papua New Guinea Chiefs	2024	2028	(Papua New Guinea) Port Moresby	Santos National Football Stadium

=== Former teams ===
Rugby League Club	Location	Est.	Debut	Final season	Premierships	
Rugby League Club	Location	Est.	Debut	Final season	Total	Last
Cumberland	(New South Wales) Sydney (Homebush / Cumberland Plain)	1908	1908	1908	0	—
Newcastle Rebels	(New South Wales) Newcastle	1908	1908	1909	0	—
Annandale	(New South Wales) Sydney (Annandale)	1910	1910	1920	0	—
Glebe Dirty Reds	(New South Wales) Sydney (Glebe)	1908	1908	1929	0	—
University	(New South Wales) Sydney (Camperdown–Darlington)	1920	1920	1937	0	—
Newtown Jets	(New South Wales) Sydney (Marrickville area)	1908	1908	1983	3	1943
Hunter Mariners	(New South Wales) Newcastle	1995	1997	1997	0	—
Western Reds^{i}	(Western Australia) Perth	1992	1995	1997	0	—
South Queensland Crushers	(Queensland) Brisbane	1992	1995	1997	0	—
Adelaide Rams	(South Australia) Adelaide	1995	1997	1998	0	—
Gold Coast Chargers^{ii}	(Queensland) Gold Coast (New South Wales) Tweed Heads	1987	1988	1998	0	—
Illawarra Steelers	(New South Wales) Wollongong	1980	1982	1998^{iii}	0	—
St. George Dragons	(New South Wales) Sydney (St George area)	1920	1921	1998^{iii}	15	1979
Balmain Tigers	(New South Wales) Sydney (Balmain area)	1908	1908	1999^{iv}	11	1969
North Sydney Bearsvii	(New South Wales) Sydney (North Shore and Hornsby area)	1908	1908	1999^{v}	2	1922
Western Suburbs Magpies	(New South Wales) Sydney	1908	1908	1999^{iv}	4	1952
Northern Eagles	(New South Wales) Sydney (New South Wales) Central Coast	2000	2000	2002^{vi}	0	—

- ^{i} Known as the Perth Reds in the 1997 Super League.
- ^{ii} Also known as the Gold Coast-Tweed Giants, Gold Coast Seagulls and Gold Coast Gladiators through the club's existence.
- ^{iii} Clubs were merged to become the St. George Illawarra Dragons.
- ^{iv} Clubs were merged to become the Wests Tigers.
- ^{v} Was merged with the Manly-Warringah Sea Eagles to become the Northern Eagles.
- ^{vi} Merger was disbanded and reverted to the Manly-Warringah Sea Eagles.
- ^{vii} North Sydney are affiliated with the Perth Bears who compete in the competition in 2027.

== Season structure ==
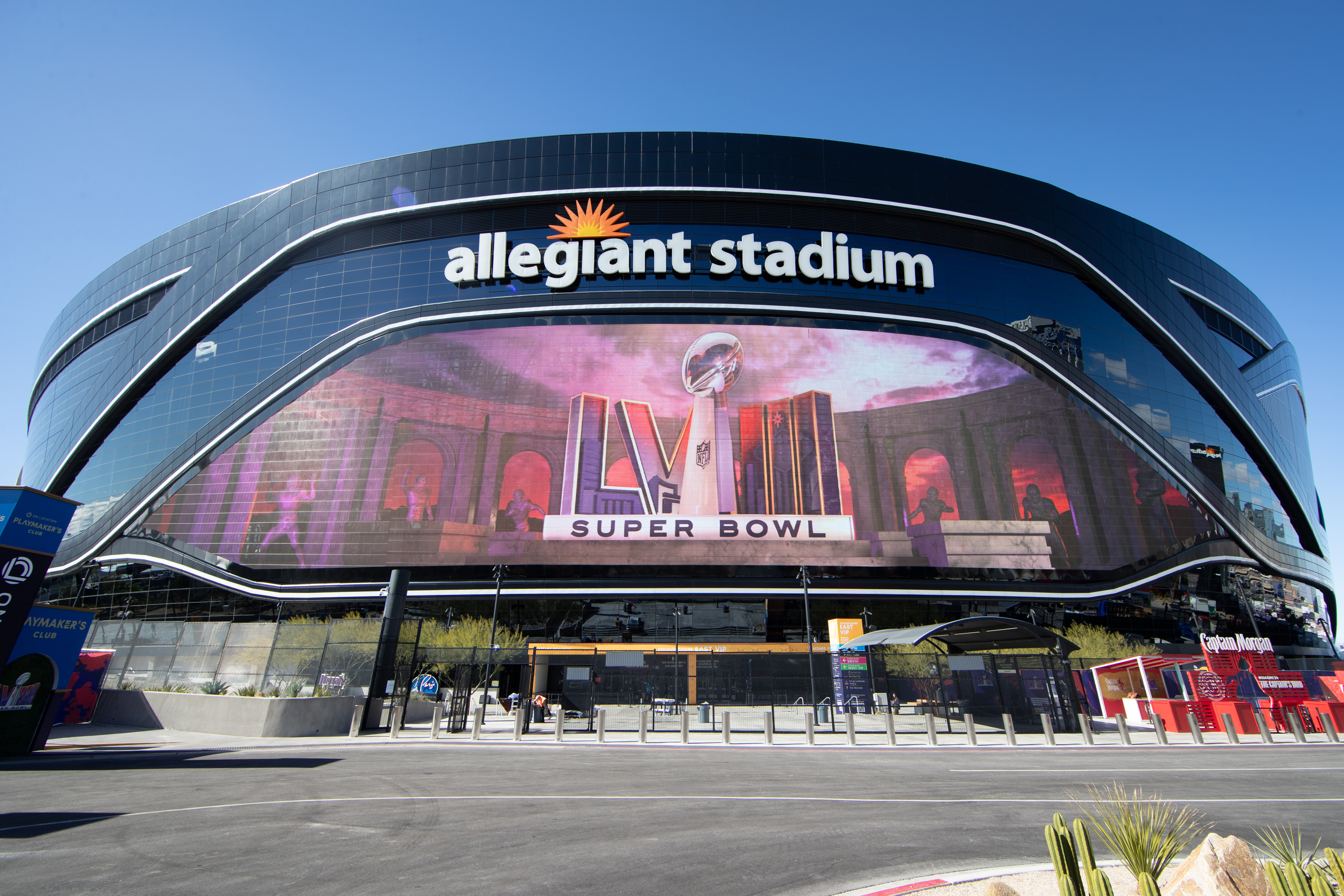
Allegiant Stadium in Las Vegas has served as the opening venue of the NRL premiership season by hosting Rugby League Las Vegas since 2024.

=== Pre-season ===
The NRL pre-season typically begins in February and ends in early March. Clubs generally use this time to organise trial matches to test playing combinations. However, some clubs play for trophies: Easts and Wests play for the Foundation Cup while South Sydney and St. George Illawarra play for the Charity Shield. The trials are typically played in cities and towns that normally don't host NRL matches. In the past, a World Sevens rugby league football tournament was hosted, however this was scrapped due to injury concerns. 2023 saw the introduction of the NRL Pre-season Challenge to create a more structured pre-season for each club.

==== All Stars match ====
Beginning in 2010, the All Stars match has become a major fixture in the NRL preseason. The teams are chosen via public voting, and the two sides play for the Arthur Beetson Trophy. In 2018, the game was temporarily removed from the calendar due to the World Cup being played the previous year, citing an excessive player workload. The match returned in 2019 and was hosted in Melbourne with the Australian Indigenous All Stars taking on the New Zealand Maori All Stars.

==== NRL Nines ====
In 2014, the inaugural rugby league nines tournament took place, featuring all sixteen NRL clubs. It was initially staged at Eden Park, Auckland, New Zealand. Women's nines games were also fixtured alongside the main tournament between the Australian and New Zealand national women's teams, however in later tournaments included NRLW teams. It was envisaged that the tournament would become a regular fixture each year; however, by 2018, the tournament was removed from the calendar, citing an excessive player workload. It was brought back in 2020, but hasn't been played since for the same reason.

==== World Club Challenge ====
The World Club Challenge is an annual pre-season match played between the champion of the National Rugby League and the champion of the Super League. The first match of its kind was the 1976 World Club Challenge, and it was then played sporadically throughout the late 80s and 90s, including a one-off Super League tournament in 1997, before becoming a regular annual pre-season fixture since 2000.

In 2015, the competition was expanded to include two exhibition games before the Challenge game. This expanded series, called the World Club Series, ran from 2015 to 2017. The first two Series saw the leagues' champions joined by two invited teams from each league, resulting in a three-game series. Each invited team represented their league in a single game, played in the days leading up to the usual Challenge match. In 2017, only one invited team from each league participated, with the NRL citing tight schedules, distant travel and long seasons as an impediment to the Series. In 2018, the series was cancelled, with only the usual Challenge match played and has continued as a single match since. In 2021 and 2022, the Challenge match was cancelled because of the COVID-19 pandemic. In 2025, the event was cancelled again, with Penrith citing schedule conflicts.

=== Premiership rounds ===
As rugby league is a winter sport in Australia, the NRL premiership season begins in early March, with games played every weekend for 27 weeks, until the start of September. In most rounds, one match is played on Thursday night, two on Friday night, three on Saturday and two on Sunday. Teams receive two competition points for a win, and one point for a draw. The bye also receives two points; a loss, no points. Teams on the ladder are ranked by competition points in descending order, then match points differential (for and against) in descending order, and points percentage, are used to separate teams with equal competition points and equal points differential. At the end of the regular season, the club that is ranked highest on the ladder is declared minor premiers.

==== Rugby League Las Vegas ====
Beginning in the 2024 season Rugby League Las Vegas is an annual event held at the Allegiant Stadium in Las Vegas showcasing the sport of rugby league. The event was created by the NRL to expand the audience of the competition and develop rugby league in the United States. It features two Round 1 NRL matches and from 2025, a Round 3 Super League game as well. The event is currently contracted until 2028.

==== Magic Round ====
In 2019, the NRL introduced Magic Round, which featured all matches playing at Lang Park in Brisbane over the weekend. It was deemed a success and has now been a scheduled annual event since.

==== Themed rounds ====
Special themed weeks within the premiership rounds include ANZAC Round, Heritage Round, Women in League Round, Retro Round, Beanies for Brain Cancer round, and Rivalry Round. Separate trophies between rival teams are also presented throughout the season.

In 2022, the NRL held various themed rounds, including a Pride Round (to celebrate and respect inclusivity of LGBTQ+ players); Multicultural Round; ANZAC Round; Brain Cancer Round; and Women in League Round. However, following the boycott of the game by seven Manly players who refused to wear the specially designed jersey and ensuing poor publicity, it was decided not to have a Pride Round in 2023, but to stick with the other four rounds.

=== Mid-season representative rounds ===
As well as playing for their club in the premiership, NRL players are regularly selected to play in a number of representative competitions that are conducted throughout each season. The representative rounds generally occur in a period that runs from about the middle of April until the middle of July each year. These matches have included:

- The annual Anzac Test between Australia and New Zealand (April–May; 1997–2017)
- Test matches between Pacific Island Nations, played on the same weekend as the Anzac Test. These games feature matches placed between the Cook Islands, Fiji, Papua New Guinea, Samoa, and Tonga, and includes the Melanesian Cup and Polynesian Cup
- The three match State of Origin series (June – July)
- Additionally, players from outside Oceania may travel home to take part in training camps or matches for their national side.

=== Finals series ===
The eight highest placed teams at the end of the regular season compete in the finals series. The system consists of a number of games between the top eight teams over four weeks in September, until only two teams remain. These two teams then contest the grand final, which is usually played on the first Sunday of October. From 1998 to 2011, the NRL used the McIntyre final eight system but with the introduction of the ARLC, it was decided to change to the current format which was perceived as fairer for teams finishing in the top four.

=== Grand final ===
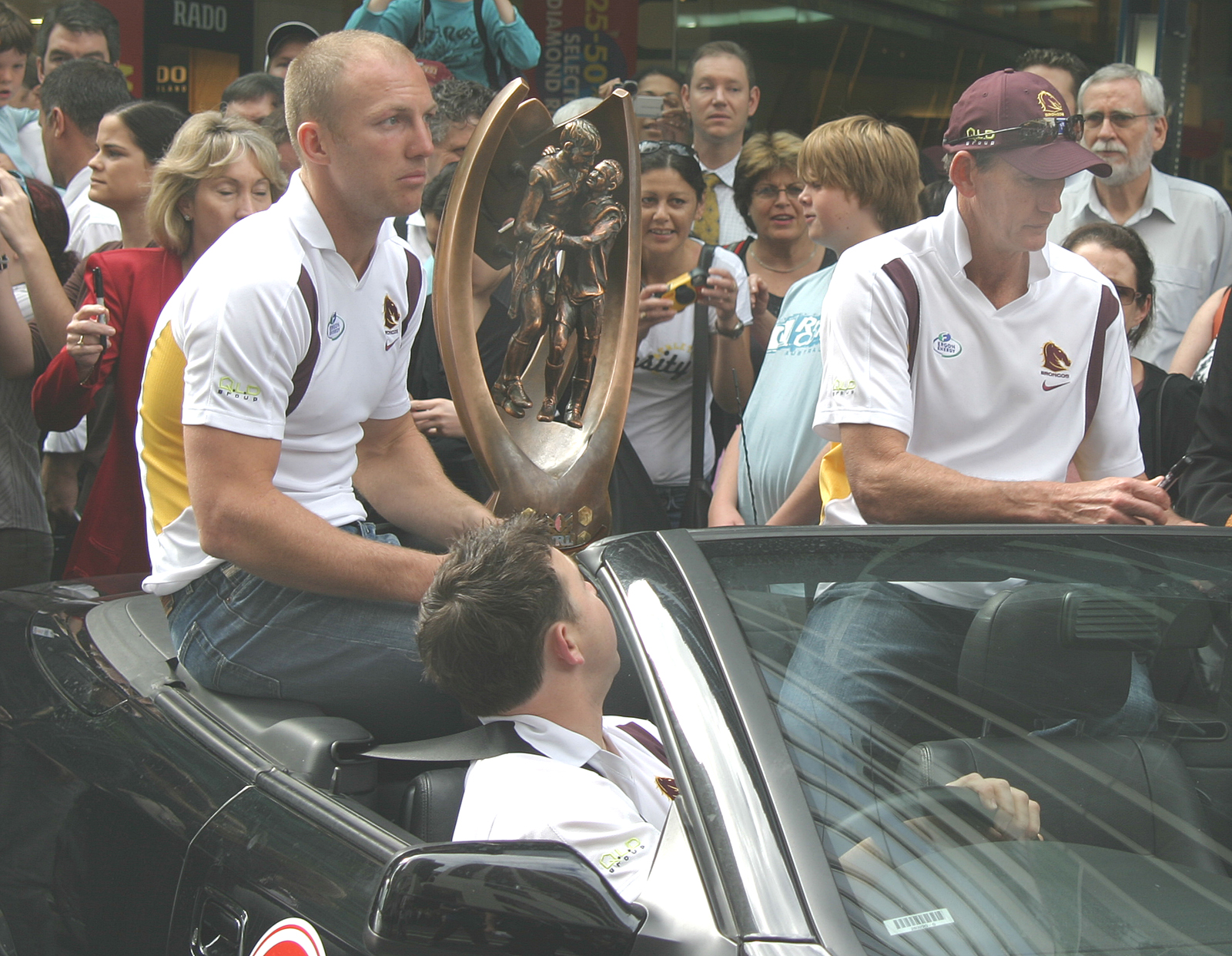
Darren Lockyer and Wayne Bennett parade the premiership after the Brisbane Broncos' Grand Final victory in 2006.

The NRL Grand Final, which determines the season's premiers, is one of Australia's major sporting events and is one of the highest attended club championship events in the world. It has been contested at Sydney's Stadium Australia each year since 1999, with the exception of 2021 when it was played at Brisbane's Lang Park due to the COVID pandemic. The first year it was held at Stadium Australia, the NRL Grand Final broke the record for attendance at an Australian rugby league game, with 107,999 people attending.

The game itself is usually preceded by an opening ceremony featuring entertainment and the singing of the national anthem by well-known Australasian and international musical acts. At the conclusion of the grand final, there is a presentation ceremony where the winning team are awarded the Provan-Summons Trophy and premiership rings to each player and the head coach. The player judged to be the man-of-the-match by the Australian national team selectors is awarded the prestigious Clive Churchill Medal and the Prime Minister of Australia is typically on-hand to hand the trophy to the winning captain.

=== Post-season internationals ===
Following the NRL premiership's conclusion, international representative matches and tournaments are typically scheduled to be played. These have included:

- The quadrennial Rugby League World Cup
- The Rugby League Pacific Championships involving both men's and women's national teams.
- The Prime Minister's XIII match in Papua New Guinea
- The Tri-Nations and Four Nations tournaments (1999–2016) which involved Australia, New Zealand, Great Britain/England, and from 2009 an additional regional national side.
- The Rugby League World Cup 9s held in 2019.
- Additional test matches between Australia and New Zealand.
- Tours to European Rugby League countries, or hosting tours of European Rugby League national teams.

== Players ==
National Rugby League footballers are among Australasia's most famous athletes, commanding multimillion-dollar playing contracts and sponsorship deals. Each club in the NRL has a "top squad" of twenty-five players, who are signed under a salary cap. For the most part, the players who play in NRL matches are sourced from these top squads. During a season the need may arise for a club to use players outside these 25, in which case players are usually sourced from the club's corresponding NRL Under-20s team or a feeder club in the New South Wales Cup or Queensland Cup.

=== Demographics ===
In recent years, the influence of Polynesian players on the NRL has grown, with figures from the 2011 season showing that 35% of NRL players and over 45% of NRL Under-20s players are of Polynesian background. This increase in Polynesian players has been blamed for the decline of Indigenous players, dropping from 21% in the 1990s to 11% for the 2009 season.

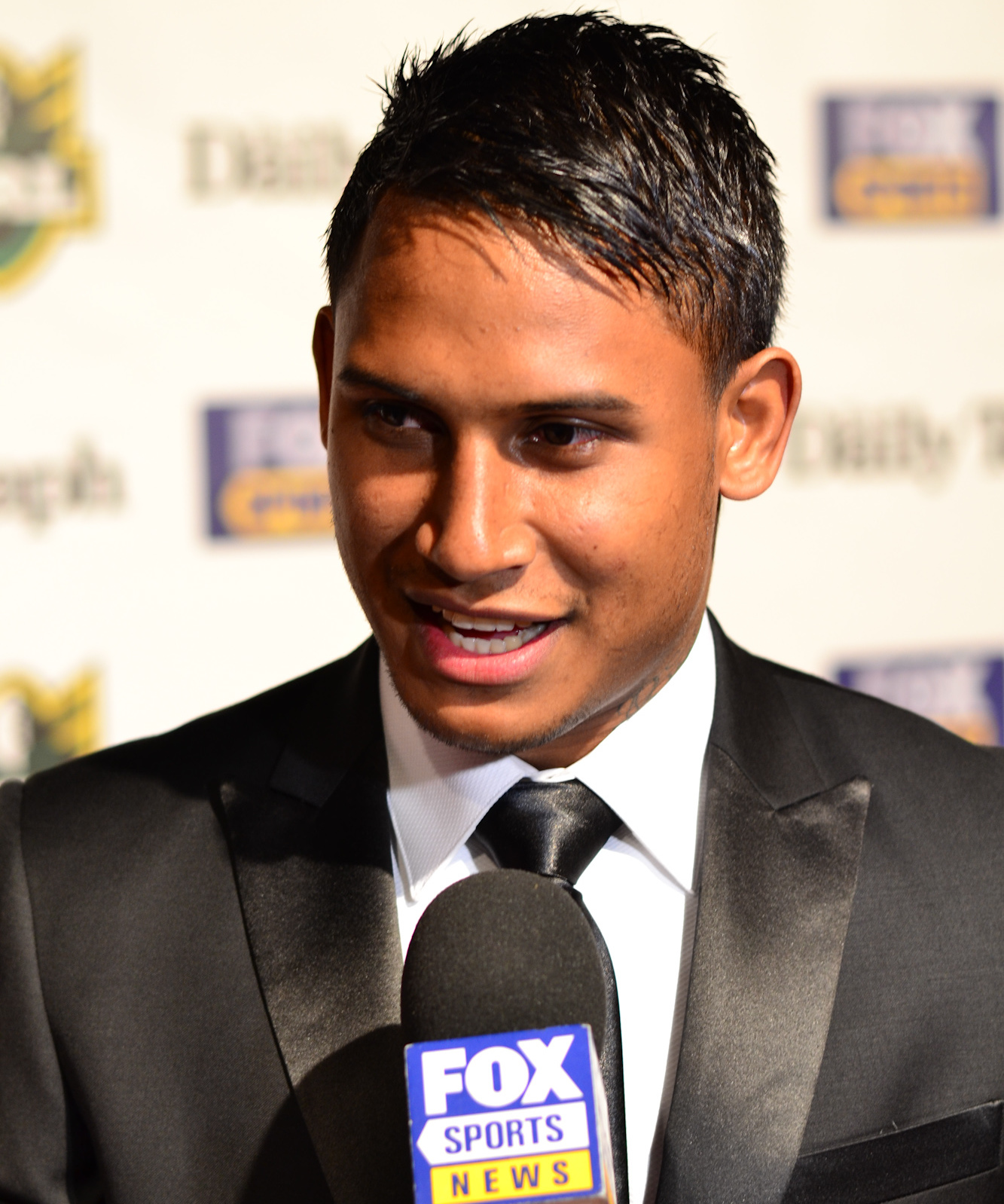
Ben Barba at the Dally M awards

The first Indigenous Australian to play in the NSWRL/NRL was New South Wales Rugby League premiership player George Green, who debuted in 1909. Since that time, many high-profile indigenous athletes have played in the competition, including Arthur Beetson (the first Aboriginal person to captain an Australian national team in any sport) and former Test match representatives Johnathan Thurston and Greg Inglis.

At the elite level of the game, Indigenous Australians represented 35% of the roster for the Kangaroos, 21% of players at the 2012 State of Origin series, 12% of NRL players and a further 8% of the NRL Under-20s players. By way of comparison, 2.3% of the Australian population identified themselves as Indigenous in the 2006 Australian census.

To celebrate the strong Indigenous ties to the game, the NRL holds a preseason All Stars game, featuring a team made up of Indigenous Australians playing a publicly voted team consisting of the non-Indigenous players, and an Indigenous Leadership Group has formed, consisting of the game's elite Indigenous players. The Leadership Group hosts regular multi-day camps where all Indigenous NRL players are invited to learn more about Indigenous culture.

Both the All Stars match and the Leadership Group were ideas pioneered by former player Preston Campbell, with the All Stars man of the match receiving the Preston Campbell medal.

=== Salary cap ===
A salary cap was introduced to the NSWRL in 1990 to even the playing field of teams in the Winfield Cup. As of 2013, the club grant is $7.1 million, which covers the salary cap of $5.85 million and a minimum wage of $80,000 for the top twenty-five players at each club. The salary cap increased to $6.3 million in 2014, $6.55 million in 2015, $6.8 million by 2016 and $7 million in 2017.

The cap is actively policed and penalties for clubs found to have breached the NRL salary cap regulations include fines of lesser of half the amount involved or $500,000 and/or deduction of premiership points. For example, six clubs were fined for minor infractions in 2003. These infractions are usually technical in nature and can sometimes be influenced by third-party factors, such as loss of sponsorship revenue affecting an allowance. During the 2007 season, the NRL implemented ways of creating a fair and more beneficial cap for players and clubs.

In 2010, following the Melbourne Storm salary cap scandal, the NRL introduced requirements for players and their agents to sign statutory declarations pledging their contracts comply with salary cap regulations, where previously only club chairmen and chief executives did so for biannual salary cap audits.

Major breaches of the cap

In 2002, the Bulldogs were fined the maximum of $500,000 and deducted all 37 premiership points received during the season after it was found that they had committed serious and systematic breaches of the salary cap totalling $2.13 million over the past three years, including $750,000 in 2001 and $920,000 in 2002; these were described by NRL chief executive David Gallop as "exceptional in both its size and its deliberate and ongoing nature". The points penalty meant that the club won the 2002 wooden spoon (Souths would have finished last if not for the breaches), and as the club had been leading the competition table prior to the imposition of the penalties, this was a shattering outcome for the club and its fans. Two senior club officials were jailed for fraud as a result of these breaches.

In 2005, the New Zealand Warriors were fined $430,000 and were ordered to start the 2006 season with a four premiership point deficit and cut their payroll by $450,000 after club officials revealed that their former management had exceeded the salary cap by $1.1 million over the last two years. The points penalty meant that the Warriors missed a finals berth in 2006.

On 22 April 2010, following revelations by an internal whistleblower and investigation by the NRL, Storm officials revealed that the club had committed serious and systematic breaches of the salary cap regulations between 2006 and 2010 by running a well-organized dual contract and bookkeeping system that concealed a total of $3.78 million in payments made to players outside of the salary cap from the NRL. This included: $303,000 in 2006, $459,000 in 2007, $957,000 in 2008, $1.021 million in 2009 and $1.04 million in 2010. As a result, the club was stripped of the 2007 and 2009 premierships, 2006–2008 minor premierships and the following year, the 2010 World Club Challenge trophy. They were also fined a then Australian sporting record of $1.689 million ($1.1 million in NRL prize money which was equally distributed between the remaining 15 clubs, $89,000 in prize money from the World Club Challenge which was distributed to the Leeds Rhinos, and a maximum of $500,000 for breaching the salary cap regulations). In addition, they were ordered to cut their payroll by $1.0125 million, deducted all eight premiership points received during the 2010 season and barred from receiving premiership points for the remainder of the 2010 season. The points penalty meant that the club won the 2010 wooden spoon. The former directors attempted unsuccessful legal action against the penalties, which collapsed, and the club also had to pay the NRL's legal costs. The matter was also referred to ASIC, the Australian Tax Office, the Victorian State Revenue Office, and the Victoria Police to investigate possible fraud; however, by May 2011, these investigations were closed. The players themselves were found to have not done anything wrong during this time, so individual awards are recognised. In addition, the players were still eligible for Test/State of Origin selection.

Prior to the start of the 2016 NRL season, the Parramatta Eels faced the prospect with starting the season on −4 points due to salary cap indiscretions in 2015, however the NRL was satisfied with governance changes at the Eels and no points were deducted. However, it was revealed in March that third-party payments had been made by several companies to several players, which is strictly prohibited in the NRL. On 3 May 2016, NRL CEO Todd Greenberg announced that the club would be docked the twelve competition points they have accrued so far this season, as well as fined $1 million and stripped of the 2016 NRL Auckland Nines title it won in February. In addition, the NRL also announced that the Eels would not be able to accrue any further competition points until they fall under the salary cap, which they were reported to be $500,000 over as of 3 May 2016. Five officials, including chairman Steve Sharp, deputy chairman Tom Issa, director Peter Serrao, chief executive John Boulous and football manager Daniel Anderson, were also sacked. On 9 July, after over 2 months of club officials contesting the preliminary penalties, Parramatta were handed their punishment with the addition of their for/against points tally accumulated from rounds 1–9 being deducted.

In 2018, the Manly-Warringah Sea Eagles were fined $750,000, two officials (Neil Bare and Joe Kelly were suspended, and a $660,000 penalty was applied to the salary cap for 2018 and the next year for breaches of the salary cap). Manly was proved by the NRL chief executive that third-party payments and deals were made to attract more players to the club.

Judiciary and Integrity Unit

The NRL Judiciary is made up of former players who convene in three-man panels to rule on on-field incidents. The judiciary is currently chaired by Wollongong district court judge Paul Conlon and made up of former players Mal Cochrane, Michael Buettner, Bradley Clyde, Sean Garlick, Don McKinnon and Bob Lindner.

An integrity Unit was formed on 7 February 2013 and was headed by former Federal Court judge Tony Whitlam, since 2022 the new head of the NRL integrity Unit is former Manly Sea-Eagles front-row forward, Jason King.

== Awards ==
=== Provan-Summons trophy ===
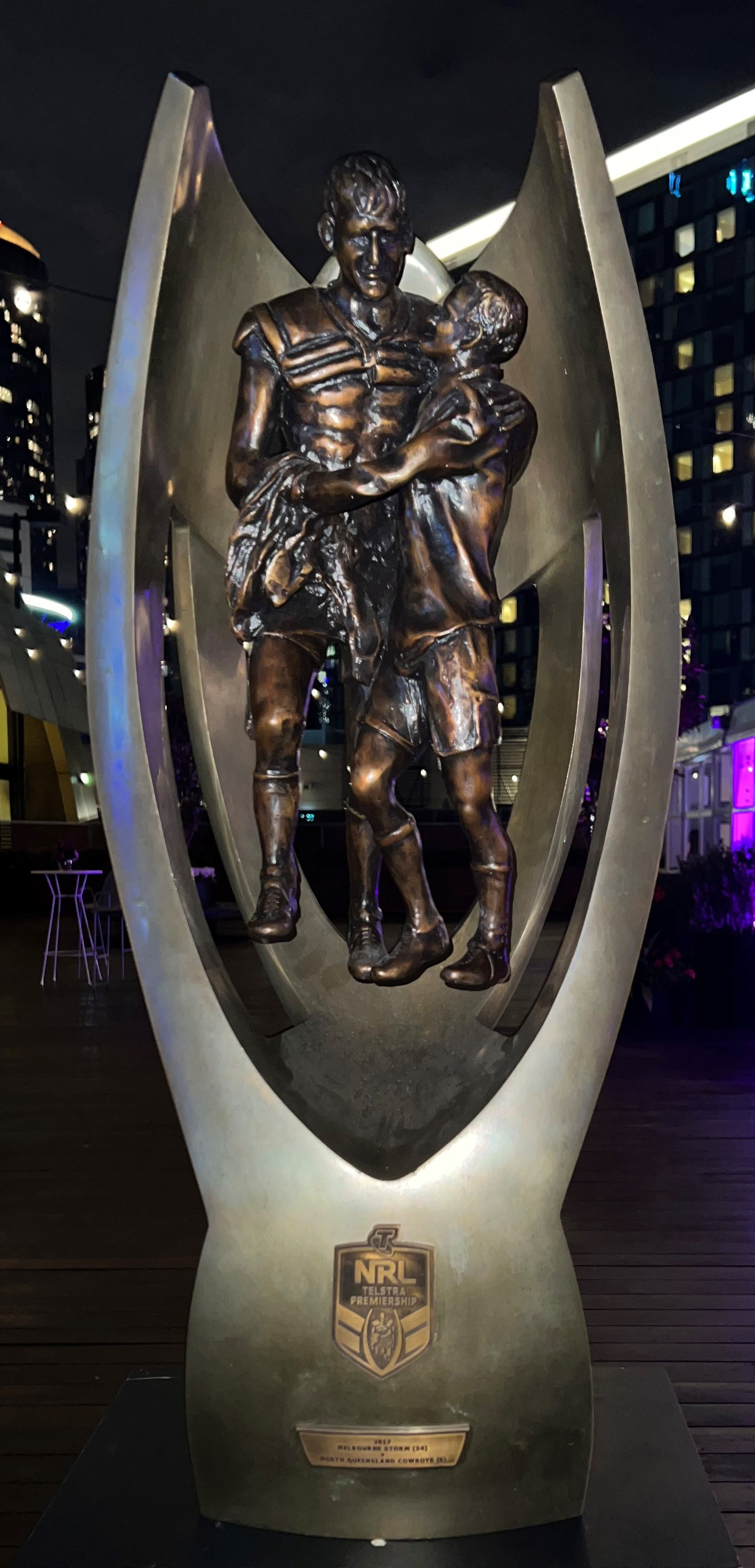
The 2017 edition of the Provan-Summons Trophy which was awarded to the Melbourne Storm.

The Provan-Summons trophy is the NRL's main prize, awarded to the team that wins the premiership. Its sculptured design is similar to the Winfield Cup trophy, which was introduced for the 1982 NSWRFL season. It is a three-dimensional cast of a famous photo called The Gladiators, which depicts a mud-soaked Norm Provan of St. George and Arthur Summons of Western Suburbs embracing after the 1963 NSWRFL season's Grand Final. It was not officially named the Provan-Summons Trophy until 2013, the 50th anniversary of the 1963 Grand Final. The trophy is awarded following each grand final to the captain of the winning club. The trophy was mysteriously broken during the grand final celebrations in 2021.

Each player from the premiership-winning side is also awarded premiership rings.

=== J. J. Giltinan Shield ===
Created in 1951, the J. J. Giltinan Shield is awarded to the club that finished first on the NRL ladder after the premiership season concludes. Typically, this team is known as the minor premiers.

=== Clive Churchill medal ===
The Clive Churchill Medal is awarded to the most outstanding player in a grand final. It is named after former Australian fullback Clive Churchill.

=== Dally M awards ===
The Dally M Medal is the highlight of the Dally M Awards and was named after Henry Herbert 'Dally' Messenger, who was instrumental in the establishment of rugby league football in Australia. The awards were introduced in 1980 by News Limited. The Dally M has been the official player-of-the-year award, and the highest individual honour in Australian rugby league, since the unification of the game in 1998. Before 1998, the highest award was the Rothmans Medal.

The medal is awarded, usually by the Australian Prime Minister, at the annual Dally M Awards night. As well as honouring the best and fairest player of the year, the Dally M awards recognise the premier player in each position, the best coach and the most outstanding rookie of the season.

=== The Immortals ===
Originally, The Immortals were four players named by the sport's major Australian magazine Rugby League Week as the nation's greatest ever.

Established in 1981, the group was four former Test captains, Clive Churchill, Bob Fulton, Reg Gasnier, Johnny Raper and were those appointed by Rugby League Week between 1981 and 2012. Wally Lewis, Graeme Langlands added in 1999 Arthur Beetson 2003 Andrew Johns 2012

Following the demise of Rugby League Week, the Australian Rugby League Commission took ownership of The Immortals concept and expanded the group on 1 August 2018 by inclusion of Mal Meninga, Norm Provan, Frank Burge, Dave Brown and Dally Messenger. Ron Coote was named the 14th immortal in 2024.

=== Queensland Rugby League's Team of the Century ===
The Queensland Rugby League's Team of the Century is a team that consisted of the greatest rugby league players from 1909 to 2008. This team was picked by six judges in 2008 from a list of 100 nominated players.

=== New South Wales Rugby League's Team of the Century ===
The New South Wales Rugby League's Team of the Century is a team that consisted of the greatest rugby league players from 1908 to 2007.

== Title winners ==
=== By season ===
Season	Grand Finals			Minor Premiers (Ladder points)
Season	Premiers (Titles)	Match	Runners-up	Minor Premiers (Ladder points)
1998	**Brisbane Broncos** (4th)	38 – 12	Canterbury Bulldogs	Brisbane Broncos (37)
1999	**Melbourne Storm** **(1st)**	20 – 18	St. George Illawarra Dragons	Cronulla-Sutherland Sharks (40)
2000	**Brisbane Broncos** (5th)	14 – 6	Sydney Roosters	Brisbane Broncos (38)
2001	**Newcastle Knights** (2nd)	30 – 24	Parramatta Eels	Parramatta Eels (42)
2002	**Sydney Roosters** (12th)	30 – 8	New Zealand Warriors	New Zealand Warriors (38)
2003	**Penrith Panthers** (2nd)	18 – 6	Sydney Roosters	Penrith Panthers (40)
2004	**Canterbury-Bankstown Bulldogs** (8th)	16 – 13	Sydney Roosters	Sydney Roosters (42)
2005	**Wests Tigers** **(1st)**	30 – 16	North Queensland Cowboys	Parramatta Eels (36)
2006	**Brisbane Broncos** (6th)	15 – 8	Melbourne Storm	~~Melbourne Storm~~ ^{a}
2007	~~Melbourne Storm~~ ^{a}	~~34 – 8~~	~~Manly Warringah Sea Eagles~~	~~Melbourne Storm~~ ^{a}
2008	**Manly Warringah Sea Eagles** (7th)	40 – 0	Melbourne Storm	~~Melbourne Storm~~ ^{a}
2009	~~Melbourne Storm~~ ^{a}	~~23 – 16~~	~~Parramatta Eels~~	St. George Illawarra Dragons (38)
2010	**St. George Illawarra Dragons** **(1st)**	32 – 8	Sydney Roosters	St. George Illawarra Dragons (38)
2011	**Manly Warringah Sea Eagles** (8th)	24 – 10	New Zealand Warriors	Melbourne Storm (42)
2012	**Melbourne Storm** (2nd)	14 – 4	Canterbury-Bankstown Bulldogs	Canterbury-Bankstown Bulldogs (40)
2013	**Sydney Roosters** (13th)	26 – 18	Manly Warringah Sea Eagles	Sydney Roosters (40)
2014	**South Sydney Rabbitohs** (21st)	30 – 6	Canterbury-Bankstown Bulldogs	Sydney Roosters (36)
2015	**North Queensland Cowboys** **(1st)**	17 – 16	Brisbane Broncos	Sydney Roosters (40)
2016	**Cronulla-Sutherland Sharks** **(1st)**	14 – 12	Melbourne Storm	Melbourne Storm (42)
2017	**Melbourne Storm** (3rd)	34 – 6	North Queensland Cowboys	Melbourne Storm (44)
2018	**Sydney Roosters** (14th)	21 – 6	Melbourne Storm	Sydney Roosters (34)
2019	**Sydney Roosters** (15th)	14 – 8	Canberra Raiders	Melbourne Storm (42)
2020	**Melbourne Storm** (4th)	26 – 20	Penrith Panthers	Penrith Panthers (37)
2021	**Penrith Panthers** (3rd)	14 – 12	South Sydney Rabbitohs	Melbourne Storm (44)
2022	**Penrith Panthers** (4th)	28 – 12	Parramatta Eels	Penrith Panthers (42)
2023	**Penrith Panthers** (5th)	26 – 24	Brisbane Broncos	Penrith Panthers (42)
2024	**Penrith Panthers** (6th)	14 – 6	Melbourne Storm	Melbourne Storm (44)
2025	**Brisbane Broncos** (7th)	26 – 22	Melbourne Storm	Canberra Raiders (44)
2026	**Sydney Roosters** (16th)	19 – 18	Newcastle Knights	Penrith Panthers (42)

Notes

^{a}: Melbourne Storm were stripped of their 2007, 2009 premiership titles and their 2006, 2007, 2008 minor premiership titles due to their breach of the salary cap. The titles were withheld by the NRL rather than being awarded to the runners-up, with the 2007 and 2009 Grand Finals being retroactively declared null and void.

=== By club ===
Although the NRL was not formed until 1998, the league recognises clubs that were named Premiers before the league's foundation. Clubs highlighted in green indicate those currently competing in the NRL; years in bold indicate those in the NRL era. The club that is the current defending premier is highlighted in yellow. The Gold Coast Titans and the Dolphins are the only current clubs that have not reached a grand final.

	Team	Premiers	Runners-up	Years won	Years runner-up
1	South Sydney Rabbitohs	21	14	1908, 1909, 1914, 1918, 1925, 1926, 1927, 1928, 1929, 1931, 1932, 1950, 1951, 1953, 1954, 1955, 1967, 1968, 1970, 1971, **2014**	1910, 1916, 1917, 1920, 1923, 1924, 1935, 1937, 1939, 1949, 1952, 1965, 1969, **2021**
2	Sydney Roosters	16	15	1911, 1912, 1913, 1923, 1935, 1936, 1937, 1940, 1945, 1974, 1975, **2002, 2013, 2018, 2019, 2026**	1908, 1919, 1921, 1928, 1931, 1934, 1938, 1941, 1960, 1972, 1980, **2000, 2003, 2004, 2010**
3	St. George Dragons	15	12	1941, 1949, 1956, 1957, 1958, 1959, 1960, 1961, 1962, 1963, 1964, 1965, 1966, 1977, 1979	1927, 1930, 1933, 1942, 1946, 1953, 1971, 1975, 1985, 1992, 1993, 1996
4	Balmain Tigers	11	9	1915, 1916, 1917, 1919, 1920, 1924, 1939, 1944, 1946, 1947, 1969	1909, 1936, 1945, 1948, 1956, 1964, 1966, 1988, 1989
5	Manly Warringah Sea Eagles	8	11	1972, 1973, 1976, 1978, 1987, 1996, **2008, 2011**	1951, 1957, 1959, 1968, 1970, 1982, 1983, 1995, 1997, **2007, 2013**
5	Canterbury-Bankstown Bulldogs	8	10	1938, 1942, 1980, 1984, 1985, 1988, 1995, **2004**	1940, 1947, 1967, 1974, 1979, 1986, 1994, **1998, 2012, 2014**
6	**Brisbane Broncos**	7	2	1992, 1993, 1997, **1998, 2000, 2006, 2025**	**2015, 2023**
7	Penrith Panthers	6	2	1991, **2003, 2021, 2022, 2023, 2024**	1990, **2020**
9	Western Suburbs Magpies	4	8	1930, 1934, 1948, 1952	1918, 1925, 1932, 1950, 1958, 1961, 1962, 1963
9	Parramatta Eels	4	6	1981, 1982, 1983, 1986	1976, 1977, 1984, **2001, 2009, 2022**
9	Melbourne Storm	4	6	**1999**, ~~**2007**~~, ~~**2009**~~, **2012, 2017, 2020**	**2006,** **2008, 2016, 2018, 2024, 2025**
12	Newtown Jets	3	7	1910, 1933, 1943	1913, 1914, 1929, 1944, 1954, 1955, 1981
12	Canberra Raiders	3	3	1989, 1990, 1994	1987, 1991, **2019**
14	North Sydney Bears/Perth Bears	2	1	1921, 1922	1943
14	Newcastle Knights	2	1	1997, **2001**	**2026**
16	Cronulla-Sutherland Sharks	1	3	**2016**	1973, 1978, 1997
16	North Queensland Cowboys	1	2	**2015**	**2005, 2017**
16	St. George Illawarra Dragons	1	1	**2010**	**1999**
16	Wests Tigers	1	0	**2005**	–
20	Glebe Dirty Reds	0	4	–	1911, 1912, 1915, 1922
20	Warriors	0	2	–	**2002, 2011**
20	Sydney University	0	1	–	1926

== Records ==
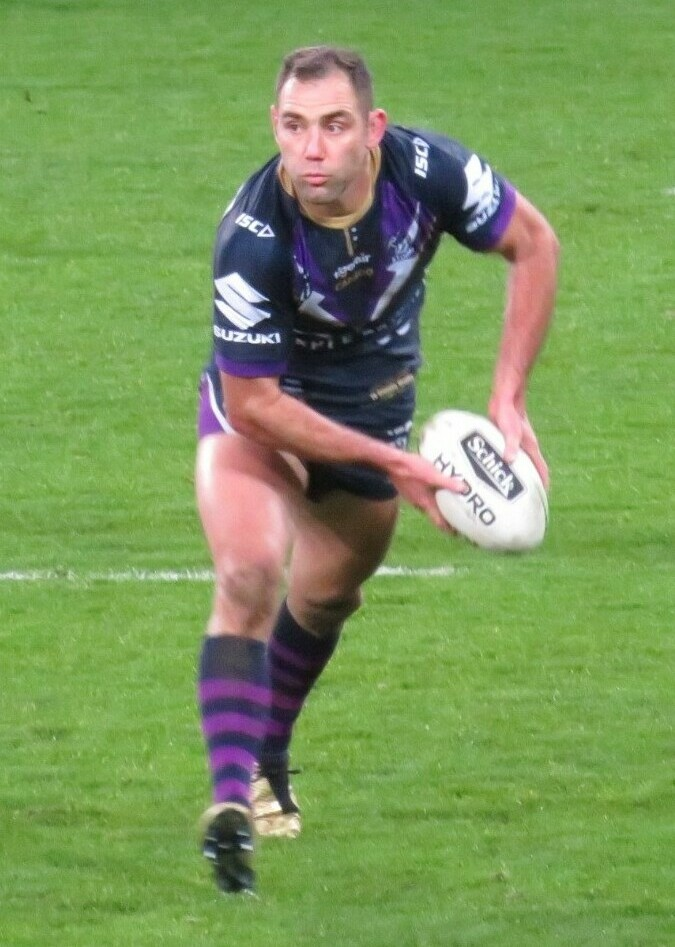
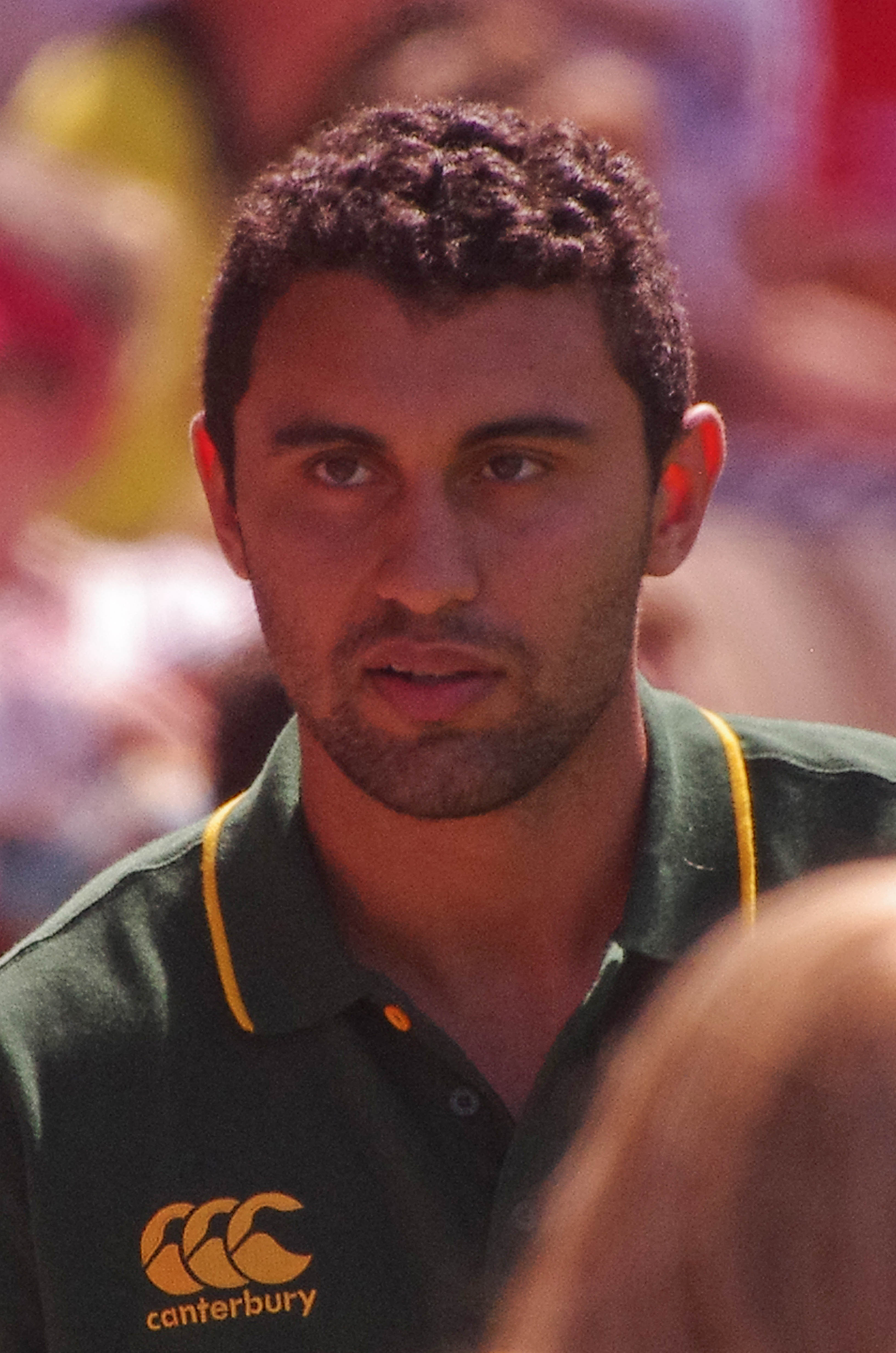
Cameron Smith (left) holds the all-time NRL records of most games played and most points scored; current player Alex Johnston (right) holds the record of most tries scored in the NRL.

Official NRL statistics encompass all first-grade competitions, namely the New South Wales Rugby League, Australian Rugby League, Super League, and the present-day NRL.

=== Team ===
- Most premierships: 21 – South Sydney Rabbitohs (1908, 1909, 1914, 1918, 1925, 1926, 1927, 1928, 1929, 1931, 1932, 1950, 1951, 1953, 1954, 1955, 1967, 1968, 1970, 1971, 2014)
  - In NRL era: 5 – Penrith Panthers (2003, 2021, 2022, 2023, 2024) and Sydney Roosters (2002, 2013, 2018, 2019, 2026)
- Most premierships in a row: 11 – St. George from 1956 to 1966
  - In NRL era: 4 – Penrith Panthers from 2021 to 2024
- Most minor premierships: 20 – Sydney Roosters
  - In NRL era: 6 – Melbourne Storm
- Highest score in a game: 91 – St. George against Canterbury-Bankstown in 1935
- Largest winning margin in a game: 85 – St. George 91–6 against Canterbury-Bankstown in 1935
- Longest winning streak: 19 matches – Eastern Suburbs Roosters in 1975; Melbourne Storm in 2021
- Longest undefeated streak: 35 matches – Eastern Suburbs (1935–1938)
- Longest losing streak: 42 matches – University (1934–1936)
- Most wooden spoons: 17 – Western Suburbs Magpies

=== Individual ===
- Most games played: 430 – Cameron Smith
- Most points scored: 2,786 – Cameron Smith from 48 tries, 1,295 goals & 4 field goals
- Most tries scored: 240 – Alex Johnston
- Most points scored in a season: 300 – Reuben Garrick from 21 tries & 110 goals in 2021
- Most points scored in a season – including finals: 342 – Hazem El Masri from 16 tries & 139 goals in 2004
- Most tries in a season: 38 – Dave Brown in 1935
- Most points in a game: 45 – Dave Brown in 1935
- Most tries in a game: 8 – Frank Burge in 1920
- Most Dally M Medals: 4 – Johnathan Thurston in 2005, 2007, 2014 & 2015
- Most Clive Churchill Medals: 3 – Norm Provan in 1957, 1958 & 1963 (all retroactively awarded)

== Audience ==
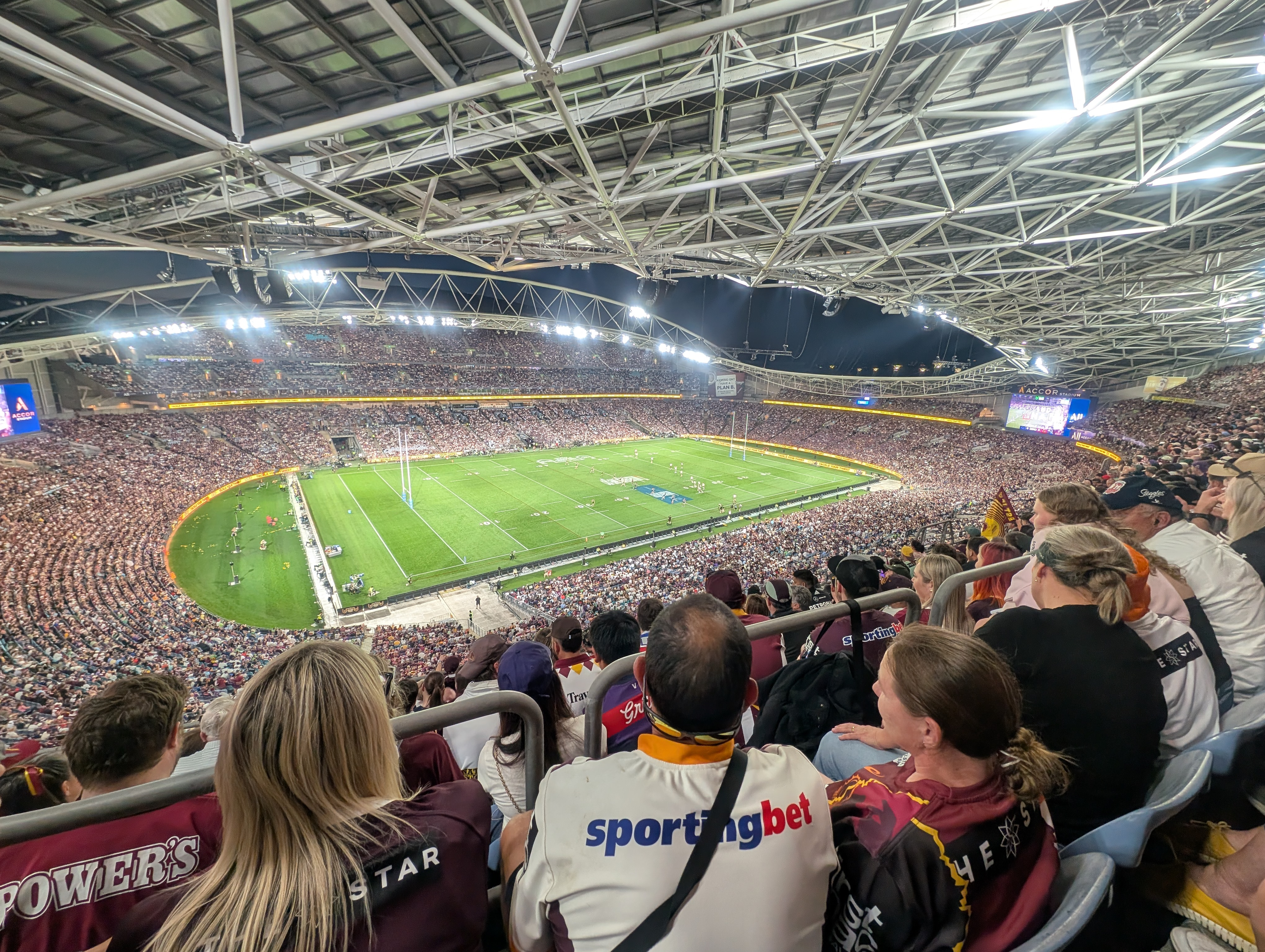
The NRL Grand Final held at Sydney's Stadium Australia is one of the largest annual sporting events in Australia. (2025 match pictured)

The 2022 season rated 134.447 million viewers in Australia, at an average viewership of 620,000 per game, with a roughly 60/40 split between viewers when games are broadcast both free-to-air on Nine and subscription viewers on Fox League and Kayo Sports.

=== Attendance ===
Season	Total	Average	Grand Final Attendance
1998	2,937,741	11,612	40,857
1999	3,273,372	15,368	107,999
2000	2,959,390	15,494	94,277
2001	2,682,210	14,043	90,414
2002	2,656,198	14,054	80,130
2003	2,965,141	15,689	81,166
2004	3,010,639	15,929	82,127
2005	3,276,675	17,337	82,453
2006	3,115,700	16,485	79,609
2007	3,332,114	16,578	81,392
2008	3,279,663	16,317	80,388
2009	3,412,872	16,980	82,538
2010	3,491,890	17,373	82,334
2011	3,464,207	17,235	81,988
2012	3,486,494	17,346	82,976
2013	3,345,248	16,643	81,491
2014	3,376,409	16,798	83,833
2015	3,230,867	16,074	82,758
2016	3,228,623	16,063	83,625
2017	3,018,795	15,246	79,722
2018	3,257,235	16,205	82,688
2019	3,176,561	15,804	82,922
2020	671,412*	5,245*	37,303
2021	2,083,258†	10,364†	39,322
2022	3,265,911	16,248	82,415
2023	4,086,547	19,186	81,947
2024	4,266,464	20,611	80,156
2025	4,390,791	21,418	80,223
2026	4,503,212	21,860	80,814
*Not all attendances were tallied up for the 2020 season, as such the figure is the total from known and provided crowd numbers.
†Some games in Rounds 16, 17, 20 and 21 were played to empty venues as a result of COVID-19 biosecurity protocols.

Key
	Record high
	Record low
*	Affected by the COVID-19 pandemic

== Media coverage ==
=== Television ===
==== ANZ and Pacific ====
Within Australia, all matches are broadcast on both the Nine Network and Fox Sports through 2027. The Fox Sports contract was signed in May 2020, and the NRL extended their contract on Nine in December 2021 to match the length of the contract with Fox Sports through 2027. In July 2026, Nine, Fox and Sky NZ signed a new agreement worth $5.3 billion to continue broadcasting rights until 2034. In New Zealand all matches, including representative fixtures such as the All Stars Match and the State of Origin series, are shown live on Sky Sport. Prime broadcasts select games live in New Zealand starting from the 2022 season, and will continue to broadcast every Warriors match on delay.

==== By Match-day ====
- Thursday Night Footy is broadcast live on the Nine Network and simulcast on Fox League and Kayo. Kickoff is at 7:50 pm.
- Friday Night Football consists of 2 matches. The first match kicks off at 6:00 pm and is broadcast live on Fox League. The second match kicks off at 8:00 pm and is broadcast live on the Nine Network and simulcast on Fox League and Kayo.
- Super Saturday consists of three matches. The first match kicks off at 3:00 pm, the second match kicks off at 5:30 pm and the third match kicks off at 7:35 pm. All three matches are broadcast live on Fox League and are simulcast live on Kayo. During the final five rounds of the year, the 7:35 pm match is also simulcast on Nine.
- NRL Sunday Ticket consists of two matches. The first match kicks off at 2:00 pm and is broadcast live on Fox League and Kayo. The second match kicks off at 4:10 pm and is broadcast live on the Nine Network and simulcast on Fox League and Kayo. During daylight savings, the 2:00 pm game is moved to 6:15 pm.

==== By Network ====
- Fox League and Kayo televise all matches live and commercial free (excluding the grand final).
- Nine Network televises the Thursday night game, the second Friday night game and the second Sunday afternoon game (first in daylight savings), as well as the last five Saturday 7:30 pm games of the year. In addition to this, Nine also televise the annual NRL Good Friday Game and Anzac Day Cup played at 4:05 pm in addition to their allotted games for that round. In the finals series, Nine televise all games, including the NRL Grand Final.
- The State of Origin series is televised exclusively live on the Nine Network, with extensive pre-game and post-game coverage, starting at 7:00 pm.
- The NRL Grand Final televised exclusively live on the Nine Network. Since 2013, the match has kicked off at 7:30 pm

==== NRL-related television programs ====
In Australia, there are television shows dedicated to discussing the NRL. The programs are listed in order of the day and time viewed in their primary broadcast market:

- The Sunday Footy Show (Sunday 11.00 am on Channel Nine): a recap of Thursday, Friday and Saturday's games, and a preview of Sunday's games. Hosted by Danika Mason.
- Sunday Night with Matty Johns (following Sunday Football on Fox League 502). Hosted by Matthew Johns.
- NRL 360 (Mondays-Wednesdays 6:30 pm on Fox League 502). Hosted by Braith Anasta and Paul Kent.
- 100% Footy (Mondays 10:30 pm on Channel 9): A recap of the weekend results along with topical discussions on the major issues surrounding the game. Hosted by James Bracey.
- The Fan (Tuesdays 7:30 pm on Fox League 502). Hosted by Andrew Voss with Lara Pitt.
- Over The Black Dot (Wednesdays 8:30 pm on NITV): An Indigenous Australian perspective on the NRL featuring highlights, discussion and interviews.
- The Late Show with Matty Johns (Thursdays 10:00 pm on Fox League 502). Hosted by Matthew Johns.
- League Legends (Sundays 6:30 pm on Fox League 502). Hosted by Tim Sheridan. (Broadcast during the off-season)
- Bloke in a Bar (Mondays, Wednesdays, and Fridays at 3:00 pm on YouTube). Hosted by Denan Kemp

Former shows:

- Barefoot Sports (Thursday 8:30 pm on NITV) Hosted by Brad Cooke and formerly known as The Barefoot Rugby League Show.
- One Week at a Time (Mondays, at 9:30 pm, on One), recapping the weekend games
- The Game Plan (Thursday 8:30 pm, on Channel Ten) Hosted by Steve Roach, Joel Caine and Andrew Moore.
- The Matty Johns Show (Thursdays, 7.30 pm on Channel Seven) A more sketch-and-regular-segment-oriented version of The Footy Show and The Game Plan, not related to Monday Night with Matty Johns.
- The Sunday Roast (Sunday Midday on Channel Nine) Now incorporated into the Sunday Footy Show.
- NRL Full-time, a weekly half-hour highlights show for the UK audience.
- On the Couch with Sterlo
- League Life (Wednesdays 7:30 pm on Fox League 502). Hosted by Yvonne Sampson.
- Queenslanders Only (Wednesdays 8:00 pm on Fox League 502). Hosted by Hannah Hollis. (Airs at 7:00 pm Queensland time during March due to NSW Daylight Saving Time)
- Narrow World of Sports (Fridays 10:00 pm on Fox League 502). Hosted by James 'The Professor' Rochford.

==== NZ Coverage ====
- Sky Sport: All games live on Sky Sport, including State of Origin and the grand final.
- Sky Open: Warriors games on live start or delay. Some select matches live.
- Three: Select NRL and State of Origin games live.

==== Pacific ====
In most Pacific countries, all matches are broadcast on Digicel and other networks in these four countries. Such as in Fiji, where it is on Mai TV and in PNG, where it is on TVWan.

Country	Broadcaster
Tonga	Digicel / Tonfon TV
Samoa	Digicel / TV3
Papua New Guinea	Digicel / TVWan
Fiji	Digicel / Mai TV

==== Outside ANZ and Pacific ====
The NRL is also available to the rest of the world.

Country/Region	Broadcaster
In flight/ship	Sport24
Worldwide	WatchNRL (streaming)
Sub-Saharan Africa (exc. North)	ESPN
Brunei/Malaysia/Singapore	Premier Sports Asia
United Arab Emirates/MENA	Premier Sports MENA
Netherlands	discontinued in 2020
Canada	Sportsnet
France	beIN Sports
United Kingdom/Ireland	Sky Sports
United States	Fox Sports
Germany/Austria/Switzerland	Sportdigital 1+

=== Internet ===
Outside of Australia, New Zealand, and the Pacific Islands, all matches are currently available in high definition on the subscription streaming service WatchNRL, which operates through its website and a dedicated app. Watch NRL is operated by Fox Sports Australia.

A selection of classic NRL games is available for free worldwide on the league's website.

=== Radio ===
==== Australia ====
The NRL has several exclusive rights partners to broadcast matches live via radio nationwide. FM coverage is provided by Triple M while AM coverage is contracted to ABC Local Radio and 2GB. All radio coverage is available to be streamed live from the NRL website.

2GB has the commercial rights to four matches per week, covering the game through the Continuous Call Team program. 2GB also airs representative games, as well as all matches throughout the finals series, and all three matches on Grand Final day. The coverage is networked to stations across the country, typically those owned by Southern Cross Media Group, Grant Broadcasters and other station groups on Nine Radio.

ABC Local Radio has the rights to seven NRL matches per week in the Australian Capital Territory, Queensland and New South Wales.

Triple M has exclusive access to Thursday night, Saturday 4:00 pm, and Sunday night matches and is broadcast on commercial stations across the country. Triple M also broadcast the State of Origin series, the finals series and the grand final.

2SM formerly held the rights to air Thursday Night and Sunday 4:00 pm games via NRL Nation. These games were also aired across their affiliates across NSW. 2UE also formerly held rights to matches.

Current Broadcasters:

- Triple M: Four games live per week (includes all Cowboys, Raiders, Knights and Titans home games live on home stations)
- 2GB: Four games live per week (includes Sunday 4:00 pm exclusive)
- ABC: Seven games live per week

=== Print ===
Big League was the competition's official publication, released on Thursday and produced by News Magazines. The publication ceased operations in 2020, leaving the game without an official program. Another prominent magazine, Rugby League Week ceased production in April 2017.

The only print magazine currently in circulation is the bi-monthly Rugby League Review, which has been running since 2002. LeagueUnlimited's Front Row Magazine provides an unofficial match program each week in a digital magazine format.

== Theme songs ==
- 1985–1988: The Boys Are Back in Town – Thin Lizzy
- 1989: What You Get Is What You See – Tina Turner
- 1990–1995: Simply The Best – Tina Turner
- 1997 (SL): Two Tribes – Frankie Goes to Hollywood
- 1997 (ARL): It's My Game – NSWRL
- 1998: Tubthumping – Chumbawamba
- 1999: Blow That Whistle – Thomas Keneally
- 2000: What A Game – Tom Jones
- 2001: Racing Car Noises over Action Highlights
- 2003–2007: That's My Team – Hoodoo Gurus
- 2008: Centenary of Rugby League Campaign
- 2009: Feels Like Woah – Wes Carr
- 2010: Social Currency – Children Collide
- 2011–2012: This Is Our House – Bon Jovi
- 2013: Something's Got a Hold on Me – Jessica Mauboy
- 2014: My Songs Know What You Did in the Dark – Fall Out Boy
- 2015: Let Me Entertain You – Robbie Williams
- 2016: History Happens
- 2017: Let's Make History
- 2018: Whatever It Takes – Imagine Dragons
- 2019: High Hopes – Panic! at the Disco
- 2020: The Best – Tina Turner
- 2021:
- 2022:
- 2023: When We Were Young – Architects and Fox League

== Video games ==
There have been many top-selling video games made for the Australian rugby league market. The games below are sorted by year released.

- E.T.'s Rugby League, named for Andrew Ettingshausen, was released on Amiga in 1992.
- Australian Rugby League (1995) for Sega Mega Drive
- ARL '96 was a PC game published by EA Sports for the 1996 season.
- Rugby League (2003) for Microsoft Windows, PlayStation 2, and Xbox
- Rugby League 2 (2005) for Microsoft Windows, PlayStation 2, and Xbox
- Rugby League 2: World Cup Edition (2008) for PlayStation 2
- NRL Mascot Mania (2009) for Nintendo DS
- Rugby League Challenge (2009) for PlayStation Portable
- Rugby League 3 (2010) for Wii
- Rugby League Live (2010) for PlayStation 3 Xbox 360; (2011) for Microsoft Windows
- Rugby League Live 2 (2012) for PlayStation 3 and Xbox 360
- Rugby League Legends (2012) iOS
- Rugby League Live 2: World Cup Edition (2013) for PlayStation 3 and Xbox 360
- Rugby League Live 3 (2015) for Steam, PlayStation 3, Xbox 360, PlayStation 4 and Xbox One
- Rugby League Live 4 (2017) for Steam, PlayStation 3, Xbox 360, PlayStation 4 and Xbox One
- Rugby League Live 4 World Cup Edition (2017) for Steam, PlayStation 3, Xbox 360, PlayStation 4 and Xbox One
- Rugby League 26 (2025) for Steam, PlayStation 4, Xbox One, PlayStation 5 and Xbox Series X/S

== Cheerleading ==
The Flames, the cheersquad for the St. George Illawarra Dragons, performing during an NRL match in 2018.

Most NRL teams have a squad of dancers for cheerleading that are usually involved in dancing, charity work, fundraisers, and modelling. Some notables who have been NRL cheerleaders include Jennifer Hawkins (Miss Universe 2004) for the Newcastle Knights, Chloe Butler (Lingerie Football League) for the Canberra Raiders and Tabrett Bethell (actress, 2007–2016) for the Cronulla-Sutherland Sharks.

=== Cheer squads ===
Name	NRL Club
Hog's Breath Cafe Broncos Cheer Squad	Brisbane Broncos
The Sapphire	Canterbury-Bankstown Bulldogs
Cronulla Sharks Mermaids	Cronulla-Sutherland Sharks
Manly Seabirds	Manly Warringah Sea Eagles
Newcastle Knights Cheerleaders	Newcastle Knights
North Queensland Cowgirls Spirit	North Queensland Cowboys
The Roosters Girls	Sydney Roosters

Note: The Wests Tigers, South Sydney Rabbitohs, St. George Illawarra Dragons, Parramatta Eels, Gold Coast Titans, Melbourne Storm, Warriors, Canberra Raiders and Dolphins do not have active cheer squads.

== Coaches ==
(* = interim coach)

Nat.	Name	Club	Start of tenure	Year as head coach of Club	Previous NRL clubs
(Australia)	Michael Maguire	Brisbane Broncos	2025	1st	South Sydney Rabbitohs (2012–2017); Wests Tigers (2019–2022)
(Australia)	Ricky Stuart	Canberra Raiders	2014	12th	Sydney Roosters (2002–2006); Cronulla (2007–2010); Parramatta (2013)
(Australia)	Cameron Ciraldo	Canterbury-Bankstown Bulldogs	2023	3rd	Penrith Panthers (2018*)
(Australia)	Craig Fitzgibbon	Cronulla-Sutherland Sharks	2022	4th	–
(Australia)	Des Hasler	Gold Coast Titans	2024	2nd	Manly Warringah Sea Eagles (2004-2011 2018-2022); Canterbury-Bankstown Bulldogs (2012-2017)
(Australia)	Anthony Seibold	Manly Warringah Sea Eagles	2023	3rd	South Sydney Rabbitohs (2018); Brisbane Broncos (2019–2020)
(Australia)	Craig Bellamy	Melbourne Storm	2003	22nd	Brisbane (2002*)
(Australia)	Adam O'Brien	Newcastle Knights	2020	6th	–
(Australia)	Andrew Webster	Warriors	2023	3rd	Wests Tigers (2016*)
(Australia)	Todd Payten	North Queensland Cowboys	2021	5th	Warriors (2020*)
(Australia)	Jason Ryles	Parramatta Eels	2025	1st	–
(Australia)	Ivan Cleary	Penrith Panthers	2019	7th	Warriors (2006–2011); Penrith Panthers (2012–2015); Wests Tigers (2017–2018)
(Australia)	Wayne Bennett	South Sydney Rabbitohs	2025	1st	Canberra Raiders (1987); Brisbane Broncos (1988–2008, 2015–2018); St George-Illawarra Dragons (2009–2011); Newcastle Knights (2012–2014); South Sydney Rabbitohs (2019–2021); Dolphins (2023–2024)
(Australia)	Shane Flanagan	St George-Illawarra Dragons	2024	2nd	Cronulla (2010–2013); Cronulla (2015–2018)
(Australia)	Trent Robinson	Sydney Roosters	2013	13th	–
(New Zealand)	Benji Marshall	Wests Tigers	2024	2nd	–
(Australia)	Kristian Woolf	Dolphins	2025	1st	–

=== Premiership winning coaches (NRL era) ===
Nationality	Name	Premierships as head coach		Runners-up as head coach		Minor Premierships as head coach	
Nationality	Name	No.	Years	No.	Years	No.	Years
(Australia)	Wayne Bennett	4	1998, 2000, 2006, 2010	2	2015, 2021	4	1998, 2000, 2009, 2010
(Australia)	Ivan Cleary	4	2021, 2022, 2023, 2024	2	2011, 2020	4	2020, 2022, 2023, 2026
(Australia)	Craig Bellamy	3	2007*, 2009*, 2012, 2017, 2020	6	2006, 2008, 2016, 2018, 2024, 2025	6	2011, 2016, 2017, 2019, 2021, 2024
(Australia)	Trent Robinson	4	2013, 2018, 2019 2026	0		4	2013, 2014, 2015, 2018
(Australia)	Des Hasler	2	2008, 2011	3	2007, 2012, 2014	1	2012
(Australia)	Michael Maguire	2	2014, 2025	0		0	
(Australia)	Ricky Stuart	1	2002	3	2003, 2004, 2019	2	2004, 2025
(Australia)	Paul Green	1	2015	1	2017	0	
(Australia)	Steve Folkes	1	2004	1	1998	0	
(Australia)	John Lang	1	2003	0		2	1999, 2003
(Australia)	Chris Anderson	1	1999	0		0	
(Australia)	Michael Hagan	1	2001	0		0	
(Australia)	Tim Sheens	1	2005	0		0	
(Australia)	Shane Flanagan	1	2016	0		0	

== Match officials ==
=== NRL Referees (mens) ===
Name	NRL Matches (Mens)	State Of Origin Matches (Mens)	International Matches (Mens)	NRL Finals (Mens)
Ashley Klein	452	23	61	34
Gerard Sutton	448	22	39	40
Grant Atkins	343	0	15	19
Adam Gee	316	0	11	18
Chris Butler^{☆}	155	0	2	0
Peter Gough	189	0	6	0
Ziggy Przeklasa-Adamski	78	0	2	0
Todd Smith	122	0	7	2
Liam Kennedy	72	0	2	0
Tyson Brough	3	0	2	0
Kieren Irons	2	0	1	0
Nick Pelgrave	2	0	1	0
Wyatt Raymond	60	0	2	0
Belinda Sharpe	23	0	18	0
Kasey Badger	5	0	3	0

^{☆}Indicates Chris Butler is no longer an On Field Referee in the National Rugby League, and has been stood down to Bunker Duties.

=== NRLW Referees ===
Name	NRLW Matches	State Of Origin Matches (Women's)	International Matches (Women's)
Kasey Badger	44	1	10
Izzy Davidson	2	0	0
Josh Eaton	9	0	0
Peter Gough	7	1	1
Kieren Irons	2	0	0
Liam Kennedy	8	0	2
Ethan Klein	5	0	0
Karra-Lee Nolan	19	0	1
Ziggy Przeklasa-Adamski	24	0	2
Luke Saldern	13	0	0
Belinda Sharpe	56	13	16
Rochelle Tamarua	20	0	2
Dillan Wells	9	0	1
Tori Wilkie	15	0	0

=== Bunker Duties ===
Name	NRL Matches in Bunker	NRLW Matches in Bunker	State Of Origin Games in Bunker (Men's)	State Of Origin Games in Bunker (Women's)	International Games in Bunker (Men's)	International Games in Bunker (Women's)
Grant Atkins	153	0	8	1	10	4
Kasey Badger	74	42	0	4	0	1
Chris Butler	240	17	6	1	9	2
Adam Gee	121	8	0	2	12	5
Peter Gough	13	28	0	0	0	3
Liam Kennedy	58	19	1	1	3	4
Ashley Klein	385	1	2	2	28	3
Wyatt Raymond	50	9	0	1	2	2
Belinda Sharpe	0	10	0	0	0	0
Todd Smith	8	32	0	0	1	2
Gerard Sutton	80	16	0	1	4	2

== Sponsorship ==
The NRL and its clubs receive significant revenue from sponsorships, with sponsors' logos appearing on most parts of players' and referees' uniforms, the playing surface and even the ball itself. Since 2001, the National Rugby League premiership has been sponsored by Telstra and known as the 'NRL Telstra Premiership'. Prior to this, the competition was simply known as the 'National Rugby League'.

The Telstra Premiership has had five competition logos since 2001. The first, lasting only through the 2001 regular season, was the Telstra logo with an elongated circle enclosing the word Premiership. From the Finals series of 2001 through to the end of 2006, the logo was based around the shape of a football, with the words Telstra Premiership on respective lines along the bottom, culminating with a small football similar to the one in the official NRL logo at the peak. The main colours were dark blue and orange, the corporate colours of Telstra. The company worked with the NRL to create the third logo for the 2007 season onward as part of a new sponsorship deal. This logo was quite similar to the original National Rugby League emblem. From the 2011 Finals Series, a newer logo was commissioned in concert with a corporate rebrand undertaken by Telstra. The 2007 logo remained on club jerseys until 2012 due to the lateness of the change and was phased out in time for the 2013 NRL Season. From 2013, under a dramatic image rebranding of the competition, the Telstra Premiership logo was changed in conjunction with a new sponsorship deal to incorporate the key elements of rugby league in Australia to include the shield and chevrons, the green and gold, a red "Telstra" logo perched above the top of the shield and for the first time the iconic Provan-Summons trophy awarded to the premiers at the end of the season centred in the middle of the badge.

At the end of the 2018 season, the NRL launched a bold new look for its Telstra Premiership. The new look aims to modernise the Telstra Premiership brand as well as integrate it more seamlessly with the 16 clubs. The new brand, highlighting the shield and the chevron – which have both been synonymous with Rugby League since the game's inception.

Other notable sponsorships include Kia (Thursday Night Football), KFC (Friday Night Football), Bundaberg Rum (Super Saturday), Chemist Warehouse (Sunday Football). Steeden is the official match ball supplier, Westpac sponsor the match ball. The State of Origin series and the Australian Test matches (Kangaroos). Youi and Harvey Norman sponsor the on-field match officials, and Swyftx sponsors the NRL Bunker. Other Official NRL Sponsors are: Coca-Cola Europacific Partners, DoorDash, Hankook, Hisense, Home Hardware, Rebel, Treasury Wine Estates (Wolf Blass), Accor, Drinkwise, Red Bull, Carnival Cruise Line, Gallagher and EISS Super. Partners of the NRLW Competition are: Telstra, Harvey Norman, Chemist Warehouse, Flight Centre and Rebel.

== Activism ==
=== Same Sex Marriage ===
During the successful Australian Marriage Law Postal Survey, National Rugby League supported the Yes vote.

=== Voice to Parliament ===
National Rugby League was a supporter of the failed Voice to Parliament referendum.

== See also ==
- List of National Rugby League stadiums
- Rugby league in Australia
- New South Wales Rugby League premiership
- List of sports attendance figures – the NRL's attendance in a worldwide context
- NRL Women's Premiership – the official league for women's rugby league in Australia starting in 2018
