= The Sunday Roast =

- Genre: Sports Program
- Presented by: Tim Gilbert
- Country of origin: Australia
- Original language: English
- No. of seasons: 9

Production
- Producer: Nine's Wide World of Sports
- Running time: 60 minutes (including commercials)

Original release
- Network: Nine Network
- Release: 2005 – 2011

Related
- The Footy Show, The Sunday Footy Show

The Sunday Roast was an Australian sports talk show that dealt with the issues in the National Rugby League. Created by sports presenter Andrew Voss, it aired on the Nine Network, first screening in 2005, beginning at 11:00 am and leading into The Sunday Footy Show. In 2006, with the axing of Voss's previous show, Boots N' All, The Sunday Footy Show moved to 11:00 am, with The Sunday Roast moving to midday.

In 2012, the show, by then hosted by Tim Gilbert following Voss's controversial demotion and ultimate departure from the Nine Network, was incorporated into The Sunday Footy Show as a shorter segment rather than airing as a separate show. In 2015, the segment was dropped altogether due to its sharp decline in popularity.

== Hosts ==
=== Presenters ===
- Tim Gilbert
- Adam MacDougall
- Terry Kennedy
- Brad Fittler

==== Former Presenters ====
- Andrew Voss (2005–2011)
- Matthew Johns
- Mark Geyer (2005–2011)
- Phil Gould
- Laurie Daley
- Ray Warren

== See also ==
- List of Australian television series
- List of longest-running Australian television series
- The Sunday Footy Show (rugby league)
