= Boots 'N' All =

- Genre: Rugby League
- Developed by: BSkyB
- Presented by: Eddie Hemmings (1992–2015)
- Starring: Andrew Voss; Phil Gould; Paul Cullen; Phil Clarke; Terry O'Connor; Barrie McDermott; John Kear; Tony Rea; Jon Wells; Brian Carney; Bill Arthur; Rod Studd; Angela Powers
- Country of origin: United Kingdom
- Original language: English

Production
- Production locations: Sky Studios, London
- Running time: 60 minutes
- Production company: BSkyB

Original release
- Network: Sky Sports
- Release: 1992 – 2015

Boots 'N' All is a Sky Sports-televised rugby league, weekly magazine programme, focusing on the Super League, Championship, League 1 and amateur game that ran until the end of 2015. Originally focusing on the lighter side of the game, the programme was the foremost rugby league programme on United Kingdom television and was broadcast every week during the regular rugby league season.

== International Syndication ==
Boots 'N' All is an original British television concept, but an Australian version of the show was broadcast on the Nine Network, hosted by Andrew Voss and Phil Gould. It regularly featured chairman of Bye Supporters club Tim Andrews, and Sydney Roosters mascot Brian the Rooster.

== Presenters ==
The programme was anchored by Eddie Hemmings, Sky Sports regular Super League presenter and commentator, who was usually joined by two studio guests. They were usually two of: Paul Cullen, Phil Clarke, Terry O'Connor, Barrie McDermott, John Kear, Tony Rea, Jon Wells and Brian Carney.

Bill Arthur, Rod Studd and Angela Powers also provided featured reports.

== Content ==
The week's tries, plus player and coaching interviews. Traditionally broadcast on a Wednesday night, the programme was switched to a Thursday to incorporate live matches from the National Leagues during the 2007 season. The programme reverted to a Wednesday the following season and continued to broadcast live at 6pm, with regular repeats during the proceeding 24 hours.

The show usually featured a round up of the weeks news, followed by a discussion of the news. Highlights from a Championship match and previews of the weeks upcoming television matches were included. Furthermore, interviews with players, coaches and leading figures from the game often featured.

== Online ==
In 2007, an online version of Boots 'N' All has been available on the Sky Sports website and Sky Anytime every week during the regular Super League season. Presented by either Bill Arthur or Angela Powers, the programme consisted solely of a review of the previous weekend's Super League action, with analysis from Terry O'Connor or Barrie McDermott.

This programme now airs on Sky Sports television under the name of Super League Full Time.
