= NRL Pre-season Challenge =

National Rugby League
- Current season, competition or edition: 2027 NRL Pre-season Challenge
- Sport: Rugby league
- Founded: 2023; 3 years ago
- First season: 2023
- No. of teams: 18
- Country: Australia (16 teams); New Zealand (1 team)
- Current premiers: Parramatta Eels (1st premiership)
- Most premierships: Brisbane Broncos (2 premierships)
- Related competitions: National Rugby League

The National Rugby League (NRL) Pre-season Challenge is a two-week Australian rugby league pre-season competition held annually before the beinging of each year's National Rugby League (NRL) season.

== Background ==
The competition was introduced in 2023 in attempt to formalise pre-season fixtures. The competition also aims to encourage a more attacking style of rugby league with bonus points being awarded for teams for scoring tries, making line breaks, and making offloads. The winner of the competition receives AU$100,000 as prize money.

== Participation ==
The Pre-season Challenge is either a 16-team or an 18-team competition. In odd number years where Australia hosts the World Club Challenge, the traveling Super League team has participated in the Pre-season Challenge with the World Club Challenge being held as part of the competition. In even number years where the UK hosts the World Club Challenge, the traveling NRL team does not participate in the Pre-season Challenge. As a result of the cancellation of the 2025 World Club Challenge, the 2025 Pre-season Challenge saw 17 teams compete.

For 2027, the Pre-season Challenge saw a change to the established normal with 2027 World Club Challenge participants Sydney Roosters competing, despite pencilling in travel to England for world championship match.

== Results ==
Season	Winner	Ref.
2023	Manly Warringah Sea Eagles	
2024	Brisbane Broncos	
2025	Brisbane Broncos	
2026	Parramatta Eels	
