= The Fan (rugby league) =

- Genre: Sports
- Presented by: Andrew Voss
- Starring: Lara Pitt
- Country of origin: Australia
- Original language: English
- No. of seasons: 4

Production
- Production locations: Fox Sports Studio, Sydney, New South Wales, Australia
- Running time: 30 minutes

Original release
- Network: Fox League (2017–)
- Release: 6 March 2018 – present

The Fan is an Australian sports television series first aired on Fox League in 2018. The show is on Tuesday nights at 7:30pm.

== Presenters ==
- Andrew Voss (2018–)
- Lara Pitt (2020–)

== History ==
The Fan began in 2018 as a show designed to present the sport through the eyes of Andrew Voss, a famous rugby league commentator and personality. The show regularly hosts former and current players as well as other personalities throughout the sport.

In 2020, Lara Pitt was added as a presenter alongside Voss after League Life was dissolved.

== See also ==
- List of Australian television series
