= New South Wales Rugby League's Team of the Century =

The New South Wales Rugby League Team of the Century is a hypothetical team comprising the best players who have played for New South Wales to form a team for 1908 until 2007. Rugby league in New South Wales was initiated in 1908 with the New South Wales Rugby Football League competition, which evolved into the New South Wales Rugby League in 1984. Today, ten New South Wales clubs participate in the national competition while thirteen formerly did so.

The team was announced on 19 May 2008, ahead of the first State of Origin game in Sydney.

== The team ==
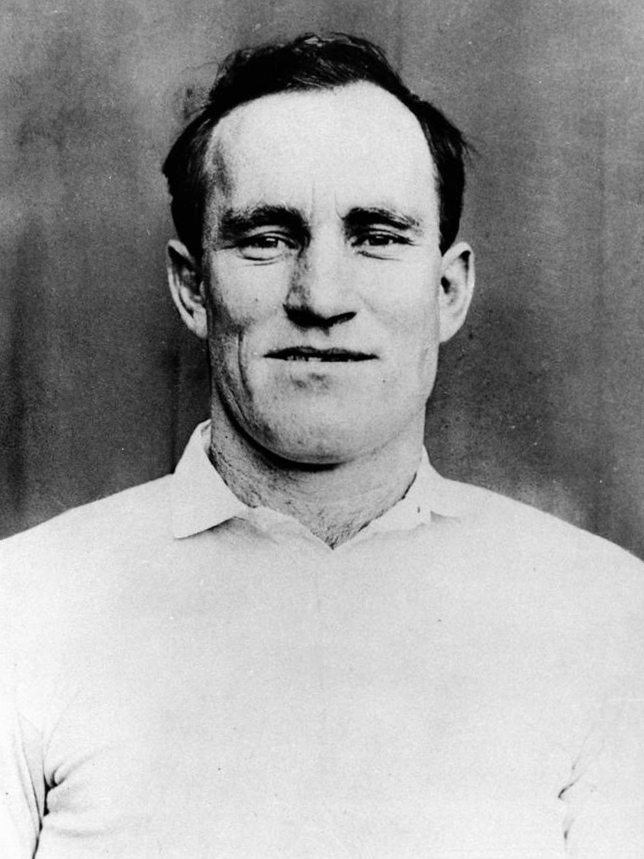
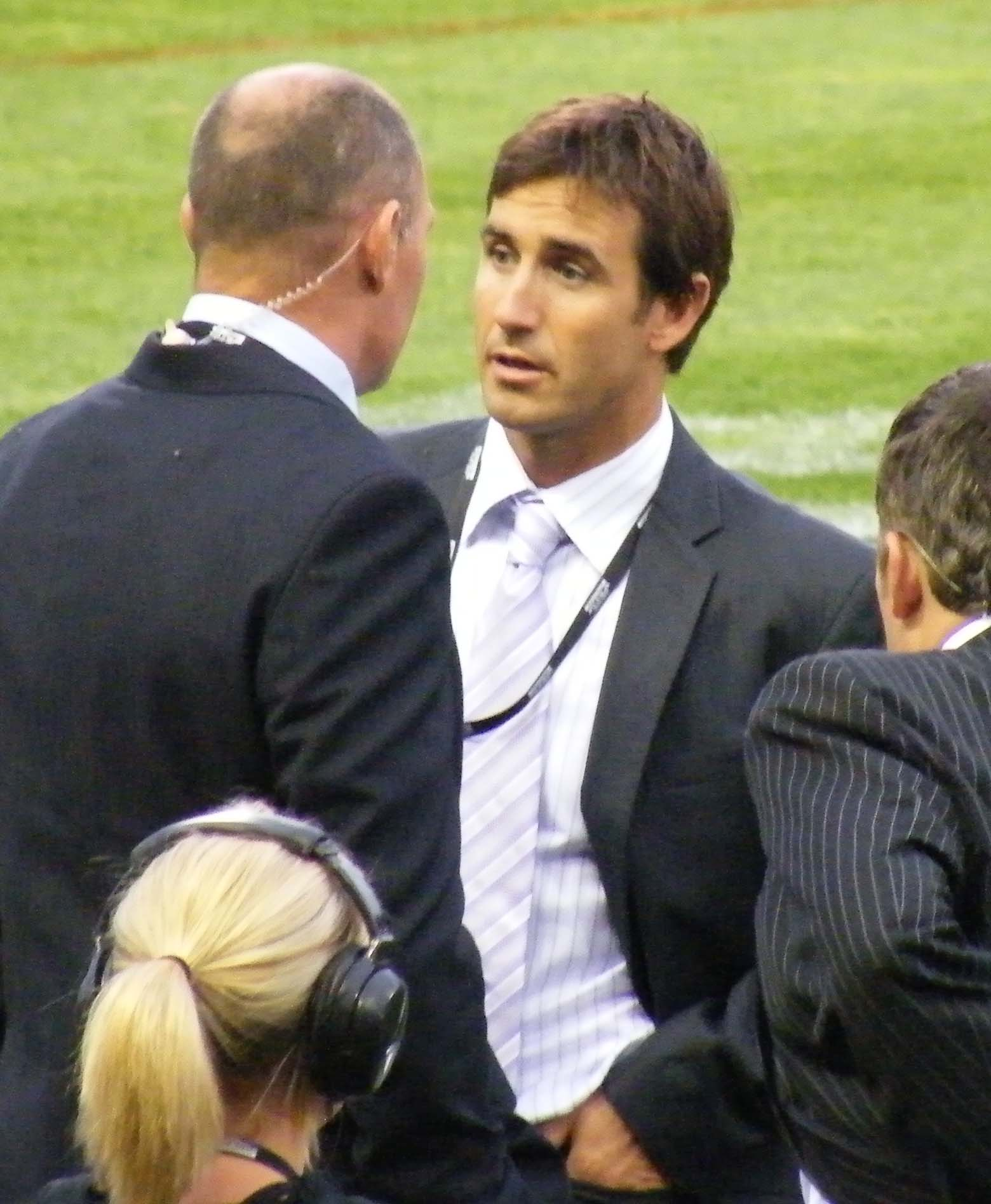
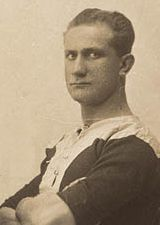
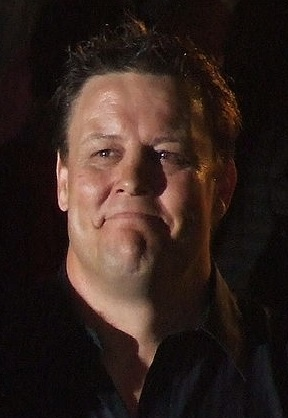
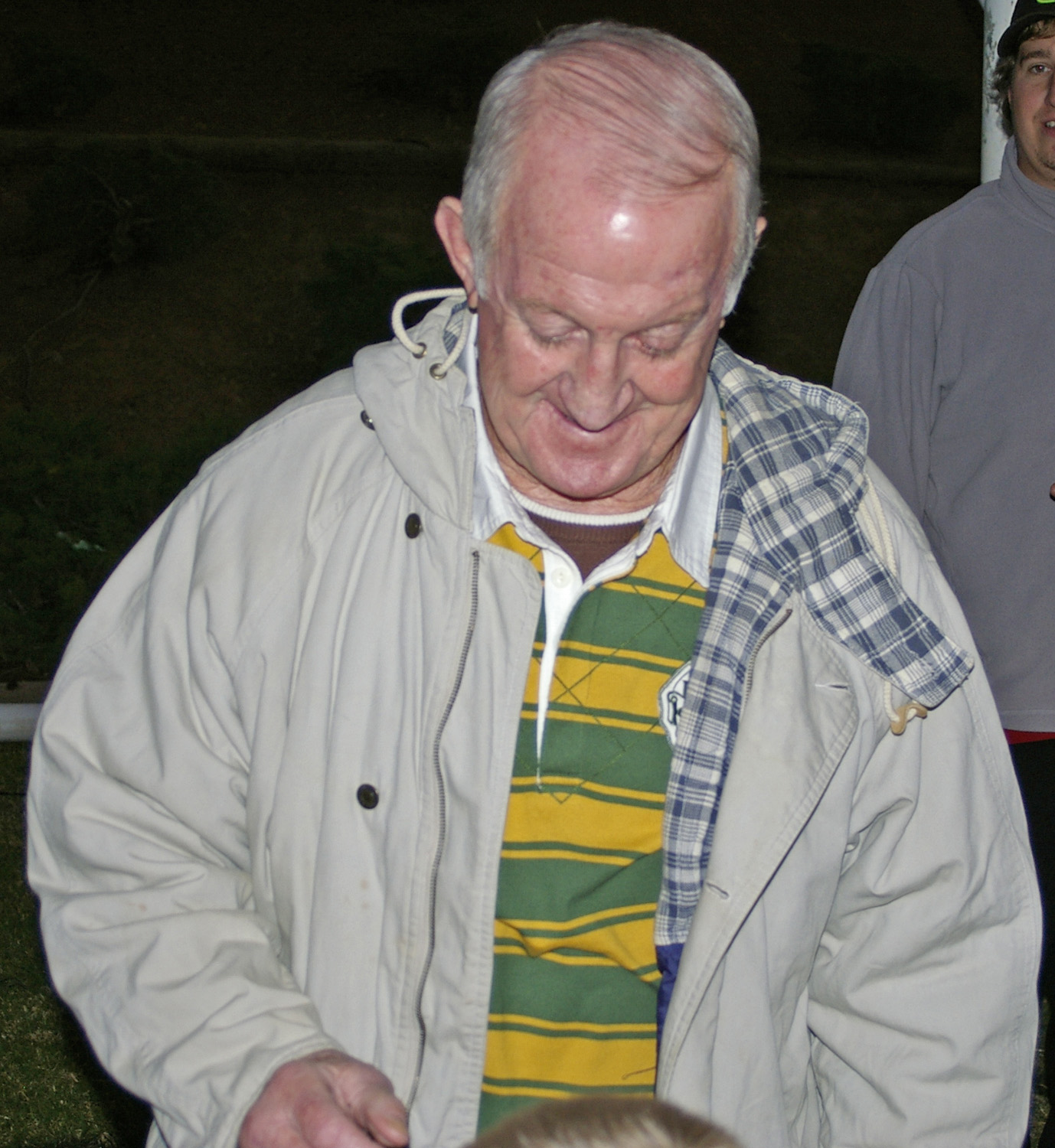
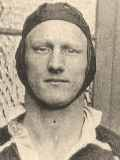
No.	Name		Position^{[A]}	Clubs^{[B]}	New South Wales^{[C]}	Australia^{[D]}	Source
1.	Clive Churchill (c)	born 21 January 1927 died 9 August 1985	Fullback	Central Newcastle, South Sydney, Brisbane Norths	36 matches (1948-1957); 27 Interstate matches 9 City vs Country matches (with City)	37 matches (1948–1956); 34 Test matches 3 World Cup matches
2.	Ken Irvine	born 5 March 1940 died 22 December 1990	Wing	North Sydney, Manly Warringah	32 matches (1959–1967); 24 Interstate matches 8 City vs Country matches (with City)	35 matches (1959–1968); 33 Test matches 2 World Cup matches
3.	Reg Gasnier	born 12 May 1939 died 11 May 2014	Centre	St. George	16 matches (1959–1967); 16 Interstate matches	39 matches (1959–1967); 36 Test matches 3 World Cup matches
4.	Graeme Langlands	born 1 September 1941 died 20 January 2018	Centre	Wollongong, St. George	34 matches (1962–1975); 33 Interstate matches 1 City vs Country match (with Country)	45 matches (1963–1975); 34 Test matches 11 World Cup matches
5.	Dally Messenger	born 12 April 1883 died 24 November 1959	Wing	Eastern Suburbs	32 matches (1907–1912); 3 Tour matches 23 Interstate matches 6 City vs Country matches (with City)	7 matches (1908–1910); 7 Test matches
6.	Bob Fulton	born 1 December 1947 died 23 May 2021	Five-eighth	Wests Wollongong, Manly-Warringah, Eastern Suburbs	16 matches (1967-1978); 16 Interstate matches	35 matches (1968-1978); 20 Test matches 15 World Cup matches 1 regular match
7.	Andrew Johns	born 19 May 1974	Halfback	Newcastle, Warrington	26 matches (1995–2005); 23 State of Origin matches 3 City vs Country matches (with Country)	27 matches (1995–2006); 18 Test matches 9 World Cup matches
8.	Frank Burge	born 14 August 1894 died 5 July 1958	Prop	Glebe, Grenfell, St. George	6 matches (1912–1926); 6 Interstate matches	13 matches (1914–1922); 13 Test matches
9.	Sandy Pearce	born 1883 died 1930	Hooker	Eastern Suburbs	6 matches (1910-1920); 6 Interstate matches	14 matches (1908-1922); 14 Test matches
10.	Glenn Lazarus	born 11 December 1965	Prop	Canberra Raiders, Brisbane Broncos, Melbourne Storm	22 matches (1989–1999); 19 State of Origin matches 3 Super League matches	22 matches (1990–1999); 15 Test matches 6 World Cup matches 1 Super League match
11.	Ron Coote	born 25 October 1944	Second-row	South Sydney, Eastern Suburbs	13 matches (1965–1975); 13 Interstate matches	23 matches (1967–1975); 13 Test matches 10 World Cup matches
12.	Norm Provan	born 18 December 1932 died 13 October 2021	Second-row	St. George	19 matches (1954–1961); 19 Interstate matches	25 matches (1954–1960); 21 Test matches 4 World Cup matches
13.	Johnny Raper	born 12 April 1939 died 9 February 2022	Lock	Newtown, St. George, Wests Newcastle, Kurri Kurri	24 matches (1959–1970); 24 Interstate matches	39 matches (1959–1968); 33 Test matches 6 World Cup matches
14.	Wally Prigg	born 17 October 1908 died 8 September 1980	Reserve	Wests Newcastle, Centrals Newcastle	35 matches (1929–1939); 35 Interstate matches	19 matches (1929–1938); 19 Test matches
15.	Dave Brown	born 4 April 1913 died 23 February 1974	Reserve	Eastern Suburbs, Warrington	19 matches (1930-1936); 19 Interstate matches	9 matches (1933-1936); 9 Test matches
16.	Steve Rogers	born 29 November 1954 died 3 January 2006	Reserve	Cronulla-Sutherland Sharks, St. George Dragons, Widnes	21 matches (1973–1982); 17 Interstate matches 4 State of Origin matches	24 matches (1973–1982); 21 Test matches 3 World Cup matches
17.	Roy Bull	born 12 June 1929 died 29 June 2004	Reserve	Manly-Warringah	26 matches (1949–1956); 26 Interstate matches	23 matches (1949–1957); 20 Test matches 3 World Cup matches
Coach^{[E]}	Jack Gibson	born 27 February 1929 died 9 May 2008		Eastern Suburbs, St. George, Newtown, South Sydney Rabbitohs, Parramatta Eels, Cronulla-Sutherland Sharks	6 matches (1989–1990) as coach 2 wins 4 losses

== Notes ==
^{A} The position the player were chosen in the Team of the Century.
^{B} The Australian clubs/teams the player played for during his career.
^{C} The number of games he played at state level for New South Wales during his career.
^{D} The number of games he played at national level for Australia during his career.
^{E} The Clubs, New South Wales and Australia columns are in terms of his coaching career, not his playing career.
