= Andrew Voss =

Australian rugby league commentator (born 1966)

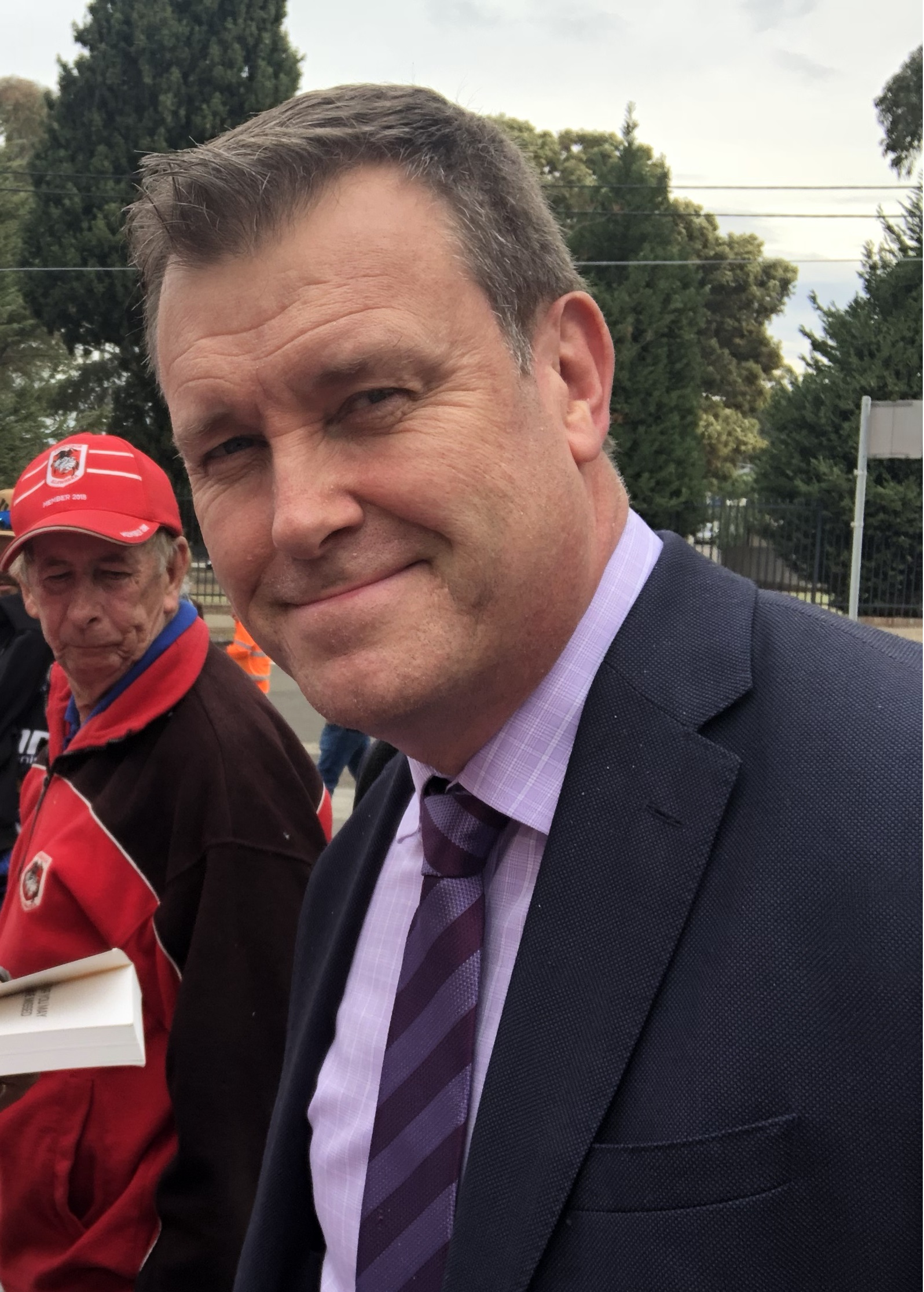
- Born: 7 September 1966 (age 60); Sydney, New South Wales, Australia
- Occupations: Journalist, sportscaster, television host
- Years active: 1988−present
- Notable work: Friday Night Football; The Footy Show; The Sunday Roast; Australia's Greatest Athlete; The Fan

Andrew Voss (born 7 September 1966) is an Australian rugby league commentator and radio and television personality who works for Fox League.

Voss previously worked for the SKY Network Television as a commentator, and at the Nine Network, including Today, NRL Footy Show, The Sunday Footy Show and The Sunday Roast.

== Career ==
In the 1990s and 2000s, Voss hosted several of the Nine Network's rugby league-related TV shows. He began appearing on The Footy Show in 1997 as a regular guest, starring in different sketches and in group discussions.

In time, he was the Nine's Network's number-two rugby league caller behind Ray Warren. In 2012, he was demoted to the number-three caller behind Ray Hadley. This occurred after Hadley strongly and personally criticised Voss for jokingly questioning on-air the likeness of a statue of Warren erected in Warren's hometown of Junee, New South Wales. Voss then sued Hadley for defamation, and the matter was settled out of court. It was revealed in 2011 that Voss had had a long-running feud with Hadley, dating back to 1994 when they both worked at Sydney radio station 2UE.

Also in 2009, Voss hosted Australia's Greatest Athlete for the Nine Network, a program which screened on Saturday afternoons.

He joined UK Premier Sports as the lead commentator for their coverage of the 2013 Rugby League World Cup, telecast in Australia on 7mate. In 2013, he also called the New Zealand Warriors' games for Sky Sport in New Zealand. Voss has made the term "let's have some fun" his own. He mainly uses the term at the start of most matches.

From 2018, Voss started a show called The Fan on Fox League, which runs on Tuesday nights.
