= List of rugby clubs in Hungary =

This is a list of rugby teams in Hungary, as per the 2011/2012 season.

== Extraliga ==
- Battai Bulldogok RK
- Budapest Exiles RFC
- Esztergomi Vitézek Rugby SE
- Fit World Gorillák RC
- Kecskeméti Atlétika és Rugby Club

== Nemzeti Bajnokság I ==
- Békéscsabai Benny Bulls RC
- Elefántok Rögbi SE
- Pécsi Indiánok SK
- Szentesi VSC 91-esek Rögbi Szakosztály

== Nemzeti Bajnokság II ==
- Ceglédi RC
- Gödöllői Ördögök RC
- Gyöngyösi Farkasok RK
- SZTE EHÖK SE

== Non-league ==
- Fehérvár RC
- Gyulai Várvédők RK
- Medvék RK
- Völgy Lovagjai Rögbi SE
