= 2009–10 Nemzeti Bajnokság II (rugby union) =

- Countries: Hungary

The 2009–10 Nemzeti Bajnokság II competition was a Hungarian domestic rugby club competition operated by the Magyar Rögbi Szövetség (MRgSz). It began on September 6, 2009 with a match between SZTE EHÖK (University of Szeged) and Szentes at the Etelka sori stadion in Szeged, and continued through to the final at the 4th Field of Széktói Stadion on June 19, 2010.

The final was contested by Szentes and Békéscsabai Benny Bulls, with the former winning 40-10.

== Competition format ==
It was divided into the Keleti (Eastern) and Nyugati (Western) sections. There were four teams in the Eastern section and five teams in the Western section. Matches in the Eastern section were played over six rounds, while matches in the Western section were played over ten rounds.

== The teams ==
Location of teams in the Nemzeti Bajnokság II 2009–10

Team	Captain	Head coach	Stadium	Capacity
Battai Bulldogok III	?	?	Százhalombattai Városi Szabadidőközpont	?
Békéscsabai Benny Bulls	?	?	Jamina pálya	?
Fehérvár	?	(Hungary) Ferenc Gyolcsos	Köfém pálya	?
Gödöllői Ördögök	?	?	?	?
Gyöngyösi Farkasok	?	(Hungary) István Laczikó	Vadas Jenõ Erdészeti Szakközépiskola sportpályája, Mátrafüred	?
Medvék	(Hungary) Gábor Mahál	(Hungary) Péter Jó-Dobronya	Cinkotai Royal Ground	?
Szentes	?	(Hungary) Attila Dobos (player-coach)	MÁV pálya	?
SZTE EHÖK	?	(Hungary) Zoltán Márton (player-coach)	Etelka sori stadion	?
Velencei Kék Cápák	?	(Hungary) Dániel Soós (player-coach)	Kastély Park	?

== Table ==
=== Eastern section ===
2009–10 Nemzeti Bajnokság II Table – Eastern section
	Club	Played	Won	Drawn	Lost	Points for	Points against	Points
1	Békéscsabai Benny Bulls	4	4	0	0	193	31	19
2	Szentes	4	2	0	2	166	90	9
3	SZTE EHÖK	4	1	0	3	74	169	5
4	Gödöllői Ördögök	4	1	0	3	55	195	4

== Table ==
=== Western section ===
2009–10 Nemzeti Bajnokság II Table – Western section
	Club	Played	Won	Drawn	Lost	Points for	Points against	Points
1	Medvék	6	5	0	1	198	84	26
2	Velencei Kék Cápák	5	3	0	2	114	106	15
3	Battai Bulldogok III	6	3	0	3	132	176	14
4	Gyöngyösi Farkasok	7	2	0	5	132	196	11
5	Fehérvár	6	2	0	4	127	141	10

== Schedule and results ==
From the official MRgSz site. Within each weekend, matches are to be listed in the following order:

1. By date.
2. If matches are held on the same day, by kickoff time.
3. Otherwise, in alphabetic order of home club.

=== Rounds 1 to 6 ===
Round 1

- 6 September, 15:00 — SZTE EHÖK 28 – 63 Szentes
- 4 October, 14:00 — Gödöllői Ördögök 12 – 68 Békéscsabai Benny Bulls

Round 2

- 13 September, 16:00 — SZTE EHÖK 7 – 68 Békéscsabai Benny Bulls
- 24 October, 15:00 — Szentes 91 – 5 Gödöllői Ördögök

Round 3

- 19 September, 15:00 — Békéscsabai Benny Bulls 31 – 12 Szentes
- 18 October, 15:00 — Gödöllői Ördögök 12 – 36 SZTE EHÖK

Round 4

- 18 April, 14:00 — Békéscsabai Benny Bulls 72 – 14 Gödöllői Ördögök
- 24 April, 16:00 — Szentes 26 – 0 SZTE EHÖK

Round 5

- 28 March, 14:00 — Gödöllői Ördögök 26 – 0 Szentes
- 28 March, 14:00 — Békéscsabai Benny Bulls 26 – 0 SZTE EHÖK

Round 6

- 4 April, 14:00 — SZTE EHÖK 30 – 64 Gödöllői Ördögök
- 9 May, 14:00 — Szentes 61 – 22 Békéscsabai Benny Bulls

=== Rounds 1 to 5 ===
Round 1

- 6 September, 16:00 — Fehérvár 55 – 5 Battai Bulldogok III
- 7 November, 15:00 — Gyöngyösi Farkasok 10 – 36 Velencei Kék Cápák

Round 2

- 12 September, 14:00 — Fehérvár 10 – 49 Medvék
- 13 September, 14:00 — Battai Bulldogok III 61 – 0 Gyöngyösi Farkasok

Round 3

- 20 September, 14:00 — Velencei Kék Cápák 35 – 7 Battai Bulldogok III
- 18 October, 15:00 — Gyöngyösi Farkasok 5 – 24 Medvék

Round 4

- 4 October, 14:00 — Gyöngyösi Farkasok 27 – 5 Fehérvár
- 4 October, 17:00 — Medvék 48 – 0 Velencei Kék Cápák

Round 5

- 25 October, 13:00 — Battai Bulldogok III 28 – 21 Medvék
- 25 October, 14:00 — Fehérvár 36 – 10 Velencei Kék Cápák

=== Rounds 6 to 10 ===
Round 6

- 14 March, 14:00 — Velencei Kék Cápák 33 – 5 Gyöngyösi Farkasok
- 14 March, 15:00 — Battai Bulldogok III 26 – 0 Fehérvár

Round 7

- 27 March, 14:00 — Gyöngyösi Farkasok 65 – 5 Battai Bulldogok III
- 27 March, 14:00 — Medvék 24 – 21 Fehérvár

Round 8

- 3 April, 14:00 — Medvék 32 – 20 Gyöngyösi Farkasok
- 27 May, 18:00 — Velencei Kék Cápák 10 – 32 Battai Bulldogok III

Round 9

- 18 April, 15:00 — Fehérvár 0 – 26 Gyöngyösi Farkasok
- 25 April, 14:00 — Velencei Kék Cápák 5 – 22 Medvék

Round 10

- 8 May, 14:00 — Medvék 35 – 24 Battai Bulldogok III
- 9 May, 15:00 — Velencei Kék Cápák 17 – 14 Fehérvár

== Playoffs ==
Quarterfinals
3E	Gödöllői Ördögök	0
2W	Velencei Kék Cápák	26
4W	Gyöngyösi Farkasok	10
1E	Békéscsabai Benny Bulls	38
4E	SZTE EHÖK	12
1W	Medvék	54
3W	Battai Bulldogok III	17
2E	Szentes	50

Semifinals
1W	Medvék	13
2E	Szentes	26
1E	Békéscsabai Benny Bulls	26
2W	Velencei Kék Cápák	7

Final
2E	Szentes	40
1E	Békéscsabai Benny Bulls	10
Third place
1W	Medvék	26
2W	Velencei Kék Cápák	19

=== Quarter-finals ===
29 May 2010
15:00

Gödöllői Ördögök	0 - 26	Velencei Kék Cápák

Gödöllő

29 May 2010
15:00

Gyöngyösi Farkasok	10 - 38	Békéscsabai Benny Bulls
Try: Sztéhló m Ughy m		Try: Pusztai 3 Lukács 2 Csernik; Con: Laurinyecz 3 Lukács

Vadas Jenõ Erdészeti Szakközépiskola sportpályája, Mátrafüred
Attendance: 40
Referee: Márton Halmosi

6 June 2010
15:00

SZTE EHÖK	12 - 54	Medvék
Try: 2 Con: 1		Try: 10; Con: 2

Etelka sori stadion, Szeged
Attendance: 200
Referee: Csaba Lukács

6 June 2010
15:00

Battai Bulldogok	17 - 50	Szentes
Try: Pénzes c Ulviczki c Con: 2/2; Pen: 1		Try: Csanki 2 Dobos 2 Baranyi; Gajdán; 1; 1 Con: Dobos (5/8)

Ráckeresztúr
Attendance: 200
Referee: Attila Jánosi

=== Semi-finals ===
13 June 2010
15:00

Medvék	13 - 26	Szentes
Try: Könnyű c Con: Solti (1/1); Pen: Solti 2		Try: Csepregi; Fekete; Kiss; Tímár; Con: Dobos (3/4)

Cinkotai Royal Ground, Budapest
Attendance: 120
Referee: Zoltán Tompai

13 June 2010
15:00

Békéscsabai Benny Bulls	26 - 7	Velencei Kék Cápák
Try: Priskin 2 Csernik; Kéki; Con: Laurinyecz (3/4)		Try: Katona c Con: Katona (1/1)

Jamina pálya, Békéscsaba
Attendance: 200
Referee: István Szundy

=== Third place playoff ===
19 June 2010
11:30

Medvék	26 - 19	Velencei Kék Cápák
Try: Solti 2 Mahál; Szalai; Con: Solti (3/4)		Try: Péter; Portik; Zsinkó; Con: 2/4

Széktói Stadion (4th Field), Kecskemét
Attendance: 200
Referee: Márton Halmosi

=== Final ===
19 June 2010
13:00

Szentes	40 - 10	Békéscsabai Benny Bulls
Try: Fekete 3 Csanki; Döme; Tímár; Con: Dobos (5/6)		Try: Kéki 2 m

Széktói Stadion (4th Field), Kecskemét
Attendance: 250
Referee: Zoltán Tompai
