= 2009–10 Nemzeti Bajnokság I (rugby union) =

The 2009–10 Nemzeti Bajnokság I competition was a Hungarian domestic rugby club competition operated by the Magyar Rögbi Szövetség (MRgSz). It began on September 5, 2009 with a match between Esztergomi Vitézek and their second team at the Ferences sporttelep in Esztergom, and continued through to the final at Széktói Stadion on June 19, 2010.

Defending champions Battai Bulldogok beat hosts Kecskeméti Atlétika és Rugby Club 16-24 to retain their title.

== Competition format ==
Matches were played over twelve rounds.

== The teams ==
Location of teams in the Nemzeti Bajnokság I 2009–10
Location of teams in the Nemzeti Bajnokság I 2009–10

Team	Captain	Head coach	Stadium	Capacity
Battai Bulldogok	?	(Ukraine) Jaroslav Kuzmenko	Százhalombattai Városi Szabadidőközpont	?
Battai Bulldogok II	?	?	Százhalombattai Városi Szabadidőközpont	?
Budapest Exiles	(Hungary) Arnold Dobos	Dave Alpert	Cinkotai Royal Ground	?
Elefántok	?	?	?	?
Esztergomi Vitézek	?	(Hungary) Lászlő Szöllősi (player-coach)	Ferences sporttelep	?
Esztergomi Vitézek II	?	?	Ferences sporttelep	?
Fit World Gorillák Szeged	?	(Hungary) Dénes Debreczeny (player-coach)	Etelka sori stadion	?
Kecskeméti Atlétika és Rugby Club	?	(Romania) Gheorghe "Gica" Vacaru	Széktói Stadion (4th Field)	?
Pécsi Indiánok	?	(Hungary) Gergely Mézes	Matáv pálya	?
Spartan Oradea	?	(Romania) Stefan Csornai	?	?

== Table ==
2009–10 Nemzeti Bajnokság I Table
	Club	Played	Won	Drawn	Lost	Points for	Points against	Points
1	Battai Bulldogok	10	9	0	1	491	82	44
2	Kecskeméti Atlétika és Rugby Club	10	8	0	2	238	94	38
3	Esztergomi Vitézek	10	6	0	4	220	109	33
4	Budapest Exiles	10	4	0	6	253	273	20
5	Spartan Oradea	10	3	0	7	168	373	16
6	Battai Bulldogok II	10	6	0	4	251	268	29
7	Fit World Gorillák Szeged	10	5	0	5	217	282	24
8	Esztergomi Vitézek II	10	4	0	6	224	236	21
9	Elefántok	10	3	0	7	180	268	15
10	Pécsi Indiánok	10	2	0	8	179	436	11

== Schedule and results ==
From the official MRgSz site. Within each weekend, matches are to be listed in the following order:

1. By date.
2. If matches are held on the same day, by kickoff time.
3. Otherwise, in alphabetic order of home club.

=== Rounds 1 to 5 ===
Round 1

- 5 September, 14:00 — Esztergomi Vitézek 22 – 20 Esztergomi Vitézek II
- 5 September, 16:00 — Fit World Gorillák Szeged 5 – 36 Kecskeméti Atlétika és Rugby Club
- 6 September, 14:00 — Battai Bulldogok 99 – 0 Battai Bulldogok II
- 10 October, 12:00 — Pécsi Indiánok 15 – 62 Budapest Exiles
- 20 March, 14:00 — Elefántok 23 – 39 Spartan Oradea

Round 2

- 12 September, 14:00 — Fit World Gorillák Szeged 50 – 32 Esztergomi Vitézek II
- 12 September, 14:00 — Kecskeméti Atlétika és Rugby Club 9 – 29 Battai Bulldogok
- 12 September, 14:00 — Spartan Oradea 17 – 22 Esztergomi Vitézek
- 12 September, 16:00 — Pécsi Indiánok 5 – 26 Elefántok

Round 3

- 19 September, 14:00 — Budapest Exiles 26 – 22 Esztergomi Vitézek
- 20 September, 14:00 — Esztergomi Vitézek II 0 – 26 Elefántok
- 27 September, 14:00 — Spartan Oradea 22 – 55 Battai Bulldogok
- 14 November, 14:00 — Battai Bulldogok II 54 – 21 Fit World Gorillák Szeged

Round 4

- 3 October, 12:00 — Esztergomi Vitézek II 12 – 33 Battai Bulldogok II
- 3 October, 13:15 — Fit World Gorillák Szeged 41 – 27 Pécsi Indiánok
- 3 October, 14:00 — Budapest Exiles 71 – 5 Spartan Oradea
- 14 November, 14:00 — Esztergomi Vitézek 6 – 3 Kecskeméti Atlétika és Rugby Club

Round 5

- 25 October, 14:00 — Elefántok 5 – 22 Battai Bulldogok II
- 25 October, 14:00 — Kecskeméti Atlétika és Rugby Club 35 – 3 Spartan Oradea
- 25 October, 14:00 — Pécsi Indiánok 35 – 22 Esztergomi Vitézek II
- 8 November, 13:00 — Battai Bulldogok 24 – 5 Budapest Exiles

=== Rounds 6 to 10 ===
Round 6

- 7 November, 12:00 — Battai Bulldogok II 36 – 14 Pécsi Indiánok
- 7 November, 14:00 — Fit World Gorillák Szeged 26 – 19 Elefántok
- 28 November, 13:15 — Budapest Exiles 0 – 17 Kecskeméti Atlétika és Rugby Club
- 12 December, 15:00 — Esztergomi Vitézek 6 – 13 Battai Bulldogok

Round 7

- 25 April, 14:00 — Budapest Exiles 51 – 15 Elefántok
- 25 April, 14:00 — Kecskeméti Atlétika és Rugby Club 26 – 10 Esztergomi Vitézek II
- 1 May, 14:00 — Spartan Oradea 45 – 7 Battai Bulldogok II
- 11 May, 18:00 — Battai Bulldogok 128 - 0 Pécsi Indiánok
- 25 May, 18:00 — Esztergomi Vitézek 26 – 0 Fit World Gorillák Szeged

Round 8

- 13 March, 14:00 — Kecskeméti Atlétika és Rugby Club 52 – 14 Budapest Exiles
- 28 March, 15:00 — Battai Bulldogok 17 – 16 Esztergomi Vitézek
- 10 April, 14:15 — Elefántok 18 – 35 Fit World Gorillák Szeged
- 25 April, 14:00 — Pécsi Indiánok 40 – 23 Battai Bulldogok II

Round 9

- 6 March, 14:00 — Budapest Exiles 5 – 62 Battai Bulldogok
- 27 March, 14:00 — Spartan Oradea 12 – 38 Kecskeméti Atlétika és Rugby Club
- 25 May, 18:30 — Battai Bulldogok II 41 – 10 Elefántok

Round 10

- 27 March, 14:00 — Fit World Gorillák Szeged 0 – 22 Battai Bulldogok II
- 4 May, 18:30 — Elefántok 7 – 37 Esztergomi Vitézek II
- 9 May, 15:00 — Esztergomi Vitézek 39 – 7 Budapest Exiles
- 22 May, 17:00 — Battai Bulldogok 52 – 3 Spartan Oradea

=== Rounds 11 and 12 ===
Round 11

- 20 March, 13:15 — Esztergomi Vitézek II 38 – 14 Pécsi Indiánok
- 3 April, 11:00 — Kecskeméti Atlétika és Rugby Club 6 – 3 Esztergomi Vitézek
- 17 April, 14:00 — Pécsi Indiánok 17 – 29 Fit World Gorillák Szeged
- 17 April, 14:00 — Spartan Oradea 22 – 12 Budapest Exiles
- 22 May, 15:00 — Battai Bulldogok II 13 – 22 Esztergomi Vitézek II

Round 12

- 20 March, 14:00 — Battai Bulldogok 12 – 16 Kecskeméti Atlétika és Rugby Club
- 10 April, 14:00 — Esztergomi Vitézek 58 – 0 Spartan Oradea
- 8 May, 13:00 — Esztergomi Vitézek II 31 – 10 Fit World Gorillák Szeged
- 8 May, 16:00 — Elefántok 31 – 12 Pécsi Indiánok

== Playoffs ==
Quarterfinals
5	Spartan Oradea	32
4	Budapest Exiles	25
8	Esztergomi Vitézek II	15
1	Battai Bulldogok	105
7	Fit World Gorillák Szeged	5
2	Kecskeméti Atlétika és Rugby Club	50
3	Esztergomi Vitézek	31
6	Battai Bulldogok II	9

Semifinals
1	Battai Bulldogok	74
5	Spartan Oradea	10
2	Kecskeméti Atlétika és Rugby Club	16
3	Esztergomi Vitézek	15

Final
2	Kecskeméti Atlétika és Rugby Club	16
1	Battai Bulldogok	24
Third place
3	Esztergomi Vitézek	81
5	Spartan Oradea	10

=== Quarter-finals ===
29 May 2010
10:00

Spartan Oradea	32 – 25	Budapest Exiles
Try: 6 Con: 1		Try: 5

Oradea
Attendance: 50
Referee: Csaba Priskin

29 May 2010
18:00

Esztergomi Vitézek II	15 - 105	Battai Bulldogok
Pen: Suiogan 4 Drop: Suiogan		Try: Prakter 3 Tóth 3 Belencsák 2 Garin 2 Surman; Baksza; Bán; Janotka; Kendi; Floroiu; Lakatos; Con: Janotka (8/17)

Ferences sporttelep, Esztergom
Attendance: 500
Referee: Attila Jánosi

29 May 2010
15:00

Fit World Gorillák Szeged	5 - 50	Kecskeméti Atlétika és Rugby Club
Try: Takács m		Try: Németh 2 Réfi 2 Bartus; Moftei; Vacaru; Zidarescu; Con: Vacaru 3 Nagyhegyesi 2

Etelka sori stadion, Szeged
Attendance: 50
Referee: Zoltán Tompai

29 May 2010
17:00

Esztergomi Vitézek	31 - 9	Battai Bulldogok II
Try: Juhász 2 Szöllősi 2 Marosi; Con: Collet (3/5)		Pen: Farkasinszky 2 Teisenhoffer

Ferences sporttelep, Esztergom
Attendance: 500
Referee: Tamás Szeidl

=== Semi-finals ===
12 June 2010
14:00

Battai Bulldogok	74 - 10	Spartan Oradea
Try: 14; Con: 2		Try: 2

Százhalombattai Városi Szabadidőközpont, Százhalombatta
Attendance: 200
Referee: Tamás Böröndi

12 June 2010
18:00

Kecskeméti Atlétika és Rugby Club	16 - 15	Esztergomi Vitézek
Try: Dániel Mátyás Tóth c Con: Moftei (1/1); Pen: Moftei 3		Try: Teodorescu 2 Con: Bíró (1/2); Pen: Bíró

Széktói Stadion (4th Field), Kecskemét
Attendance: 550
Referee: Csaba Priskin

=== Third place playoff ===
19 June 2010
21:00

Esztergomi Vitézek	81 - 10	Spartan Oradea
Try: Böhm 2 Haspel 2 Teodorescu 2 Bíró; Fehér; Madarász; Marosi; Nagy; Suiogan; Szöllösi; Con: Bíró (8/13)		Try: 1 Con: 1 Pen: 1

Széktói Stadion (4th Field), Kecskemét
Referee: Tamás Szeidl

=== Final ===
19 June 2010
17:30

Kecskeméti Atlétika és Rugby Club	16 - 24	Battai Bulldogok
Try: Vacaru c Con: Moftei (1/1); Pen: Moftei 3		Try: Dobai 2 Glushenko; Lebegy; Con: Janotka (2/4)

Széktói Stadion (Main Field), Kecskemét
Attendance: 1,800
Referee: Marcin Zeszutek (Poland)
