= 2010–11 Nemzeti Bajnokság II (rugby union) =

- Countries: Hungary
- Matches played: 11
- Attendance: 1,100 (average 100 per match)
- Tries scored: 109 (average 9.9 per match)
- Top point scorer: (Hungary) Gergő Solti (64)
- Top try scorer: (United States) Timothy Helmich (9)

The 2010-11 Nemzeti Bajnokság II competition is a Hungarian domestic rugby club competition operated by the Magyar Rögbi Szövetség (MRgSz). It began on September 18, 2010 with a match between Medvék and Velencei Kék Cápák at the Cinkotai Royal Ground in Budapest, and continued through to the final in 2011.

== Competition format ==
It consists of one section with six teams. Matches are played over ten rounds.

== The teams ==
Location of teams in the Nemzeti Bajnokság II 2009–10

Team	Captain	Head coach	Stadium	Capacity
Békéscsabai Benny Bulls	?	(Hungary) Csaba Lukacs	Jamina pálya	?
Gödöllői Ördögök	?	(Hungary) Márton Juhász (player-coach)	?	?
Gyöngyösi Farkasok	?	(Hungary) Péter Gyuris (player-coach)	Mátra Szakképzõ Iskola sportpályája, Mátrafüred	?
Medvék	(Hungary) Gábor Mahál	(Hungary) Péter Jó-Dobronya	Cinkotai Royal Ground	?
SZTE EHÖK	(Hungary) Gábor Ábrahám	(Hungary) Zoltán Márton (player-coach)	Szeged Városi Stadion	?
Velencei Kék Cápák	?	(Hungary) Dániel Soós (player-coach)	Kastély Park	?

== Table ==
2010-11 Nemzeti Bajnokság II Table
	Club	Played	Won	Drawn	Lost	Points for	Points against	Points
1	Medvék	5	4	0	1	265	67	20
2	Velencei Kék Cápák	4	4	0	0	214	31	20
3	Békéscsabai Benny Bulls	5	3	0	2	111	117	14
4	Gyöngyösi Farkasok	5	1	0	4	81	129	6
5	SZTE EHÖK	3	1	0	2	60	141	6
6	Gödöllői Ördögök	4	0	0	4	0	246	-2
