= Hungarian Rugby Player of the Year =

The Hungarian Rugby Player of the Year (Az év rögbijátékosa) is awarded to the player voted the best in Hungary.

== History ==
It was first awarded in 1992 with László Kump of Elefántok as the inaugural winner. Since 2006 there is also given an award to the best female player with Petra Pölöskei of Fehérvár receiving the first award.

== Winners ==
Year	Men's XV winner	Women's 7's winner	Men's 7's winner	Women's 7's U18 winner
1992	László Kump (Elefántok)			
1993	Imre Horváth (Elefántok)			
1994	Attila Kardos (Miskolc)			
1995	Rolf Stub (Budapest Exiles)			
1996	Gábor Makai (GAMF)			
1997	Mihály Hoffman (Battai Bulldogok)			
1998	Pál Túri (Kecskeméti Atlétika és Rugby Club)			
1999	Zoltán Koller (Esztergomi Vitézek)			
2000	Miklós Dobai (Battai Bulldogok)			
2001	István Tóth (Elefántok)			
2002	Zsolt Nagy (Esztergomi Vitézek)			
2003	Viktor Madarász (Elefántok)			
2004	Károly Suiogan (Esztergomi Vitézek)			
2005	Zoltán Heckel (Esztergomi Vitézek)			
2006	Pál Túri (Kecskeméti Atlétika és Rugby Club)	Petra Pölöskei (Fehérvár)		
2007	Károly Suiogan (Esztergomi Vitézek)	Eszter Pap (Fehérvár)		
2008	Péter Novák (Esztergomi Vitézek)			
2009	Achilles Gyurcsik (Battai Bulldogok)	Mária Gyolcsos (Fehérvár)		
2010	Gabriel Garin (Battai Bulldogok)	Mária Gyolcsos (Fehérvár)		
2011	Máté Tóth HUN XV(Battai Bulldogok)	Csilla Fehér HUN 7's(Battai Bulldogok)	Gergő Gáspár HUN 7's(Pécsi Indiánok)	Edina Péter HUN 7's U18(Agárd Angles)
2012	Gregoire Collet HUN XV(Esztergomi Vitézek)	Csilla Fehér HUN 7's(Battai Bulldogok)	László Teisenhoffer HUN 7's(Battai Bulldogok)	

== Trivia ==
- The Miskolc club, for which Attila Kardos played, has since gone out of existence.
