= Hungary national rugby union team =

National rugby union team

Hungary
- Union: Hungarian Rugby Union
- Head coach: Finlay Harrison
First colours	Second colours

World Rugby ranking
- Current: 86 (as of 29 June 2026)
- Highest: 64 (23 November 2020)
- Lowest: 86 (29 June 2026)

First international
- Hungary 3–7 East Germany (Érd, Hungary; 22 July 1990)

Biggest win
- Bulgaria 5–67 Hungary (Sofia, Bulgaria; 5 October 2013)

Biggest defeat
- Hungary 7–86 Austria (Budapest, Hungary; 4 April 2026)

The Hungary national rugby union team is governed by the Hungarian Rugby Union. They have yet to qualify for the Rugby World Cup, although they have entered qualifiers for all the tournaments from the 1995 edition onwards. They compete annually in the European Nations Cup, currently in Division 2C.

The national side is ranked 79th in the world (as of 4 November 2024).

== History ==
Hungary played their first official match against East Germany in Érd in 1990, losing 3–7, but they played a number of unofficial matches prior to this, mainly against a likewise unofficial Austrian team, including a match in Győr on 1 May 1983.

Hungary first entered the qualifiers for the 1995 World Cup in 1993, being at the wrong end of an 8–67 scoreline against Israel. Things went better in the 1999 qualifying rounds, where they beat Lithuania and Luxembourg, but lost to Andorra and Sweden.

In the 2003 qualifiers, they won against Andorra and Bulgaria, but lost to Bosnia, Yugoslavia (as Serbia was then still known), and Switzerland. The 2007 qualifying was their worst performance to date, losing all four matches played, including a 9–63 thumping by Spain.

== Current squad ==
Squad for opening 2023-24 Rugby Europe Conference match against Austria.

- Caps & age not updated.
- Head coach: Richard Roberts

Note: Flags indicate national union for the club/province as defined by World Rugby.

Player	Position	Date of birth (age)	Caps	Club/province
Tamás Szabó	Prop	{{{age}}}	{{{caps}}}	(Hungary) Fit World Gorillák RC
Áron Erdélyi	Hooker	{{{age}}}	{{{caps}}}	(Hungary) Budapest Exiles RFC
Dániel Stevens	Prop	{{{age}}}	{{{caps}}}	(Hungary) Budapest Exiles RFC
Zsombor Kade	Lock	{{{age}}}	{{{caps}}}	(France) Rouen Normandie Rugby
Alex Hernádi	Lock	{{{age}}}	{{{caps}}}	(Hungary) Budapest Exiles RFC
Hunor Vodicska	Flanker	{{{age}}}	{{{caps}}}	(Hungary) Esztergomi Vitézek Rugby SE
Mózes Gyurcsik	Flanker	{{{age}}}	{{{caps}}}	(Hungary) Battai Bulldogok RK
Thomas Ducrocq	Number 8	{{{age}}}	{{{caps}}}	(France) FC Lourdes
Márton Sacaze	Scrum-half	10 March 1997 (age 29)	{{{caps}}}	(Switzerland) Servette RC
Marc Koteczky	Fly-half	{{{age}}}	{{{caps}}}	(England) Shelford Rugby Club
Erik Csapó	Wing	{{{age}}}	{{{caps}}}	(Hungary) Esztergomi Vitézek Rugby SE
Márk Stiglmayer	Centre	{{{age}}}	{{{caps}}}	(Hungary) Esztergomi Vitézek Rugby SE
Erhard Sovány	Centre	{{{age}}}	{{{caps}}}	(Hungary) Esztergomi Vitézek Rugby SE
Erik Szalma	Wing	{{{age}}}	{{{caps}}}	(Hungary) Esztergomi Vitézek Rugby SE
Kornél Kiss	Fullback	{{{age}}}	{{{caps}}}	(Hungary) Esztergomi Vitézek Rugby SE
István Szabó	Prop	{{{age}}}	{{{caps}}}	(Hungary) Honfoglalók Rugby
Sámuel Pataki	Hooker	{{{age}}}	{{{caps}}}	(Hungary) Battai Bulldogok RK
Dávid Őrsi	Prop	{{{age}}}	{{{caps}}}	(Hungary) Fehérvár RC
Szabolcs Szőke	Lock	{{{age}}}	{{{caps}}}	(Hungary) Honfoglalók Rugby
Dániel Talpai	Flanker	{{{age}}}	{{{caps}}}	(Hungary) Fit World Gorillák RC
Imre Szóda	Wing	{{{age}}}	{{{caps}}}	(Hungary) Esztergomi Vitézek Rugby SE
Dániel Dragonya	Scrum-half	{{{age}}}	{{{caps}}}	(Hungary) Battai Bulldogok RK
Bertalan Koltai	Wing	{{{age}}}	{{{caps}}}	(Hungary) Fit World Gorillák RC

== Strip ==
The badge on the shirt derives from the Csodaszarvas, a mythological stag that led the ancient Hungarian people to the Pannonian Basin.

In the Austria match of 1983, they played in presumably white jerseys with either a black or dark green hoop, black shorts, and either black or dark green socks with white tops. After the MRgSz was established, the team reverted to the flag colors of red, white, and green, with the current strip consisting of red shirts and shorts and green socks.

== Grounds ==
Hungary plays its home games at the Budapest Rugby Center in Kincsem Park. Most games, before the new stadium was built in 2019, used to be held in Esztergom.

== Record ==
Below is a table of the representative rugby matches played by a Hungary national XV at test level up until 4 April 2026, updated after match with Austria.

Opponent	Played	Won	Lost	Drawn	% Won
Andorra	6	1	5	0	16.67%
Armenia	1	0	1	0	0%
Austria	17	10	7	0	58.82%
Bosnia and Herzegovina	6	5	1	0	83.33%
Bulgaria	9	8	1	0	88.89%
Croatia	5	0	5	0	0%
Cyprus	4	0	4	0	0%
Czech Republic	4	0	4	0	0%
Denmark	5	2	3	0	40%
East Germany	1	0	1	0	0%
Estonia	1	1	0	0	100%
Finland	1	1	0	0	100%
Gibraltar	2	0	2	0	0%
Israel	4	1	3	0	25%
Latvia	7	1	6	0	14.29%
Lithuania	8	2	6	0	25%
Luxembourg	5	2	3	0	40%
Malta	1	0	1	0	0%
Moldova	4	1	3	0	25%
Monaco	1	0	1	0	0%
Norway	7	7	0	0	100%
Serbia	2	1	1	0	50%
Serbia and Montenegro	2	1	1	0	50%
Slovakia	1	1	0	0	100%
Slovenia	14	5	9	0	35.71%
Spain	1	0	1	0	0%
Sweden	4	0	4	0	0%
Switzerland	1	0	1	0	0%
Ukraine	4	0	3	1	0%
Yugoslavia	1	0	1	0	0%
Total	123	44	78	1	35.77%

== See also ==
- Rugby union in Hungary
- Hungary national rugby sevens team
