= Kupa (disambiguation) =

The Kupa is a river in Croatia and Slovenia.

Kupa may also refer to:

- The Kupa (Lėvuo), a river in Lithuania
- The Kupa (Kuta), a river in Siberian Russia
- Kupa, Hungary, a village
- Kupa Synagogue, located in Kraków, Poland
- Kupa language, a language of Nigeria
- KUPA, a call sign held from 2004 to 2020 by a radio station now called KHXM (1370 AM), licensed to serve Pearl City, Hawaii, United States
- Mihály Kupa (born 1941), Hungarian politician
- Litsea garciae, a tree native to Southeast Asia locally called kupa
- Kupa, Croatia, a village near Delnice

== See also ==
- Magyar Kupa (disambiguation), several Hungarian sports competitions
- Koopa (disambiguation)
- Kuppa (disambiguation)
