= List of Kecskeméti TE managers =

Kecskeméti TE is a professional football club based in Kecskemét, Hungary.

== Managers ==
Manager	Nationality	From	To	P	W	D	L	GF	GA	Win	Honours	Notes
János Magó	Hungary	1937										
Ernő Singer		1938										
János Steiner		1947										
József Fehérvári		1948										
Ferenc Horváth		1949										
János Nagy		1951										
Imre Serényi		1952										
János Horváth		1952										
Gyula Dragollovich		1952										
Károly Kósa		1953										
Gyula Dragollovich		1953										
Béla Jánosi		1953										
Jenő Weisz		1957										
József Garamszegi		1958										
Jenő Hauser		1961										
Károly Kósa		1961										
Ferenc Molnár		1963										
József Fejes		1965										
András Dombóvári		1965	1966									
Jozsef Nemeth		1966										
Antal Lyka		1967										
Béla Varga		1971	1973									
Ferenc Máté		1975										
Rezső Bánáti		1976										
József Bánhidi		1976										
István Vereb		1978										
Gyula Czimmmermann		1983										
Antal Tóth		1984	1991									
József Linka		1994	1997									
Tibor Gracza		1999										
László Nagy		1999	November 2001									
Ferenc Gabala		November 2001	May 2002									
József Kiprich		May 2002	July 2003									
Ioan Patrascu	Romania	1 July 2003	1 October 2003									
Tibor Gracza		October 2003	April 2004									
Robert Glázer		13 April 2004	18 September 2004									
György Gálhidi		18 September 2004	28 September 2004									
Zoltán Leskó		September 2004	March 2005									
Tibor Gracza		March 2005	November 2005									
Ioan Patrascu	Romania		November 2005									
László Török		January 2006	September 2006									
István Varga		September 2006	January 2007									
Tamás Nagy		19 January 2007	12 April 2007									
Tomislav Sivić	Serbia	1 August 2007	21 October 2009									
Aurél Csertői		28 October 2009	8 April 2010									
István Urbányi		8 April 2010	27 September 2010									
István Szabó (interim)		27 September 2010	13 October 2010									
Tomislav Sivić		13 October 2010	23 November 2011									
István Szabó		13 December 2011	30 June 2012									
László Török		1 July 2012	17 September 2012									
István Szabó (interim)		17 September 2012	28 September 2012									
Ferenc Horváth		28 September 2012	24 June 2013	22	11	8	5	34	27			
Balázs Bekő		24 June 2013	1 June 2015	64	20	17	27	72	102			
István Szabó		1 June 2021	15 October 2024	125	60	28	37	203	138			
Zoltán Gera		16 October 2024	26 August 2025	30	5	11	14	30	46			
Krisztián Tímár		27 August 2025	present									
