= List of Kecskeméti TE seasons =

Kecskeméti TE is a professional Hungarian football club based in Kecskemét, Hungary.

== Key ==
Nemzeti Bajnokság I

- Pld = Matches played
- W = Matches won
- D = Matches drawn
- L = Matches lost
- GF = Goals for
- GA = Goals against
- Pts = Points
- Pos = Final position

Hungarian football league system

- NBI = Nemzeti Bajnokság I
- NBII = Nemzeti Bajnokság II
- NBIII = Nemzeti Bajnokság III
- MBI = Megyei Bajnokság I

Magyar Kupa

- F = Final
- SF = Semi-finals
- QF = Quarter-finals
- R16 = Round of 16
- R32 = Round of 32
- R64 = Round of 64
- R128 = Round of 128

UEFA

- F = Final
- SF = Semi-finals
- QF = Quarter-finals
- Group = Group stage
- PO = Play-offs
- QR3 = Third qualifying round
- QR2 = Second qualifying round
- QR1 = First qualifying round
- PR = Preliminary round

Winners	Runners-up	Third	Promoted	Relegated

== Seasons ==
Season		League									Cup	UEFA		Manager	Ref.
Season	Tier	Div	Pld	W	D	L	GF	GA	Pts.	Pos.	Cup	Competition	Result	Manager	Ref.
1997–98	2	NBII	38	13	7	18	36	50	46	14th		Did not qualify			
1998–99	2	NBII	38	4	7	27	32	81	19	19th		Did not qualify			
1999–00	2	NBII	38	20	6	12	60	39	66	4th		Did not qualify			
2001–02	2	NBII	32	10	9	13	55	60	39	10th		Did not qualify			
2002–03	2	NBII	34	13	9	12	57	42	48	10th		Did not qualify			
2003–04	2	NBII	34	10	12	12	33	33	42	12th		Did not qualify			
2004–05	2	NBII	26	11	7	8	45	36	40	4th		Did not qualify			
2005–06	2	NBII	28	9	11	8	46	49	38	9th		Did not qualify			
2006–07	2	NBII	30	10	10	10	46	46	40	8th		Did not qualify			
2007–08	2	NBII ↑	30	24	3	3	74	23	75	1st	R32	Did not qualify		(Serbia) Sivić	
2008–09	1	NBI	30	14	6	10	55	44	48	5th	QF	Did not qualify		(Serbia) Sivić	
2009–11	1	NBI	30	10	7	13	50	56	37	10th	R16	Did not qualify		(Serbia) Sivić, (Hungary) Csertői, (Hungary) Urbányi	
2010–11	1	NBI	30	11	3	16	51	56	36	12th	W	Did not qualify		(Hungary) Urbányi, (Serbia) Sivić	
2011–12	1	NBI	30	13	6	11	47	39	45	5th	R16	Europa League	2QR	(Serbia) Sivić, (Hungary) Török	
2012–13	1	NBI	30	12	8	10	42	42	44	7th	R16	Did not qualify		(Hungary) Török, (Hungary) Horváth	
2013–14	1	NBI	30	9	9	12	36	51	36	10th	R16	Did not qualify		(Hungary) Horváth, (Hungary) Bekő	
2014–15	1	NBI ↓	30	10	8	12	30	39	38	9th	R32	Did not qualify		(Hungary) Bekő	
2018–19	3	NBIII	30	9	12	9	36	35	39	9th	R128	Did not qualify		(Hungary) Szabó	
2019-2020	3	NBIII	19	5	5	9	24	26	20	11th	R128	Did not qualify		(Serbia) Kuntić, (Hungary) Gombos	
2020–21	3	NBIII ↑	38	24	8	6	90	32	80	2nd	R64	Did not qualify		(Hungary) Gombos	
2021–22	2	NBII ↑	38	23	8	7	75	36	77	2nd	R16	Did not qualify		(Hungary) Szabó	
2022–23	1	NBI	33	15	12	6	48	32	57	2nd	R32	Did not qualify		(Hungary) Szabó	
2023–24	1	NBI	33	13	6	14	45	45	45	6th	QF	Conference League	2QR	(Hungary) Szabó	
2024–25	1	NBI ↓	33	4	13	16	31	53	25	12th	R32	Did not qualify		(Hungary) Szabó, (Hungary) Gera	
2025–26	2	NBII	30	16	3	11	49	39	51	3rd		Did not qualify			

Notes

- Note 1: On 4 May 2020, the 2019-2020 NB III season was suspended due to the COVID-19 pandemic after 19 rounds.
