= RC Spartan Oradea =

Romanian rugby union club, based in Oradea

Spartan Oradea
- Full name: Rugby Club Spartan Oradea
- Nickname: Spartanii (Spartans)
- Founded: 2005; 21 years ago
- Location: Oradea, Romania
- Ground: Stadionul Universității (Egyetemi Stadion) (Capacity: 500)
- President: (Romania) Mircea Țucudean
- Coach: (Romania) Ștefan Csornai (Former Coach)
- League: DHL Extraliga

RC Spartan Oradea (also known as RC Nágyvarad Spartans in Hungary) is an amateur Romanian rugby union club based in Oradea. They currently play in the Nemzeti Bajnokság I of Hungary however, after having played in Romanian leagues until 2008. This makes them the second club outside of Hungary to play in the Hungarian league, after Slovakia`s Slovan Bratislava who first played in the tournament back in 2005.

== History ==
The club was founded in 2005 by Mircea Țucudean, a former soldier and bodyguard who himself had played rugby while at the University of Oradea. Prior to the foundation of the club, the rugby team at the university managed to reach Divizia A, the second level of rugby in Romania, before disbanding a few years later.

In 2008, the club withdrew from the Romanian league to play in neighboring country Hungary, citing financial reasons and inconsistencies in refereeing. The Hungarian Rugby Union (MRgSz) welcomed them with open arms, as they saw the move as an attempt to help improve the quality of rugby in their country.

In 2011, Spartan Oradea promoted from the Nemzeti Bajnokság I the second division of rugby union in Hungary to the first division of rugby union in Hungary which was the DHL Extraliga.
