= Magyar Kupa (disambiguation) =

Magyar Kupa is the Hungarian cup competition for football clubs.

Magyar Kupa may also refer to:

- Magyar Kupa (men's handball)
- Magyar Kupa (women's handball)
- Magyar Kupa (men's basketball)
- Magyar Kupa (women's basketball)
- Magyar Kupa (men's volleyball)
- Magyar Kupa (women's volleyball)
- Magyar Kupa (men's water polo)
- Magyar Kupa (women's water polo)
- Magyar Kupa (rugby)
