= Nemzeti Bajnokság II (disambiguation) =

Nemzeti Bajnokság II may refer to:

- Nemzeti Bajnokság II, second tier association football in Hungary
- Nemzeti Bajnokság II (rugby union)
- Nemzeti Bajnokság II (men's handball)
