= Magyar Kupa (rugby union) =

The Magyar Kupa is a rugby union cup competition in Hungary.

== History ==
The first final was contested in 1991 and won by Zöld Sólymok (Green Falcons), a possible forerunner of Elefántok.

== Results ==
Year	Champion	Score	Runner-up	Place
1991	Zöld Sólymok RK
1992
1993
1994
1995
1996
1997	Battai Bulldogok RK
1998	Elefántok Rögbi SE
1999	Elefántok Rögbi SE
2000	Esztergomi Vitézek Rugby SE
2001	Esztergomi Vitézek Rugby SE
2002	Esztergomi Vitézek Rugby SE
2003	Esztergomi Vitézek Rugby SE
2004	Esztergomi Vitézek Rugby SE
2005	Esztergomi Vitézek Rugby SE
2006	Esztergomi Vitézek Rugby SE
2007	Esztergomi Vitézek Rugby SE
2008	Esztergomi Vitézek Rugby SE	32-5	Kecskeméti Atlétika és Rugby Club	Széktói Stadion (4th Field), Kecskemét
August 30, 2009	Esztergomi Vitézek Rugby SE	25-15	Battai Bulldogok RK	Ferences sporttelep, Esztergom
