= 2018–19 Magyar Kupa (disambiguation) =

The 2018–19 Magyar Kupa was the 79th season of Hungary's annual knock-out cup football competition.

2018–19 Magyar Kupa may also refer to:

- 2018–19 Magyar Kupa (men's handball)
- 2018–19 Magyar Kupa (women's handball)
- 2018–19 Magyar Kupa (men's volleyball)
