= Kecskeméti TE =

Hungarian football club

Kecskemét
- Full name: Kecskeméti Testedző Egyesület
- Short name: KTE
- Founded: 11 June 1911; 115 years ago
- Ground: Széktói Stadion
- Capacity: 6,300
- Owner: Horváth Építőmester private limited company
- Manager: Krisztián Tímár
- League: NB II
- 2025–26: 3rd
- Website: kecskemetite.hu
Home colours	Away colours	Third colours

Kecskeméti Testedző Egyesület, commonly known as Kecskeméti TE or simply Kecskemét, is a sports club based in Kecskemét, Hungary. It is most famous for its football section which competes in the Nemzeti Bajnokság II from 2025–26, the second tier of Hungarian football after relegation from Nemzeti Bajnokság I in 2024–25. Kecskeméti TE's highest achievement to-date is winning the Magyar Kupa in the 2010–11 season, and gaining entry into the Europa League. The team won a silver medal right after its promotion back to the first league in 2022–23, earning the right to compete in the Europa Conference League qualification matches.

== History ==
=== Early years ===
A local newspaper of Kecskemét wrote on 6 May 1871, "an elderly citizen wants to establish a company of men to play soccer in our city, doing exercises twice a week, practicing throws and running." In 1904, the first football match was played in Kecskemét, when the Budapest III. District High School defeated the team of local Piarist High School. In May 1910, the first football game between proper clubs was held in the town.

Kecskeméti TE was founded on 11 June 1911, and attracted primarily local workers as players in the early years. The first managing director was Ferenc Kéry. The first colours of the club were red and green. The current purple and white colours have been in use since 1913. The first match was played on 15 August 1911, in which Kecskeméti TE lost to KSC by 1–0. The second match was won 5–1 against Szolnoki MÁV.

On 29 July 1913, Kecskeméti TE merged with the other team from Kecskemét, KSC. On 11 April 1926, the team's stadium was inaugurated, and the first match was played against the rival Ceglédi RC. During World War I, the mainly consisted of under-18 players. From 1945 the team played its matches near the local railway station.

=== Under Socialism ===
In the 1946–47 season the team was promoted to the Nemzeti Bajnokság II (the second division) for the first time in the history of the club. On 28 June 1949, the two teams of Kecskemét, KTE and KAC were merged. The new name of the team became KszTE, playing in red and blue. Máté Fenyvesi, later a key player of Ferencváros, started his career in KTE. On 11 January 1954, the team changed its name to Kecskeméti Kinizsi, and got its original colours back on 2 December 1956.

In 1961, a torchlight parade was presented to celebrate that the club's 50-year anniversary. In 1964, the team fell back to the county-level championship, but in 1966, it was back in the third tier. KSC, the other club in town, was founded in 1972. The two teams became archrivals in the second and third league, their "derby" was always a big event for the town.

=== After the regime change ===
In 1990, Antal Tóth coached the team to win their group in NB III, but the club was not able to stay in the Second Division.

In 1995, for the third time KTE got promoted to the second league, once again winning the NB III. This was trainer József Linka's era, the newly promoted team even reached first-place in the autumn. The club moved its home grounds to Széktói Stadion.

In 1999, after the merger between KTE and KSC, the new club by the name of KFC was created, thanks to a known entrepreneur and main sponsor, János Jámbor. Under head coach László Nagy, the team came close to getting promoted to NB I in the 2000–01 season, but the hopes were futile. Jámbor lest Kecskemét football, and transferred the right to play to a revived Vasas.

In 1998, under the club president, István Pinczés, the KTE name was given back to the team, starting in the third tier again.

=== 2000s ===
The first years of the third millennium brought confusion and many troubles to the football team in Kecskemét. However, this ended in 2006 when Pál Rózsa and János Versegi became the chairmen of KTE. They started to build a strong and successful club, with great support from Dr. Gábor Zombor, then-mayor of Kecskemét. The promotion to NB I was finally achieved in 2008, and KTE became the first football club from the city of Kecskemét to play in the Hungarian first league.

The first season in the top Hungarian league was considered successful for the team, finishing fifth in the Nemzeti Bajnokság I 2008–09.

=== 2010s ===
Kecskemét entered the 2010–11 Magyar Kupa season against Békéscsaba on 22 September 2010. The match ended with 2–1 victory for Kecskemét at the Kórház utcai Stadion. On 27 October 2010, Kecskemét beat Tiszakanyár 3–0 in the round of 32 of the 2010–11 Magyar Kupa season. On 10 November 2010, Kecskemét beat Debrecen 3-0 at the Oláh Gábor utcai Stadion in the first leg of the round of 16 of the 2010–11 Magyar Kupa season. On 1 March 2011, Kecskemét beat Debrecen 3–1 at home. On 9 March 2011, Kecskemét beat Siófok 5–1 in the first leg of the quarter finals of the 2010–11 Magyar Kupa. The second leg ended with a 1–1 draw against Siófok on 15 March 2011. On 19 April 2011, Kecskemét beat Zalaegerszeg 5–1 at the Széktói Stadion in first leg of the semi-final of the Magyar Kupa. On 3 May 2011, Zalaegerszeg drew with Kecskemét at the ZTE Aréna. Kecskemét qualified for the final on 5–1 aggregate. The centenary year of 2011 saw an unprecedented success in the 100-year history of the club. KTE reached new heights by winning the 2011 Magyar Kupa on 17 May 2011, beating Videoton 3–2 in the final held in the Puskás Ferenc Stadium in Budapest. The victory meant that the club was able to play their first international matches, namely qualification games of the Europa League. The first international match was played at home in front of 3,400 spectators at the Széktói Stadion in Kecskemét against the Kazakh Aktobe, resulting in 1–1. The second game ended as a 0–0 draw, meaning that KTE fell out of the competition due to the away goals rule.

After the 2014–15 Nemzeti Bajnokság I season, the Hungarian Football Federation relegated Kecskemét to the Bács-Kiskun county first division due to financial reasons. In the 2017–18 season, Kecskemét got promoted to the third division, NB III.

=== 2020s ===
KTE spent four seasons in the third tier, and was promoted to Nemzeti Bajnokság II, the second-level championship in 2021.

Surprisingly, Kecskemét finished in second place, earning another promotion right away, and reaching the top tier again after a seven-year hiatus. Despite being the ultimate underdogs, with the smallest budget in the league, KTE earned a podium finish in the 2022–23 Nemzeti Bajnokság I. In the more than 120-year long history of Hungarian football championships, this was only the fifth time that a club reached the podium in the first tier immediately after being promoted.

The 2023–24 Nemzeti Bajnokság I did not start well for the club. However, they beat Ferencvárosi TC 2–1 at home on 5 November 2023.

On 7 January 2024, the club sold one of their key players, Gábor Szalai, to Swiss Super League club FC Lausanne-Sport.

The 2024–25 Nemzeti Bajnokság I season did not start well for the club. On 28 July 2024, Kecskemét drew with Fehérvár at home, and lost 1-0 to Ferencváros at the Groupama Aréna. On 9 August 2024, Kecskemét drew with Debrecen at home (1-1). The first victory of the season was against newly promoted Gyór (2–1) on 16 August 2024. After the victory, Kecskemét suffered five consecutive defeats against Diósgyőr (0–1) at the Diósgyőri Stadion, Újpest (1–3), Zalaegerszeg (1–2) at the ZTE Arena, Nyíregyháza (0–2), and MTK Budapest (1–3) at the Hidegkuti Nándor Stadion. On 15 October 2024, István Szabó was sacked due to the performance of the club. On 16 October 2024, Zoltán Gera was appointed as the new manager of the club. Gera's debut ended with a 3-0 defeat against Puskás Akadémia FC at home on 20 October 2024.

On 10 May 2025, Kecskemét lost to MTK Budapest FC 2-1 at the Hidegkuti Nándor Stadion. Thos defeat meant that Kecskemét were relegated to the second division. After the match, Zoltán Gera said that there were players who underperformed and there are reasons why Kecskemét were relegated.

In the 2025–26 Nemzeti Bajnokság II season, Kecskemét hosted Vasas in the first round and lost to 2-1. On 10 August 2025, Kecskemét could beat Budapesti VSC at Szőnyi úti Stadion by 1-0. On 18 August 2025, Kecskemét beat Videoton Fehérvár 3-1 at home. On 24 August 2025, Kecskemét lost 2-0 to Budafoki MTE at Promontor utcai Stadion. Two days later, on 26 August 2025, Zoltán Gera was sacked and was replaced by Krisztián Tímár.

== Current squad ==
As of 20 August 2026

Note: Flags indicate national team as defined under FIFA eligibility rules; some limited exceptions apply. Players may hold more than one non-FIFA nationality.

No.	Pos.	Nation	Player
1	GK	HUN	Kristóf Pálfi
3	DF	HUN	Szilárd Szűcs
4	DF	HUN	Zoltán Szilágyi
6	MF	HUN	Attila Haris
7	MF	HUN	Ádám Merényi
8	MF	HUN	Patrik Nyári
10	MF	HUN	Bálint Szabó
11	MF	HUN	Barnabás Kovács
12	GK	HUN	Barnabás Ruisz
14	FW	HUN	Péter Beke
15	DF	HUN	Gergő Gajág
17	FW	HUN	Marcell Berki
19	DF	SVK	János Szépe

No.	Pos.	Nation	Player
23	FW	HUN	Péter Bányai
26	FW	HUN	Balázs Farkas
27	DF	HUN	Botond Bolgár (on loan from Ferencvárosi)
28	DF	HUN	András Horváth
29	FW	HUN	Andor Bolyki
31	FW	HUN	Gergő Pljesovszki
34	DF	HUN	András Szojma
44	MF	HUN	Sándor Göblyös
66	MF	HUN	András Eördögh
74	DF	HUN	Patrik Pálvölgyi
77	DF	HUN	Máté Kotula
92	FW	HUN	Barnabás Németh
97	GK	HUN	István Szabados

=== Out on loan ===
Note: Flags indicate national team as defined under FIFA eligibility rules; some limited exceptions apply. Players may hold more than one non-FIFA nationality.

No. / Pos. / Nation / Player	No. / Pos. / Nation / Player

== Stadium ==
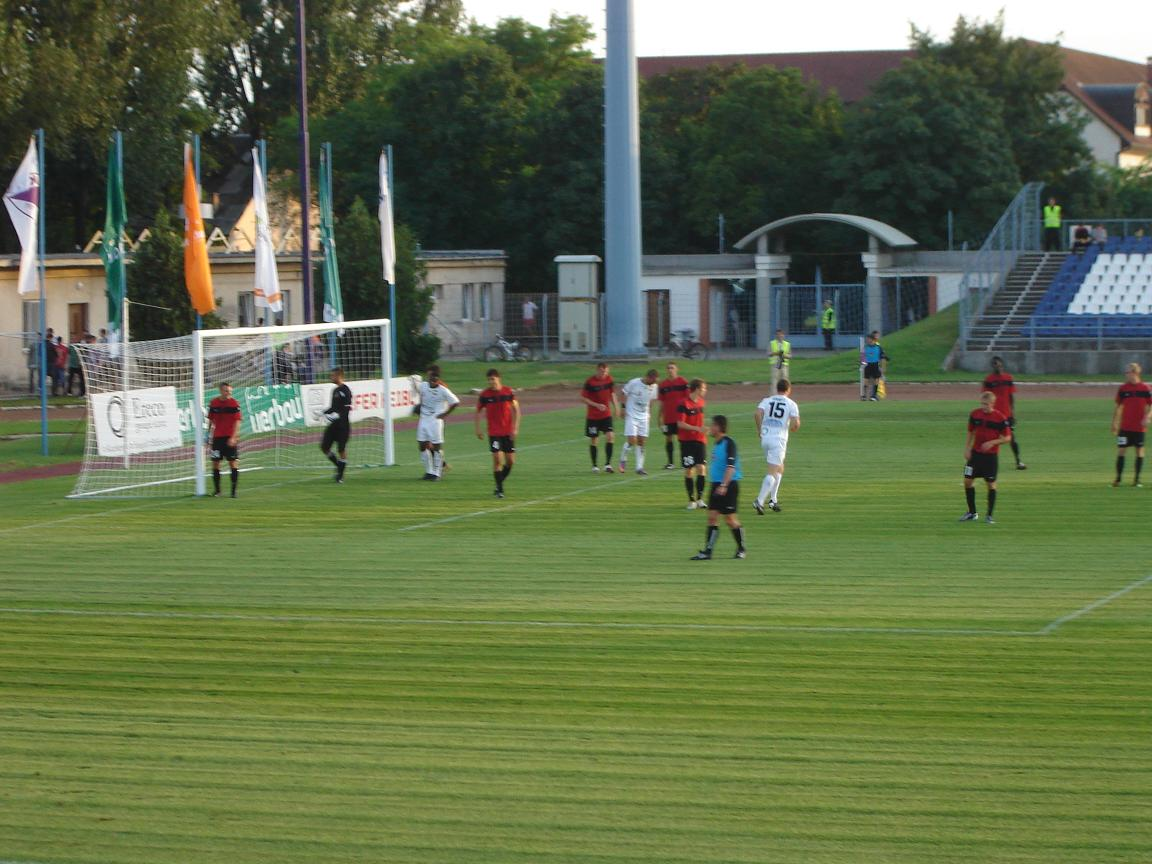
Kecskemét-Budapest Honvéd Hungarian League match

Kecskeméti TE plays its home games at Széktói Stadion, built in 1962. With 4,300 seats, and standing room for 2,000 in the standing-only sections, it is the largest football stadium in Kecskemét. In 2002, it was completely renovated. The lighting installation consists of 128 floodlights mounted on four masts 38m in height, and the average vertical illuminance is 1200 lx.

== Honours ==
- Nemzeti Bajnokság I
  - Runners-up (1): 2022–23
- Magyar Kupa
  - Winners (1): 2010–11
- Ligakupa
  - Runners-up (1): 2011–12
- Nemzeti Bajnokság II
  - Winners (2): 1945, 2007–08
  - Runners-up (2): 2000–01, 2021–22
- Nemzeti Bajnokság III
  - Winners (4): 1957–58, 1986–87, 1989–90, 1994–95
  - Runners-up (3): 1958–59, 1991–92, 2020–21
- Megyei Bajnokság I
  - Winners (1): 2017–18

== Seasons ==
=== League positions ===
As of 18 July 2025

- Between 1970–71 and 1972–73 the fourth tier league called NB III.
- In 1973–74 the third tier league called NB II.
- Between 1981–82 and 1986–87 the third tier league called Regional League.
- Between 1997–98 and 2004–05 the second tier league called NB I/B.

== In European Competition ==
Season	Competition	Round	Country	Club	Home	Away	Aggregate
2011–12	UEFA Europa League	2Q	(Kazakhstan)	Aktobe	1–1	0–0	1–1 (a)
2023–24	UEFA Europa Conference League	2Q	(Latvia)	Riga	2–1	1–3 (a.e.t.)	3–4

== See also ==
- List of Kecskeméti TE managers
- List of Kecskeméti TE seasons
