= Egyetemi Bajnokság =

- Current season or competition: 2009–10 Egyetemi Bajnokság season
- Sport: Rugby union
- Number of teams: 6
- Country: Hungary

The Egyetemi Bajnokság (University Championships) is a rugby competition played in Hungary.

== Format and structure ==
Six teams take part in six circuit tournaments.

== Current teams ==
2009–10 season

Location of teams in the Egyetemi Bajnokság I 2009-10

Club	Full name	City	Stadium
Általános Vállalkozási Fõiskola	Általános Vállalkozási Fõiskola Vak Mókusok Rögbi Klub	Budapest	N/A
Budapesti Gazdasági Főiskola		Budapest	N/A
Dunaújvárosi Fõiskola	Dunaújvárosi Szomjas Tevék Fõiskolai Rögbi Csapat	Dunaújváros	N/A
Szent István Egyetem		Gödöllő	N/A
Pécsi Tudományegyetem		Pécs	N/A
SZTE EHÖK	Szegedi Tudományegyetem Egyetemi Hallgatói Önkormányzat Sport Egyesület	Szeged	Etelka sori stadion

== See also ==
- Rugby union in Hungary
