= Radočaj Brodski =

Coordinates: 45°26′16″N 14°51′57″E

- Village
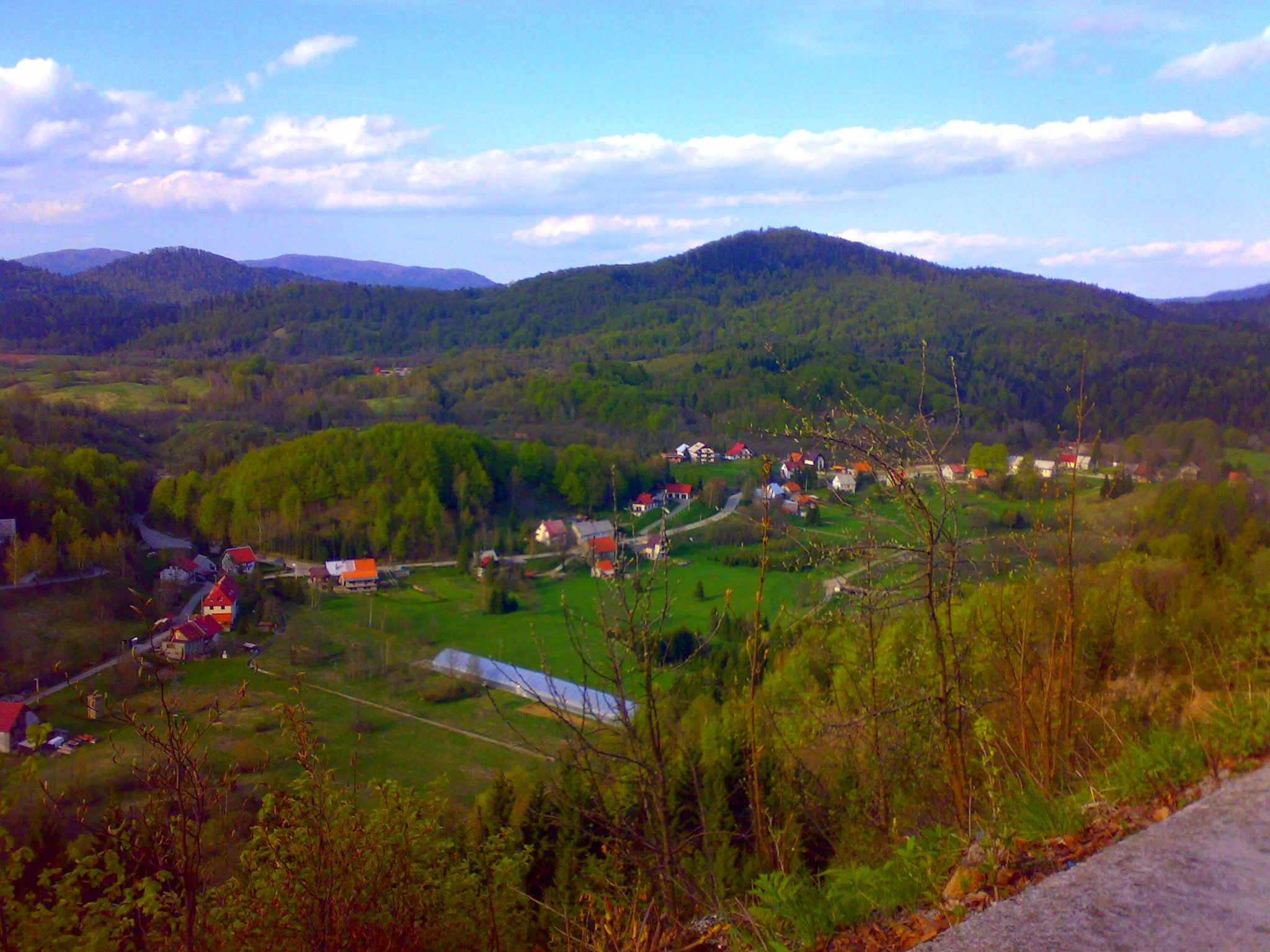
- Interactive map of Radočaj Brodski
- Location within Croatia
- Country: Croatia
- County: Primorje-Gorski Kotar County
- Town: Delnice

Area
  - Total: 1.7 km^{2} (0.66 sq mi)

Population (2021)
  - Total: 5
  - Density: 2.9/km^{2} (7.6/sq mi)
- Time zone: UTC+1 (CET)
  - Summer (DST): UTC+2 (CEST)

Radočaj Brodski is a village in Croatia.

== History ==
In October 2024, three people stole 11 metres (36 ft) of beech from state forests near Radočaj Brodski, but were caught that December.

On 7 November 2024, the villagers of Donji Ložac, Radočaj Brodski, Gusti Laz, Grbajel, Golik, Belo, Čedanj and Kupa were informed that their tap water was not bacteriologically safe to drink.
