= Kuppa =

Kuppa may refer to:

- Kuppa, Republic of Dagestan, a rural locality in Dagestan, Russia
- Kotli Kuppa a rural locality in Sialkot District, Pakistan
- Kuppa, the main character of Captain Kuppa
- Bowser, the Mario character known in Japan as "Kuppa" or "Koopa"
- A Japanese transliteration of Gukbap, a Korean soup and rice dish
- Padma Kuppa, American politician
