= Donji Ložac =

- Village
- Interactive map of Donji Ložac
- Coordinates: 45°26′46″N 14°52′35″E
- Country: Croatia
- County: Primorje-Gorski Kotar County
- Town: Delnice

Area
  - Total: 2.3 km^{2} (0.89 sq mi)

Population (2021)
  - Total: 5
  - Density: 2.2/km^{2} (5.6/sq mi)
- Time zone: UTC+1 (CET)
  - Summer (DST): UTC+2 (CEST)

Donji Ložac is a village in Primorje-Gorski Kotar County in Croatia, on the territory of the city of Delnice.

== History ==
On 7 November 2024, the villagers of Donji Ložac, Radočaj Brodski, Gusti Laz, Grbajel, Golik, Belo, Čedanj and Kupa were informed that their tap water was not bacteriologically safe to drink.

== Demographics ==
Village of Donji Ložac: Population trends 1857–2021
v

population	38	42	33	29	32	33	30	42	39	39	23	14	20	13	8	6	5
	1857	1869	1880	1890	1900	1910	1921	1931	1948	1953	1961	1971	1981	1991	2001	2011	2021

Sources: Croatian Bureau of Statistics publications
