= Čedanj =

- Village
- Interactive map of Čedanj
- Coordinates: 45°28′32″N 14°54′22″E
- Country: Croatia
- County: Primorje-Gorski Kotar County
- Town: Delnice

Area
  - Total: 0.7 km^{2} (0.27 sq mi)

Population (2021)
  - Total: 3
  - Density: 4.3/km^{2} (11/sq mi)
- Time zone: UTC+1 (CET)
  - Summer (DST): UTC+2 (CEST)

Čedanj is a village in Primorje-Gorski Kotar County in Croatia, on the territory of the city of Delnice.

== History ==
On 7 November 2024, the villagers of Donji Ložac, Radočaj Brodski, Gusti Laz, Grbajel, Golik, Belo, Čedanj and Kupa were informed that their tap water was not bacteriologically safe to drink.

== Demographics ==
Village of Čedanj: Population trends 1857–2021
v

population	18				44	42	47		44	56	37	36	20	12	11	9	3
	1857	1869	1880	1890	1900	1910	1921	1931	1948	1953	1961	1971	1981	1991	2001	2011	2021

Note:From 1869 to 1890 and in 1931 its population was included in Kupa. Sources: Croatian Bureau of Statistics publications

== Čedanj ==
Beginning in 2013, the 7 stage 260 kilometres (160 mi) long Cycling Trail of Gorski Kotar (Croatian: Goranska biciklistička transverzala) passes through Čedanj.

== Bibliography ==
=== Biology ===
- Šašić, Martina; Nahirnić, Ana; Tarmann, Gerhard M. (2016-12-31). "Zygaenidae (Lepidoptera) in the Lepidoptera collections of the Croatian Natural History Museum". Natura Croatica: Periodicum Musei Historiae Naturalis Croatici. 25 (2): 233–248. doi:10.20302/NC.2016.25.19. eISSN 1848-7386.
