= Gusti Laz =

- Village
- Interactive map of Gusti Laz
- Coordinates: 45°27′36″N 14°49′59″E
- Country: Croatia
- County: Primorje-Gorski Kotar County
- Town: Delnice

Area
  - Total: 2.5 km^{2} (0.97 sq mi)

Population (2021)
  - Total: 6
  - Density: 2.4/km^{2} (6.2/sq mi)
- Time zone: UTC+1 (CET)
  - Summer (DST): UTC+2 (CEST)

Gusti Laz is a village in Primorje-Gorski Kotar County in Croatia, on the territory of the city of Delnice.

== History ==
On 7 November 2024, the villagers of Donji Ložac, Radočaj Brodski, Gusti Laz, Grbajel, Golik, Belo, Čedanj and Kupa were informed that their tap water was not bacteriologically safe to drink.

== Demographics ==
Village of Gusti Laz: Population trends 1857–2021
v

population	43	78	71	66	70	66	38	51	36	40	37	21	28	33	17	4	6
	1857	1869	1880	1890	1900	1910	1921	1931	1948	1953	1961	1971	1981	1991	2001	2011	2021

Sources: Croatian Bureau of Statistics publications

== Sports ==
Beginning in 2013, the 7 stage 260 kilometres (160 mi) long Cycling Trail of Gorski Kotar (Croatian: Goranska biciklistička transverzala) passes through Gusti Laz.
