= Gyulai Várvédők RK =

- Full name: Gyulai Várvédők Rögbi Klub
- Founded: 2010
- Location: Gyula, Hungary
- League(s): Hungarian National Championship II
Team kit

Gyulai Várvédők RK is a Hungarian rugby club in Gyula. They currently play in Hungarian National Championship II.

== History ==
The club was founded in 2010.
