= Golik, Croatia =

Golik
- Village
- Interactive map of Golik
- Coordinates: 45°27′57″N 14°52′36″E
- Country: Croatia
- County: Primorje-Gorski Kotar County
- Town: Delnice

Area
  - Total: 1.2 km^{2} (0.46 sq mi)

Population (2021)
  - Total: 7
  - Density: 5.8/km^{2} (15/sq mi)
- Time zone: UTC+1 (CET)
  - Summer (DST): UTC+2 (CEST)

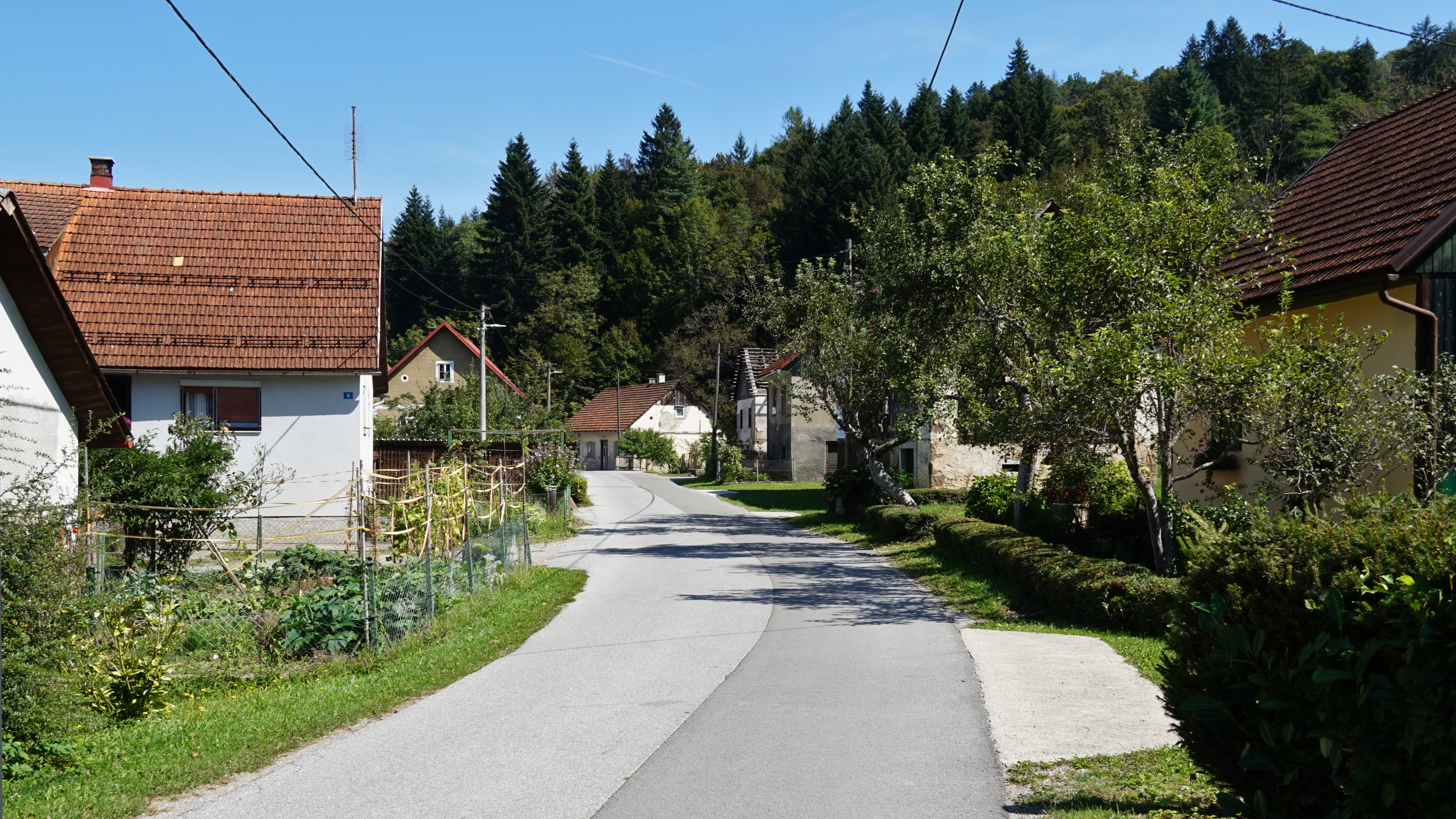
Golik village

Golik is a village in Primorje-Gorski Kotar County in Croatia, on the territory of the city of Delnice.

== History ==
It was recorded as Goliaki on the 1673 map of Stjepan Glavač.

On 7 November 2024, the villagers of Donji Ložac, Radočaj Brodski, Gusti Laz, Grbajel, Golik, Belo, Čedanj and Kupa were informed that their tap water was not bacteriologically safe to drink.

== Demographics ==
Village of Golik: Population trends 1857–2021
v

population	93	90	97	90	81	74	85	73	80	69	57	44	31	23	18	16	7
	1857	1869	1880	1890	1900	1910	1921	1931	1948	1953	1961	1971	1981	1991	2001	2011	2021

Sources: Croatian Bureau of Statistics publications

== Sports ==
Beginning in 2013, the 7 stage 260 kilometres (160 mi) long Cycling Trail of Gorski Kotar (Croatian: Goranska biciklistička transverzala) passes through Golik.

== Bibliography ==
- Melem Hajdarović, Mihela (2023-06-14). "Glavačeva karta Hrvatske iz 1673. – njezini toponimi, geografski sadržaj i historijskogeografski kontekst" [Glavač’s map of Croatia from 1673: Its toponyms, geographical content, and historical-geographical context]. Studia lexicographica. 17 (32): 47–78. doi:10.33604/sl.17.32.2. eISSN 2459-5578.
