= Belo, Croatia =

Belo
- Village
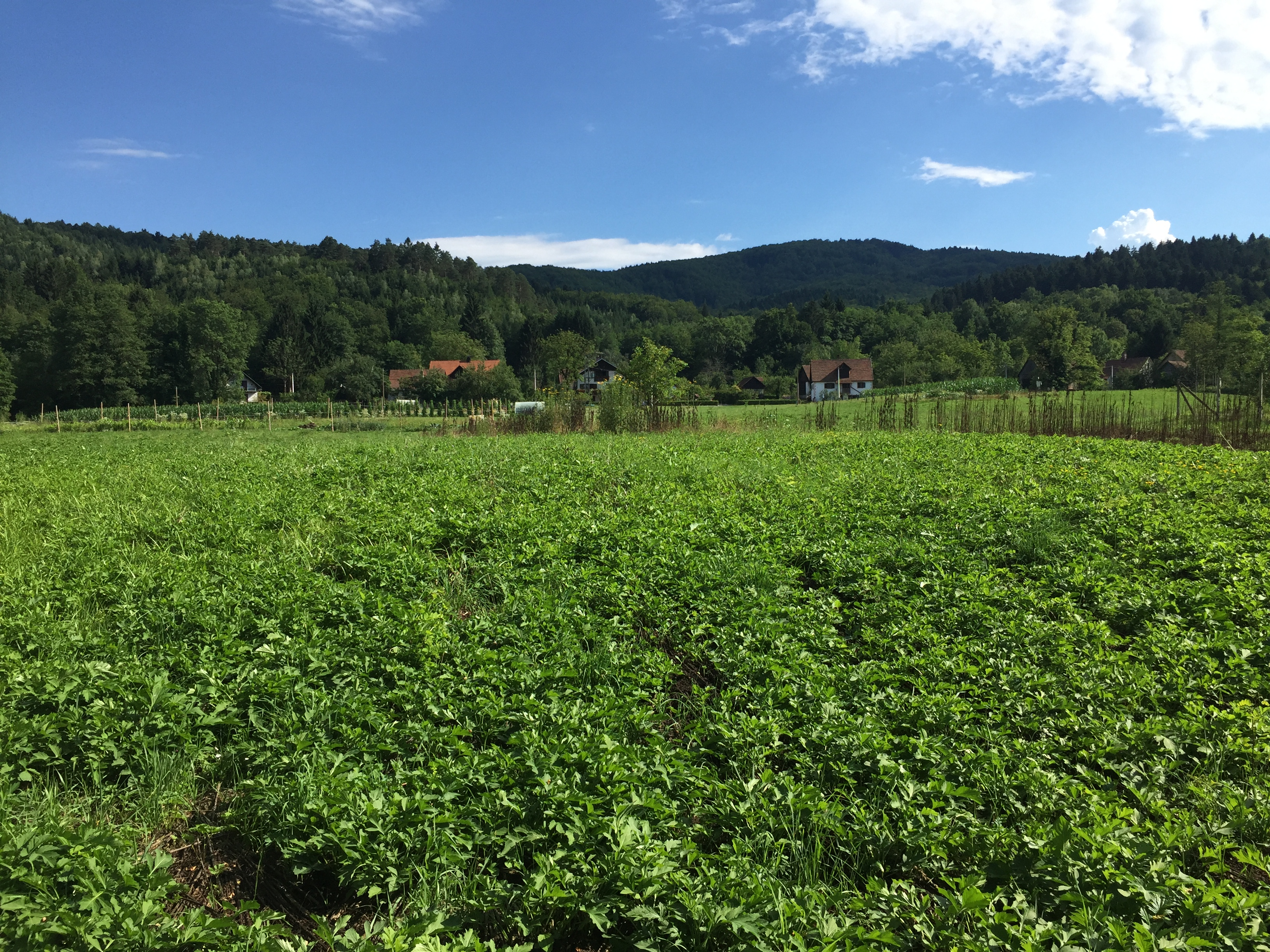
- Interactive map of Belo
- Coordinates: 45°28′26″N 14°53′40″E
- Country: Croatia
- County: Primorje-Gorski Kotar County
- Town: Delnice

Area
  - Total: 1.6 km^{2} (0.62 sq mi)
- Elevation: 215 m (705 ft)

Population (2021)
  - Total: 6
  - Density: 3.8/km^{2} (9.7/sq mi)
- Time zone: UTC+1 (CET)
  - Summer (DST): UTC+2 (CEST)

Belo is a village in Primorje-Gorski Kotar County in Croatia, on the territory of the city of Delnice.

== History ==
It was recorded as Beloszelo on the 1673 map of Stjepan Glavač.

A 22 December 1939 decision as part of agrarian reforms by Ban Šubašić to confiscate the local forest property of the Thurn and Taxis family, Kálmán Ghyczy and Nikola Petrović resulted in a legal dispute known as the Thurn and Taxis Affair, in part because of the relative status of the family and in part because of the proximity to the Italian border.

On 7 November 2024, the villagers of Donji Ložac, Radočaj Brodski, Gusti Laz, Grbajel, Golik, Belo, Čedanj and Kupa were informed that their tap water was not bacteriologically safe to drink.

== Demographics ==
Village of Belo: Population trends 1857–2021
v

population	82	86	81	74	67	77	76	66	43	33	30	24	14	23	13	9	6
	1857	1869	1880	1890	1900	1910	1921	1931	1948	1953	1961	1971	1981	1991	2001	2011	2021

Sources: Croatian Bureau of Statistics publications

== Sports ==
Beginning in 2013, the 7 stage 260 kilometres (160 mi) long Cycling Trail of Gorski Kotar (Croatian: Goranska biciklistička transverzala) passes through Belo.

== Gallery ==
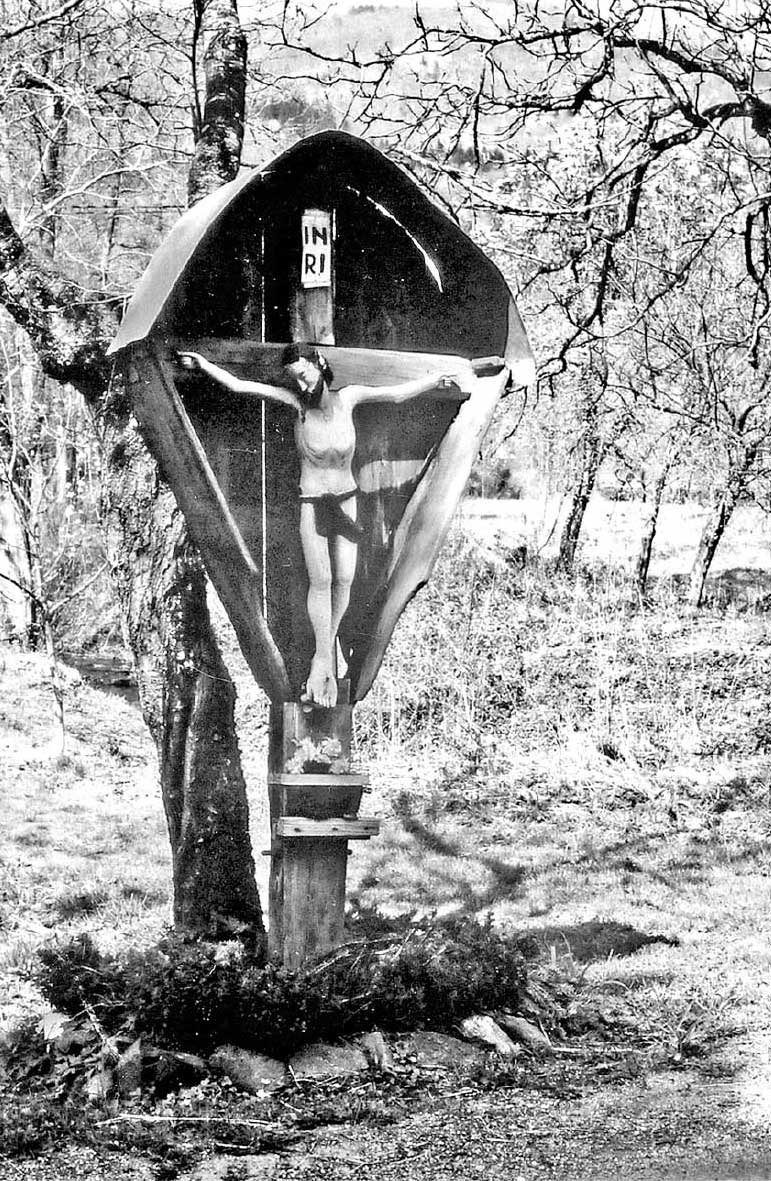
Crucifix bógac

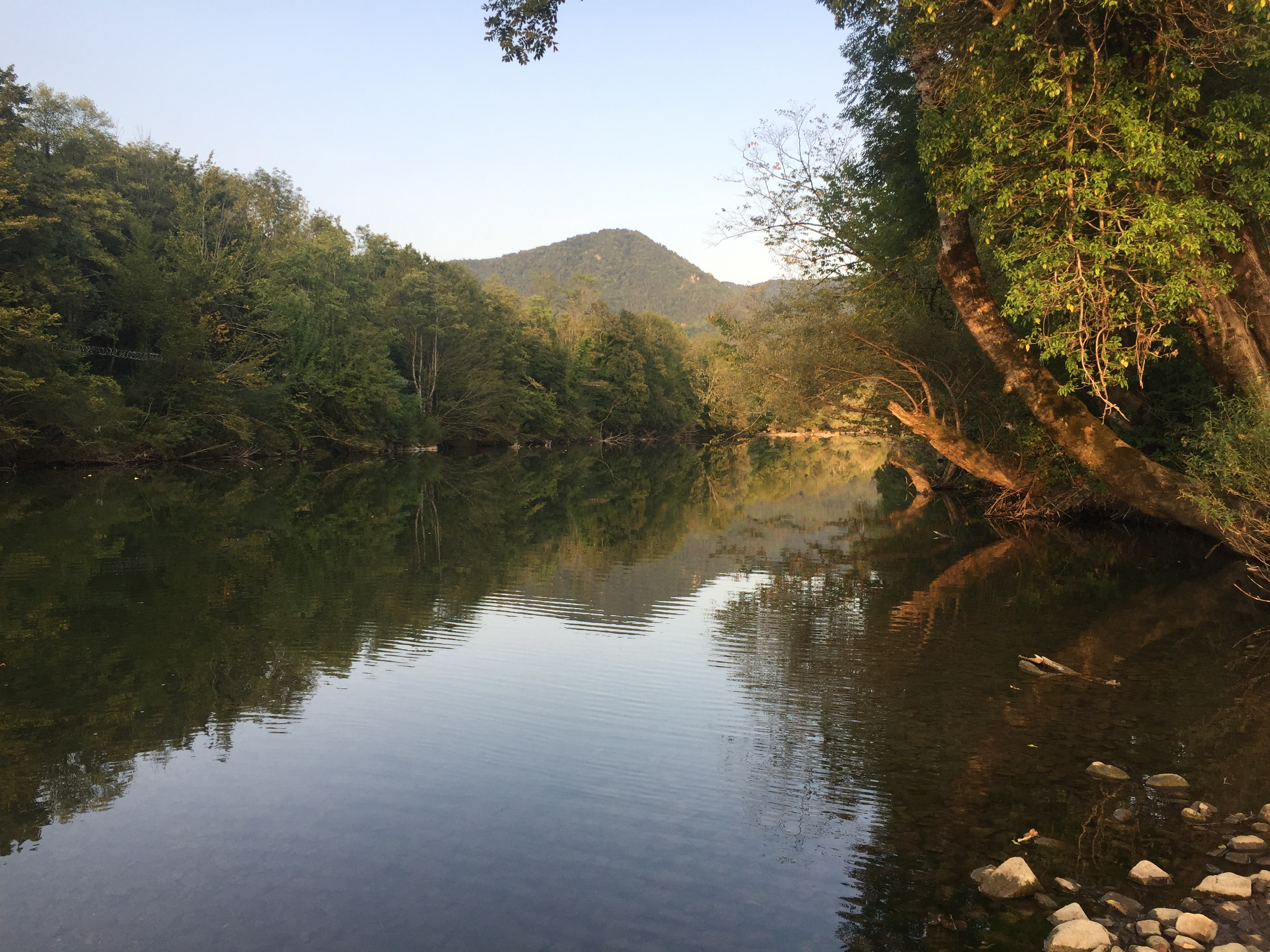
Kupa by Belo (downstream)

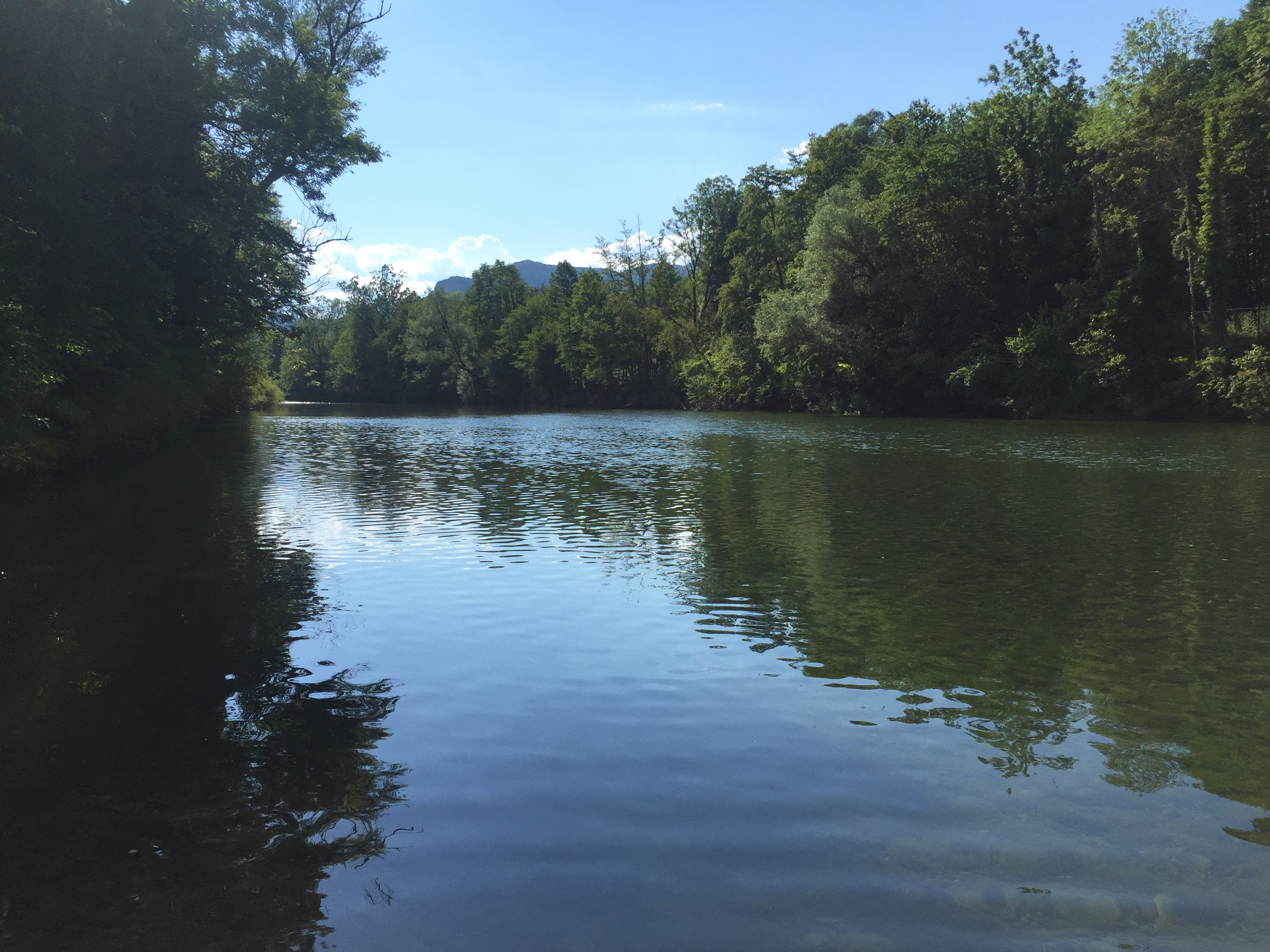
Kupa by Belo (upstream)

== Bibliography ==
- Melem Hajdarović, Mihela (2023-06-14). "Glavačeva karta Hrvatske iz 1673. – njezini toponimi, geografski sadržaj i historijskogeografski kontekst" [Glavač’s map of Croatia from 1673: Its toponyms, geographical content, and historical-geographical context]. Studia lexicographica. 17 (32): 47–78. doi:10.33604/sl.17.32.2. eISSN 2459-5578.
