= Grbajel =

- Village
- Interactive map of Grbajel
- Coordinates: 45°28′02″N 14°48′40″E
- Country: Croatia
- County: Primorje-Gorski Kotar County
- Town: Delnice

Area
  - Total: 5.5 km^{2} (2.1 sq mi)

Population (2021)
  - Total: 11
  - Density: 2.0/km^{2} (5.2/sq mi)
- Time zone: UTC+1 (CET)
  - Summer (DST): UTC+2 (CEST)

Grbajel is a village in Primorje-Gorski Kotar County in Croatia, on the territory of the city of Delnice.

== History ==
Beginning late 1899, HPS member Pavlić began building a road to the Hajdova hiža cave.

A 22 December 1939 decision as part of agrarian reforms by Ban Šubašić to confiscate the local forest property of the Thurn and Taxis family, Kálmán Ghyczy and Nikola Petrović resulted in a legal dispute known as the Thurn and Taxis Affair, in part because of the relative status of the family and in part because of the proximity to the Italian border.

On 7 November 2024, the villagers of Donji Ložac, Radočaj Brodski, Gusti Laz, Grbajel, Golik, Belo, Čedanj and Kupa were informed that their tap water was not bacteriologically safe to drink.

== Demographics ==
Village of Grbajel: Population trends 1857–2021
v

population	160	150	116	113	100	103	106	98	101	100	72	54	39	21	21	17	11
	1857	1869	1880	1890	1900	1910	1921	1931	1948	1953	1961	1971	1981	1991	2001	2011	2021

Note:"Gerbalj" in 1857. Sources: Croatian Bureau of Statistics publications

== Bibliography ==
=== History ===
- Prusac, Stjepan (2023-09-26) [defended 2023-09-25]. Posjedi obitelji Thurn Taxis nakon 1918. godine [Thurn Taxis Estates in Croatia after First World War] (Thesis) (in Croatian). Zagreb: Filozofski fakultet Sveučilišta u Zagrebu.
- Banska vlast Banovine Hrvatske (1940b). "Gospodarska prosvjeta i banovinska dobra". Godišnjak banske vlasti Banovine Hrvatske. Vol. 1. pp. 89–96.
