= Pécsi Indiánok SK =

Pécsi Indiánok
- Full name: Pécsi Indiánok Rögbi Klub
- Nickname: Indiánok (Indians)
- Founded: 1996
- Location: Pécs, Hungary
- Ground: Pécsi Vasutas Sportkör sporttelep
- President: (Hungary) József Durucskó
- Coach: (Hungary) József Durucskó
- League: Nemzeti Bajnokság I
Team kit

Pécsi Indiánok SK is a Hungarian rugby club in Pécs. They currently play in the Nemzeti Bajnokság II.

== History ==
The club was founded in 1996. The club was originally the reserve team of Termesz Rugby Club until autumn 1996, when they founded a new club under the name Pécsi Indiánok Rugby Club. First they played in the Hungarian Cadets Championship, which they have won in 1996. For the 1997-1998 season the club joined the Croatian-Slovenian Rugby Championship. For the 1998-1999 season they have returned to Hungary to play in Nemzeti Bajnokság II., which is the second tier of national rugby union competition in Hungary. They have won the competition in the 2003-2004 season. In 2004 the club's name was changed to Pécsi Indiánok Sport Klub. From 2004 they play in the Nemzeti Bajnokság I., which is now the second highest tier of the national rugby union competition in Hungary, after the Extraliga.

== Honours ==
- Nemzeti Bajnokság II
  - 2004
