= Zoltán Szilágyi =

Zoltán Szilágyi may refer to:

- Zoltán Szilágyi (swimmer)
- Zoltán Szilágyi (handball coach)

== See also ==
- Zoltán Szilágyi Varga, Hungarian graphic artist and animation director
