= Kupa, Croatia =

Village in Croatia

- Bridge of Good People, Kupa Village

- Location within Croatia
- Coordinates: 45.48°N 14.912°E

Area
  - Total: 0.7 km^{2} (0.27 sq mi)

Population (2021)
  - Total: 5
  - Density: 7.1/km^{2} (18/sq mi)

Kupa is a village located on the right bank of the eponymous river, near Delnice, Primorje-Gorski Kotar County, Croatia; population 8 (2011).

== History ==
On 7 November 2024, the villagers of Donji Ložac, Radočaj Brodski, Gusti Laz, Grbajel, Golik, Belo, Čedanj and Kupa were informed that their tap water was not bacteriologically safe to drink.
