= 2018–19 Magyar Kupa (men's volleyball) =

2016–17 férfi Magyar Kupa
- Sport: Volleyball
- Duration: 28 September 2018 – 15 January 2019

Finals
- Champions: [[]] (..th title)
- Runners-up: [[]]
- Finals MVP: [[]]

Magyar Kupa (men's volleyball) seasons
- ← 2017–18 2019–20 →

2018–19 Magyar Kupa is the 60th edition of the Magyar Kupa tournament.

== Matches ==
A total of ... matches will take place, starting with Pre-qualifying on 28 September 2018 and culminating with the Final on 17 March 2019.

=== Pre-qualifying ===
The pre-qualifying round ties was scheduled for 29 August – 2 September 2018.

Team 1	Score	Team 2
GLP Nyíregyháza (II)	1–3	SZESE Győr (I)

=== Round of 16 ===
Team 1	Agg.	Team 2	1st leg	2nd leg	Golden Set
MÁV Előre SC (I)	6–1	Sümegi RE (I)	3–1	3–0	
MEAFC-Miskolc (II)	0–3	Szolnoki RK (I)	0–3		
PTE-PEAC (I)	0–6	LV Sport Pénzügyőr SE (I)	0–3	0–3	
DEAC (I)	6–4	Dunaferr SE (I)	3–2	3–2	
TF SE	0–3	Fino Kaposvár SE (I)	0–3		
SZESE Győr (I)	0–6	VRC Kazincbarcika (I)	0–3	0–3	
Pénzügyőr SE Debrecen (II)	0–3	MAFC-BME (I)	0–3		
Szegedi RSE (II)	0–3	Kecskeméti RC (I)	0–3		

=== Quarterfinals ===
Team 1	Agg.	Team 2	1st leg	2nd leg	Golden Set
MAFC-BME (I)	0–6	VRC Kazincbarcika (I)	0–3	0–3	
MÁV Előre SC (I)	2–6	Fino Kaposvár SE (I)	1–3	1–3	
Szolnoki RK (I)	1–6	Kecskeméti RC	0–3	1–3	
DEAC (I)	–	LV Sport Pénzügyőr SE (I)	1–3	–	
