= Völgy Lovagjai Rögbi SE =

Völgy Lovagjai
- Full name: Völgy Lovagjai Rögbi Sport Egyesület
- Nickname(s): Lovagjai (Knights)
- Founded: 2010
- Location: Alcsútdoboz, Hungary
Team kit

Völgy Lovagjai Rögbi SE (Valley Knights) is a Hungarian rugby club in Alcsútdoboz. They do not currently play in a league.

== History ==
The club was founded in 2010.
