= Magyar Kupa (men's volleyball) =

Men's volleyball

Hungarian Men's Volleyball Cup Magyar férfi röplabdakupa
- Sport: Volleyball
- Founded: 1951
- Country: Hungary
- Continent: (European Union) Europe
- Most recent champion: Vegész (3rd title)
- Most titles: Kaposvár (18 titles)
- Website: hunvolley.hu

The Magyar Kupa (Hungarian: Magyar férfi röplabdakupa), is a national cup for professional men's volleyball in Hungary, organized by the Hungarian Volleyball Federation since the 1951 season. Between 1957-58 and 1961–62, the event was not held three consecutive seasons.

Most successful team of the Hungarian Men's Volleyball Cup are Kaposvár Volley with eighteen titles.

== Winners ==
In 1954, 1955 and 1957, the cup was held on a grand scale. In 1983 they played two series (in March and December). In 1967 and 1968 the finals were played only in the following year. Previous cup winners are:

- 1951: Csepel
- 1952: Újpest
- 1953: Csepel
- 1954: Not Played
- 1955: Újpest
- 1956: Vasas
- 1957: Újpest
- 1957/58: Bp. Spartacus
- 1958–61: Not Played
- 1961/62: Újpest
- 1962/63: Bp. Honvéd
- 1964: Újpest
- 1965: Bp. Honvéd
- 1966: Bp. Honvéd
- 1967: Bp. Honvéd
- 1968: Bp. Honvéd
- 1969: Csepel
- 1970: Csepel
- 1971: Csepel
- 1972: Csepel
- 1973: Újpest
- 1974: Csepel
- 1975: Újpest
- 1976: Csepel
- 1977: Bp. Spartacus
- 1978: Csepel
- 1979: Csepel
- 1980: Csepel
- 1981: Csepel
- 1981/82: Csepel
- 1982/83: Kecskemét
- 1983/84: Tungsram
- 1984/85: Tungsram
- 1985/86: Tungsram
- 1986/87: Tungsram
- 1987/88: Kecskemét
- 1988/89: Újpest
- 1989/90: Csepel
- 1990/91: Nyíregyháza
- 1991/92: Kaposvár
- 1992/93: Szeged
- 1993/94: Kaposvár
- 1994/95: Szeged
- 1995/96: Szeged
- 1996/97: Kaposvár
- 1997/98: Kaposvár
- 1998/99: Kaposvár
- 1999/00: Kaposvár
- 2000/01: Szeged
- 2001/02: Kaposvár
- 2002/03: Kaposvár
- 2003/04: Kazincbarcika
- 2004/05: Kazincbarcika
- 2005/06: Kaposvár
- 2006/07: Kaposvár
- 2007/08: Kaposvár
- 2008/09: Kaposvár
- 2009/10: Kaposvár
- 2010/11: Kaposvár
- 2011/12: Kaposvár
- 2012/13: Kaposvár
- 2013/14: Kecskemét
- 2014/15: Kaposvár
- 2015/16: Kaposvár
- 2016/17: Szolnok
- 2017/18: Kazincbarcika
- 2018/19:

== Performances ==
=== By club ===
The performance of various clubs is shown in the following table:

Club	Titles	Runners-up	Winning years
Kaposvár (Note: Includes Kaposvári Somogy SC, Kaposvári Balatel RC, Balatel SE Kaposvár, Pini Kaposvár SE, Kométa Kaposvár SE, Diamant Kaposvár SE and Fino Kaposvár SE.)	**18**	5	1991–92, 1993–94, 1996–97, 1997–98, 1998–99, 1999–00, 2001–02, 2002–03, 2005–06, 2006–07, 2007–08, 2008–09, 2009–10, 2010–11, 2011–12, 2012–13, 2014–15, 2015–16
Csepel (Note: Includes Csepeli Vasas, Csepel SC-Kordax and Csepel SC .)	**14**	3	1951, 1953, 1969, 1970, 1971, 1972, 1974, 1976, 1978, 1979, 1980, 1981, 1981–82, 1989–90
Újpest (Note: Includes Bp. Dózsa, Újpesti Dózsa and Újpesti TE.)	**8**	9	1952, 1955, 1957, 1961–62, 1964, 1973, 1975, 1988–89
Bp. Honvéd (Note: Includes Rába ETO, Győri Rába ETO and Győri Gardénia ETO KC.)	**5**	6	1962–63, 1965, 1966, 1967, 1968
Szeged (Note: Includes Szegedi Építők, Papiron SC Szeged and Medikémia-Szeged.)	**4**	6	1992–93, 1994–95, 1995–96, 2000–01
Tungsram (Note: Includes Tungsram SC and Tungsram SC-Újpest.)	**4**	1	1983–84, 1984–85, 1985–86, 1986–87
Kecskemét (Note: Includes Kecskeméti SC, Kalo MÉH-Kecskeméti RC, Kádár-Kecskeméti RC, Gorter-Kecskeméti RC and HÉP-Kecskeméti RC.)	**3**	13	1982–83, 1987–88, 2013–14
Kazincbarcika	**3**	4	2003–04, 2004–05, 2017–18
Bp. Spartacus	**2**	4	1957–58, 1977
Vasas (Note: Includes Vasas SC and Vasas SC-Tungsram.)	**1**	4	1956
Nyíregyháza (Note: Includes Nyíregyházi VSSC and Nyíregyházi VSC.)	**1**	2	1990–91
Szolnok (Note: Includes Szolnoki RKSI.)	**1**	0	2016–17
Dunaferr	–	2	-
Budapest SE (Note: Includes Bp. Petőfi.)	–	1	-
Miskolci VSC (Note: Includes Miskolci Törekvés.)	–	1	-
Miskolc	–	1	-
Pénzügyőr	–	1	-

=== By county ===
County	Titles	Winning clubs
Budapest	34	Csepel (14), Újpest (8), Honvéd (5), Tungsram (4), Spartacus (2), Vasas (1)
Somogy	18	**Kaposvár** (18)
Csongrád	4	Szeged (4)
Bács-Kiskun	3	**Kecskemét** (3)
Borsod-Abaúj-Zemplén	3	**Kazincbarcika** (3)
Szabolcs-Szatmár-Bereg	1	Nyíregyháza (1)
Jász-Nagykun-Szolnok	1	**Szolnok** (1)

- The bolded teams are currently playing in the 2018-19 season of the Hungarian League.
