= Balázs Bekő =

Hungarian football manager

Personal information
- Date of birth: 15 December 1971 (age 54)
- Place of birth: Budapest, Hungary
- Position: Midfielder

Team information
- Current team: Videoton (manager)

Senior career*
Years	Team	Apps	(Gls)
1990–1997	Videoton	153	(4)
1997	Ferencváros	5	(0)
1997–2000	Gázszer	68	(9)
2000	Vasas	10	(1)
2000–2001	Hapoel Jerusalem		
2001–2002	Videoton	30	(1)

Managerial career
- 2009–2011: Videoton (assistant)
- 2012–2013: Budaörsi
- 2013–2015: Kecskemét
- 2015: Diósgyőr
- 2016–2017: Győri ETO
- 2018: Soproni
- 2018: Balmazújvárosi
- 2023–2025: Dorog
- 2026–: Videoton
- * Club domestic league appearances and goals

Balázs Bekő (born 15 December 1971) is a Hungarian football manager and former player who is the head coach of Videoton.

== Managerial career ==
On 24 June 2013, Bekő became the head coach of the Nemzeti Bajnokság I club Kecskeméti TE.

Bekő became the head coach of the Nemzeti Bajnokság I club Diósgyőri VTK in the summer of 2015.

== Sources ==
- Diósgyőri VTK official website (in Hungarian)
