= Szentesi VSC 91-esek Rögbi Szakosztály =

Szentes
- Full name: Szentesi Vasutas Sport Club 91-esek Rögbi Szakosztály
- Founded: 1991
- Location: Szentes, Hungary
- Ground: MÁV pályá
- President: (Hungary) Attila Dobos (also player-coach)
- Captain: (Hungary) Szabolcs Kérdő
- League: Nemzeti Bajnokság I
Team kit

Szentesi VSC 91-esek Rögbi Szakosztály (Szentes Railways Sports Club 91 Rugby Department) is a Hungarian rugby club in Szentes. They currently play in Nemzeti Bajnokság I.

== History ==
The club was founded in 1991.

== Honours ==
- Nemzeti Bajnokság II
  - 1997, 2000, 2005, 2006, 2010
