= Cinkotai Royal Ground =

Recreational facility in Budapest, Hungary

- Interactive map of Cinkotai Royal Ground
- Location: Budapest, Hungary
- Coordinates: 47°30′59″N 19°13′25″E
- Surface: Grass

Construction
- Opened: 1994

Tenant
- Medvék RK

Cinkotai Royal Ground is a multi-purpose recreational facility in Budapest, Hungary. It is used for sports matches as well other events such as music concerts. The facility serves as the home ground of Budapest rugby club Medvék RK.

== History ==
The ground opened in 1994.
