= Kuppa, Republic of Dagestan =

Kuppa Куппа Къуппа
- Selo
- Location within Republic of Dagestan Location within Russia
- Coordinates: 42°25′N 47°07′E
- Country: Russia
- Region: Republic of Dagestan
- District: Levashinsky District
- Time zone: UTC+3:00

Kuppa (Russian: Куппа; Dargwa: Къуппа, romanized: Quppa) is a rural locality (a selo) and the administrative centre of Kuppinsky Selsoviet, Levashinsky District, Republic of Dagestan, Russia. The population was 1,462 as of 2010. There are 10 streets.

== Geography ==
Kuppa is located 22 km west of Levashi (the district's administrative centre) by road. Kundurkhe and Irgali are the nearest rural localities.

== Nationalities ==
Dargins live there.

== Famous residents ==
- Ziyautdin-Kadi (writer)
- I. Omarov (writer)
