= Hungarian Rugby Union =

Sports governing body in Hungary

Magyar Rögbi Szövetség
- Sport: Rugby union
- Founded: 1990; 36 years ago
- World Rugby affiliation: 1992
- Rugby Europe affiliation: 1991
- President: Antal Kiss
- Men's coach: Tamás Peleskei
- Women's coach: László Csont

The Hungarian Rugby Union (Hungarian: Magyar Rögbi Szövetség, pronounced [ˈmɒɟɒr ˈrøɡbi ˈsøvɛt͡ʃːeːɡ]) is the governing body for rugby union in Hungary. It was founded in 1990 and became affiliated to the International Rugby Board in 1992. It organises the three leagues, the Extraliga, the NB I and II, for what concerns rugby union. A few rugby 7s tournaments with also National 7s league and University Rugby 7s, and the various national teams. It is based in Esztergom.

== History ==
The union was founded in 1990 by László Hardy (president), Sándor Erdélyi (secretary-general) and Béla Körmöczi (board member) with nine clubs. It has since expanded to include 9 other clubs. In 2019, Hungarian rugby celebrated its 50th anniversary.

== Hungarian Rugby teams ==
=== Extraliga ===
- Battai Bátor Bulldogok
- Elefántok Rögbi SE
- Esztergomi Vitézek Suzuki
- Fit World Rugby Club
- Kecskeméti Atlétika és Rugby Club

=== NB I ===
- Benny Bulls Rugby Club
- Fehérvári Rögbi Klub
- Pécsi Indiánok
- Szentesi VSC 91-esek Rögbi Szakosztálya[1]
- Budapesti Exiles RE
- Medvék Rögbi Club
- DEAC Debrecen Rugby Football Club

=== NB II ===
- Dunaújvárosi Szomjas Tevék
- Gyöngyösi Farkasok
- Velencei Kék Cápák
- Általános Vállalkozási Főiskola Vak Mókusok
- Gödöllői Ördögök Rögbi Klub
- Restart-CVSE Kék Nefelejcs Rögbi Klub, Cegléd

=== Women teams ===
- Budapest Magpies
- Dunaújvárosi Szomjas Tevék
- Fehérvári Rögbi Klub

=== Barbarian team ===
- Kalandozó Magyarok (Hungarian adventurers)

=== Other teams ===
- Vörösmarty SC
- MTK Rögbiklub
- Árpádföldi Rögbiklub
- Újpesti Spartacus
- Botond SC
- OKGT
- Elte-Beac
- Liget SE
- Zöld Sólymok
- Maccabi
- Mecsek Lakóterületi SE
- Győri MGTSZ Rögbi Klub
- Pécsi Termeszek
- Érdi Ártatlanok
- Érdi Darazsak
- Érdi VSE Rögbiszakosztály
- MGM Diósd
- Békásmegyeri LSE Rugby
- Pákozdi Rögbi Klub
- SUB ROSA Rugby
- Miskolci Keselyűk
- Tárnok RC
- Köfém RC
- Fekete Hollók
- Szegedi Mogorva Gorillák
- Mogyoród RC
- Testnevelési Főiskola
- Rendőrtiszti Főiskola
- Leányfalui Old Boy
- Inter RC
- Győri Újkalász MTSZ
- Labor MIM
- III. ker. TTVE
- Szakipari Építők
- Keszthelyi Kék Villámok
- Gyáli Red Bulls Rögbi Klub
- Apostagi Rögbi Klub
- Szentlőrinci Rögbi Klub
- Kőszegi Rögbi Klub

== See also ==
- List of rugby clubs in Hungary
- Hungary national rugby union team
