= Medvék RK =

Medvék
- Full name: Medvék Rögbi Klub
- Nickname: Medvék (Bears)
- Founded: 2003
- Location: Budapest, Hungary
- Ground: Cinkotai Royal Ground
- President: (Hungary) Zoltán Baranyai
- Coach: (Hungary) Péter Jó-Dobronya
- Captain: (Hungary) Gábor Mahál
- League: Nemzeti Bajnokság II
Team kit

Medvék RK is a Hungarian rugby club in Budapest. They currently play in Nemzeti Bajnokság II.

== History ==
The club was founded in 2003.
