= Elefántok Rögbi SE =

Elefántok
- Full name: Elefántok Sport Egyesület
- Nickname: Elefántok (Elephants)
- Founded: 1993
- Location: Vác, Hungary
- Ground: Király Endre Ipari Szakközépiskola (Endre Király Industrial High School)
- Coach(es): (Hungary) Gyula Herpai, Balint Mezes (coach)
Team kit

Elefántok Rögbi SE is a Hungarian rugby club in Vác. They currently play in the Nemzeti Bajnokság I.

== History ==
The club was founded in 1993, although a possible forerunner team, Zöld Sólymok (Green Falcons), won the first ever Hungarian Cup earlier in the decade. Initially under the guidance of former Soviet international Vyacheslav Kozmenko, the club won the Nemzeti Bajnokság I three times within their first five years.

The club went through a bad patch in 1996, when financial and personnel problems arose. They were also suspended for two seasons by the Hungarian Rugby Union (MRgSz) following a discriminatory incident, but managed to bounce back by winning the Cup twice in succession in the two years following their suspension.

== Honours ==
- Nemzeti Bajnokság I
  - 1994, 1995, 1996 (all as Kispesti Elefántok)
- Hungarian Cup
  - 1998, 1999
