= Fehérvár RC =

Fehérvár
- Full name: Fehérvár Rugby Club
- Nickname(s): Vadkanok (Boars)
- Founded: 1985
- Location: Székesfehérvár, Hungary
- Ground(s): Köfém pálya
- President: (Hungary) Balázs Mátay
- Coach(es): (Hungary) Ferenc Gyolcsos (Hungary) Gábor Láng
Team kit

Fehérvár RC is a Hungarian rugby club in Székesfehérvár. They usually play in Nemzeti Bajnokság II, but have opted out of the 2010-11 season, possibly to rebuild the team.

== History ==
The club was founded in 1985 when Ferenc Gyolcsos, a former player of the now-defunct Liget SE club in Budapest, moved to the city of Székesfehérvár. On September 15 of that year fifteen players - Ernő Pleszinger, Tibor Kadlecsik, Sándor Czimmerman, Tamás Hegyi, Péter Barsch, Áron Garab, Ferenc Pálinkás, Tamás Faragó, György Mocsonoki, Zoltán Dávid, Csaba Horváth, Sándor Lázi, Sándor Keresztszegi, István Maróti and Sándor Elek - gathered for training at the Gázgyár pályáján (Gasworks field).

In 1990 the club was the first in Hungary to have junior sides, that provided the senior team with a steady supply of players. The junior team have been very successful, winning eight Junior Championships and 6 Junior Cup titles.
