= Ceglédi RC =

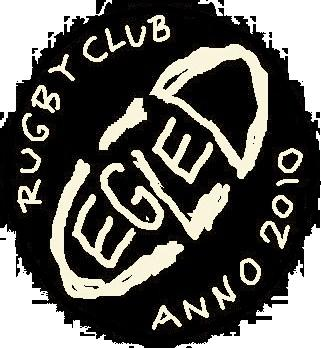
- Full name: Ceglédi Kék Nefelejcs Rugby Club
- Founded: 2010
- Location: Cegléd, Hungary
- Ground: Bedei pálya
- President: (Hungary) Miklós Pálinkás
- Coach: (Hungary) István Szabó (player-coach)
- League: Hungarian National Championship II
Team kit

Ceglédi RC is a Hungarian rugby club in Cegléd. Their full name is Restart-Ceglédi VSE Kék Nefelejcs Rögbi Fight Klub (és Népdalkör). They currently play in Hungarian National Championship II.

== History ==
The club was founded in 2010 by youngs from Cegléd and Ceglédbercel and the near villages. The first trainings were held at Ceglédbercel but in the end of the year they moved to Cegléd. They competed themselves in the Hungarian Sevens Championship in 2011 (there they won their first successful match against the second team of Szeged ) and started their first season in the Hungarian National Championship II in 2011/12. They have been integrated to the Ceglédi Vasutas Sport Egyesület, the oldest sport club of the city in the end of 2011. In 2012, they launched their female squad, who are playing rugby sevens.

== Notable players ==
The player-coach of the club, István Szabó was a member of the u20 Hungarian National Rugby Team.
