= Gyöngyösi Farkasok RK =

Gyöngyösi Farkasok
- Full name: Gyöngyösi Farkasok Rugby Klub
- Nickname: Farkasok (Wolves)
- Founded: 1991
- Location: Gyöngyös, Hungary
- Ground(s): Mátra Szakképzõ Iskola sportpályája, Mátrafüred
- President: (Hungary) Péter Gyuris (also player-coach)
- League: Nemzeti Bajnokság II
Team kit

Gyöngyösi Farkasok RK is a Hungarian rugby club based in Mátrafüred in Gyöngyös. They currently play in Nemzeti Bajnokság II.

== History ==
The club was founded in 1991.
