= SZTE EHÖK SE =

SZTE EHÖK
- Full name: Szegedi Tudományegyetem Egyetemi Hallgatói Önkormányzat Sport Egyesület
- Founded: 2009
- Location: Szeged, Hungary
- President: (Hungary) Gábor Ábrahám
- Coach: (Hungary) Zoltán Márton (player-coach)
- League: Nemzeti Bajnokság II
Team kit

SZTE EHÖK SE is a Hungarian rugby club in Szeged. The club is the official rugby team of the University of Szeged (Szegedi Tudományegyetem) and they currently play in Nemzeti Bajnokság II. They also take part in the Egyetemi Bajnokság (University Championships). In a way they can be seen as an unofficial second team for Fit World Gorillák RC, since some of that club's players also play for them occasionally.

== History ==
The club was founded in 2009.
