= László Török =

Hungarian historian (1941–2020)

- Born: 13 May 1941; Budapest, Kingdom of Hungary
- Died: 17 September 2020 (aged 79)
- Occupation: Historian

László Török (13 May 1941 – 17 September 2020) was a Hungarian historian, archaeologist, and Egyptologist. His works on the ancient Coptic language, Ancient Egypt, ancient Nubia, and the Kingdom of Kush were highly regarded. He was a member of the Hungarian Academy of Sciences.

== Biography ==
Török studied architecture at the Budapest University of Technology and Economics, graduating in 1964. In 1968, he earned a doctoral degree in architectural history. From 1971 to 1972, he studied coptology at Eötvös Loránd University in Budapest.

From 1981 to 1984, Török headed the department of Roman archaeology at the Archaeological Institute of the Hungarian Academy of Sciences. He also served as an honorary professor of Egyptology, starting in 1991. He became a full-fledged professor in 1992.

Török was best known for his publications on ancient Nubia. He became a foreign member of the Norwegian Academy of Science and Letters in 1995. He was given an honorary doctorate from the University of Bergen in 2000, and became a permanent member of the Hungarian Academy of Sciences in 2010.

The Hungarian Academy of Sciences awarded Török an academic tribute book for his archaeological discoveries and publications.

László Török died on 17 September 2020 at the age of 79.

== Awards ==
- Széchenyi Prize (2015)

== Publications ==
- A szegedi eklektika (1966)
- Meroé és Nubia a 2.-7. században (1977)
- Economic Offices and Officials in Meroitic Nubia (1979)
- Der meroitische Staat (1986)
- The Royal Crowns of Kush. A Study in Middle Nile Valley Regalia and Iconography in the 1st Millennia BC and AD (1987)
- Late Antique Nubia (1988)
- Coptic Antiquities I–II. (1993)
- Fontes Historiae Nubiorum. Textual Sources for the History of the Middle Nile Region between the eighth Century BC and the sixth Century AD (1994)
- Meroe. Six Studies on the Cultural Identity of An Ancient African State (1995)
- The Birth of an Ancient African Kingdom (1995)
- Egyptian Terracottas of the Hellenistic and Roman Periods (1995)
- The Kingdom of Kush. Handbook of the Napatan-Meroitic Civilization (1997)
- A vadászó kentaur (1998)
- The Image of the Ordered World in Ancient Nubian Art (2002)
- Transfigurations of Hellenism. Aspects of Late Antique Art in Egypt AD 250-700 (2005)
- Between Two Worlds. The Frontier Region between Ancient Nubia and Egypt 3700 BC - AD 500 (2009)
- Hellenizing Art in Ancient Nubia 300 BC - AD 250 and its Egyptian Models. A Study in "Acculturation" (2011)
- Herodotus in Nubia (2014)
