= Széktói Stadion =

Multi-use stadium in Kecskemét, Hungary

Coordinates: 46°54′5″N 19°40′8″E

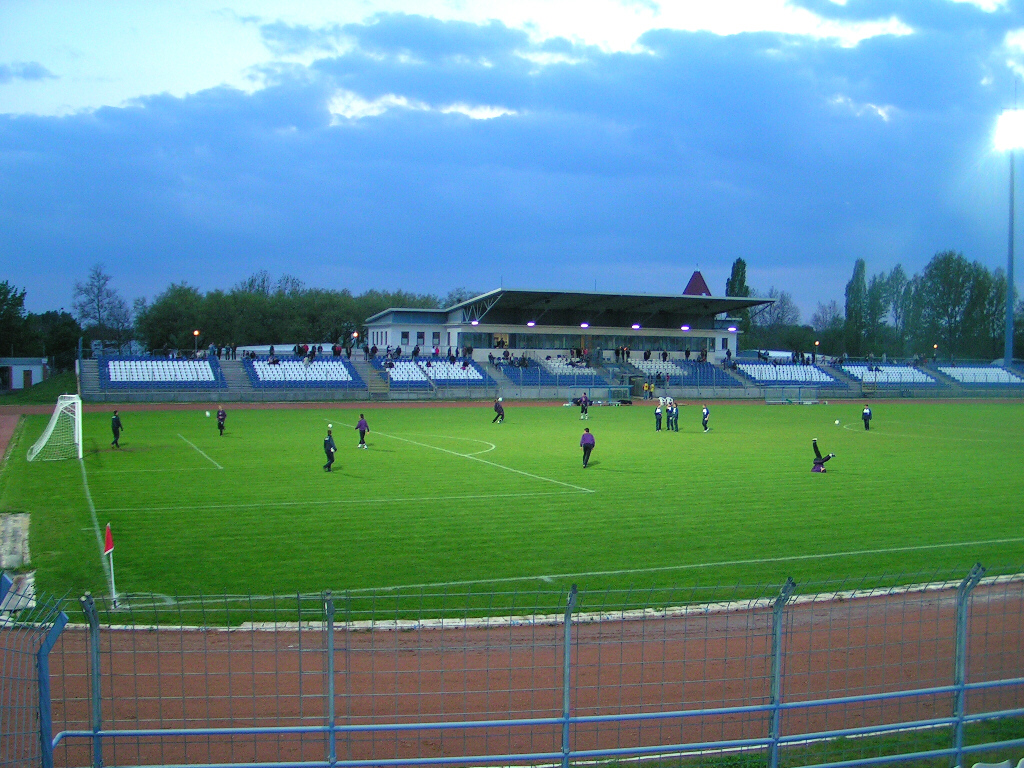
- Interactive map of Széktói Stadion
- Full name: Széktói Stadion
- Location: Kecskemét, Hungary
- Owner: City of Kecskemét
- Capacity: 6,300 (4,300 seats, 420 covered)
- Surface: grass
- Field size: 105 m × 65 m (344 ft × 213 ft)

Construction
- Built: 1962
- Opened: 1962. VIII. 20.
- Renovated: 2002

Tenants
- Kecskeméti TE, Kecskeméti Atlétika és Rugby Club

Széktói Stadion is a multi-use stadium in Kecskemét, Hungary. It is currently used mostly for football and rugby matches, and is the home stadium of Kecskeméti TE of the Hungarian National Championship I and of Kecskeméti Atlétika és Rugby Club of the Nemzeti Bajnokság I. With 4,300 seats, and standing room for 2,000, the stadium is able to hold 6,300 spectators.

== History ==
The stadium was built in 1962, with the help of several locals.

On 20 August 1962, it was opened with a match between Kecskeméti TE and Ganz-MÁVAG SE. The match ended with a 2-0 victory.

It was renovated in 2002. The new lighting installation was finished in 2008, after the club's promotion to the NB I, the top league of Hungarian football.

On 15 August 2012, Tunisia draw here with Iran 2–2 in friendly match. It was the first game between these two teams.
