= Gödöllői Ördögök RC =

Gödöllői Ördögök
- Full name: Gödöllői Ördögök Rögbi Csapat
- Nickname: Ördögök (Devils)
- Founded: 2006
- Location: Gödöllő, Hungary
- Coach: (Hungary) Márton Juhász (player-coach)
- League: Nemzeti Bajnokság II
Team kit

Gödöllői Ördögök RC is a Hungarian rugby club in Gödöllő. They currently play in Nemzeti Bajnokság II.

== History ==
The club was founded in 2006.
