= Fit World Gorillák RC =

Fit World Gorillák Szeged
- Full name: Fit World Gorillák Rugby Club
- Nickname: Gorillák (Gorillas)
- Founded: 1993 (as Mogorva Gorillák)
- Location: Szeged, Hungary
- Ground: Szeged Városi Stadion
- President: (Hungary) László Vörös
- Coach: (Hungary) Dénes Debreczeny (player-coach)
- League: Extraliga
Team kit

Fit World Gorillák RC is a Hungarian rugby club in Szeged. They currently play in the Hungarian Extraliga. The club is sponsored by a gymnasium in the city by the name of Fit World, hence the name.

== History ==
The club was re-established in 2004, but was founded in February 1993 by Jenő Palásti. The club won they first Hungarian championship in 2022.

== Historical names ==
- 1993 - Mogorva Gorillák
- 2004 - Fit World RC (Fit World Rugby Club)
- 2009 - Fit World Gorillák RC (Fit World Gorillák Rugby Club)

2011 Season
