= Békéscsabai Benny Bulls RC =

Hungarian rugby club

Békéscsabai Benny Bulls
- Full name: Békéscsabai Benny Bulls Rugby Club
- Nickname: Bulls
- Founded: 1992
- Location: Békéscsaba, Hungary
- Ground: Jamina pálya
- President: (Hungary) Csaba Lukács (also coach)
- League: Nemzeti Bajnokság I
Team kit

Békéscsabai Benny Bulls RC is a Hungarian rugby club in Békéscsaba. They currently play in Hungarian National Championship I.

== History ==
The club was founded in 1992.
