= Nemzeti Bajnokság I (rugby union) =

Hungarian second-tier sports league

Hungarian National Championship I
- Current season, competition or edition: 2024-25 Hungarian National Championship I (rugby union) season
- Sport: Rugby union
- Founded: 1989
- No. of teams: 8
- Country: Hungary
- Promotion to: Hungarian Extraliga
- Relegation to: Nemzeti Bajnokság II (rugby union)

The National Championship I (Hungarian: Nemzeti Bajnokság I, also DHL Nemzeti Bajnokság I for sponsorship reasons) is the second level of domestic club rugby union in Hungary after the Extraliga. There is promotion and relegation involved between National Championship I and the next level down, National Championship II (the second division).

== Format and structure ==
Eight teams take part and the competition is composed of a single league. Each team plays every other team.

Teams are awarded four points for a win, a bonus point for scoring four or more tries, and a bonus point for losing by seven points or less.

== Current teams ==
2011-12 season

Location of teams in the Nemzeti Bajnokság I 2010-11

Club	Full name	City	Stadium
Battai Bulldogok II (Fekete sereg - Black Army)	Battai Bulldogok Rögbi Klub	Százhalombatta	Százhalombattai Városi Szabadidőközpont
Békéscsabai Benny Bulls	Békéscsabai Benny Bulls Rugby Club	Békéscsaba	Jamina pályá
Elefántok Rögbi SE	Elefántok Rögbi Sport Egyesület	Vác	Király Endre Ipari Szakközépiskola
Esztergomi Vitézek II (Esztergomi Apródok - Esztergom Pages)	Esztergomi Vitézek Rugby Sportegyesület	Esztergom	Eszetergomi Rögbi Pálya
Kecskeméti Atlétika és Rugby Club II	Kecskeméti Atlétika és Rugby Club	Kecskemét	Széktói Stadion (4th Field)
Pécsi Indiánok SK	Pécsi Indiánok Sport Klub	Pécs	Pécsi Vasutas Sportkör sporttelep
Szentesi VSC 91-esek Rögbi Szakosztály	Szentesi Vasutas Sport Club 91-esek Rögbi Szakosztály	Szentes	MÁV pályá
Velencei Kék Cápák	Velencei Kék Cápák Rögbi Klub	Velence	Köfém pálya, Székesfehérvár

== Champions ==
- 1990
- 1991
- 1992
- 1993 Zöld Sólymok
- 1994 Elefántok
- 1995 Elefántok
- 1996 Elefántok
- 1997 Battai Bulldogok
- 1998 Kecskeméti Atlétika és Rugby Club
- 1999 Esztergomi Vitézek
- 2000 Esztergomi Vitézek
- 2001 Esztergomi Vitézek
- 2002 Esztergomi Vitézek
- 2003 Esztergomi Vitézek
- 2004 Esztergomi Vitézek
- 2005 Esztergomi Vitézek
- 2006 Esztergomi Vitézek
- 2007 Esztergomi Vitézek
- 2008 Esztergomi Vitézek
- 2009 Battai Bulldogok
- 2010 Battai Bulldogok

== See also ==
- Rugby union in Hungary
