= Battai Bulldogok RK =

Battai Bulldogok
- Full name: Battai Bulldogok Rögbi Klub
- Nickname: Bulldogok (Bulldogs)
- Founded: 1989
- Location: Százhalombatta, Hungary
- Ground: Százhalombatta Leisure Centre Rugby Field
- President: (Hungary) Sándor Tóth
- Coach: (Ukraine) Vyacheslav Kuzmenko
- League: Extraliga
Team kit

Battai Bulldogok RK (also known as gas.hu Battai Bulldogok for sponsorship reasons) is a Hungarian rugby club in Százhalombatta. Their first team currently play in the Extraliga, while their second team, Fekete Sereg (Black Army), play in Nemzeti Bajnokság I.

== History ==
The club was founded in January 1989 by Csaba Mátyás and among the founders were a number of former judo and canoeing internationals. They played their first match on 15 March 1989 when they took on the now-defunct Érdi Darazsak (Wasps of Érd). In their first full season they won promotion to Nemzeti Bajnokság I, only to be relegated back to Nemzeti Bajnokság II.

== Honours ==
- Nemzeti Bajnokság I
  - 1997, 2009, 2010
- Nemzeti Bajnokság II
  - 1990, 1992
- Hungarian Cup
  - 1997
