= Kecskeméti Atlétika és Rugby Club =

- Full name: Kecskeméti Atlétika és Rugby Club
- Founded: 1979
- Location: Kecskemét, Hungary
- Ground: Széktói Stadion (4th Field)
- President: (Hungary) Pál Túri
- Coach: (Romania) Gheorghe "Gica" Vacaru
- League: Extraliga
Team kit

Kecskeméti Atlétika és Rugby Club is a Hungarian rugby club in Kecskemét. They currently play in the Extraliga.

== History ==
The club was founded in the spring of 1979 by a couple of students and teachers at the Kecskeméti Gépipari és Automatizálási Műszaki Főiskola (Kecskemét College of Engineering and Automation Technology). This makes KARC the oldest rugby club still playing in the league.

The club has been in its present form since 1996, when the Kecskeméti Sport Club merged with the rugby club. It won the national championship in 1998.

== Historical names ==
- 1979 - Kecskeméti GAMF (Kecskeméti Gépipari és Automatizálási Műszaki Főiskola)
- 1995 – Kecskeméti RC (Kecskeméti Rugby Club)
- 1996 – Kecskeméti ARC (Kecskeméti Atlétika és Rugby Club)

== Honours ==
- Nemzeti Bajnokság I
  - 1998
