= Mátrafüred =

Coordinates: 47°49′48″N 19°58′48″E

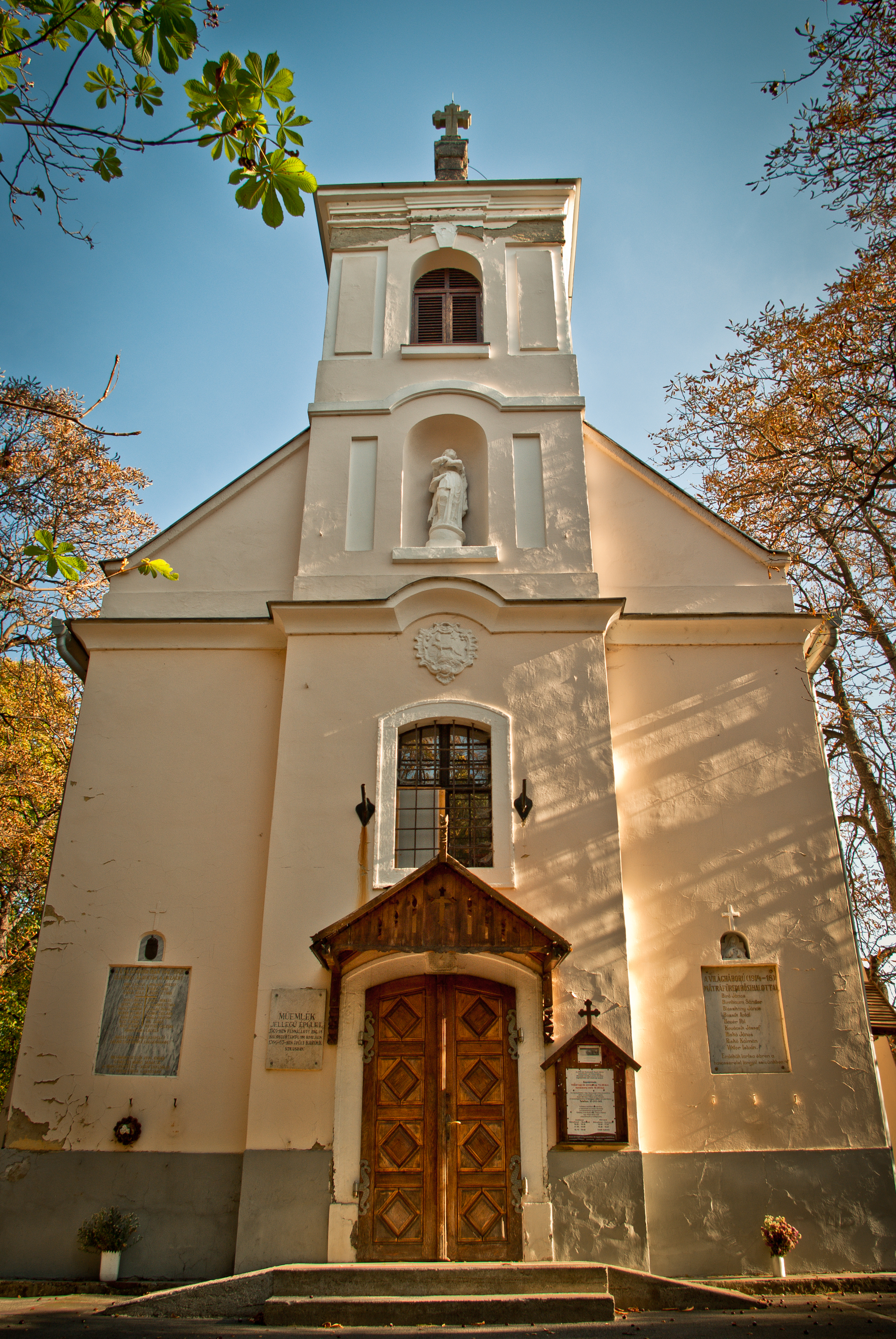
St. John chapel

Mátrafüred is an other inner area of the town of Gyöngyös in Heves county, Hungary, in the Mátra mountain range. The territory of Mátrafüred have an own postal code: 3232. It is 6.3 km away from the town center. As of 2022 census, it has a population of 844. Mátrafüred is the terminus of the Gyöngyös State Forest Railway's narrow-gauge railway line, what connect it with the town.

== History ==
Bronze Age artifacts were found on the western edge of the settlement. The Bene castle is first mentioned in the documents in 1301, what was built by the Csobánka family on the northeastern mountain ridge. They lost their property due to a rebellion against King Charles I in 1312. It was destroyed by the soldiers of Jan Jiskra in the middle of the 15th century. The remains of the wall were excavated in 1980. The settlement is referred to as Bene, Beneháza, Benepuszta and Beneváralja. A baroque-style chapel was built in 1767 out of gratitude that the plague had avoided the settlement. A stone cross was erected in 1833 in front of the chapel. The inn where poet Mihály Vörösmarty, the first known tourist of Mátra, stayed in 1829 was built near the chapel. Today, the Palóc ethnographic museum operates in the building. The population was engaged in drapery production, for which mills were built on the banks of the Bene creek. At the end of the 19th century, the mills were not mechanized, but dismantled. The settlement became the center of the Mátra Association and the construction of watchtowers and hostels began. Mátrafüred got its current name from its cold water spa in 1893. János Kozmáry built the first watchtower on Dobogó Hill in 1900. The road leading to Gyöngyös was built in 1908, and the narrow-gauge railway for tourist purposes in 1926. The first hotel was built in 1930. Between 1949 and 1989 the hotels were union resorts. The bed of the marshy Sás lake was dredged in 1960 and the water supply was provided from the nearby spring. The campsite next to the lake was opened in 1961 and the 50-meter steel watchtower was built. The lake open for boating. The cold water spa closed in the 1970s. The Avar hotel was built in 1976. A bicycle path was built to Gyöngyös in 1999 parallel to the road. A visitor center was built next to Sás lake in 2014, and an adventure park was opened near the lake.

== Gallery ==
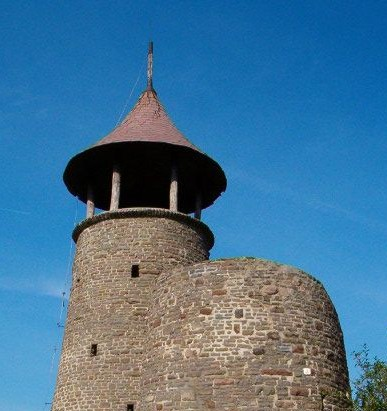
Kozmáry watchtower

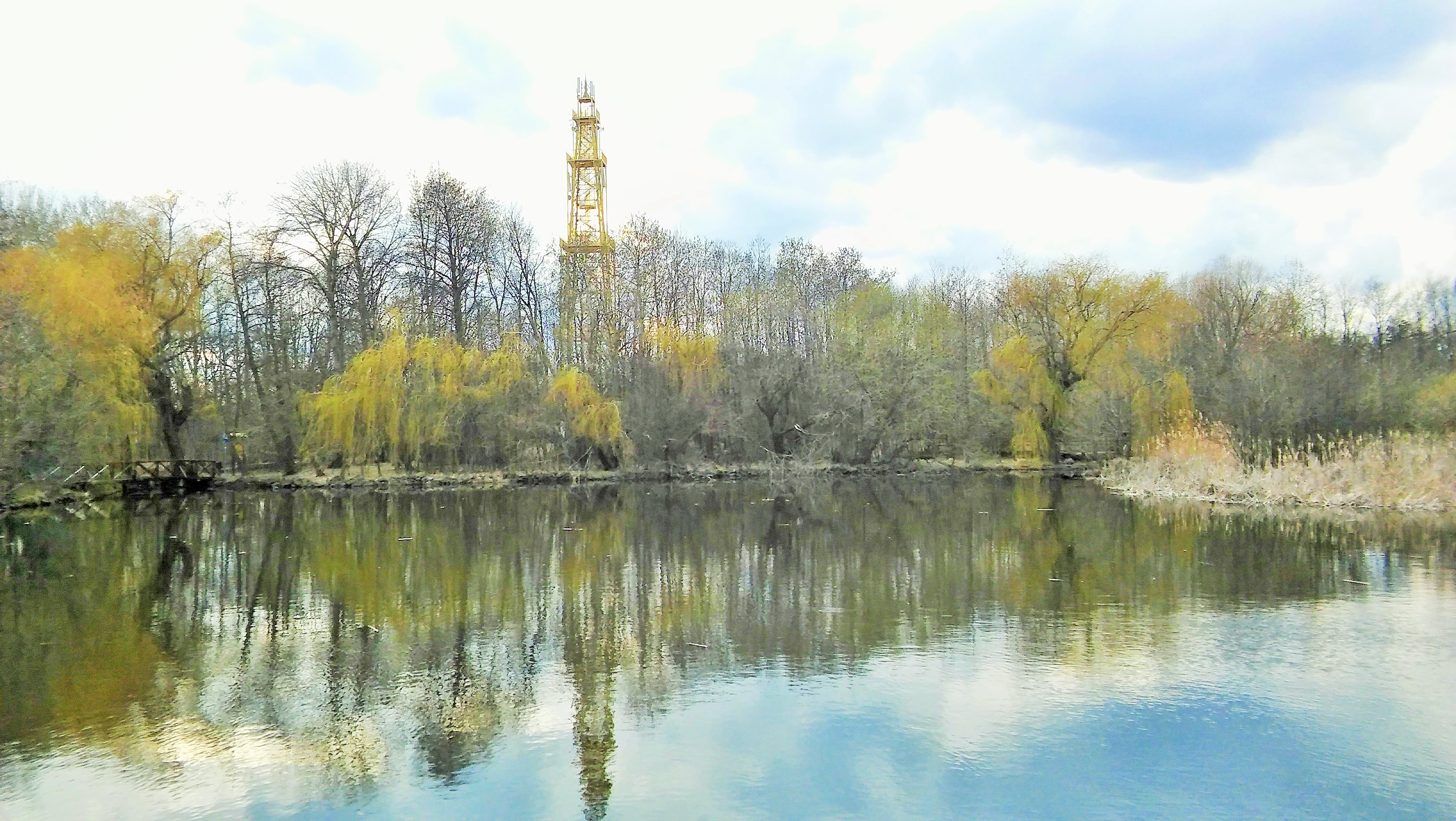
Sás lake

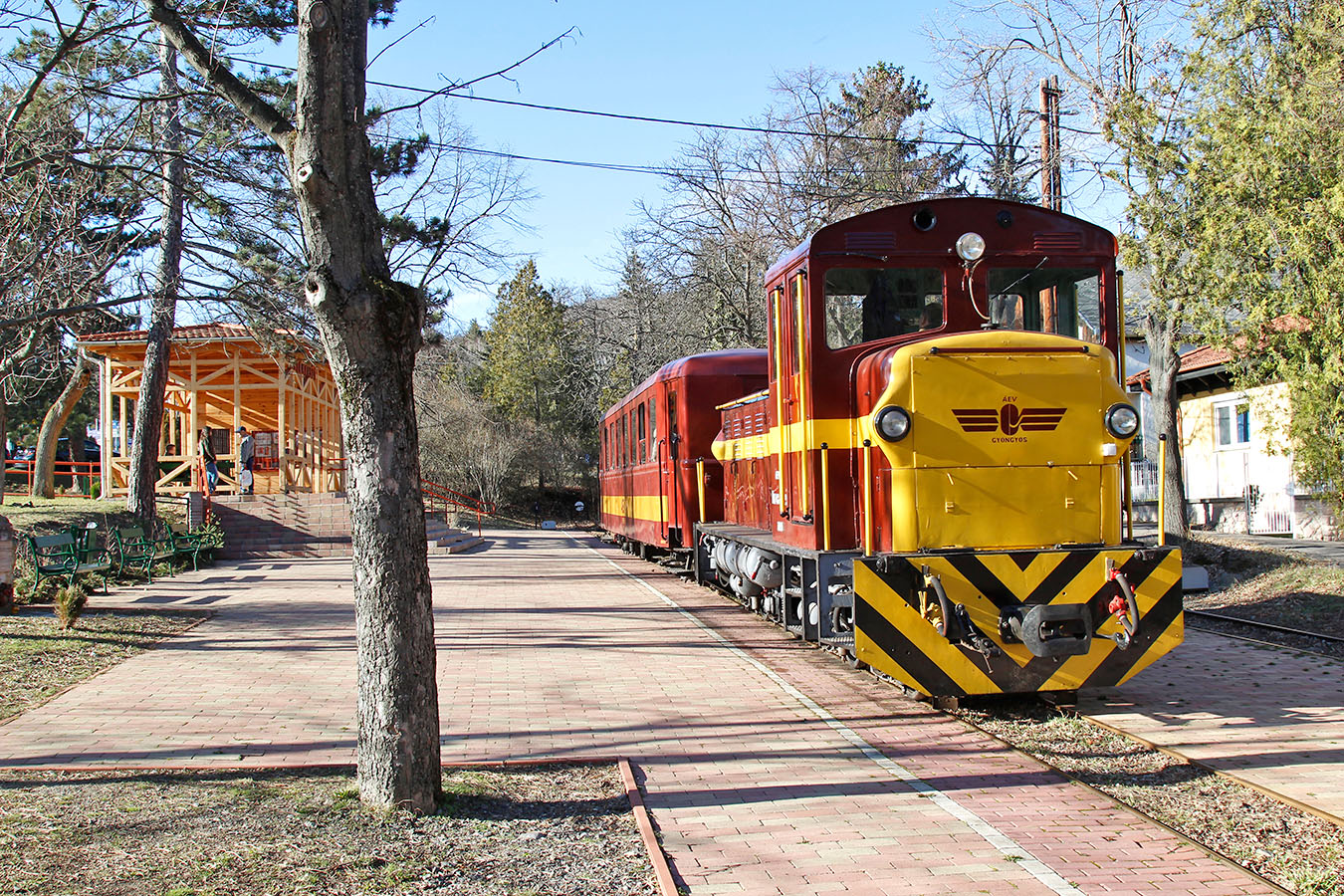
Railway station
