= Esztergomi Vitézek Rugby SE =

Esztergomi Vitézek
- Full name: Esztergomi Vitézek Rugby Athletic and Football Club; Vitézek (Vallors) - First team; Aprodok (Pages) - Reserve team
- Founded: 1983
- Location: Esztergom, Hungary
- Ground: Rugby Club Hotel Field
- President: (Hungary) András Neuzer
- Coach: (Hungary) Lászlő Szölösi
- League: Extraliga
Team kit

Esztergomi Vitézek RAFC (also known as Esztergomi Vitézek Suzuki for sponsorship reasons) is a Hungarian rugby club in Esztergom. They currently play in the Extraliga and are one of the most successful teams in the country, having won nine out of the last ten Championships. Their second team play in Nemzeti Bajnokság I.

== History ==
The club was founded in 1983.

== Honours ==
- Nemzeti Bajnokság I
  - 1999, 2000, 2001, 2002, 2003, 2004, 2005, 2006, 2007, 2008, 2012
- Nemzeti Bajnokság II
  - 1994
- Hungarian Cup
  - 2000, 2001, 2008, 2009, 2010, 2011, 2012
