= Nemzeti Bajnokság II (rugby union) =

Hungarian third-tier sports league

Hungarian National Championship II
- Current season, competition or edition: 2011–12 Nemzeti Bajnokság II (Rugby union) season
- Sport: Rugby union
- Founded: 1989
- No. of teams: 4
- Country: Hungary
- Most recent champion: Szentesi VSC 91-esek Rögbi Szakosztály (2009-10)
- Promotion to: Nemzeti Bajnokság I

The National Championship II (Hungarian: Nemzeti Bajnokság II, also DHL Nemzeti Bajnokság II for sponsorship reasons) is the third and lowest level of domestic club rugby union in Hungary after the Extraliga and the National Championship I. The competition was introduced in 1989. It has undergone a major overhaul for the 2011-12 season, changing into a championship for some newer teams where promotion is unlikely.

== Format and structure ==
For the 2011-12 season, the league is played by five teams who play in a number of centralized tournaments (tournaments held in one location). Matches consist of two halves of twenty minutes.

== Current teams ==
2011–12 season

Location of teams in the Nemzeti Bajnokság II 2011-12

Club	Full name	City	Stadium
Cegléd	Ceglédi Rugby Club	Cegléd	Bedei pálya
Gödöllői Ördögök	Gödöllői Ördögök Rögbi Csapat	Gödöllő	?
Gyöngyösi Farkasok	Gyöngyösi Farkasok Rugby Klub	Gyöngyös	Mátra Szakképzõ Iskola sportpályája, Mátrafüred
SZTE EHÖK	Szegedi Tudományegyetem Egyetemi Hallgatói Önkormányzat Sport Egyesület	Szeged	Etelka sori stadion

- Gyulai Várvédők RK were originally slated to play in this tournament as well, but they seem to have withdrawn altogether, due to lack of playing numbers.

== Champions ==
- 1990 Battai Bulldogok
- 1991
- 1992 Battai Bulldogok
- 1993 Budapest Exiles
- 1994 Esztergomi Vitézek
- 1995
- 1996
- 1997 Szentes
- 1998
- 1999
- 2000 Szentes
- 2001 Esztergomi Vitézek II
- 2002 Esztergomi Vitézek II
- 2003 Esztergomi Vitézek II
- 2004 Pécsi Indiánok
- 2005 Szentes
- 2006 Szentes
- 2007
- 2008
- 2009
- 2010 Szentes

== See also ==
- Rugby union in Hungary
