= Budapest Exiles RFC =

Hungarian rugby union club, based in Budapest

Budapest Exiles
- Full name: Budapest Exiles Rugby Football Club
- Nickname: Exiles
- Founded: 1991; 35 years ago
- Location: Budapest, Hungary
- Ground(s): Spartacus stadium, near Hatar ut metro, Budapest
- President: (France) Francois Taillo
- Coach(es): (England) Neil Johnston and (Venezuela) Thomas Aponte
- League: Extraliga
Team kit

Budapest Exiles RFC is a Hungarian rugby club in Budapest. They are the currently champions in the Hungarian Extra Liga. The club used to be confined to expatriates, but since 2000 Hungarian players have been welcomed to join.

== History ==
The club was founded in 1991 by Neil Currie. They were rapidly followed by Nick Langford (the kit) and Jean-Claude Fédou (the pitch), who both had significant management skills. Other players played a prominent role in the launching such as Tom Howard (the logo) and Mike Caroll (more men), and Philippe Marcheteau (the French). Bain coined the club name "The Exiles" on a recommendation from the former dissident Sulyok Miklos. The management was against a political and provocative title but it stuck with the team. Bain was "called in" to the UK Embassy for explanations, the ambassador having been a 1956 exile he did not take it lightly. The team had a steep initiation curve that culminated in the drafting of the Statutes by Currie and Langford. John Zsigo did all the official translations. Upon approval of the statutes Jean-Claude Fédou was elected first President by a large majority. Niel Currie ended up advising the referees country-wide, and refereeing international matches such as Romania / Hungary and the Sevens in Vienna. That's about it for the inception.
