= Hungarian Extraliga =

Hungarian/Romanian 1st-tier rugby union competition

- Current season, competition or edition: 2026-27 Hungarian Extraliga season
- Sport: Rugby union
- No. of teams: 5
- Country: Hungary (3); Austria (2)
- Relegation to: Nemzeti Bajnokság I

The Extraliga (also DHL Extraliga for sponsorship reasons) is the top tier national rugby union competition in Hungary. There is promotion and relegation involved between the Extraliga and the next level down, Nemzeti Bajnokság I (First Division).

== Format and structure ==
Five teams take part. Each team plays every other team twice, both home and away.

== Current teams ==
2025-26 season

Location of teams in the Extraliga 2025-26

Club	City	Stadium
Budapest Exiles RFC	Budapest	Leányfalu sporttelep
Rugby Union Donau Wien	Vienna, Austria	Union-Trendsportzentrum
Esztergomi Vitézek	Esztergom	Eszetergomi Rögbi Pálya
Honfoglalók Rugby Club (Conquerors Rugby Club)	Nagykőrös	
Vienna Celtic RFC	Vienna, Austria	Austrian Rugby Centre

== See also ==
- Rugby union in Hungary
