= Rugby union in the Soviet Union =

Russian Sport

- The Soviet Coat of Arms
- Country: Soviet Union
- Governing body: Rugby Federation of the Soviet Union
- National team: Soviet Union
- First played: 1880s, Moscow
- Registered players: 10,000 (in 1974)
- Clubs: ~300

National competitions
- Rugby World Cup; European Nations Cup; Rugby World Cup Sevens; IRB Sevens World Series

Club competitions
- Soviet Championship (rugby); Soviet Cup (rugby)

Rugby union in the Soviet Union was a moderately popular sport. It was most popular in the Georgian SSR; parts of the Russian SFSR such as Moscow and certain regions in Siberia like Krasnoyarsk; and Alma-Ata, the capital of the Kazakh SSR. Rugby enjoyed a more limited popularity in the Ukrainian SSR, Minsk in the Byelorussian SSR and parts of the RSFSR such as Leningrad and areas in Southern Russia, including Krasnodar. Rugby gained a significant following due to the vast size of the Soviet Union, but was never a major sport; despite many attempts to develop the sport, which Soviet citizens came to nickname the "leather melon" due to the shape of the ball. Still, an early championship in 1960 gives an idea of the sheer scale of Soviet rugby: one hundred teams from over thirty cities took part.

Although the name "Russia" or "Soviet Russia" was often used as a synonym for the USSR, this did not give a true reflection in rugby terms: there were regularly six or seven Georgians in the USSR side. Russians made up only about half of the Soviet population, the other half, nearly a hundred million Soviet citizens, were not Russians.

Sports clubs were invariably not autonomous bodies, but were part of Palaces of Culture, or Universities, or Military Bodies, such as air force academies and the Red Army itself. These were the so called Voluntary Sports Societies of the Soviet Union. As David Lane writes in the Politics and Society in the USSR:

"Palaces of Culture" are the equivalent of the English workingmen's club... Sports clubs and stadia... often form part of the Palace of Culture complex... The sports clubs embrace a wide variety of sports; in 1972, there were 25 million participants in union sports societies."

These Palaces of Culture were run by trade unions, who both financed them, and also took any revenue raised from them in matches etc. Each sports club had its own rules and membership cards, and was subsidised by trade union dues. To join a club, a person paid the small sum of thirty kopecks a year.

Clubs were named for their trade union. For example, RC Lokomotiv Moscow (now a rugby league club) was part of the Lokomotiv Society, which was in turn connected to the All-Union Voluntary Sports Society of rail transport workers' Trade Unions. (The "RC" stands for "Rugby Club") Ironically, this naming system has proven surprisingly resilient and even today is to be found in the names of various Eastern European sports clubs, long after the fall of the Iron Curtain. The main name elements in sports clubs, with their trade union affiliations were as follows (an example of a rugby club with the element is also listed):

- Буреве́стник- Burevestnik - Students., e.g. Burevestnik Moscow
- Локомотив - Lokomotiv - Railway workers., e.g. Lokomotiv Tbilisi
- Спартак - Spartak - "White Collar" workers.
- Водник - Vodnik - River transport.
- Зенит - Zenit - the arms industry.

As well as the trade unions, there were two non-T.U. prefixes:

- Динамо - Dinamo/Dynamo - The MVD (Ministry of Internal Affairs - The Soviet Militia & the KGB, along with its predecessor organisations). e.g. Dynamo Penza, Dinamo Tbilisi, RC Dinamo-Center
- Трудовые резервы - Trudovye Rezervy/Labour reserves - Students at technical colleges. e.g. Trud Krasnoyarsk

In the 1938 Soviet Championship for example, the first, second and third places were all won by Moscow teams - Dynamo, Spartak and Burevestnik respectively.

The well-known expatriate Romanian rugby writer, Chris Thau wrote in the late 1980s about Soviet rugby's failure to break into the international mainstream:

"Opinions on Soviet rugby vary widely. One school of thought maintains that, in spite of the superior athletic potential of the average Soviet player, the mechanistic nature of their tuition system does not allow for the creativity normally associated with the game of rugby."

== Climate ==
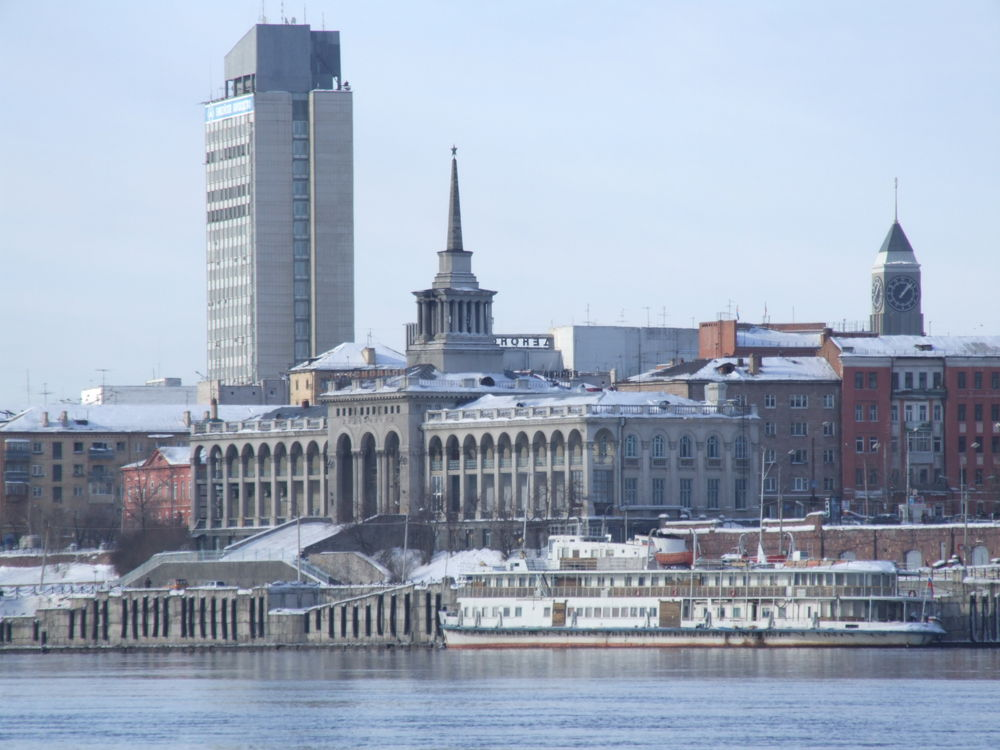
Krasnoyarsk

Climate was a particular problem for rugby in the Soviet Union. In 1978, a game in the RSFSR set the record for one of the coldest matches ever to be played. Krasnoyarsk played Polyechika Alma at -23' C. Because Krasnoyarsk had travelled over 2,000 km to be there, the game was not called off. Instead, players resorted to wearing balaclavas, gloves, and several pairs of tracksuits to combat the cold. The extreme climate of the former USSR remains a problem in many regions, with winter sometimes being a split season, or the game of snow rugby being played.

Many parts of the region spend a large part of the year under a blanket of snow. In northern parts of the USSR, most open ground was permafrost, leading to further problems with pitches, especially with the placement of goalposts. Other regions such as Soviet Central Asia often had desert climates, leading to temperature extremes, and water shortages for the pitch.

"In the north of the Soviet Union, snow covers most areas by November, hindering many forms of outdoor recreation, but stimulating winter sports and ice recreation."

== Governing bodies and administration ==
Like almost everything else in the USSR, rugby was ultimately answerable to the Soviet government, albeit through a number of different channels. Officially, the Rugby Federation of the USSR (RFUSSR; sometimes translated as the "Rugby Union of the Soviet Union") was the top governing body of Soviet rugby and centrally controlled. However, as a Soviet organisation, it was in fact part of a complex web of administrations, bureaucracies and so on, and linked to the Soviet government rather than being an independent body on the lines of the major rugby nations. The RFUSSR was answerable to, and funded by the USSR Committee on Physical Culture and Sport which was the umbrella organisation for all Soviet sport, and this in turn was attached to the USSR Council of Ministers.

In reality, Soviet rugby operated under two or three different systems, which more or less ran in parallel, and only one of which was directly related to rugby:

- Central rugby administration: The RFUSSR operated throughout the USSR. This in turn was made up of fifteen national rugby unions for each of the republics (SSRs).
- SSR sports administration: Each of the fifteen national rugby unions was not only part of the RFUSSR, but were also part of the Sports Committee of its respective SSR, which dealt with various sports at a local level. Each national republic was also further subdivided into an urban and a rural sports society.
- Institutional affiliations: The majority of Soviet rugby clubs were part of non-rugby bodies, in addition to the RFUSSR. These included certain trade unions, multi-sport clubs, colleges/universities or military bodies, which also operated throughout the state. There were some thirty six sports societies in the Soviet Union, and all but two were run by trade unions. Each of these "vertical" general sports bodies were run by the USSR Committee on Physical Culture and Sport, which was above the RFUSSR.

Lastly, there was the CSKA (Central Army Sports Club), which administered rugby in garrisons throughout the Soviet Union and was centrally rather than nationally controlled. For children, there were the Sports schools (ДЮСШ), but these tended to concentrate more on Olympic sports, and neglected rugby.

Equipment and amenities came from the state's Glavsportprom, and the state sports publishing agency was Sovetsky Sport. Dinamo was the biggest sports manufacturer, and had many retail sports shops; its profits were ploughed back into the organisation.

The RFUSSR was founded in 1936, and re-established in 1968, the Rugby Federation of the USSR was founded. Over the years, the various rugby unions of each of the SSRs were set up - most of the national governing bodies of the Soviet successor states can trace themselves back to these.

In the latter years of the USSR, Soviet rugby also affiliated to two international bodies. In 1975, the RFUSSR became a member of FIRA-AER, which was then the largest rugby governing body in the world. This was followed, just over a decade later by membership of the International Rugby Football Board.

== History ==
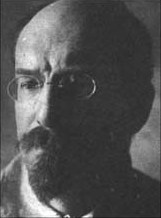
People's Commissar Anatoly Lunacharsky was one of the earliest advocates of the sport in the Soviet Union. By a strange coincidence, he died in Menton, France, where William Webb Ellis is buried.

In the first half of the 20th century, Soviet citizens endured the brunt of two world wars, two revolutions (1905 & 1917), a devastating Civil War, and a number of famines. In addition, there was some severe political repression, notably the Great Purge in the 1930s, which led to many people being sent to the Gulag. It is understandable that under such circumstances, a team sport such as rugby could not flourish and was low on the list of people's priorities. Only with the less repressive regime of the post-Stalin period did Soviet rugby begin to establish a firm base.

=== Indigenous football codes ===
The Soviet Union had a number of different indigenous football codes, some of which bore a resemblance to rugby. Amongst these were lelo burti (Georgia), shvalyga (Russia and Ukraine), and kila. (Russia and Ukraine), aimtskachara (Abkhazia), and various forms of buzkashi also existed in Soviet Central Asia.

"The game took place over a wide area sometimes stretching for several kilometres on very rough ground. The contestants would have to contend with spurs, hills, valleys, woods. cascading streams and marshes. Their task was to get a ball into a certain place, say, over the settlement boundary or to the foot of the mountain. Any means necessary could be employed to drive the ball forward — feet or hands. Sometimes they would play the game on horseback."

=== Introduction of rugby ===
Rugby football in the Russian Empire pre-dated the Russian Revolution by a number of years, but it was only played sporadically. It appears to have been the first (non-indigenous) football code to be played in Russia, around a decade before the introduction of association football. Mr Hopper, a Scotsman, who worked in Moscow arranged a match in the 1880s; the first soccer match was in 1892. In 1886, however, the Russian police clamped down on rugby because they considered it "brutal, and liable to incite demonstrations and riots" Condemnation by the tsar's police probably deterred many people from playing, and records of rugby over the next thirty years are sparse. Some rugby union was still being played in 1908.

The first official match, played in Moscow, did not take place until 1923 several years after the Revolution, and in the same year, the first formal rugby teams in the USSR were organised by M.S. Koslov (М. С. Козлов), A.A. Markushevich (А. А. Маркушевич), A.V. Pravdin (А. В. Правдин), N.Ia. Kolli (Н. Я. Колли) and others.

Given the vast area of the USSR, and its complex and turbulent history, it seems more likely that rugby had multiple introductions and reintroductions to various regions completely independent of one another.

For example, it seems that rugby was introduced to Georgia independently of its introduction to Russia, and moreover, the game bears a distinct resemblance to a pre-existing Georgian folk sport known as lelo. There were several unsuccessful attempts to introduce rugby into Georgia, the earliest known being in 1928.

=== Early history ===
Amongst Bolsheviks, there were two main schools of thought when it came to sports planning and debate - the Proletkul'tists and the Hygienists:

"The crucial question was being debated was not what form sport should take, but whether competitive sport should exist at all in the new workers' state. After all, some revolutionaries argued, sports such as athletics, soccer, rowing, tennis and gymnastics were invented by the industrial bourgeoisie for their own diversion and character training for future careers as captains of industry and empire. It was thought perfectly natural by some after the Russian Revolution that a new pattern of recreation would emerge, reflecting the dominant values and needs in the new Socialist state... the two major groups that regarded sport as debasing workers' physical culture and inculcating non-socialist habits were known as the Hygienists and the Proletkul'tists (from 'proletarian culture')."

The Hygienists thought sport implied competition (which communism was supposed to oppose) and was injurious to health. They favoured:

"non-commercialised forms of recreation that dispensed with grandstands and spectators. Sport, they said, diverted attention from providing recreation for all."

The Hygienists did not like team sports, but preferred athletics, swimming and rowing - as long as they were solo events against the clock, or one's previous best. The Hygienists had control over the Supreme Council of Physical Culture (the government sports body), most of the sporting press, the Ministry of Health, and physical education colleges. Moreover, they excluded PE from schools, and by extension team sports, arguing that "the existence of physical education teachers is a sign of pedagogical illiteracy."

The Proletkul'tists considered sport bourgeois, and preferred mass displays and folk sports, and their influence persisted around a decade after the Revolution. As a result Soviet sport during the 1920s tended to be fairly isolationist, with the exception of the Spartakiad.

The promotion of sport gained support from other quarters. For example, in 1926, the Ukrainian Party Central Committee passed a resolution in which they expressed the hope that:

"physical culture would become the vehicle of the new life... a means of isolating young people from the evil effects of prostitution, home-made alcohol and the street."

Although nominally a proletkul'tist, the first Soviet People's Commissar of Enlightenment responsible for culture and education, Anatoly Vasilyevich Lunacharsky (Анатолий Васильевич Луначарский - 1875-1933) had other ideas. He was one of the early Russian rugby enthusiasts, and "called for a careful study of foreign sporting experience and the inclusion of everything worthwhile into Soviet sport, particularly boxing and rugby." Lunacharsky was one of the most genuinely cosmopolitan and intellectual of the early Bolsheviks, and a prolific writer on all kinds of cultural and leisure activity from the "high" arts to sports, and was a significant contributor to физикультура и спорт (Fizkul'tura i sport), the leading Soviet sports magazine of the time. However, Lunacharsky received some opposition from some others within the Proletkult movement, as James Riordan points out:

"To many 'Proletkul'tists', the recourse to 'bourgeois' institutions such as sport seemed a compromise, a withdrawal from already conquered positions. They might have exerted more influence over the movement, however, if they had had a better-defined programme of proletarian physical culture to take the place of organised sports... Subsequently, several 'Proletkul'tist' notions were taken up and incorporated in Soviet sport, while their originators were rejected (and mostly liquidated after 1934)."

In his book, Thoughts on Sport, Lunacharsky hardly allayed this charge, saying:

"[Rugby is] a джентльменский бой [dzhentel'mensky boi - gentlemanly combat] that encourages courageous qualities; it is a sport that should be widely practised."

Lunacharsky would later die in France (coincidentally at Menton, where William Webb Ellis was buried), and had the honour of being buried in the Kremlin Wall Necropolis. In the 1930s, his works were banned, and would not appear again until the late 1950s, when he was rehabilitated and seen as one of the most open-minded and forward thinking of the Russian Revolutionaries.

Soviet rugby might have had a much higher profile in the pre-war period if Lunarcharsky had lived a few years longer. But judging by what happened to his writings, it is unlikely that Lunarcharsky could have avoided Stalin's purges - and would have ended up dead or in a prison camp.

=== 1930s ===
There was a close link-up between Soviet sport and the military, as the USSR felt itself to be hemmed in by unfriendly states. GTO ("Gotov k trudu i oborone") - Ready for defence and labour - was the name of the national fitness programme, which was established in 1931.

After the end of the Civil War, rugby began to take root. Rugby was introduced into several secondary schools and colleges in 1926, and again in 1932.

In 1934, two teams played an exhibition match in Moscow initiating the Moscow Championship, and matches were being played in a number of other Soviet cities. According to Victor and Jennifer Louis,

"When the first Rugby Championship was held in the Soviet union in 1934, critics compared it to a battle of gladiators."

In October, 1935, Moscow played Minsk, and won 6-0.

The first Soviet Championship took place in 1936, and there was another in 1939. In 1937, there was an unofficial All-Union competition in which two Moscow based teams played ones from Minsk and Gorky.

In 1938, the USSR Cup was held, and Dynamo Moscow won.

An ongoing problem in the 1930s was a lack of proper facilities and equipment. The games also did not receive sufficient publicity to generate a public interest, so that the Soviet authorities large gave up in their effort until after the Stalinist period.

=== 1940s ===
Play continued at a low level during the 1940s, but the games were one-offs, and were non-championship.

Attempts to establish rugby in Georgia took place in 1940 and in 1947.

The only two tournaments were held in Tbilisi (1947) and Kyiv (1949). Even in Moscow only 3 rugby clubs continue to play and slowly disband.

In 1949, rugby union was forbidden throughout the USSR during the "fight against cosmopolitanism". [mostly untrue, but would have suffered persecution]

=== 1950: Post-Stalin era ===
Soviet teams once more began to be formed in the late 1950s, and the game underwent a renaissance, thanks to the efforts of B.M. Egupov (Б. М. Егупов), G.G. Mrelashvili (Г. Г. Мрелашвили) and A.A. Sorokin (А. А. Сорокин). This is the same period in which the rugby advocate Lunacharsky was rehabilitated, and his writings were released from censorship.

Competition was resumed in 1957-58, after a "complete absence of 10 years".

Llanelli toured Czechoslovakia and the USSR in the 1950s. In 1957, led by R. H. Williams, Llanelli played in the final of the World Youth Games in Moscow. Llanelli lost to the Romanian side Grivita Rosie. It was a game marred by such "hideous and appalling violence" that it hindered the development of the game in Russia for a number of years.

The Moscow Civil Guard were called out as a result of the brawl between Llanelli and Bucharest.

Rugby was reintroduced to Georgia by Jacques Haspekian, an Armenian man from Marseille in France who taught the game to students in the late 1950s through to the mid-1960s, although he then subsequently returned in France. He is still alive and living in Marseille, he was interviewed on French radio on the occasion of Georgia playing France in the 2007 Rugby World Cup.

The very first rugby session was held on October 15, 1959 in Tbilisi, at the racecourse, where 20 people attended the meeting. The first Georgian club formed was the GPI (Georgian Polytechnical Institute), now known as "Qochebi".

=== 1960s ===
Along with the revival in the late 1950s, rugby received another boost in the 1960s, when Soviet industry started to manufacture its own equipment. The 1960s saw massive Soviet investment in sport - for example, while between 1953 and 1964, the government spent an average of 16 million rubles per year, in 1965, it spent no less than 40 million. In August 1966, the Soviet government drew up a spending plan, which resulted in some republics increasing their sports spending by as much as 6 or 7 times. In the Russian RFSR, in 1967, the expenditure was more than double the amount spent in all the post-war years put together.

Serious efforts to organise the sport took place in the early 1960s, when championships were held between clubs, and the Soviet Championship recommenced in 1966. The decade was a golden age for, with a large number of new teams being set up in many parts of the Soviet Union, including areas such as Tajikistan and Uzbekistan. A school for coaches was opened during this period, and physical training colleges throughout the USSR introduced lectures on rugby union as part of their courses. The students of the MHTS in Moscow were also a major force in the promotion of the game.

In 1967, rugby was introduced to Moldavia.

In the 1960s too, Soviet rugby started to reach out, often without hope of immediate success, to international competition in order to acquire experience. The Soviet international team played their first match against a foreign side in 1960, when they played a Polish side.

==== National organisations ====
In the 1960s, a number of the national bodies were set up, such as Lithuania's in 1961, Latvia's in 1963, Georgia's 1964, and Russia's in 1966.

In 1968, the Rugby Federation of the USSR was founded.

=== 1970s ===
In 1974, there were 10,000 registered Soviet rugby players, including more than 200 Soviet Masters of Sport. In the same year, twenty teams took part in the national championships. Notable Soviet players of this period included B.P. Gavrilov (Б. П. Гаврилов), A.G. Grigor'iants (А. Г. Григорьянц) and I.I. Kiziriia (И. И. Кизирия), all of whom were Masters of Sport.

In 1973, Moscow Slava RFC toured Wales. After a game in which Slava played Rhymney RFC, and lost 10-8, there was some banter in the bar -

"Well Boyo, now it's time to defect."
"No, thank you, I don't like your weather."

In 1975, the Soviet national team played their first ever match.

In 1977, James Riordan was able to predict,

"In the not-so-distant future, it is not unrealistic to forecast, the USSR is likely to be a world power in world badminton, rugby, grass hockey and motor racing, at all of which its sportsmen are practising hard."

At the time, this was not bad prognostication; however, political and economic factors within the Eastern Bloc in the 1980s ensured this was not to be.

The former All Black scrum half Chris Laidlaw, writing at the end of the 1970s, saw rugby as a positive force in east-west relations at the time:

"Rugby has become the ping-pong of outdoor sports in its capacity to spread goodwill between East and West. Over the last 30 or 40 years it has spread through Eastern Europe, establishing itself strongly in Romania and Yugoslavia, Hungary and into the USSR. The fact that a Russian team [sic] has finally played a full-scale, if unofficial Test match against France speaks for itself.

"Rugby tours between countries on either side of the Iron Curtain have generated considerable political interest among the governments concerned, and the results can be quite astonishing. The recent Rumanian tour of New Zealand, for instance, germinated other contacts between the two countries and was partly instrumental in the establishment of new trade agreements which otherwise might not have begun."

Chris Laidlaw writing of the open secret of shamateurism in Soviet sport said:

"So far as the East Europeans and the Russians are concerned, who knows where the incentives lie? In such societies rugby, like many other sports before it, is becoming an expression of national achievement and therefore the subject of careful nurturing. Yet, is the risk of the double standard, so evident in the athletic arena, permeating the East Europeans' approach to rugby so great as to justify the exclusion of the Communist world indefinitely from regular rugby competition?"

=== 1980s ===
A notable Russian player of the 1980s was Igor Mironov who played for the Barbarians several times during the period.

The Great Soviet Encyclopedia states that "all Socialist countries" in Europe played rugby during this period.

Soviet Rugby was beginning to emerge as a significant presence on the world stage. Soviet delegates were amongst those who went to the centenary congress of the International Rugby Football Board in 1986. Soviet women did not make much headway into team sport, especially rugby, until the advent of perestroika.

The USSR supposedly turned down its invitation to the 1987 Rugby World Cup, because of its distaste for the apartheid regime of South Africa. However, South Africa was not invited in the end. While the Great Soviet Encyclopedia states that rugby is popular in Great Britain, New Zealand, France, Romania and Australia, it tellingly makes no mention of South Africa. Chris Thau says that France approached the USSR before 1987 on the issue, and that the Soviets said that they would be happy to participate if South Africa was not invited. In the end, South Africa was not invited, but the USSR did not attend either. It has been said that:

"No nation outside the Third World did more than the USSR to oppose apartheid in sport and have South Africa banned from world sports forums and arenas."

The Soviets leaned on other nations heavily:

"Over the years, Ferasse has resisted Eastern Bloc pressure to break with South Africa. At one point Moscow threatened to set up a rival Federation, but the Rumanians, with whom the French have long had good relationships, stood by France. Moscow tried again later by threatening to call off the France v. USSR match in Toulouse in November 1978. Once again Ferasse held firm and the Russians went to France, where they were beaten 29-7"

In 1988, Edgard Taturian, the Soviet director of rugby coaching, said in an outspoken interview that the USSR required ten times as many coaches and referees as it had. He admitted that a more holistic approach was needed:

"We need to improve the standard of refereeing too. The development of the game in the Soviet Union has to be based on a chain: coach-referee-team-supporter. All four parameters are equally important."

Crawley RFC was due to tour Russia in early 1980s, and had both raised funds, and gained approval from the Soviet Embassy. However, they received a stern letter from the Rugby Football Union telling them that "you're not big enough or good enough." They toured country only in 1989.

A running joke in French rugby circles ran that FIRA's nightmare was to have "Yugoslavia playing Bulgaria refereed by a Soviet."

Some members of the Soviet Union were also veterans at this point - for example, Igor Mironov, Roman Khairulin and Alexander Tikonov had all been playing at international level for over a decade. Igor Frantsusov, the scrum-half had been playing for slightly less time, but was still a veteran in rugby terms.

=== Break up of Soviet Union ===
Map of Post-Soviet states in alphabetical order, with links to contemporary rugby union: 1. Armenia, 2. Azerbaijan, 3. Belarus, 4. Estonia, 5. Georgia, 6. Kazakhstan, 7. Kyrgyzstan, 8. Latvia, 9. Lithuania, 10. Moldova, 11. Russia, 12. Tajikistan, 13. Turkmenistan, 14. Ukraine, 15. Uzbekistan

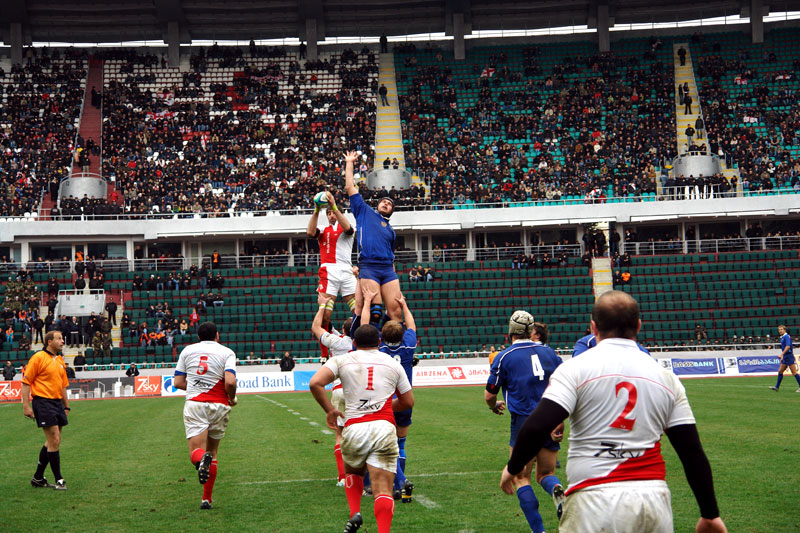
The two strongest post-Soviet teams: Georgia playing Russia.

The collapse of the Soviet Union was a severe blow to rugby in the region, which resulted in the removal of state subsidies, and forced many of the smaller clubs to dissolve or start afresh. In the case of Russia, the two main centres, Moscow and Siberia were thousands of miles apart. Georgia was one of the few places with a large number of clubs remaining, partly because it had become popular there, and its league was based in a relatively compact area.

While the USSR's dissolution was ongoing, in 1990 the Soviet rugby team visited Ireland and the United States for the first time. In this period, the Soviet Union women's national rugby union team played for the first time, and enjoyed a brief existence.

The Soviet Union did not take part in the qualification rounds for the 1991 Rugby World Cup - European qualification. The 1991 Rugby World Cup coincided with the final stages of the collapse of the Soviet Union. The RWC itself took place in October and November 1991, around two months after the unsuccessful coup d'état attempt against Gorbachev, which is often seen as being the end of the Soviet Union. In November 1991, Boris Yeltsin issued a decree banning the CPSU throughout the Russian republic.

As a stopgap measure, the former USSR competed under the Commonwealth of Independent States banner, this arrangement terminating in 1992. The side played four matches before its dissolution.

The most successful "successor" rugby team has been that of Georgia, which competed in the 2003 Rugby World Cup, the 2007 Rugby World Cup, and the 2011 Rugby World Cup. In 2007, they nearly upset Ireland, missing out on a potential winning try late in the match, and defeated Namibia 30-0. In 2011, they had a respectable performance against Scotland, losing 15–6, defeated Romania 25–9. No other ex-Soviet nation other than Georgia and Russia has ever qualified for the Rugby World Cup.

Russia remains to date the next most successful team after Georgia, participating in the 2011 Rugby World Cup; however, the rest of the former USSR has not fared so well. A notable exception was the Latvian rugby union sevens team which succeeded in reaching the Rugby World Cup Sevens in 1993. This surprised the international rugby community, as at the time there were only two rugby pitches in the entire country. There are some other notable exceptions, e.g. Ukraine who were able to call on the services of Igor Bokov the former Soviet coach.

The era also brought a new challenge in the form of rugby league. Although rugby league in England had traditionally played on its working class credentials, in the Soviet Union it had been seen as a bourgeois pursuit, due to its links with business through professionalism. When the Soviet Union collapsed, rugby league tried to buy out Russian rugby union. A notable defector was RC Lokomotiv, the former train workers club in Moscow.

In the mid-1990s, Russia had 222 clubs, and 6,000 players spread out across the entire country [rather speculative and untrue figure]; Georgia had 40 clubs; Ukraine had 20 clubs and 750 players; Latvia had only 8 clubs; and Lithuania had 14 clubs;

== Popularity ==
Although such tournaments as the Soviet Cup and the Soviet Championship existed, rugby never reached its full potential in the Soviet Union. Of the two Rugby codes, Rugby union was the more popular; Rugby league only attracting fans and athletes after the collapse of Communism.

Victor and Jennifer Louis wrote in 1980 that:

"It seemed in the early 1960s that rugby was burgeoning throughout the Soviet Union, but today it is clear that the game is played above all by students and mostly in Moscow."

Chris Thau identified two major problems hindering the spread rugby in the late Soviet Union:

"Many players start playing late in life, either after failing to establish themselves in an Olympic discipline, or after entering a University, a Polytechnic, or a Military Academy where the game is already well established."

However, by 1989 Rugby was well-established across the Eastern bloc. Since the dissolution of the USSR, Rugby has become particularly popular in Georgia, where it is the de facto national sport.

After the Second World War, there was competition with the west and not just in sport. From the late 1950s-early 1970s, there was a reduction in Soviet people's work time, which caused an increase in their leisure time. Sport was seen as:

"one of the best and most comprehensive ways and means of explaining to people throughout the world the advantages of the socialist system over capitalism."

With this in mind, participation in sport was strongly encouraged from the grass roots level upwards.

In 1926, 18% of the Soviet population lived in towns, but by 1978, this had risen to 63% (164 million) Each new planned town included a sports centre.

The 1930s saw the

"flourishing of all manner of competitive sports with spectator appeal, of leagues, of cups, championships, popularity-polls and cults of sporting heroes. All were designed to provide recreation and diversion for the fast growing urban populace."

The Soviet government spent 12,600 million rubles on sport and health each year in the 1970s and 1980s, which was approximately 0.03% of the state budget.

Rather like their Olympic counterparts, Soviet rugby players had a fair degree of shamateurism. Both the Olympics and rugby union were officially amateur, but this was not really the case. For example, the Dinamo clubs were sponsored and financed by the KGB, but no one could say that openly that some athletes were full-time shamateurs, and received bonuses for winning including dollars. Masters of Sport were full time, and paid by their sports society. They received 180 rubles each year, plus 30-40 rubles if they were capped for the USSR team paid for by the USSR sports committee. There were frequently unofficial bonuses, and some people could be Masters of Sport for life, meaning that they would receive pay long after their retirement.

== Domestic competition ==
- Soviet Championship (rugby)
- Soviet Cup (rugby)

National champions included teams from the sports clubs of the Moscow Higher Technical School (МВТУ), the Iu. A. Gagarin Air Force Academy (ВВА им. Ю. А. Гагарина; the future VVA-Podmoskovye Monino), and Fili ("Фили").

The two largest and most successful sports clubs were the Central House of the Red Army (the Central Sports Club of the Army, TSSK), and Динамо (Dinamo/Dynamo - the security services).

Between 1961 and 1974, the Soviet team took part in more than 100 international matches.

== National team ==
The USSR side consisted of representatives of all constituent republics within the Soviet Union.

They played their first game against a Polish team in 1960.

=== The FIRA Trophy 1974-1997 ===
Year	Winner	Second place	Third place
1973/1974	France	Romania	Spain
1974/1975	Romania	France	Italy
1975/1976	France	Italy	Romania
1976/1977	Romania	France	Italy
1977/1978	France	Romania	Spain
1978/1979	France	Romania	Soviet Union
1979/1980	France	Romania	Italy
1980/1981	Romania	France	Soviet Union
1981/1982	France	Italy	Romania
1982/1983	Romania	Italy	Soviet Union
1983/1984	France	Romania	Italy
1984/1985	France	Soviet Union	Italy
1985/1987	France	Soviet Union	Romania
1987/1989	France	Soviet Union	Romania
1989/1990	France	Soviet Union	Romania

There was also a women's team, but they only played several games.

http://www.fira-aer-rugby.com/forum2007/viewtopic.php?f=2&t=3186&hilit=

http://www.rugby.by/

== See also ==
- Armenia national rugby union team
- Azerbaijan national rugby union team
- Belarus national rugby union team
- Estonia national rugby union team
- Georgia teams
  - Georgia national rugby union team
  - Georgia national rugby sevens team
- Kazakhstan teams
  - Kazakhstan national rugby union team
  - Kazakhstan women's national rugby union team
  - Kazakhstan national rugby union team (sevens)
- Kyrgyzstan teams
  - Kyrgyzstan national rugby union team
  - Kyrgyzstan women's national rugby union team
- Latvia national rugby union team
- Lithuania national rugby union team
- Moldova teams
  - Moldova national rugby union team
  - Moldova men's national rugby sevens team
- Russia teams
  - Russia national rugby union team
  - Russia women's national rugby union team
  - Russia national rugby sevens team
- Tajikistan national rugby union team
- Turkmenistan national rugby union team
- Ukraine teams
  - Ukraine national rugby union team
  - Ukraine national rugby union team (sevens)
- Uzbekistan teams
  - Uzbekistan national rugby union team
  - Uzbekistan women's national rugby union team
- SV Dynamo, a multi-sports club of the German Democratic Republic.
