= Lists of rugby union players =

Lists of rugby union players include the following:

== By country ==
- List of rugby union players by country
- List of Argentina national rugby union players
- List of Australia national rugby union players
- List of Australia national rugby union team captains
- List of Australian women's national rugby union players
- List of Basque rugby union players
- List of British & Irish Lions players
- List of uncapped British & Irish Lions rugby union players
- List of Canada national rugby union players
- List of England national rugby union players
- List of England national rugby union team records
- List of England women's national rugby union players
- List of England rugby union footballers killed in the world wars
- List of Saracens F.C. players selected for international rugby
- List of Fiji national rugby union players
- List of France national rugby union players
- List of Georgia national rugby union players
- List of Germany national rugby union players
- List of Hong Kong national rugby union players
- List of Hungary national rugby union players
- List of Ireland national rugby union players
- List of Italy national rugby union players
- List of Japan national rugby union players
- List of Luxembourg national rugby union players
- List of Montenegro national rugby union players
- List of Namibia national rugby union players
- List of New Zealand national rugby union players
- List of Romania national rugby union players
- List of Russia national rugby union players
- List of Samoa national rugby union players
- List of Scotland national rugby union players
- List of Scotland B national rugby union players
- List of Scotland rugby union players killed in World War I
- List of Scottish rugby union players killed in World War II
- List of South Africa national rugby union players
- List of South Africa national rugby union team captains
- List of South Africa national rugby sevens players
- List of South Africa national under-18 rugby union team players
- List of South Africa national under-20 rugby union team players
- List of Spain national rugby union players
- List of Tonga national rugby union players
- List of United States national rugby union players
- List of Uruguay national rugby union players
- List of Wales national rugby union players
- List of Wales national rugby union team captains
- List of Wales rugby union footballers killed in the world wars

== Other lists ==
- List of cricket and rugby union players
- List of dual-code rugby internationals
- List of players who have converted from one football code to another
- List of international rugby union families
- List of international rugby union players killed in World War I
- List of leading international rugby union drop goal scorers
- List of leading rugby union test point scorers
- List of leading rugby union test try scorers
- List of Olympic medalists in rugby
- List of Olympic medalists in Rugby sevens
- List of rugby union players who have represented more than one nation
- List of rugby union test caps leaders
- List of Rugby World Cup hat-tricks
- List of Rugby World Cup red cards
- List of Rugby World Cup try scorers
- List of Ulster Rugby players of the professional era
- List of winners of multiple Rugby World Cups
- International Rugby Hall of Fame
- World Rugby Hall of Fame
