= List of rugby union players by country =

Rugby union, often simply referred to as rugby, is a full contact team sport which originated in England in the early 19th century. One of the two codes of rugby football, it is based on running with the ball in hand. It is played with an oval-shaped ball on a field up to 100 metres (330 ft) long and 70 metres (230 ft) wide with H-shaped goal posts on each goal line.

As of 2011, more than 5 million people currently play rugby union in more than 117 countries.

== Algeria ==
- Boumedienne Allam

== Argentina ==
For the full list of Argentina international rugby players see: List of Argentina national rugby union players

== Australia ==
For the full list of Australia international rugby players see: List of Australia national rugby union players

== Austria ==
- Mani Dehimi

== Belgium ==
- Jacques Rogge

== Brazil ==
- João Luiz da Ros
- Charles William Miller
- Paulo do Rio Branco

== Canada ==
- Dan Baugh
- Mark Cardinal
- Al Charron
- Jamie Cudmore
- Glen Ennis
- Norm Hadley
- Mike James
- Dave Lougheed
- Gord MacKinnon
- Gareth Rees
- Bobby Ross (rugby union)
- Rod Snow
- Winston Stanley
- Christian Stewart
- John Tait (rugby union)
- Kevin Tkachuk
- D. T. H. van der Merwe
- Morgan Williams
- Nik Witkowski
- Colin Yukes

== Chile ==
- Ian Campbell
- Sergio Valdes

== Cook Islands ==
- Tommy Hayes
- Albert Henry
- Stan Wright

== Côte d'Ivoire/Ivory Coast ==
- Max Brito

== Czech Republic ==
- Martin Jágr

== Denmark ==
- Nico Vermaak

== Democratic Republic of the Congo ==
- Yannick Nyanga

== England ==
For the full list of English international rugby players see: List of England national rugby union players

== Fiji ==
For the full list of Fiji international rugby players see: List of Fiji national rugby union players

== France ==
For the full list of France international rugby players see: List of France national rugby union players

== Georgia ==
For the full list of Georgia international rugby players see: List of Georgia national rugby union players

== Germany ==
For the full list of Germany international rugby players see: List of Germany national rugby union players

== Greece ==
- Nicholas Alamanos

== Haiti ==
- Constantin Henriquez

== Hong Kong ==
For the full list of Hong Kong international rugby players see: List of Hong Kong national rugby union players

== India ==
- Rahul Bose
- Nasser Hussain (rugby union)
- Pendse

== Ireland ==
For the full list of Irish international rugby players see: List of Ireland national rugby union players

== Italy ==
For the full list of Italy international rugby players see: List of Italy national rugby union players

== Japan ==
- Takeomi Ito
- Takuro Miuchi
- Kyohei Morita
- Yukio Motoki
- Daisuke Ohata
- Hirotoki Onozawa
- Adam Parker
- Yuya Saito
- Ruatangi Vatuvei
- Ayumu Goromaru

== Kenya ==
- Biko Adema
- Peter Karia
- Innocent Simiyu

== Luxembourg ==
For the full list of Luxembourg international rugby players see: List of Luxembourg national rugby union players

== Morocco ==
- Abdelatif Benazzi
- Djalil Narjissi

== Namibia ==
- Tinus du Plessis
- Piet van Zyl
- Bratley Langenhoven
- Jacques Nieuwenhuis
- Percy Montgomery
- Rohan Kitshoff

== New Zealand ==
For the full list of New Zealand international rugby players see: List of New Zealand national rugby union players. Other New Zealand rugby union players include Daryl Halligan, Toni Konui and Albert Henry Baskerville.

== Nigeria ==
Owolabi Adele

- Victor Ubogu*
- Daniel Norton**
- Marcus Watson**
- Ugo Monye*
- Ayoola Erinle*
- Topsy Ojo*
- Joseph Mbu
- Mark Odejobi**
- Steve Ojomoh*
- Uche Oduoza*
- David Akinluyi
- Temitope Okenla
- Tiwaloluwa Obisesan
- James Doherty
- Nsa Harrison
- Ejike Uzoigbe
- Francis Ugwu
- Robert Worrincy
- William Sharp
- Kene Ejikeme
- Chukwuma Osazuwa
- Emmanuel Akinluyi
- James Davies
- Michael Worrincy
- Ade Adebisi
- Salim Abdulmailk
- Obi Wilson
- Nde Monye
- Aliyu Shelleng
- Nuhu Ibrahim
- Aristide Goualin
- Mark Olugbode
- Craig Olugbode
- Ovie Koloko
- Martin Olima

* denotes capped by England ** denotes capped by England 7s

== Niue ==
- Matt Faleuka
- Toni Pulu

== Papua New Guinea ==
- Will Genia
- Henari Veratau

== Portugal ==
- Duarte Cardoso Pinto
- José Pinto
- Vasco Uva

== Romania ==
For the full list of Romania international rugby players see: List of Romania national rugby union players.

== Russia ==
- Igor Galinovskiy
- Alexander Obolenski

== (Western) Samoa ==
- Frank Bunce
- Va'aiga Tuigamala ("Inga the Winger")
- Freddie Tuilagi
- Apollo Perelini
- Lome Fa'atau
- Pat Lam
- Trevor Leota
- Brian Lima
- Earl Va'a
- Alesana Tuilagi
- Ofisa Treviranus
- Census Johnston
- Mahonri Schwalger
- Kane Thompson
- Daniel Leo

== Scotland ==
See: List of Scottish rugby union players

== Singapore ==
- Billy King

== South Africa ==
For the full list of South African international rugby players see: List of South Africa national rugby union players

== Spain ==
- Francisco Puertas Soto (1963 - )
- Oriol Ripol (1975 - )

== Sri Lanka ==
- Mahesh Rodrigo

== Soviet Union ==
- B.P. Gavrilov
- I.I. Kiziriya
- Dimitri Mironov
- Alexandre Tichonov

== Tonga ==
For the full list of Tonga international rugby players see: List of Tonga national rugby union players

== Uganda ==
- Idi Amin

== United States of America ==
For the full list of USA international rugby players see: List of USA national rugby union players

== Uruguay ==
For the full list of Uruguay international rugby players see: List of Uruguay national rugby union players

== Venezuela ==
- Serge Blanco

== Wales ==
For the full list of Welsh international rugby players see: List of Wales national rugby union players

== Zambia ==
- George Gregan
- Corné Krige

== Zimbabwe ==
- Tonderai Chavhanga
- Takudzwa Ngwenya
- Tendai Mtawarira

== See also ==
- Lists of rugby union players
- International Rugby Hall of Fame
