= CIS Football (disambiguation) =

CIS Football is the former name of U Sports football, the highest level of amateur play of Canadian football.

CIS football can also refer to:

- CIS national football team, an association football team of the Football Federation of the Soviet Union in 1992.
- CIS (rugby), a rugby union side that played matches during 1991 and 1992.
- CIS Soccer, former name of U Sports Soccer.
