= Rugby union in Hungary =

- Country: Hungary
- Governing body: Hungarian Rugby Union
- National team: Hungary
- First played: 1960s
- Registered players: 2,100
- Clubs: 18

National competitions
- Rugby World Cup; Rugby World Cup Sevens; European Nations Cup

Rugby union in Hungary is a minor but growing sport.

The Hungarian Rugby Union (Hungarian: "Magyar Rögbi Szövetség") was founded in 1990, and affiliated to the IRB in 1991.

== History ==
As early as 1875 a group of British Embassy employees played rugby on the Szabadság tér (Freedom Square) in Budapest.

At the 1935 World University Games held in Budapest, rugby was also included in the program (won 12-10 by France against Germany). Reasons given for the hosts not participating were lack of time for preparation and a serious injury suffered by a player.

Italians have played a major part in the establishment of Hungarian rugby, namely the late Carlos Passalacqua and his friends from the Italian Embassy in Budapest. The game was originally introduced by a group of Italian diplomats in the 1960s and 70s. who founded a number of clubs. However, when they left, the game withered away in all but Budapest, where a small group of enthusiasts kept it going. Like neighbouring Austria and the Czech Republic, rugby has tended to be strongest in the national capital Budapest (which is by far the largest settlement in the country, containing 20% of the population) - however, in 1981, it would spread into the town of Kecskemét.

The former All Black scrum half Chris Laidlaw, writing at the end of the 1970s, saw rugby as a positive force in east-west relations at the time:

"Rugby has become the ping-pong of outdoor sports in its capacity to spread goodwill between East and West. Over the last 30 or 40 years it has spread through Eastern Europe, establishing itself strongly in Rumania and Yugoslavia, Hungary and into the USSR. The fact that a Russian team [sic] has finally played a full-scale, if unofficial Test match against France speaks for itself.

"Rugby tours between countries on either side of the Iron Curtain have generated considerable political interest among the governments concerned, and the results can be quite astonishing. The recent Rumanian tour of New Zealand, for instance, germinated other contacts between the two countries and was partly instrumental in the establishment of new trade agreements which otherwise might not have begun."

Chris Laidlaw writing of the open secret of shamateurism in Soviet sport said:

"So far as the East Europeans and the Russians are concerned, who knows where the incentives lie? In such societies rugby, like many other sports before it, is becoming an expression of national achievement and therefore the subject of careful nurturing. Yet, is the risk of the double standard, so evident in the athletic arena, permeating the East Europeans' approach to rugby so great as to justify the exclusion of the Communist world indefinitely from regular rugby competition?"

Hungary had its first international in 1990, shortly after the foundation of the national union. This was against East Germany, which they lost with a respectable scoreline of 3-7.

In the early 1990s, former Italian cap, Dr Giancarlo Tiziani was a major driving force in Austrian rugby. Before his death in 1994, he tried hard to establish a Central European equivalent of the Five Nations between Austria, Hungary, Croatia, Slovenia and Bosnia.

There are over two thousand registered players in the country.

On 6 October 2012 a new record was set for most spectators to watch a rugby match in the country with over 3000 people watching Hungary win against Bulgaria 28-23 in a Rugby World Cup 2015 qualifier.

== Notable players ==
Hungarian actor András Stohl played scrum-half for the now-defunct ELTE-BEAC in the 1980s. He was also involved with the MRgSz in some capacity in the first decade of the 2000s.

== Terminology ==
poszt száma	English name	Hungarian name
1.	Prop	pillér
2.	Hooker	sarkazó
3.	Prop	pillér
4.	Lock/Second row	második soros
5.	Lock/Second row	második soros
6.	Flanker	Leváló
7.	Flanker	Leváló
8.	No. 8	Összefogó

poszt száma	Angol kifejezés	Magyar megfelelő
9.	Scrum half	Nyitó
10.	Fly half	Irányító
11.	Wing	Szélső
12.	Centre	Centre
13.	Centre	Centre
14.	Wing	Szélső
15.	Full back	Fogó

== See also ==
- Hungary national rugby union team
