= Rugby union in Kyrgyzstan =

Rugby union in Kyrgyzstan is a minor but growing sport.

== History ==
=== Soviet Period ===
Rugby union was played in the Russian Empire as early as in 1908. In 1934 the Moscow Championship was started, and in 1936 the first Soviet Championship took place.

In 1949, rugby union was forbidden in the USSR during the "fight against the cosmopolitanism". The competitions were resumed in 1957, and the Soviet Championship in 1966. In 1975 the Soviet national team played their first match.

=== Post-independence ===
Kyrgyz rugby, like that of Uzbekistan is mainly confined to the military and universities, although there is a schools programme underway. Kazakhstan has been a major impetus for rugby growth in the region (Almaty had a team in the Soviet league, and they also have a formidable women's team), and has been a major factor in keeping the game going in its neighbouring countries. For years, most of Kyrgyzstan's games, formal, or informal were against Kazakhstan, or Kazakh teams.

The Union has formed a Rugby Academy in Bishkek, Kyrgyzstan, in order to improve the game, as well as forming a schools program. However, the government is reluctant to fund the sport, as it is not currently recognised by the Olympics.

Currently they take part in the Central Asian region of the Asian Five Nations.

== See also ==
- Kyrgyzstan national rugby union team
