= Rugby union in Uzbekistan =

Rugby union in Uzbekistan is a minor but growing sport.

== History ==
=== Soviet period ===
Rugby union was played in the Russian Empire as early as in 1908. In 1934 the Moscow Championship was started, and in 1936 the first Soviet Championship took place.

In 1949, rugby union was forbidden in the USSR during the "fight against the cosmopolitanism". The competitions were resumed in 1957, and the Soviet Championship in 1966. In 1975 the Soviet national team played their first match.

In 1962, rugby in Uzbekistan underwent a major expansion as four new teams were founded.

Uzbekistan had its own rugby team in the USSR, but it was not treated as a proper national side.

=== Post-independence ===
Uzbek rugby, like that of Kyrgyzstan is mainly confined to the military and universities, although there is a schools programme underway. Kazakhstan has been a major impetus for rugby growth in the region (Almaty had a team in the Soviet league, and they also have a formidable women's team), and has been a major factor in keeping the game going in its neighbouring countries. For years, most of Uzbekistan's games, formal, or informal were against Kazakhstan, or Kazakh domestic sides.

Currently they take part in the Central Asian region of the Asian Five Nations.

== See also ==
- Uzbekistan national rugby union team

== Bibliography ==
- Louis, Victor & Jennifer Sport in the Soviet Union. Oxford Pergamon, 1980. ISBN 0-08-024506-4.
