= List of international rugby union tries by Jonah Lomu =

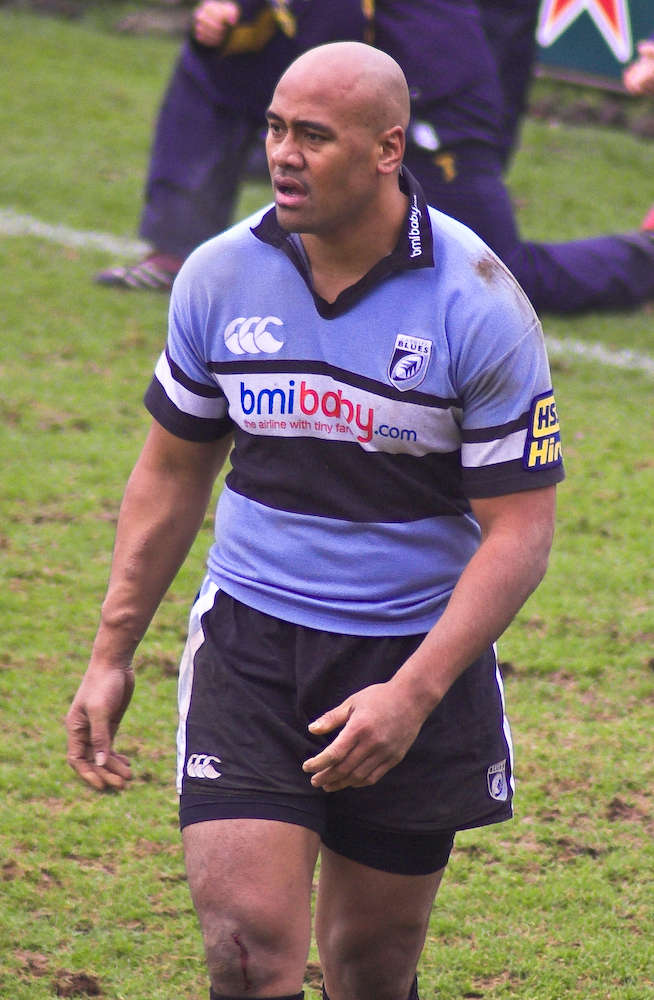
Jonah Lomu playing for the Cardiff Blues in 2006

Jonah Lomu was an international rugby union winger who played for New Zealand between 1994 and 2002. He scored a total of 37 tries in 63 international appearances, which makes him the sixth highest try scorer for New Zealand and the eighteenth highest on the all-time list. Lomu held alone the record for the most tries scored in the Rugby World Cup (15 in 11 matches at the 1995 and 1999 tournaments), until South Africa's Bryan Habana equalled his tally at the 2015 tournament.

Lomu made his debut for New Zealand in June 1994 against France. He scored his first international try in his third appearance, scoring twice against Ireland in New Zealand's opening game of the 1995 Rugby World Cup. This was followed with a try against Scotland in the quarter-finals and four tries against England in the semi-finals—the most Lomu would score in a single match. He was, however, unable to score a try in the final, as South Africa beat New Zealand to win the trophy. Lomu played 13 times against South Africa during his career, but failed to score a try against them. The only other "Tier 1" national team against which Lomu did not score a try was Wales. Lomu finished 1995 with 12 international tries, his highest tally in a single year.

After two tries in 1996, including one in the inaugural Tri Nations Series, Lomu was unable to score in three appearances during 1997. At the 1999 Rugby World Cup, he scored in each of New Zealand's group stage matches against Tonga, England and Italy. He followed this with a try against Scotland in the quarter-finals and two tries in the semi-finals, as New Zealand lost to France. Lomu's tally of eight tries in this tournament is a World Cup record, although it has since been equalled by Habana in the 2007 tournament and Lomu's countryman Julian Savea in the 2015 tournament.

Lomu scored four tries in 2000, including a hat-trick against Scotland at Carisbrook and a try against Australia in the Tri Nations. This was followed by five tries in 2001, once again with a try against Australia in the Tri Nations. Lomu's final international tries came in November 2002, when he scored twice against England at Twickenham. Two weeks later, he made his last international appearance against Wales at the Millennium Stadium. Lomu retired from professional rugby in 2007 due to a chronic kidney disorder. After suffering a heart attack on 18 November 2015 that was associated with his kidney condition, Lomu died at the age of 40.

== International tries ==
In the Score column, New Zealand's score is given first.

International tries scored by Jonah Lomu
Try	Date	Opposing team	Score	Competition	Venue	Location	Ref.
1	27 May 1995	Ireland	43–19	Rugby World Cup	Ellis Park	Johannesburg	
2	27 May 1995	Ireland	43–19	Rugby World Cup	Ellis Park	Johannesburg	
3	11 June 1995	Scotland	48–30	Rugby World Cup	Loftus Versfeld	Pretoria	
4	18 June 1995	England	45–29	Rugby World Cup	Newlands	Cape Town	
5	18 June 1995	England	45–29	Rugby World Cup	Newlands	Cape Town	
6	18 June 1995	England	45–29	Rugby World Cup	Newlands	Cape Town	
7	18 June 1995	England	45–29	Rugby World Cup	Newlands	Cape Town	
8	22 July 1995	Australia	28–16	Bledisloe Cup	Eden Park	Auckland	
9	29 July 1995	Australia	34–23	Bledisloe Cup	Sydney Football Stadium	Sydney	
10	28 October 1995	Italy	70–6	Test match	Stadio Renato Dall'Ara	Bologna	
11	28 October 1995	Italy	70–6	Test match	Stadio Renato Dall'Ara	Bologna	
12	18 November 1995	France	37–12	Test match	Parc des Princes	Paris	
13	15 June 1996	Scotland	62–31	Test match	Carisbrook	Dunedin	
14	6 July 1996	Australia	43–6	Tri Nations	Athletic Park	Wellington	
15	20 June 1998	England	64–22	Test match	Carisbrook	Dunedin	
16	1 August 1998	Australia	23–27	Tri Nations	Lancaster Park	Christchurch	
17	18 June 1999	Samoa	71–13	Test match	North Harbour Stadium	North Shore City	
18	3 October 1999	Tonga	45–9	Rugby World Cup	Ashton Gate	Bristol	
19	3 October 1999	Tonga	45–9	Rugby World Cup	Ashton Gate	Bristol	
20	9 October 1999	England	30–16	Rugby World Cup	Twickenham	London	
21	14 October 1999	Italy	101–3	Rugby World Cup	Galpharm Stadium	Huddersfield	
22	14 October 1999	Italy	101–3	Rugby World Cup	Galpharm Stadium	Huddersfield	
23	24 October 1999	Scotland	30–18	Rugby World Cup	Murrayfield	Edinburgh	
24	31 October 1999	France	31–43	Rugby World Cup	Twickenham	London	
25	31 October 1999	France	31–43	Rugby World Cup	Twickenham	London	
26	24 June 2000	Scotland	69–20	Test match	Carisbrook	Dunedin	
27	24 June 2000	Scotland	69–20	Test match	Carisbrook	Dunedin	
28	24 June 2000	Scotland	69–20	Test match	Carisbrook	Dunedin	
29	15 July 2000	Australia	39–35	Tri Nations	Stadium Australia	Sydney	
30	30 June 2001	France	37–12	Dave Gallaher Trophy	WestpacTrust Stadium	Wellington	
31	11 August 2001	Australia	15–23	Tri Nations	Carisbrook	Dunedin	
32	17 November 2001	Ireland	40–29	Test match	Lansdowne Road	Dublin	
33	24 November 2001	Scotland	37–6	Test match	Murrayfield	Edinburgh	
34	1 December 2001	Argentina	24–20	Test match	El Monumental	Buenos Aires	
35	8 June 2002	Italy	64–10	Test match	Waikato Stadium	Hamilton	
36	9 November 2002	England	28–31	Test match	Twickenham	London	
37	9 November 2002	England	28–31	Test match	Twickenham	London	
