= Drop goal =

Method of scoring points in rugby league and rugby union

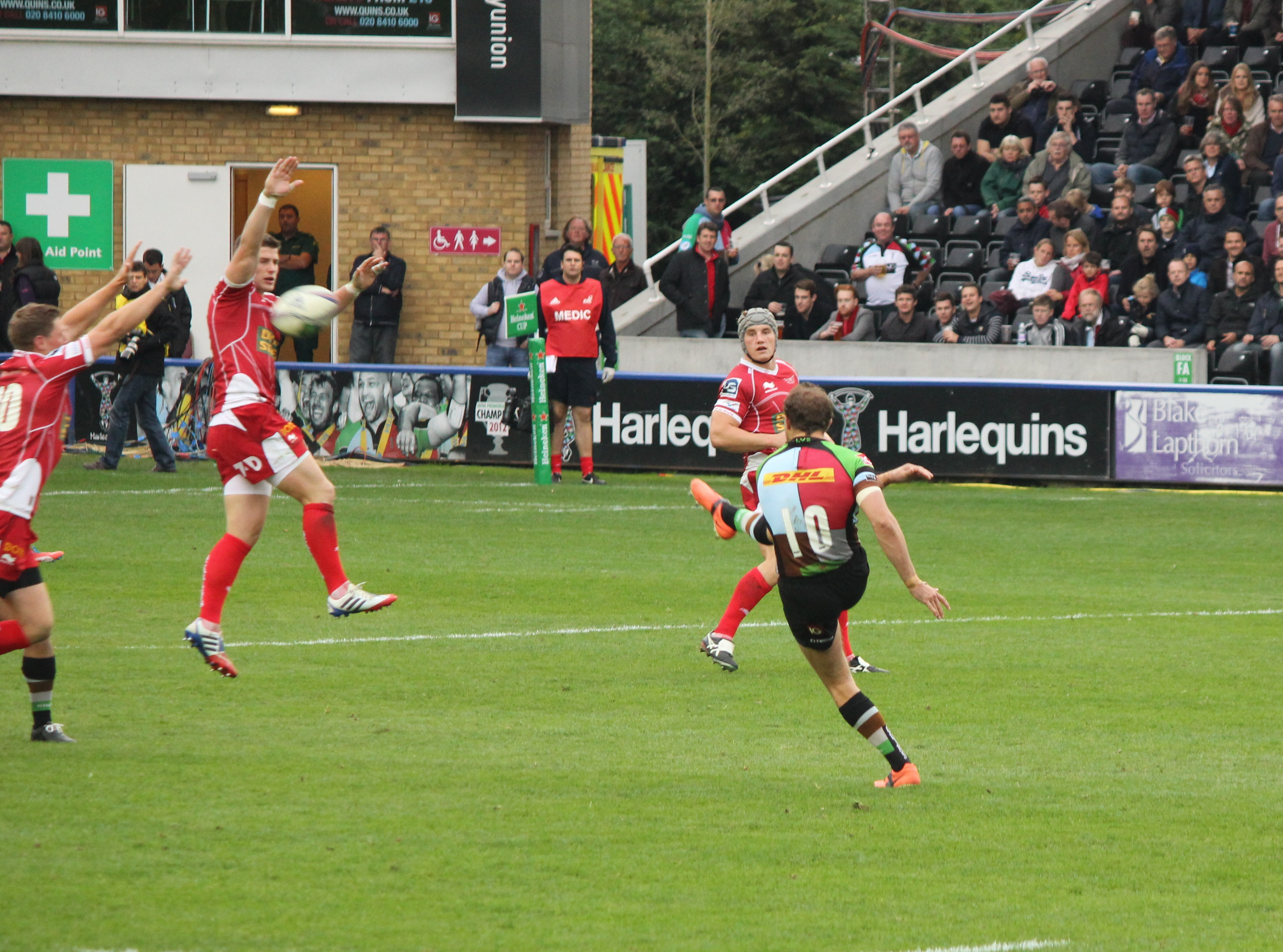
Nick Evans (10) kicking a drop goal in a rugby union match for Harlequin F.C.

A drop goal, field goal, or dropped goal is a method of scoring points in rugby union and rugby league and also, rarely, in American football and Canadian football. A drop goal is scored by drop kicking the ball (dropping the ball and then kicking it as it rises from the first bounce) over the crossbar and between the posts of the goal posts. After the kick, the ball must not touch the ground before it goes over and through, although it may touch the crossbar, the uprights or an opponent. A drop goal in rugby union is worth three points, and in rugby league a drop goal is usually worth one point (see below).

If the drop goal attempt is successful, play stops and the non-scoring team (the scoring team in rugby union sevens) restarts play with a kick from halfway. If the kick is unsuccessful, play continues and the offside rules for a kick apply. Defenders may tackle the kicker while he is in possession of the ball, or attempt to charge down or block the kick.

== Rugby union ==
World Rugby, the international governing body of rugby union, refers to this method of scoring in its publications as a "dropped goal", but this is commonly abbreviated to "drop goal".

=== Points value ===
A drop goal is worth three points, and before 1948 it was worth four points. From time to time suggestions have been made by some rugby commentators to reduce the value of drop goals, or to limit or discourage them in other ways.

=== Field goal ===
It is sometimes also referred to as a field goal in modern usage. A field goal was an older form of scoring where the goal was kicked from a ball that was in play but on the ground, not drop kicked. It was outlawed in 1906.

== Rugby league ==
In rugby league the drop goal is worth one or two points. Because of this the drop goal's use is largely in the late stages of a match in order to break a deadlock, or to extend a lead to more than a converted try.

With the introduction of the golden point rule in the Australasian National Rugby League (where the term field goal is usually used), it is often the first choice option when looking to secure a win.

In the NSWRL prior to 1970, field goals were worth two points, but with the introduction of limited tackle football in 1967, their usage greatly increased as a scoring method. In 1968, 194 field goals were kicked, and by the end of 1970 it was decided to reduce their value to one point. This, and the increase to six tackle sets, saw just 17 kicked in 1971.

On 11 December 2020, the NRL announced the introduction of a two-point field goal for kicks taken from more than 40 metres out. Adam Reynolds kicked the first such field goal on 8 April 2021.

== In other football codes ==
The drop-kick field goal is a rare but still legal part of American football and Canadian football, other football codes descended from rugby football. In both sports, it can be used to score a field goal (three points) or a conversion (one point). While both rugby balls and the American and Canadian football shape are prolate spheroids, the American and Canadian footballs gradually changed to become more elongated and pointed, a shape much more difficult to drop kick. As of 2019, the last successful drop kick in a professional American football game was when Doug Flutie drop kicked for an extra point in the New England Patriots' regular-season finale against the Miami Dolphins on 1 January 2006; prior to that, the last successful drop kick in a regular-season game was in 1941. Flutie's kick was in the last game of his career, and he did not usually kick the ball at all (dropped or otherwise) as he played quarterback. The maneuver is still occasionally encountered in arena football, where the drop goal is worth four points instead of the standard three for a placekicked field goal.

In Australian rules football, a drop kick is a legal way of scoring a goal or a behind, but is rarely executed these days, as punting a goal is also legal and much easier to execute.

== See also ==
- List of leading rugby union drop goal scorers

== Sources ==
- McCarthy, Winston (1968). Haka! The All Blacks Story. London: Pelham Books.
