= Christian Cullen =

New Zealand rugby union player

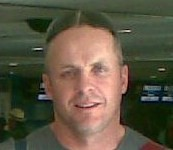
- Cullen in 2010
- Born: Christian Mathias Cullen; 12 February 1976 (age 50) Paraparaumu, New Zealand
- Height: 1.80 m (5 ft 11 in)
- Weight: 85 kg (13 st 5 lb; 187 lb)
- School: Kāpiti College
- Notable relative: Brian Steele (great-uncle)

Rugby union career
- Position(s): Fullback, Wing, Centre
Senior career
Years	Team	Apps	(Points)
1994	Horowhenua-Kapiti	8	(48)
1995–1996	Manawatu	15	(80)
1996–2003	Hurricanes	85	(308)
1997	Central Vikings	9	(35)
1998–2003	Wellington	39	(93)
2003–2007	Munster	44	(75)
International career
Years	Team	Apps	(Points)
1995	New Zealand U21	6	(38)
1996–2003	New Zealand	60	(266)
1996–1998	New Zealand Barbarians	4	(20)
2000–2004	Barbarian F.C.	3	(10)
National sevens team
Years	Team		Comps
1995–1996	New Zealand		5
Medal record
Men's rugby sevens
Representing New Zealand
Commonwealth Games
Gold medal – first place	1998 Kuala Lumpur	Team competition

Christian Mathias Cullen (born 12 February 1976) is a retired New Zealand rugby union player. He played most of his rugby at fullback for New Zealand (the All Blacks), for the Hurricanes in the Super 12, and for Manawatu, Wellington and later Munster at provincial level. He was nicknamed the Paekakariki Express and was considered to be one of the most potent running fullbacks rugby has ever seen. With 46 tries scored in 58 tests, Cullen is the equal-11th-highest try-scorer in international rugby.

== Youth and early career ==
Cullen was born in Paraparaumu and grew up in Paekākāriki, a small town north of Wellington. He is the youngest of three children. He has an elder twin brother named Shane and a sister named Anita. Cullen is of Irish descent; he also has Samoan, Māori and German ancestry.

His rugby talent emerged in his high school years and he was selected in the New Zealand secondary schools team in 1993 and 1994. He played senior rugby for Manawatu in 1995 and scored 70 points through 12 tries, two conversions and two penalty goals. He was selected to the New Zealand sevens squad for tournaments in Fiji and Hong Kong and shortly afterwards he made his All Blacks debut.

== Professional career ==
Cullen's provincial career started in 1994 season for Horowhenua-Kapiti. In 1996 he played in the first-ever Super 12 game, as full back contested by the Wellington Hurricanes and the Auckland Blues. This game was played on March 1st 1996 and was won 38-26 by the Blues. In total, Cullen played 8 seasons of super rugby for the Wellington Hurricanes from the start of the 1996 season to the end of the 2003 season.

That year of 1996, his debut season he scored seven tries in nine matches for the Hurricanes.

At the 1996 World Sevens competition Cullen Hong Kong he scored 18 tries, including seven in one match. On the back of an outstanding performance at the Hong Kong Sevens, later that year in June, Cullen was selected as an All Black. He scored seven tries in his first two Test matches: a hat-trick on debut against Samoa on June 7th, 1996 and four tries against Scotland. He sustained a knee cartilage injury on the All Blacks' tour to South Africa.

In 1997 Cullen returned from injury and scored 11 tries in 10 games for the Hurricanes, and 12 tries in 12 Test matches for the All Blacks.

The All Blacks had a poor year in 1998 with five consecutive losses, but Cullen scored four tries in seven matches. He represented New Zealand in rugby sevens at the Kuala Lumpur Commonwealth Games, playing seven games, scoring nine tries and kicking 23 conversions. New Zealand won the tournament and the gold medal.

In 1999 Cullen was a member of New Zealand's unsuccessful Rugby World Cup squad. He played six matches in the Cup tournament, starting five at centre which was not his preferred position. In 2000 he scored 10 tries in 11 games for the Hurricanes and seven tries in four Tri Nations Tests, including three consecutive pairs.

In 2001 Cullen sustained a severe knee injury that required surgery and an intensive recovery programme. He made himself unavailable for the All Blacks' 2001 end-of-year tour, but was announced 'dropped' by coach John Mitchell at a NZRU press conference. Cullen and Mitchell's personal differences went unresolved over time. Cullen was selected to and dropped from the All Blacks squad throughout 2002. He scored four tries in the five Test matches that year.

In the 2003 Super season Cullen scored eight tries in 12 games for the Hurricanes, taking his Super Rugby career tally to 56, a record at the time. He was briefly and controversially selected for the Māori rugby team, despite having, according to his father, about 1/64th Māori ancestry.

Controversially, he was left out of New Zealand's 2003 World Cup squad, by New Zealand All Blacks coach John Mitchell with whom he had a strained relationship. Cullen played out the NPC season for Wellington, despite Wellington's losing to Auckland by a score of 29-41 in the final match. It was Cullen's last first-class match in New Zealand before he joins Irish club Munster and he scored 2 tries in the game. He left the field because of a shoulder injury in the 74th minute and he received a standing ovation as he left the field.He told an interviewer in 2024 that the standing ovation was pretty cool.

== Later career and retirement ==
At the end of 2003 Cullen moved to Ireland, after he was dropped by John Mitchell, for the All Blacks. In Ireland, he played for Munster. He has told interviewers that he only left New Zealand because he was dropped from the All Blacks. His time with Munster was blighted by injuries, particularly to his shoulder, limiting his appearances. His last match for Munster was a 15–7 Celtic League win over the Newport Gwent Dragons at Musgrave Park on 28 April 2007. Two weeks later, on 12 May, he announced his retirement from rugby and stated his intention of returning to New Zealand to start a business.

== Records ==
Cullen is the All Blacks' second-highest try-scorer in the Tri Nations Series with 16, second only to Richie McCaw. He was the first player to score a try in every Tri Nations test in one season. He is New Zealand's second most-capped test fullback. At the time of his retirement he was the All Blacks' leading try-scorer with 46;. That record has since been overtaken by Doug Howlett. He scored over 150 tries while playing in New Zealand. He is the third-highest try-scorer in Super Rugby with 56 tries, behind Joe Roff and Howlett.

== Biography ==
His biography, Christian Cullen: Life on the Run (by John Matheson) was released in October 2003. The book received attention particularly for Cullen's criticism of John Mitchell.

== See also ==
- List of international rugby union tries by Christian Cullen
