= Rugby union in Romania =

- Romania versus Ireland at Lansdowne Road Stadium, Dublin in 2005.
- Country: Romania
- Governing body: Federația Română de Rugby
- National team: Romania
- Nickname: Stejarii (The Oaks)
- First played: ca. 1900
- Registered players: 9,810
- Clubs: 113

National competitions
- Rugby World Cup; Rugby Europe International Championships; Rugby World Cup Sevens

Club competitions
- CEC Bank SuperLiga; Cupa României; Heineken Cup; Continental Club Rugby League

Audience records
- Single match: ca. 95.000 (19.05.1957) Romania vs. France (15-16)
- Season: CEC Bank SuperLiga

Rugby union is a moderately popular team sport played in Romania with a tradition of more than 100 years. In past eras, the game had been more popular and Romanian national teams had been relatively highly ranked in world rugby, but their standing declined since the dawn of professionalism and the end of communism. The Romanian men's national team are currently 21st in the World Rugby Rankings as of 6 August 2025.

== History ==
=== Early history ===
The game was introduced to Romania from France at the turn of the 20th century by students returning with rugby balls from their studies in Paris. Romanian rugby took root in Bucharest, established by students who had been to French universities, and by the capital's burgeoning middle class. Stadiul Român and seventeen other teams would be formed in Bucharest from 1913 onwards. The Romanian Rugby Championship was first contested in 1914. Romania played France for the first time in 1924.

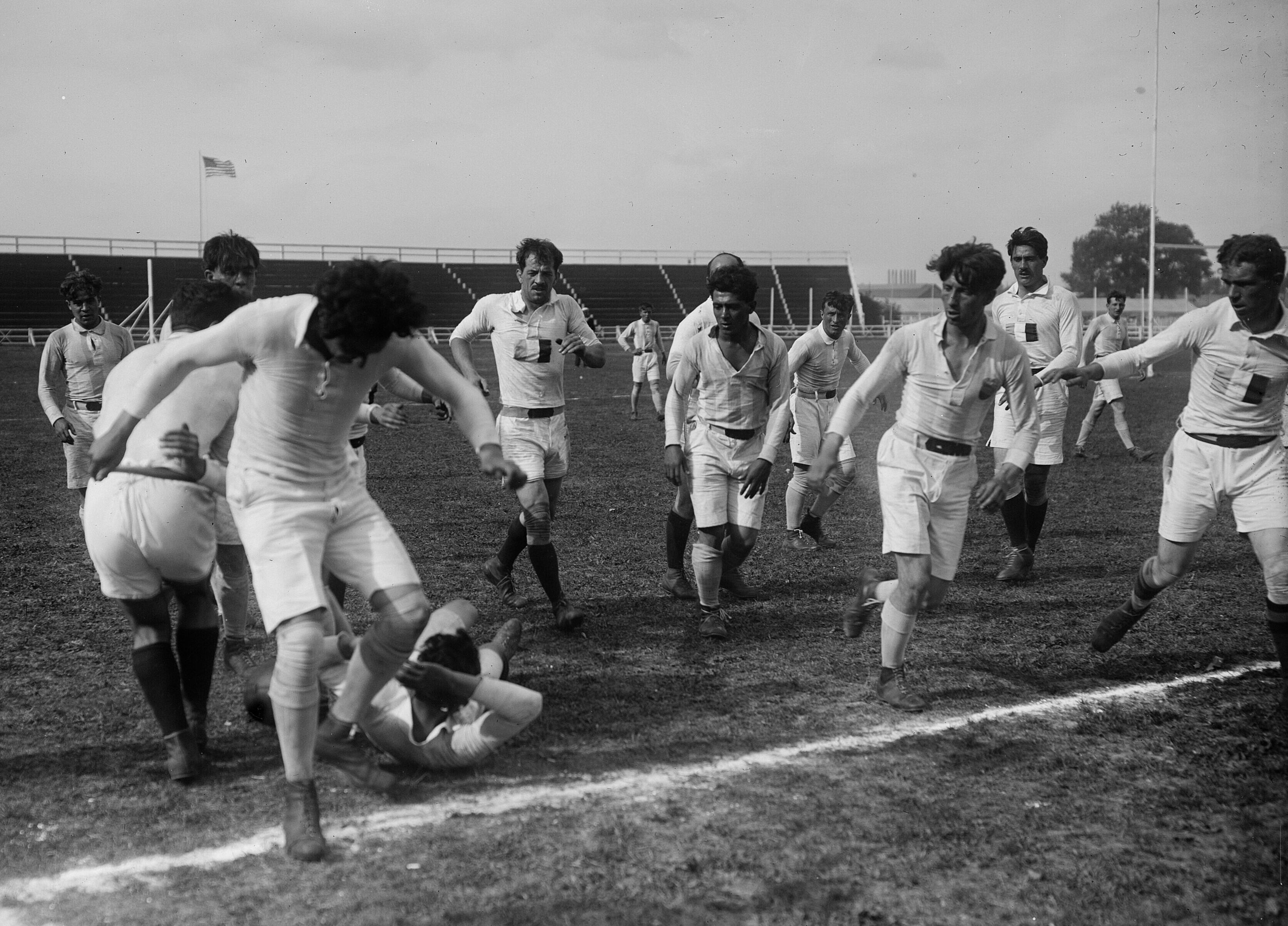
Romania versus France at the Inter-Allied Games of 1919

The nation's first international was played against the USA in 1919, six years after the game was first introduced. In 1931, a governing body was formed, the Federaţia Română de Rugby.

The first team outside Bucharest was formed at an aircraft factory in Braşov in 1939.

=== Communist period ===
For the first half of the 20th century, Romanian rugby was fairly isolated, having most of its contact with France, and (to an extent) the Iron Curtain in the second half did not help either. However, this "isolation" was broken when Rowe Harding took the Welsh team Swansea touring there to play national champions Locomotiva. On his return to the UK, Harding spoke highly of the Romanian game, speaking of its consistently high standard as well as of the passion of both the fans and the players, which he thought was unparalleled in Europe outside the Five Nations. The tour and Harding's praise effectively opened up Romanian rugby to the rest of western Europe, sparking a number of tours travelling to and from the country. In 1955, a Romanian side toured England and Wales, playing Swansea, Cardiff, Bristol and the Harlequins, winning one, drawing two, and losing one. Later in 1955, the Romanians defeated Llanelli in Moscow, and then beat both Cardiff and Harlequins in Bucharest. Only France, who played Romania in front of almost 95,000 fans in Bucharest (in a preliminary match to a soccer international), could beat the Romanians, and that was only after an epic 16-15 battle.

A generation of French school-trained coaches from the late 1940s and 1950s laid the foundations for national success in the 1960s, 70s and 80s. In 1974, Romania won against France 15 – 10 in Bucharest, during the FIRA – Association of European Rugby championship. In 1975, Romania went on an 8-game tour to New Zealand, which concluded in Wellington with a 10-10 draw against the Junior All Blacks. Home nation sides began to award international caps for matches against Romania in 1981. Romania won rugby internationals over Scotland in 1984 and 1991, and also over Wales in 1983 and 1988 (the latter in Cardiff). Between 1960 and 1990, Romania beat France eight times, the most famous being in 1990 when the legendary French-based no. 8 Hari Dumitras led Romania to a 12-6 victory in Auch, France. Canadian second row Norm Hadley believed the 1991 Rugby World Cup game against Romania was more physically sapping than playing either France or New Zealand.

The former All Blacks scrum half Chris Laidlaw, writing at the end of the 1970s, saw rugby as a positive force in East-West relations at the time:

"Rugby has become the ping-pong of outdoor sports in its capacity to spread goodwill between East and West. Over the last 30 or 40 years it has spread through Eastern Europe, establishing itself strongly in Rumania and Yugoslavia, Hungary and into the USSR. The fact that a Russian team [sic] has finally played a full-scale, if unofficial Test match against France speaks for itself."

"Rugby tours between countries on either side of the Iron Curtain have generated considerable political interest among the governments concerned, and the results can be quite astonishing. The recent Rumanian tour of New Zealand, for instance, germinated other contacts between the two countries and was partly instrumental in the establishment of new trade agreements which otherwise might not have begun."

Chris Laidlaw writing of the open secret of shamateurism in Soviet sport said:

"So far as the East Europeans and the Russians are concerned, who knows where the incentives lie? In such societies rugby, like many other sports before it, is becoming an expression of national achievement and therefore the subject of careful nurturing. Yet, is the risk of the double standard, so evident in the athletic arena, permeating the East Europeans' approach to rugby so great as to justify the exclusion of the Communist world indefinitely from regular rugby competition?"

"Much to everyone's surprise, Eastern Bloc countries are among the game's vigorous participants, seemingly oblivious to rugby's capitalist class-ridden origins. Russia emerged from behind the Iron Curtain and came under international scrutiny when they played France in Toulouse in November 1978. Romania, Poland and Czechoslovakia are members of the Federation Internationale de Rugby Amateur, the governing body for those countries not in the IB."

=== Post-communism ===
After the fall of communism in 1989, Romanian rugby union suffered a dramatic financial shortfall. In 1995, the first ever Heineken Cup match took place in Romania with Toulouse taking on Farul Constanţa.

Romania first got regular international competition when they joined the newly formed European Nations Cup in 2000. As an indication of the decline in standard of the sport in Romania, the national team was defeated 134-0 by England in 2001 and Dinamo Bucharest lost 151-0 to Saracens in the European Rugby Shield.

București Rugby was formed to represent Romania in European club competitions in 2004. In recent years, they have achieved respectable results, including a win in 2010 against an Italian Super 10 side.

== Governing body ==
Rugby union in Romania is administered by the Romanian Rugby Federation (FRR), which was founded on 1 December 1912 as Federațiunea Societăților de Sport din România (FSSR).

== National team ==
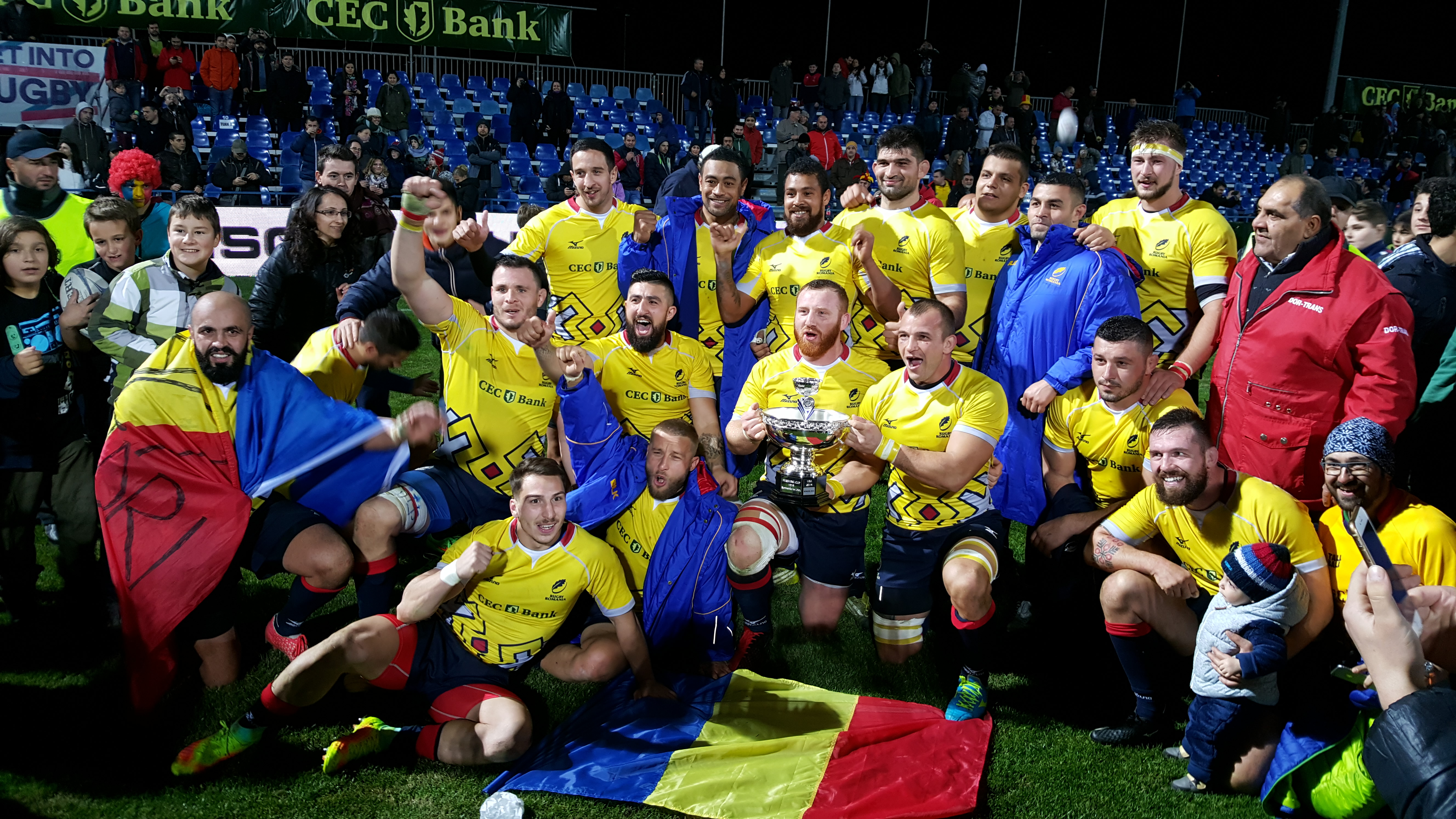
Romania national rugby union team after receiving the Pershing Trophy in 2016 at their home ground, Stadionul Arcul de Triumf after a test match against USA

The Romania national rugby union team, nicknamed The Oaks, has long been considered one of the stronger European teams outside the Six Nations tournament. It often takes part in the Rugby World Cup, which is hosted every four years.

Romania plays every year in the Rugby Europe Championship, a competition for second and third-tier European nations and have won the competition on three occasions (under the current format) in the 2000, 2001–2002 and 2005–2006 seasons.

The Antim Cup is contested between Romania and Georgia. The cup is contested each time Georgia and Romania meet in a senior international match other than World Cup matches. Romania has won the cup on six occasions in 2002, 2003, 2004, 2006, 2010 and in 2017.

Romania has played at every World Cup so far (except for the 2019 tournament in Japan, as it was disqualified) and won at least one game at each World Cup (except for the 1995 and 2011 tournaments, where they lost all of their games).

== Domestic competition ==
The Liga Națională de Rugby, which has been contested since 2010 in its current format, is the main domestic competition in Romania. It has been contested by many teams across the country since 1914. During the communist period in Romania, the competition had been dominated by Steaua București and Dinamo București; in recent years, the competition has been dominated by Știința Baia Mare and Rugby Timișoara.

== Domestic cup ==
The Cupa României, which has been contested since 1914, is the main domestic cup in Romania that has also been contested by many teams across Romania along with the Liga Națională de Rugby. Like the domestic competition, the Cupa României had been dominated by Steaua București and Dinamo București; recently, however, the cup has been dominated by Știința Baia Mare and Rugby Timișoara. At present, only teams in the Liga Națională de Rugby can compete in the Cupa României since the gap between those teams and the ones in the Divizia Națională de Seniori, Romania's second-tier domestic championship, is ever-increasing.

== European club tournaments ==
In 1995, the first ever Heineken Cup match took place in Romania when Toulouse took on RCJ Farul Constanța. Since the inaugural season, Romanian teams have not taken part in the Heineken Cup.

Instead of playing in the Heineken Cup, Romanian teams had qualified and took part in the European Challenge Cup nearly every single season since its inception apart from the 2000−01, 2003−04 seasons and 2004−05 seasons, where the Bucharest Wolves took part in the competition as an alternative to the team that would win the Liga Națională de Rugby.

The Bucharest Wolves was a team that was formed by the FRR as an alternative to the team that would win the Liga Națională de Rugby to play in European competitions (due to the decreasing levels of competitiveness from the Romanian teams in the Challenge Cup) and would consist of rugby union players playing in the domestic Romanian championship. They played in the European Shield in 2004−05 and have played in every single Challenge Cup between 2005 and 2014, when the team was ultimately dissolved in favour for the champions of Romania to represent Romania in European competitions instead.

== Popularity ==
In the 1980s, the country reached its peak in the sport as the national team managed to defeat teams such as Wales, Scotland and France, who all played in the Five Nations Championship.

Not only that, the national team would become more and more popular among Romanians and as a result, the country had more than 12,000 players playing rugby and 110 rugby clubs.

Yet, after the fall of communism, Romanian rugby union suffered a drastic financial shortfall. However, its popularity – which has never been comparable with that of football or handball – has not been diminished.

According to World Rugby, Romania has 113 rugby union clubs and approximately 25,000 rugby players, 9,810 of which are registered players (most of these players are male and only a small fraction of these players are female).

== See also ==
- Romania national rugby union team
- List of Romania national rugby union players
- Romania national under-20 rugby union team
- Romania national rugby sevens team
- Romania women's national rugby sevens team
- Liga Națională de Rugby
- Cupa României
- Romanian Wolves
- Sport in Romania

== Bibliography ==
- Bath, Richard (ed.) The Complete Book of Rugby (Seven Oaks Ltd, 1997 ISBN 1-86200-013-1)
- Richards, Huw A Game for Hooligans: The History of Rugby Union (Mainstream Publishing, Edinburgh, 2007, ISBN 978-1-84596-255-5)

=== Further reading ===
- Barbu, Aurel, Stama, Tiberiu, File din istoria rugbiului românesc, Editura Consiliului Național pentru Educație Fizică și Sport, București, 1969.
- Manoileanu, Dumitru, Rugby: Mică enciclopedie, Editura Sport-Turism, București, 1982
- Moldoveanu, Traian Rugby: istorie românească: povestită de un griviţean, Vol. I, Editura Scripta, București, 2016, ISBN 978-973-8238-56-5)
