= Pendse =

Pendse is a surname. People with the name include:

- Neha Pendse
- Shripad Narayan Pendse
- Chintamani Govind Pendse
- Lalji Moreshwar Pendse
- Shankar Damodar Pendse
