= Rugby union in Tajikistan =

Rugby union in Tajikistan is a minor but growing sport.

== Governing body ==
In 2012, Hotam Fayzulloh and others founded the Tajik Rugby Union.

== History ==
=== Soviet Period ===
Rugby union was played in the Russian Empire as early as in 1908. In 1934 the Moscow Championship was started, and in 1936 the first Soviet Championship took place.

In 1949, rugby union was forbidden in the USSR during the "fight against the cosmopolitanism". The competitions were resumed in 1957, and the Soviet Championship in 1966. In 1975 the Soviet national team played their first match.

In 1962, rugby in Tajikistan underwent a major expansion as four new teams were founded.

Tajikistan had its own rugby team in the USSR, but it was not treated as a proper national side.

== Today ==
With the founding of the Tajik Rugby Union in 2012, the prerequisites for the creation of Rugby teams (both male and female) in Tajikistan were set. With the help of NZ filmmaker Faramarz Beheshsti and others, first youth and a female team started training in and around Dushanbe.

== See also ==
- Tajikistan national rugby union team
