= Rugby union in Turkmenistan =

Rugby union in Turkmenistan is a minor but growing sport.

== Governing body ==
The national body is not yet affiliated to the Asian Rugby Football Union or the International Rugby Board.

== History ==
=== Soviet Period ===
Rugby union was played in the Russian Empire as early as in 1908. In 1934 the Moscow Championship was started, and in 1936 the first Soviet Championship took place.

In 1949, rugby union was forbidden in the USSR during the "fight against the cosmopolitanism". The competitions were resumed in 1957, and the Soviet Championship in 1966. In 1975 the Soviet national team played their first match.

Turkmenistan had its own rugby team in the USSR, but it was not treated as a proper national side.

=== Post-independence ===
Rugby in Turkmenistan has received help from Kazakhstan, which is the rugby "power" in Central Asia. There is now a Turkmenistan national rugby union team, but it is very much embryonic, and its matches have tended to be semi-formal.
