= List of international rugby union tries by Christian Cullen =

Christian Cullen is a New Zealand rugby union player who represented the New Zealand national rugby union team either as a fullback or a wing at international level from 1996 to 2002. He represented New Zealand in 58 test matches and scored 46 tries for his country. (Note: Cullen played for New Zealand 60 times overall.) Cullen's try total places him ninth on the all-time list and he is the second highest try scorer for New Zealand behind Doug Howlett (49). He holds the record for the highest number of international tries scored in the fullback playing position in history.

Cullen made his international debut for New Zealand in a 51–10 victory over Samoa at McLean Park in Napier on 7 June 1996, scoring his first three international tries in the same match. He went on to score a further four tries in a 62–31 win against Scotland the following week. Cullen went on to score more tries in the Tri Nations Series in 1996, 1997, 1998, 1999 and 2000 and New Zealand's tour of Britain and Ireland in 1997. His final three tries came in a test match on 29 June 2002 with Fiji at Westpac Stadium in Wellington, where he overtook Jeff Wilson's total of 44 to become the player with the highest number of tries scored for New Zealand. Cullen remained New Zealand's leading try-scorer until Howlett overtook Cullen's total in September 2007.

Of Cullen's 46 international tries, 27 were scored in test matches, 16 in the Tri Nations Series and 3 in New Zealand's 1997 tour of Britain and Ireland. He scored more against South Africa more than any other team, with ten tries, followed by Australia whom he scored eight tries against. Cullen scored multiple tries in a single international match on 13 occasions, including four hat-tricks. The first of these was a three-try effort against Samoa on his 1996 international debut. The second hat-trick was against Scotland in his second international game held the following week. The third was against Wales in New Zealand's 1997 Britain and Ireland tour and the last was over Fiji in a 2002 test match. Cullen scored tries against 11 countries, including eight of the eleven "Tier 1" countries and three "Tier 2" nations.

== Key ==
- Won denotes that the match was won by New Zealand.
- Lost denotes that the match was lost by New Zealand.
- Draw denotes that the match was drawn.

== International tries ==
Scores and results list New Zealand's tally first.

International rugby union tries by Christian Cullen
Try	Opponent	Venue	Competition	Date	Result	Score	Refs.
1	Samoa	McLean Park, Napier	Test match	7 June 1996	Won	51–10	
2	Samoa	McLean Park, Napier	Test match	7 June 1996	Won	51–10	
3	Samoa	McLean Park, Napier	Test match	7 June 1996	Won	51–10	
4	Scotland	Carisbrook, Dunedin	Test match	15 June 1996	Won	62–31	
5	Scotland	Carisbrook, Dunedin	Test match	15 June 1996	Won	62–31	
6	Scotland	Carisbrook, Dunedin	Test match	15 June 1996	Won	62–31	
7	Scotland	Carisbrook, Dunedin	Test match	15 June 1996	Won	62–31	
8	Australia	Athletic Park, Wellington	1996 Tri Nations Series	6 July 1996	Won	43–6	
9	South Africa	ABSA Stadium, Durban	Test match	17 August 1996	Won	23–19	
10	Fiji	North Harbour Stadium, North Shore City	Test match	14 June 1997	Won	71–5	
11	Fiji	North Harbour Stadium, North Shore City	Test match	14 June 1997	Won	71–5	
12	Argentina	Athletic Park, Wellington	Test match	21 June 1997	Won	93–8	
13	Argentina	Athletic Park, Wellington	Test match	21 June 1997	Won	93–8	
14	Argentina	Rugby Park, Hamilton	Test match	28 June 1997	Won	62–10	
15	Australia	Melbourne Cricket Ground, Melbourne	1997 Tri Nations Series	26 July 1997	Won	33–18	
16	South Africa	Eden Park, Auckland	1997 Tri Nations Series	9 August 1997	Won	55–35	
17	South Africa	Eden Park, Auckland	1997 Tri Nations Series	9 August 1997	Won	55–35	
18	Australia	Carisbrook, Dunedin	1997 Tri Nations Series	16 August 1997	Won	36–24	
19	Wales	Wembley Stadium, London	1997 New Zealand tour of Britain and Ireland	29 November 1997	Won	42–7	
20	Wales	Wembley Stadium, London	1997 New Zealand tour of Britain and Ireland	29 November 1997	Won	42–7	
21	Wales	Wembley Stadium, London	1997 New Zealand tour of Britain and Ireland	29 November 1997	Won	42–7	
22	England	Carisbrook, Dunedin	Test match	20 June 1998	Won	64–22	
23	England	Carisbrook, Dunedin	Test match	20 June 1998	Won	64–22	
24	Australia	Lancaster Park, Christchurch	1998 Tri Nations Series	1 August 1998	Lost	23–27	
25	Australia	Sydney Football Stadium, Sydney	Test match	29 August 1998	Lost	14–19	
26	France	Athletic Park, Wellington	Test match	26 June 1999	Won	54–7	
27	France	Athletic Park, Wellington	Test match	26 June 1999	Won	54–7	
28	South Africa	Carisbrook, Dunedin	1999 Tri Nations Series	10 July 1999	Won	28–0	
29	South Africa	Loftus Versfeld Stadium, Pretoria	1999 Tri Nations Series	7 August 1999	Won	34–18	
30	South Africa	Loftus Versfeld Stadium, Pretoria	1999 Tri Nations Series	7 August 1999	Won	34–18	
31	Italy	Alfred McAlpine Stadium, Huddersfield	Test match	14 October 1999	Won	101–3	
32	Tonga	North Harbour Stadium, North Shore City	Test match	16 June 2000	Won	102–0	
33	Scotland	Carisbrook, Dunedin	Test match	24 June 2000	Won	69–20	
34	Scotland	Eden Park, Auckland	Test match	1 July 2000	Won	48–14	
35	Australia	Stadium Australia. Sydney	2000 Tri Nations Series	15 July 2000	Won	39–35	
36	South Africa	Jade Stadium, Christchurch	2000 Tri Nations Series	22 July 2000	Won	25–12	
37	South Africa	Jade Stadium, Christchurch	2000 Tri Nations Series	22 July 2000	Won	25–12	
38	Australia	Westpac Stadium, Wellington	2000 Tri Nations Series	5 August 2000	Lost	23–24	
39	Australia	Westpac Stadium, Wellington	2000 Tri Nations Series	5 August 2000	Lost	23–24	
40	South Africa	Ellis Park Stadium, Johannesburg	2000 Tri Nations Series	19 August 2000	Lost	40–46	
41	South Africa	Ellis Park Stadium, Johannesburg	2000 Tri Nations Series	19 August 2000	Lost	40–46	
42	France	Stade de France, Paris	Test match	11 November 2000	Won	39–26	
43	Italy	Waikato Stadium, Hamilton	Test match	8 June 2002	Won	64–10	
44	Fiji	Westpac Stadium, Wellington	Test match	29 June 2002	Won	68–18	
45	Fiji	Westpac Stadium, Wellington	Test match	29 June 2002	Won	68–18	
46	Fiji	Westpac Stadium, Wellington	Test match	29 June 2002	Won	68–18	

== Hat-tricks ==
International hat-tricks by Christian Cullen
No.	Opponent	Venue	Competition	Date	Result	Score	Ref(s)
1	Samoa	McLean Park, Napier	Test match	7 June 1996	Won	51–10	
2	Scotland	Carisbrook, Dunedin	Test match	15 June 1996	Won	62–31	
3	Wales	Wembley Stadium, London	1997 New Zealand tour of Britain and Ireland	29 November 1997	Won	42–7	
4	Fiji	Westpac Stadium, Wellington	Test match	29 June 2002	Won	68–18	

== Statistics ==
Caps and tries by year
Year	Caps	Tries
1996	10	9
1997	12	12
1998	7	4
1999	12	6
2000	10	11
2001	1	0
2002	6	4
Total	58	46

Tries by competition
Competition	Tries
Test match	27
Tri Nations Series	16
Tour	3
Total	46

Tries by opponent
Opponent	Tries
South Africa	10
Australia	8
Scotland	6
Fiji	5
Argentina	3
France	3
Samoa	3
Wales	3
England	2
Italy	2
Tonga	1
