= List of leading international rugby union drop goal scorers =

This is a list of the leading drop goal scorers in rugby union test matches, with a minimum of ten test drop goals. Test caps are awarded by a player's national union, regardless of whether the opposition recognise it as such. Note, however, that if one nation grants a match test status and the opponents do not then only the statistics for the nation granting test status are counted in test totals. Composite teams made up of players selected from multiple unions—for example the British and Irish Lions and Pacific Islanders—are also considered test teams because they are selected by a group of recognised national governing bodies.

Only teams for which a player has scored a test drop goal are included in the table; players may have played for other test sides. Table including matches played 21 November 2026:

== List ==
Players who are still active at international level are in bold.

Rank	Drop goals	Player	International team	Caps	Years	Ref
1	36	Jonny Wilkinson	England	97	1998 – 2011	
2	28	Hugo Porta	Argentina (26); South American Jaguars (2)	66	1971 – 1990	
3	23	Rob Andrew	England (21); British and Irish Lions (2)	76	1985 – 1997	
4	20	Diego Dominguez	Italy	76	1989 – 2003	
5	18	Naas Botha	South Africa	28	1980 – 1992	
6	17	Stefano Bettarello	Italy	55	1979 – 1988	
6	17	Dan Parks	Scotland	67	2004 – 2012	
8	15	Jean-Patrick Lescarboura	France	28	1982 – 1990	
8	15	Ronan O'Gara	Ireland	130	2000 – 2013	
10	13	Jonathan Davies	Wales	32	1985 – 1997	
11	12	Pierre Albaladejo	France	30	1954 – 1964	
11	12	John Rutherford	Scotland	44	1979 – 1987	
11	12	Nicolás Sánchez	Argentina	104	2010 – 2023	
14	11	Lisandro Arbizu	Argentina	86	1990 – 2005	
14	11	Didier Camberabero	France	36	1982 – 1993	
14	11	Guy Camberabero	France	14	1961 – 1968	
17	10	Craig Chalmers	Scotland (9); British and Irish Lions (1)	61	1989 – 1999	
17	10	**George Ford**	England	109	2014 -	
17	10	Neil Jenkins	Wales	91	1991 – 2002	
17	10	Barry John	Wales (8); British and Irish Lions (2)	30	1966 – 1972	
17	10	Andrew Mehrtens	New Zealand	70	1995 – 2004	
17	10	Neculai Nichitean	Romania	28	1990 – 1997	
17	10	Bobby Ross	Canada	58	1989 – 2003	
17	10	Morne Steyn	South Africa	68	2009 – 2021	
Sources other than those already cited: .

== See also ==
- List of leading rugby union test try scorers
- List of leading rugby union test point scorers
- List of rugby union test caps leaders
- International rugby union player records
