= List of Hungary national rugby union players =

List of Hungary national rugby union players is a list of people who have played for the Hungary national rugby union team. The list only includes players who have played in a Test match.

Note that the "position" column lists the position at which the player made his Test debut, not necessarily the position for which he is best known. A position in parentheses indicates that the player debuted as a substitute.

Hungary's International Rugby Capped Players
Number	Name	Position	Date first cap obtained	Opposition
	Imre Horváth		1990	
	László Kump		1990	
	Roland Kollarszky		1990	
	Karoly Niklasz		1990	
	Andras Fabinyi		1990	
	Akos Harmat		1993	
	József Herczeg		1993	
	Mihály Muskovics		1993	
	Zoltán Németh		1993	
	Zsolt Vasas		1993	
	Miklós Dobai		1996	
	Krisztián Herédi		1996	
	Tamás Tatay		1996	
	György Tóth		1996	
	Mihály Hoffman		1997	
	László Rajner		1997	
	István Schützenhoffer		1997	
	Dénes Simon		1997	
	Kornél Ardelán	fullback	2002-10-05	v Latvia at Riga
	Zoltán Heckel	prop	2002-10-05	v Latvia at Riga
	Szabolcs Hegedűs	wing	2002-10-05	v Latvia at Riga
	István Hock	hooker	2002-10-05	v Latvia at Riga
	Géza Kendi	centre	2002-10-05	v Latvia at Riga
	Balázs Kiss	flanker	2002-10-05	v Latvia at Riga
	Zoltán Koller	no. 8	2002-10-05	v Latvia at Riga
	Sándor Lakatos	prop	2002-10-05	v Latvia at Riga
	Viktor Madarász	lock	2002-10-05	v Latvia at Riga
	Tamás Marosi	lock	2002-10-05	v Latvia at Riga
	Tibor Pásztor	scrum-half	2002-10-05	v Latvia at Riga
	Zsolt Simon	wing	2002-10-05	v Latvia at Riga
	Gábor Stiglmayer	fly-half	2002-10-05	v Latvia at Riga
	Károly Suiogan	centre	2002-10-05	v Latvia at Riga
	László Szöllösi	flanker	2002-10-05	v Latvia at Riga
	Gábor Biró	(replacement)	2002-10-05	v Latvia at Riga
	Tamás Molnár	(replacement)	2002-10-05	v Latvia at Riga
	Tamás Pfeiffer	(scrum-half)	2002-10-05	v Latvia at Riga
	Róbert Deli	flanker	2003-10-11	v Moldova at Esztergom
	György Ivánfi	fly-half	2003-10-11	v Moldova at Esztergom
	Tamás Ódor	centre	2003-10-11	v Moldova at Esztergom
	István Tóth	prop	2003-10-11	v Moldova at Esztergom
	Balázs Vinkó	lock	2003-10-11	v Moldova at Esztergom
	Zsolt Beliczai	(flanker)	2003-10-11	v Moldova at Esztergom
	Balázs Böhm	(centre)	2003-10-11	v Moldova at Esztergom
	István Juhász	(replacement)	2003-10-11	v Moldova at Esztergom
	Péter Novák	(lock)	2003-10-11	v Moldova at Esztergom
	Mathew Holzl	fullback	2005-09-24	v Bosnia and Herzegovina at Esztergom
	Zsolt Jéga-Szabó	flanker	2005-09-24	v Bosnia and Herzegovina at Esztergom
	Janós Molnár	wing	2005-09-24	v Bosnia and Herzegovina at Esztergom
	Norbert Csapó	(no. 8)	2005-09-24	v Bosnia and Herzegovina at Esztergom
	Szabolcs Nagy	(centre)	2005-09-24	v Bosnia and Herzegovina at Esztergom
	Janos Varga	(flanker)	2005-09-24	v Bosnia and Herzegovina at Esztergom
	Pál Turi	centre	2006-04-22	v Bulgaria at Sofia
	András Brinyiczki	(centre)	2006-04-22	v Bulgaria at Sofia
	Gergely Kramlik	(wing)	2006-04-22	v Bulgaria at Sofia
	Bálint Péter	(replacement)	2006-04-29	v Armenia at Esztergom
	Roland Nagy	(prop)	2006-05-27	v Lithuania at Esztergom
	Attila Baksza	(centre)	2006-10-07	v Norway at Stavanger
	Richárd Tóth	(flanker)	2006-10-07	v Norway at Stavanger
	Szabolcs Nagyhegyesi	fullback	2006-10-28	v Bulgaria at Kecskemét
	Zsolt Tátrai	prop	2007-04-21	v Austria at Dunaújváros
	Zoltán Máthé	(flanker)	2007-04-21	v Austria at Dunaújváros
	Tamás Balogh	lock	2007-10-27	v Norway at Székesfehérvár
	Ádám Belencsák	(replacement)	2007-10-27	v Norway at Székesfehérvár
	Jozsef Surman	(wing)	2007-10-27	v Norway at Székesfehérvár
	Benjamin Mészáros	centre	2008-09-13	v Slovenia at Ljubljana
	Zsolt Nagy	flanker	2008-09-13	v Slovenia at Ljubljana
	Richárd Sinkovics	hooker	2008-09-13	v Slovenia at Ljubljana
	Imre Baranyi	(replacement)	2008-09-13	v Slovenia at Ljubljana
	Gergő Haspel	(flanker)	2008-09-13	v Slovenia at Ljubljana
	Dániel Pluhár	(replacement)	2008-09-13	v Slovenia at Ljubljana
	István Tolnai	(wing)	2008-09-13	v Slovenia at Ljubljana
	András Gódor	wing	2008-09-27	v Norway at Oslo
	Peter Zsitvai	fly-half	2008-09-27	v Norway at Oslo
	Tamás Becsei	(centre)	2008-09-27	v Norway at Oslo
	Zoltán Pongrácz	(flanker)	2008-09-27	v Norway at Oslo
	Péter Szabados	(prop)	2009-04-18	v Austria at Esztergom
	Róbert Baranyi	(replacement)	2009-10-10	v Slovenia at Pécs
	Mihály Gondos	centre	2010-05-01	v Norway at Esztergom
	István Köbli	(centre)	2010-05-15	v Austria at Vienna
