= List of leading rugby union test point scorers =

This is a list of the leading male scorers in rugby union test matches.

Players currently active at international level are listed in bold; those not playing at international level but still active at club level are listed in italics.

== Top 25 scoring international players (Tier 1) ==
Updated: 21 November 2026

World rank	Tier rank	Points	Player	Position	International team(s)	Years active	Caps	Tries	Con	Pen	DG	Avg. pts (per game)	Ref
1	1	1598	Dan Carter	Fly-half	New Zealand	2003–2015	112	29	293	281	8	14.27	
2	2	1271	Owen Farrell	Fly-half; centre	England (1237); British and Irish Lions (34)	2012–2025	120	10	201	268	5	10.59	
3	3	1246	Jonny Wilkinson	Fly-half	England (1179); British and Irish Lions (67)	1998–2011	97	7	169	255	36	12.85	
4	4	1113	Johnny Sexton	Fly-half	Ireland (1108); British and Irish Lions (5)	2009–2023	124	19	182	214	4	8.98	
5	5	1090	Neil Jenkins	Fly-half	Wales (1049); British and Irish Lions (41)	1990–2003	87	11	131	248	10	12.53	
6	6	1083	Ronan O'Gara	Fly-half	Ireland (1083); British and Irish Lions (0)	2000–2013	130	16	176	202	15	8.33	
8	7	1010	Diego Dominguez	Fly-half	Italy (983); Argentina (27)	1991–2003; 1989	76	9	133	213	20	13.29	
9	8	970	Stephen Jones	Fly-half	Wales (917); British and Irish Lions (53)	1998–2011	110	7	160	198	7	8.82	
10	9	967	Andrew Mehrtens	Fly-half	New Zealand	1995–2004	70	7	169	186	12	13.81	
11	10	911	Michael Lynagh	Fly-half	Australia	1984–1995	72	17	140	177	9	12.65	
12	11	902	Nicolas Sanchez	Fly-half	Argentina	2010–2023	104	15	130	177	12	8.67	
13	12	893	Percy Montgomery	Fullback	South Africa	1997–2008	102	25	153	148	6	8.75	
14	13	878	Matt Burke	Fullback	Australia	1993–2004	81	29	104	174	1	10.84	
15	14	860	**Beauden Barrett**	Fly-half; fullback	New Zealand	2012–	150	51	199	66	3	5.73	
16	15	850	Leigh Halfpenny	Fullback	Wales (801); British and Irish Lions (49)	2008–2023	105	15	86	201	0	8.1	
17	16	844	**Handré Pollard**	Fly-half	South Africa	2014–	88	8	132	175	5	9.59	
19	17	809	Chris Paterson	Fullback	Scotland	1999–2011	109	22	90	170	3	7.42	
21	18	742	Morné Steyn	Fly-half	South Africa	2009–2021	68	8	102	156	10	10.91	
22	19	736	Gavin Hastings	Fullback	Scotland (667); British and Irish Lions (69)	1986–1995	68	18	87	161	0	10.82	
23	20	714	Greig Laidlaw	Scrum-half	Scotland	2010–2019	76	5	106	159	0	9.39	
25	21	698	Matt Giteau	Centre	Australia	2002–2016	103	30	106	108	4	6.78	
26	22	673	Bernard Foley	Fly-half	Australia	2013–2022	76	16	133	107	1	8.82	
28	23	656	Dan Biggar	Fly-half	Wales (633); British and Irish Lions (23)	2008-2023	115	8	104	127	9	5.7	
28	23	656	Hugo Porta	Fly-half	Argentina (590); South American Jaguars (66)	1971–1990	66	12	91	115	28	9.94	
30	25	651	Felipe Contepomi	Fly-half	Argentina	1998–2013	85	16	74	139	2	7.66	

== Top ten scoring international players (Tier 2) ==
There are eight 'Tier 2' countries: Canada, Fiji, Japan, Georgia, Romania, Samoa, Tonga and the USA.

Updated: 17 October 2026

World rank	Tier rank	Points	Player	International team(s)	Years active	Caps	Tries	Con	Pe	DG	Avg. pts (per game)	Source(s)
7	1	1030	Florin Vlaicu	Romania	2006–2022	129	14	173	203	4	7.98	
18	2	840	Merab Kvirikashvili	Georgia	2003–2018	115	17	148	150	3	7.3	
24	3	711	Ayumu Goromaru	Japan	2005–2015	57	18	162	99	0	12.47	
27	4	670	Nicky Little	Fiji	1996–2011	71	2	117	140	2	9.44	
32	5	607	James Pritchard	Canada	2003–2015	62	18	104	103	0	9.79	
35	6	491	Gareth Rees	Canada	1986–1999	55	7	51	110	9	8.93	
39	7	465	Mike Hercus	United States	2002–2009	48	9	90	76	4	9.69	
42	8	422	Keiji Hirose	Japan	1994–2005	40	5	77	79	2	10.55	
43	9	419	Bobby Ross	Canada	1989–2003	58	7	51	84	10	7.22	
47	10	389	Dănuț Dumbravă	Romania	2002–2015	73	3	73	74	2	5.33	

== Top five scoring international players (Tier 3) ==
Updated: 16 August 2025

World rank	Tier rank	Points	Player	International team(s)	Years active	Caps	Tries	Con	Pen	DG	Avg. pts (per game)	Source(s)
20	1	797	Yuri Kushnarev	Russia	2005–2021	120	11	155	142	2	6.64	
41	2	430	Theuns Kotzé	Namibia	2011–2017	40	6	110	55	5	10.75	
48	3	381	Felipe Berchesi	Uruguay	2011–2023	49	3	57	83	1	7.78	
59	4	337	Raynor Parkinson	Germany	2011–2024	43	6	89	41	2	7.84	
60	5	335	Jaco Coetzee	Namibia	1990–1996	28	6	81	45	3	11.96	

== See also ==
- List of leading rugby union test try scorers
- List of leading international rugby union drop goal scorers
- List of rugby union test caps leaders
- International rugby union player records
