= Chintamani Govind Pendse =

Indian actor and singer

- Born: 28 August 1906; Sangli, Maharashtra
- Died: 1991 (aged 84–85)
- Other names: Mama Pendse

Chintamani Govind Pendse (28 August 1906 – 1991), also known as Mama Pendse, was a well known Marathi film and stage actor and singer.

He was awarded Sangeet Natak Akademi Award in 1981, given by the Sangeet Natak Akademi, India's National Academy of Music, Dance & Drama.
