= List of rugby union test caps leaders =

Male rugby players with the most test appearances

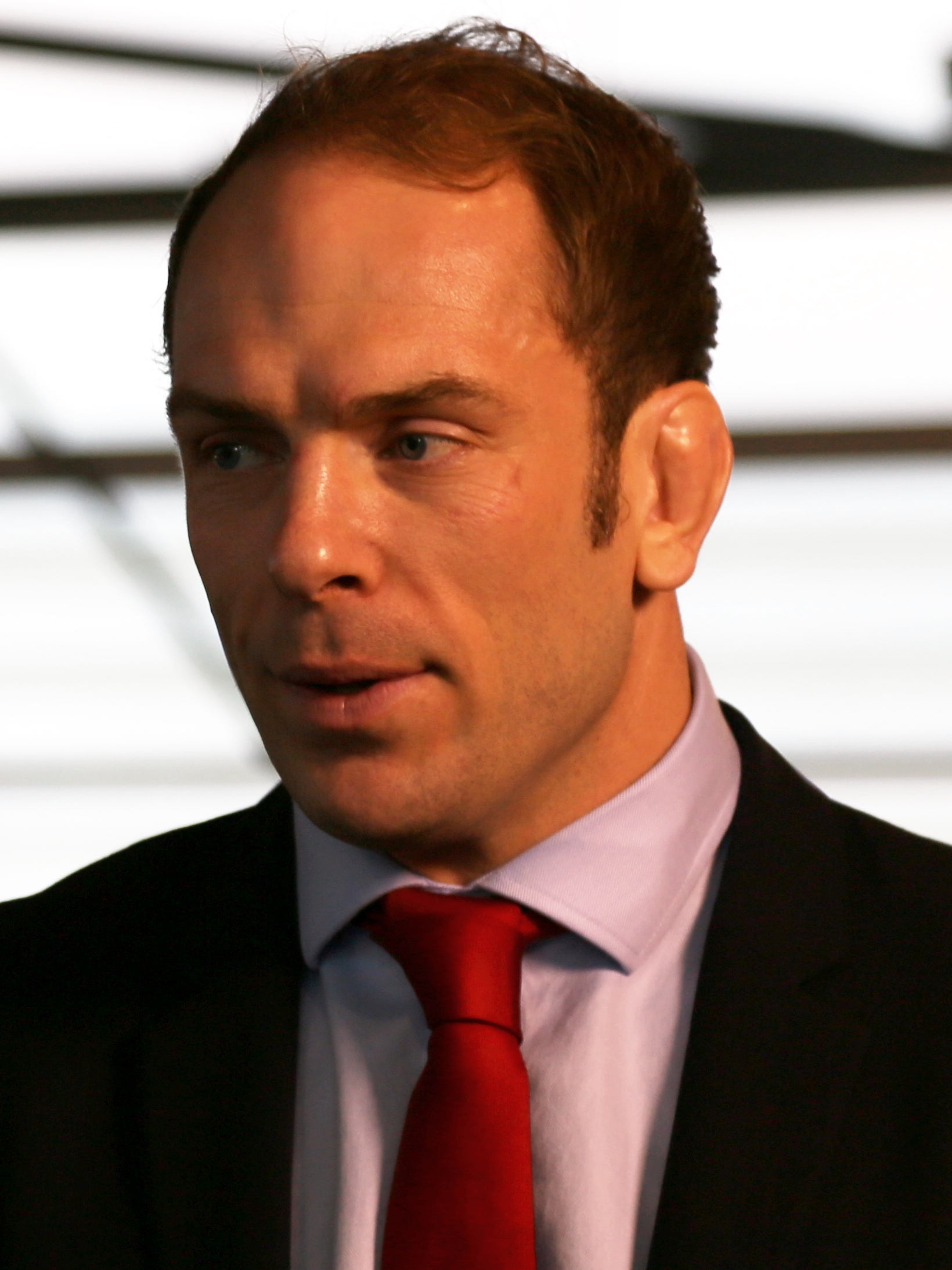
Alun Wyn Jones of Wales has the most international appearances for any male rugby player.

This is a list of the players who have made the most appearances in men's rugby union test matches, listing the players with 110 or more caps.

The British and Irish Lions and Pacific Islanders are recognised as test teams, although they represent a group of national unions. Some national teams have granted test caps for some matches against teams such as the Barbarians, an invitational club team; these are included only if the union granted test caps for a particular match.

== List ==
As of 21 November 2026

**Bold**	Player is still active at international level.
Italics	Player is still active at club level but has either retired from international rugby or has not been selected for their national team over a year.
	Player has the record number of caps for their national team.

Rank	Caps	Player	International team	First/latest appearance	Primary position	Ref(s)
1	170	Alun Wyn Jones	Wales (158); British and Irish Lions (12)	2006–2023	Lock	
2	154	James Slipper	Australia	2010–2026	Prop	
3	153	Sam Whitelock	New Zealand	2010–2023	Lock	
4	150	**Beauden Barrett**	New Zealand	2012–present	Fly-half / Fullback	
5	148	**Eben Etzebeth**	South Africa	2012–present	Lock	
5	148	Richie McCaw	New Zealand	2001–2015	Flanker	
7	142	Sergio Parisse	Italy	2002–2019	Number 8	
8	141	Brian O'Driscoll	Ireland (133); British and Irish Lions (8)	1999–2014	Centre	
9	139	George Gregan	Australia	1994–2007	Scrum-half	
10	137	Cian Healy	Ireland	2009–2025	Prop	
11	134	Gethin Jenkins	Wales (129); British and Irish Lions (5)	2002–2018	Prop	
12	133	Conor Murray	Ireland (125); British and Irish Lions (8)	2011–2025	Scrum-half	
13	132	Keven Mealamu	New Zealand	2002–2015	Hooker	
14	130	**Pablo Matera**	Argentina	2013–present	Flanker	
14	130	Ronan O'Gara	Ireland (128); British and Irish Lions (2)	2000–2013	Fly-half	
16	129	Stephen Moore	Australia	2005–2017	Hooker	
16	129	Florin Vlaicu	Romania	2006–2022	Centre	
16	129	Ben Youngs	England (127); British and Irish Lions (2)	2010–2023	Scrum-half	
19	127	Victor Matfield	South Africa	2001–2015	Lock	
19	127	Kieran Read	New Zealand	2008–2019	Number 8	
21	125	Michael Hooper	Australia	2012–2023	Flanker	
21	125	Aaron Smith	New Zealand	2012–2023	Scrum-half	
23	124	Rory Best	Ireland	2005–2019	Hooker	
23	124	Bryan Habana	South Africa	2004–2016	Wing	
23	124	George North	Wales (121); British and Irish Lions (3)	2010–2024	Wing	
23	124	Johnny Sexton	Ireland (118); British and Irish Lions (6)	2009–2023	Fly-half	
27	122	Davit Kacharava	Georgia	2006–2020	Centre	
27	122	**Julian Montoya**	Argentina	2014–present	Hooker	
27	122	Alexander Todua	Georgia	2008–2025	Wing	
30	121	Adam Ashley-Cooper	Australia	2005–2019	Centre / Wing	
30	121	Dan Cole	England (118); British and Irish Lions (3)	2010–2024	Prop	
32	120	Owen Farrell	England (112); British and Irish Lions (8)	2012–2025	Fly-half	
32	120	Yuri Kushnarev	Russia	2005–2021	Fly-half / Fullback	
34	119	Martin Castrogiovanni	Italy	2002–2016	Prop	
34	119	Jason Leonard	England (114); British and Irish Lions (5)	1990–2004	Prop	
34	119	Alessandro Zanni	Italy	2005–2020	Flanker	
37	118	**Jamie George**	England (115); British and Irish Lions (3)	2015-present	Hooker	
37	118	Fabien Pelous	France	1995–2007	Lock	
37	118	Tony Woodcock	New Zealand	2002–2015	Prop	
40	117	Tendai Mtawarira	South Africa	2008–2019	Prop	
41	116	Nathan Sharpe	Australia	2002–2012	Lock	
41	116	**Codie Taylor**	New Zealand	2015-	Hooker	
43	115	Dan Biggar	Wales (112); British and Irish Lions (3)	2008–2023	Fly-half	
43	115	Merab Kvirikashvili	Georgia	2003–2018	Fullback	
43	115	Paul O'Connell	Ireland (108); British and Irish Lions (7)	2002–2015	Lock	
43	115	Peter O'Mahony	Ireland (114); British and Irish Lions (1)	2012–2025	Flanker	
47	114	**Taulupe Faletau**	Wales (109); British and Irish Lions (5)	2011–present	Number 8	
47	114	**Maro Itoje**	England (105); British and Irish Lions (9)	2016-present	Lock	
49	112	Marco Bortolami	Italy	2001–2015	Lock	
49	112	Dan Carter	New Zealand	2003–2015	Fly-half	
49	112	**Ardie Savea**	New Zealand	2016-	Flanker	
52	111	Ross Ford	Scotland (110); British and Irish Lions (1)	2004–2017	Hooker	
52	111	Philippe Sella (Note: Primarily active during rugby's amateur era, before the IRB declared the game "open" to professionalism on 26 August 1995.)	France	1982–1995	Centre	
52	111	John Smit	South Africa	2000–2011	Hooker	
52	111	George Smith	Australia	2000–2013	Flanker	
56	110	Agustin Creevy	Argentina	2005–2024	Hooker	
56	110	Will Genia	Australia	2009–2019	Scrum-half	
56	110	Stephen Jones	Wales (104); British and Irish Lions (6)	1998–2011	Fly-half	
56	110	Sekope Kepu	Australia	2008–2019	Prop	
56	110	**Siya Kolisi**	South Africa	2013-	Flanker	
56	110	Courtney Lawes	England (105); British and Irish Lions (5)	2009–2023	Lock	
56	110	**Vasil Lobzhanidze**	Georgia	2015–	Scrum-half	

== See also ==
- List of leading rugby union test try scorers
- List of leading rugby union test point scorers
- List of leading international rugby union drop goal scorers
- International rugby union player records
