= U Sports Soccer =

U Sports soccer may refer to one of the following Canadian university soccer competitions:

- U Sports men's soccer
- U Sports women's soccer

== See also ==
- U Sports men's soccer championship
- U Sports women's soccer championship
