= List of leading rugby union test try scorers =

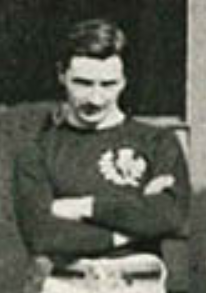
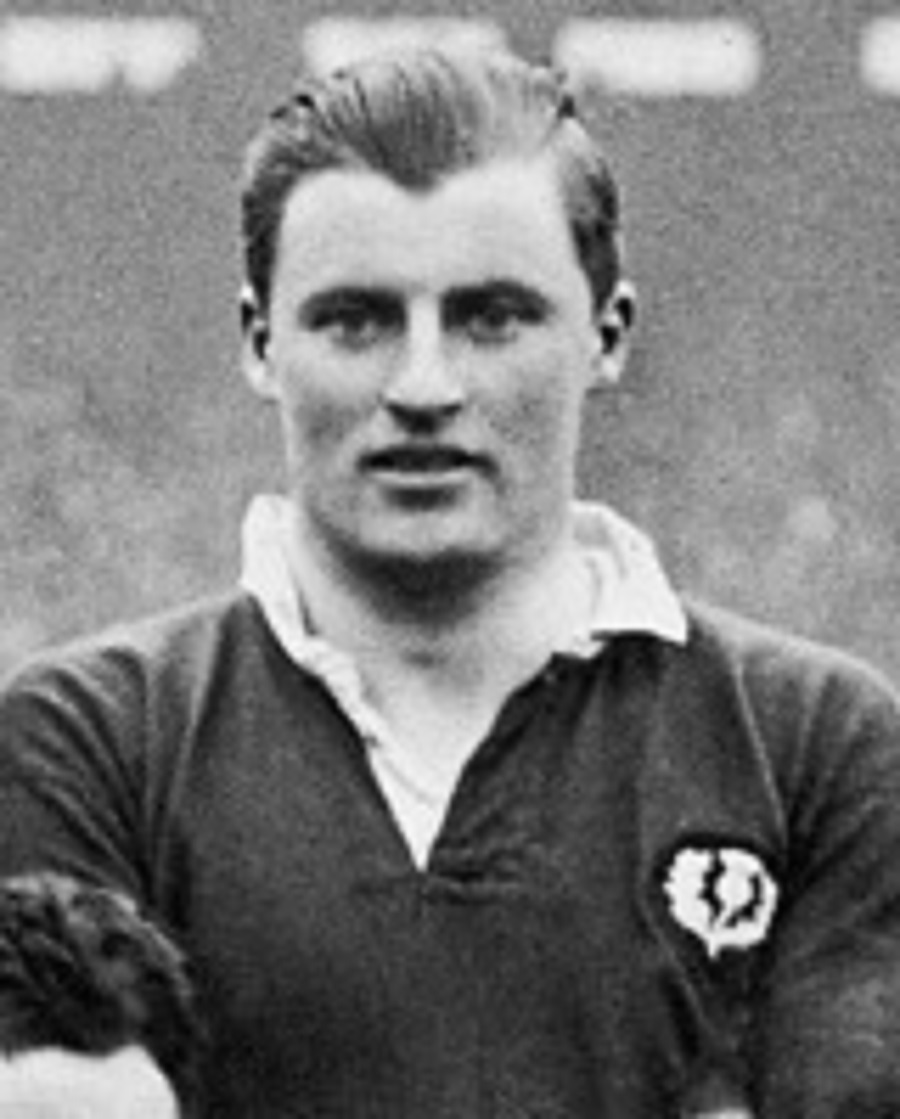
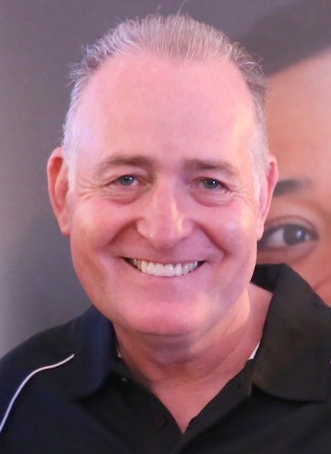
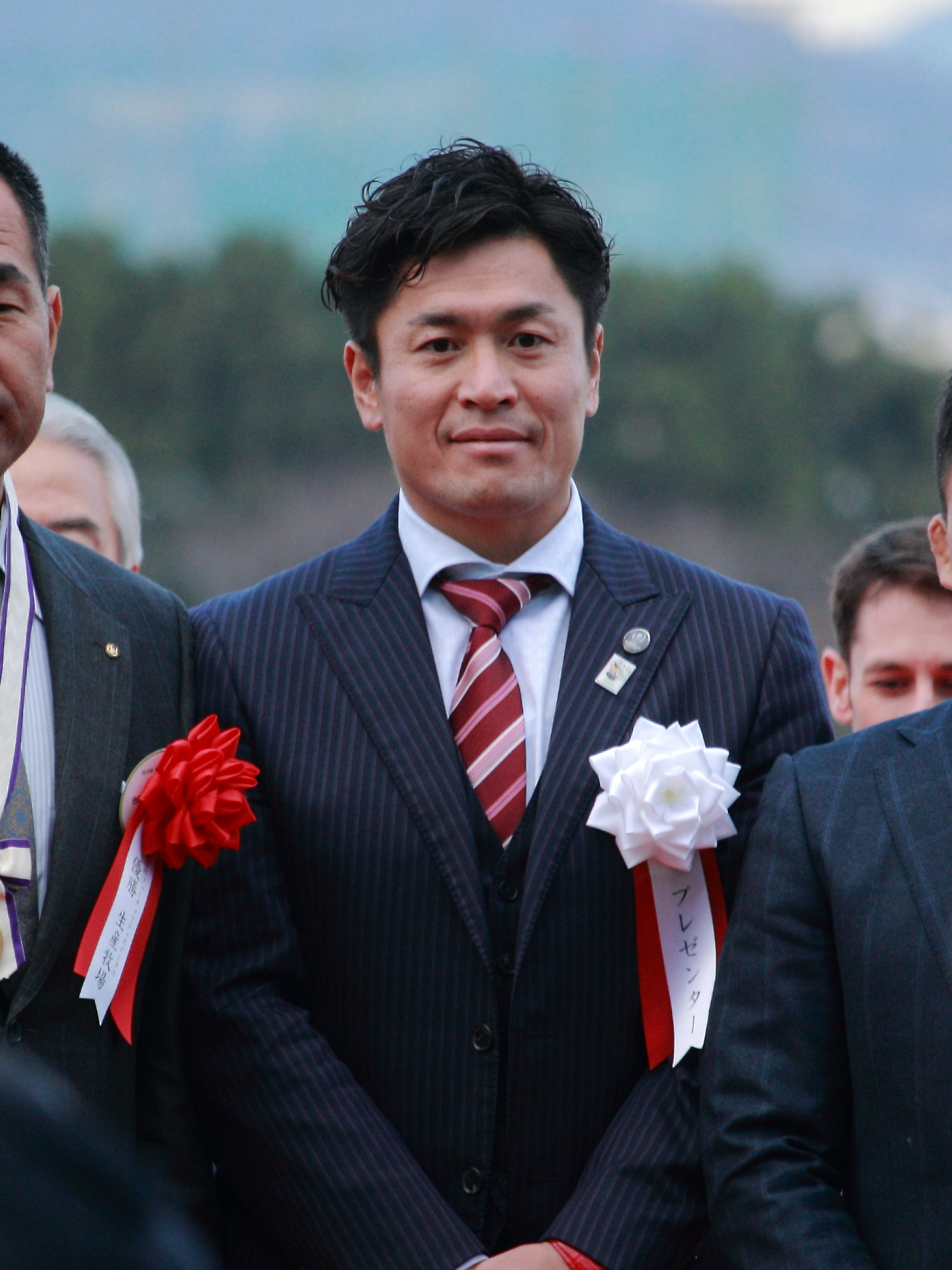
- Top left: Angus Buchanan was the first international try-scorer (Scotland).
- Top right: Ian Smith (Scotland) held the try-record for the longest period of time (58 years, 89 days).
- Bottom left: David Campese (Australia) took Ian Smith's try-record of twenty-four and moved the record to sixty-four.
- Bottom right: Daisuke Ohata (Japan) holds the current record (69 tries).

This is a list of the leading try scorers in men's rugby union test matches. It includes players with a minimum of 30 test tries.

== Try scorers ==
As of 21 November 2026.

| **Bold** | Player is still playing at international level. |
| Italics | Player is still playing, but not for a national team. |
| | Indicates the top try-scorer for their national team. |

International tries
| No. | Player | Team(s) | Tries | Caps | Try ratio | Time | List | Ref. |
|---|---|---|---|---|---|---|---|---|
| 1 | Daisuke Ohata | Japan | **69** (Note: Two of Ohata's tries were scored against Australia A and England A, and three against the Arabian Gulf, which has since been disbanded.) | 58 | 1.19 | 1996–2006 | —N/a | |
| 2 | Bryan Habana | South Africa | **67** | 124 | 0.54 | 2004–2016 | List | |
| 3 | David Campese | Australia | **64** | 101 | 0.63 | 1982–1996 | List | |
| 4 | Shane Williams | Wales (58); British & Irish Lions (2) | **60** | 91 | 0.66 | 2000–2011 | List | |
| 5 | **Akaki Tabutsadze** | Georgia | **58** | 66 | 0.88 | 2020– | —N/a | |
| 6 | **Will Jordan** | New Zealand | **56** | 65 | 0.86 | 2020– | List | |
| 7 | Hirotoki Onozawa | Japan | **55** | 81 | 0.68 | 2001–2013 | —N/a | |
| 8 | **Beauden Barrett** | New Zealand | **51** | 150 | 0.34 | 2012– | List | |
| 9 | Rory Underwood | England (49); British & Irish Lions (1) | **50** | 91 | 0.55 | 1984–1996 | List | |
| 10 | Doug Howlett | New Zealand | **49** | 62 | 0.79 | 2000–2007 | —N/a | |
| 10 | George North | Wales (47); British & Irish Lions (2) | **49** | 123 | 0.40 | 2010–2024 | —N/a | |
| 12 | Brian O'Driscoll | Ireland (46); British & Irish Lions (1) | **47** | 141 | 0.33 | 1999–2014 | List | |
| 13 | Julian Savea | New Zealand | **46** | 54 | 0.85 | 2012–2017 | List | |
| 13 | Christian Cullen | New Zealand | **46** | 58 | 0.79 | 1996–2002 | List | |
| 13 | Joe Rokocoko | New Zealand | **46** | 68 | 0.68 | 2003–2010 | —N/a | |
| 16 | Jeff Wilson | New Zealand | **44** | 60 | 0.73 | 1993–2002 | —N/a | |
| 17 | **Rodrigo Marta** | Portugal | **43** | 51 | 0.84 | 2018– | —N/a | |
| 18 | **Darcy Graham** | Scotland | **41** | 59 | 0.69 | 2018– | List | |
| 18 | **Damian Penaud** | France | **41** | 60 | 0.68 | 2017– | List | |
| 18 | Gareth Thomas | Wales (40); British & Irish Lions (1) | **41** | 103 | 0.40 | 1995–2007 | —N/a | |
| 21 | Chris Latham | Australia | **40** | 78 | 0.51 | 1998–2007 | —N/a | |
| 21 | **Rieko Ioane** | New Zealand | **40** | 94 | 0.43 | 2016– | List | |
| 23 | Ben Smith | New Zealand | **39** | 84 | 0.46 | 2009–2019 | List | |
| 23 | Adam Ashley-Cooper | Australia | **39** | 121 | 0.32 | 2005–2019 | —N/a | |
| 25 | D.T.H. van der Merwe | Canada | **38** | 61 | 0.62 | 2006–2019 | —N/a | |
| 25 | Joost van der Westhuizen | South Africa | **38** | 89 | 0.43 | 1993–2003 | List | |
| 25 | Serge Blanco | France | **38** | 93 | 0.41 | 1980–1991 | —N/a | |
| 28 | Jonah Lomu | New Zealand | **37** | 63 | 0.59 | 1994–2002 | List | |
| 28 | Israel Folau | Australia (37); Tonga | **37** | 75 | 0.49 | 2013–2023 | List | |
| 28 | Tana Umaga | New Zealand | **37** | 74 | 0.49 | 1997–2005 | —N/a | |
| 28 | Jonny May | England | **37** | 78 | 0.46 | 2013–2023 | List | |
| 28 | Keith Earls | Ireland | **37** | 101 | 0.36 | 2008–2023 | List | |
| 33 | **Duhan van der Merwe** | Scotland (34); British & Irish Lions (1) | **35** | 56 | 0.63 | 2020– | List | |
| 33 | John Kirwan | New Zealand | **35** | 63 | 0.56 | 1984–1994 | —N/a | |
| 33 | **Ardie Savea** | New Zealand | **35** | 112 | 0.31 | 2016– | List | |
| 36 | Vincent Clerc | France | **34** | 67 | 0.51 | 2002–2013 | List | |
| 36 | Drew Mitchell | Australia | **34** | 71 | 0.48 | 2005–2016 | —N/a | |
| 36 | Ieuan Evans | Wales (33); British & Irish Lions (1) | **34** | 79 | 0.43 | 1987–1998 | —N/a | |
| 36 | Mils Muliaina | New Zealand | **34** | 100 | 0.34 | 2003–2011 | —N/a | |
| 40 | **Makazole Mapimpi** | South Africa | **33** | 47 | 0.70 | 2018– | List | |
| 40 | Sitiveni Sivivatu | New Zealand (29); Pacific Islanders (4) | **33** | 48 | 0.69 | 2005–2011 | —N/a | |
| 40 | Diego Ormaechea | Uruguay | **33** | 54 | 0.61 | 1979–1999 | —N/a | |
| 40 | **Malcolm Marx** | South Africa | **33** | 97 | 0.34 | 2016– | | |
| 40 | Cătălin Fercu | Romania | **33** | 109 | 0.30 | 2005–2020 | —N/a | |
| 45 | Takashi Kikutani | Japan | **32** | 68 | 0.47 | 2005–2014 | —N/a | |
| 45 | Philippe Saint-André | France | **32** | 69 | 0.46 | 1990–1997 | —N/a | |
| 45 | Jaque Fourie | South Africa | **32** | 72 | 0.44 | 2003–2014 | List | |
| 48 | **Louis Bielle-Biarrey** | France | **31** | 30 | 1.03 | 2023– | | |
| 48 | César Sempere | Spain | **31** | 56 | 0.55 | 2004–2014 | —N/a | |
| 48 | Ben Cohen | England | **31** | 57 | 0.54 | 2000–2006 | List | |
| 48 | Will Greenwood | England | **31** | 57 | 0.54 | 1997–2004 | List | |
| 48 | Jeremy Guscott | England (30); British & Irish Lions (1) | **31** | 73 | 0.42 | 1989–1999 | —N/a | |
| 48 | Ma'a Nonu | New Zealand | **31** | 103 | 0.30 | 2003–2015 | —N/a | |
| 54 | Jason Robinson | England (28); British & Irish Lions (2) | **30** | 56 | 0.54 | 2001–2007 | List | |
| 54 | Lote Tuqiri | Australia | **30** | 67 | 0.45 | 2003–2009 | —N/a | |
| 54 | Tommy Bowe | Ireland | **30** | 74 | 0.41 | 2004–2017 | List | |
| 54 | Tim Horan | Australia | **30** | 80 | 0.38 | 1989–2000 | —N/a | |
| 54 | Joe Roff | Australia | **30** | 86 | 0.35 | 1996–2004 | —N/a | |
| 54 | Matt Giteau | Australia | **30** | 103 | 0.29 | 2002–2016 | —N/a | |
| 54 | Philippe Sella | France | **30** | 111 | 0.27 | 1982–1995 | —N/a | |

== See also ==
- International rugby union player records
- List of leading rugby union drop goal scorers
- List of leading rugby union test point scorers
- List of rugby union test caps leaders
