= CIS (rugby union) =

Rugby union side that played matches during 1991 and 1992

CIS was a rugby union side that played matches in 1992. The side consisted of members of the Commonwealth of Independent States and was the successor team of the Soviet Union. The team played two matches, losing both fixtures. One match was played in Moscow, with the other was played in Seville.

== Results ==
Year	Month	Date	Opposition	Competition	Venue	F	A
1992	November	3	Italy	Friendly	Moscow	6	34
1992	November	17	Spain	Friendly	Seville	16	19

== See also ==
- USSR national rugby union team
