= Irakli Kiziriya =

Irakli I. Kiziriia/Kiziriya (Georgian: ირაკლი კიზირია, Russian: Иракли И. Кизирия) was a Georgian /Soviet rugby union player, who played for the national team. He was a Soviet Master of Sport.
