= Boris Petrovich Gavrilov =

Soviet rugby union player

Boris Gavrilov
- Born: 23 March 1944; Moscow, USSR
- Died: 7 January 2006 (aged 61); Moscow, Russia
- Known for: Rugby international

Boris Petrovich Gavrilov (Russian: Борис Петрович Гаврилов; 23 March 1944 – 7 January 2006) was a Soviet rugby union player, who played for the national team. He was a Soviet Master of Sport.

He played for Fili rugby club, and was active in the 1970s.
