= Soviet Union national rugby union team =

Soviet Union
- Union: Federation of USSR Rugby Union Players
Team kit	Change kit

First international
- Soviet Union 31–10 Griviţa Roşie (ro) (4 August 1974)

Largest win
- Soviet Union 72–0 Sweden (30 October 1976)

Largest defeat
- England 53–0 Soviet Union (7 September 1991)

World Cup
- Appearances: 0

The USSR national rugby union team represented the Soviet Union in rugby union until the early 1990s.

== History ==
Although tournaments such as the Soviet Cup and the Soviet Championship existed, rugby never became a major sport in the USSR. Rugby union was the more popular of the two rugby codes, however, as rugby league only began being played following the collapse of the Soviet Union.

Rugby football was played in the Russian Empire as early as 1884; however, the first official match, played in Moscow, did not take place until 1923. Because of the Russian Revolution, some Soviet/Russian players emigrated and/or ended up playing for foreign sides, a notable example being Prince Alexander Obolensky (Александр Сергеевич Оболенский) who played for Oxford and England in the 1930s – he was the scorer of 2 tries on his England debut in their win over New Zealand in January 1936. His noble birth precluded him from playing in his home country and his family had fled the country when he was only a year old.

In 1935 the Moscow Championship was initiated, followed by the first Soviet Championship which took place in 1936.

In 1949, rugby union was forbidden throughout the USSR during the "fight against cosmopolitanism". Competition was resumed in 1957, and the Soviet Championship recommenced in 1966. In 1975, the Soviet national team played their first ever match.

During the 1970s and 1980s, the Soviet team began to improve their performances, often coming second to France, or third to Romania in the FIRA tournament. The team were never given the opportunity to play a tier 1 nation where test caps were awarded.

The organisers of the 1987 Rugby World Cup had intended to invite the USSR as one of the participants. However, before the invitation could be made, the USSR refused to take part on political grounds, allegedly due to the continued IRB membership of South Africa. The first tournament was by invitation rather than qualification, and despite successes against teams such as Italy and Romania in the years leading up to the inaugural Cup, the USSR did not enter.

The Soviet team did not attempt to qualify for the 1991 Rugby World Cup finals. They played their last game against Spain in the FIRA tournament in November 1991, shortly before the country's own dissolution. The USSR's successor was briefly the Commonwealth of Independent States, after which the former constituent states formed their own national teams.

=== The FIRA Trophy 1974–1997 ===
Year(s)	Winner	Second place	Third place
1973–74	France	Romania	Spain
1974–75	Romania	France	Italy
1975–76	France	Italy	Romania
1976–77	Romania	France	Italy
1977–78	France	Romania	Spain
1978–79	France	Romania	Soviet Union
1979–80	France	Romania	Italy
1980–81	Romania	France	Soviet Union
1981–82	France	Italy	Romania
1982–83	Romania	Italy	Soviet Union
1983–84	France	Romania	Italy
1984–85	France	Soviet Union	Italy
1985–87	France	Soviet Union	Romania
1987–89	France	Soviet Union	Romania
1989–90	France	Soviet Union	Romania
1990–92	France	Italy	Romania
1992–94	France	Italy	Romania
1995–97	Italy	France	Romania

== USSR tour to New Zealand ==
In 1991, in preparation for the Rugby World Cup New Zealand hosted short tours by Western Samoa, Fiji, Romania and the USSR. There were no matches of Test status played by New Zealand against the tourists, but a side designated "New Zealand XV" met both the Romanians and Soviets, and both opponents awarded caps for the XV game. The tours gave the New Zealand selectors a chance to gauge the form of players likely to be on the periphery of selection for the World Cup.

The USSR tour party comprised 26 players and was led from the front-row by Sergei Molchenov. They won four and lost four matches:

Date	Opposition	Score	Result	Location
May 25	Nelson Bays	25–24	Won	Nelson
May 29	Marlborough	23–16	Won	Blenheim
June 1	Canterbury	15–73	Loss	Christchurch
June 5	Mid Canterbury	33–10	Won	Ashburton
June 8	Otago	11–37	Loss	Dunedin
June 12	Taranaki	16–39	Loss	New Plymouth
June 16	New Zealand XV	6-56	Loss	Hamilton
June 18	King Country	22-15	Win	Te Kuiti

The teams in the "test" match:

June 16, 1991 at Rugby Park, Hamilton
New Zealand XV 56 (8G 2T) – USSR 6 (1PG 1DG)

New Zealand XV: E J Crossan; E Clarke, W K Maunsell, T D L Tagaloa; A F McCormick, J P Preston; J A Hewett; O M Brown, N J Hewitt, M R Allen, R M Brooke, D W Mayhew, M P Carter, W T Shelford (captain), W R Gordon

Tries: McCormick (2), Crossan (2), Maunsell (2), Tagaloa (2), Shelford, Carter
Conversions: Crossan (8)

Soviet Union: V Voropaev; A Zakarliuk, I Kuperman, A Kovalenko, I Mironov; S Boldakov, A Bychkov; E Kabylkin, S Molchenov (captain), R Bikbov, S Sergeev, E Ganiakhin, V Negodin, A Ogryzkov, A Tikhonov
Replacements used: Y Nikolaev, V Zykov

Penalty Goal: Boldakov
Dropped Goal: Boldakov

Referee: Mr D J Bishop

== Soviet tour to England ==
In September, the USSR were guests of the RFU and played the Combined London Old Boys at Croxley Green (OMTs' ground) before meeting an England XV in a World Cup warm-up game on September 7, 1991 at Twickenham where they lost 53–0 to a full-strength non-cap XV side led by Will Carling.

== Final games as CIS ==
Their last representative matches as a united Soviet side were during the 1991–92 season. A team labelled "CIS" fulfilled their remaining FIRA Championship fixtures against Italy, Spain, Romania and France A.

Russia has competed as a separate entity at the international level since 1992.

== Notable players ==
200 Soviet players became Masters of Sport. Two notable ones are:

- B.P. Gavrilov (Б. П. Гаврилов)
- I.I. Kiziriia (И. И. Кизирия)

== Record ==
Below is a table of the representative rugby matches played by a Soviet Union national XV at test level up until 17 November 1991, updated after match with Spain.

Opponent	Played	Won	Lost	Drawn	% Won
Bulgaria	1	1	0	0	100%
Czechoslovakia	7	5	2	0	71.43%
East Germany	4	4	0	0	100%
England A	2	0	2	0	0%
France A	13	3	9	1	23.08%
Italy	14	9	4	1	64.29%
Morocco	3	3	0	0	100%
New Zealand XV	1	0	1	0	0%
Poland	20	18	2	0	90%
Portugal	2	2	0	0	100%
Romania	15	3	12	0	20%
Romania A	1	0	1	0	0%
Spain	7	7	0	0	100%
Sweden	2	2	0	0	100%
Tunisia	3	3	0	0	100%
United States	1	1	0	0	100%
Yugoslavia	2	2	0	0	100%
West Germany	6	5	1	0	83.33%
Zimbabwe	4	2	2	0	50%
Total	108	70	36	2	64.81%

== Successor teams ==
The rugby teams of the USSR's successor states have had varying success.

Initially, the former USSR competed under the Commonwealth of Independent States banner, but this itself terminated in 1992. It had played four matches.

The most successful "successor" rugby team has been Georgia, which competed in the 2003 Rugby World Cup, 2007, 2011, 2015 and 2019. They had a respectable performance against Ireland and defeated Namibia twice in 2007 and 2015, defeated Tonga 17-10 in 2015. The Rugby World Cup, coincidentally, got going at around the point that the Soviet Union was disintegrating – no other ex-Soviet team other than Georgia had ever qualified until 2011 when Russia qualified, and the early World Cups were also smaller tournaments. The Georgia Rugby Union was founded in 1964, but did not compete as a national team during the Soviet Era.

As of 3 March 2008, however, Russia's form had improved greatly, being placed at 17th position in the world rankings, ahead of Portugal, the USA, Japan, and coming one point behind Romania.

After the 2022 Russian invasion of Ukraine, World Rugby and Rugby Europe suspended Russia from international and European continental rugby union competition. In addition, the Rugby Union of Russia was suspended from World Rugby and Rugby Europe.

=== ENC ===
The following successor teams are in the European Nations Cup:

- Armenia national rugby union team
- Azerbaijan national rugby union team
- Estonia national rugby union team
- Georgia national rugby union team
- Latvia national rugby union team
- Lithuania national rugby union team
- Moldova national rugby union team
- Russia national rugby union team
- Ukraine national rugby union team

=== Non-ENC ===
- Kazakhstan national rugby union team
- Kyrgyzstan national rugby union team
- Uzbekistan national rugby union team
