= International rugby union player records =

These are men's player records in international rugby, updated at the conclusion of the Autumn internationals window each year.

To view men's international team records, see International rugby union team records. To view records of the men's Rugby World Cup, see Records and statistics of the Rugby World Cup.

== Career ==
=== Caps ===
Most individual test caps
Caps	Player	International team	First/latest appearance	Primary position	Ref(s).
170	Alun Wyn Jones	Wales (158); British and Irish Lions (12)	2006–2023	Lock	
153	Sam Whitelock	New Zealand	2010–2023	Lock	
151	James Slipper	Australia	2010–2025	Prop	
150	**Beauden Barrett**	New Zealand	2012–present	Fly-half	
148	Richie McCaw	New Zealand	2001–2015	Flanker	
148	**Eben Etzebeth**	South Africa	2012–present	Lock	
142	Sergio Parisse	Italy	2002–2019	Number 8	
141	Brian O'Driscoll	Ireland (133); British and Irish Lions (8)	1999–2014	Centre	
139	George Gregan	Australia	1994–2007	Scrum-half	
137	Cian Healy	Ireland	2009–2025	Prop	
134	Gethin Jenkins	Wales (129); British and Irish Lions (5)	2002–2018	Prop	
133	Conor Murray	Ireland (125); British and Irish Lions (8)	2011–2025	Scrum-half	
132	Keven Mealamu	New Zealand	2002–2015	Hooker	
130	Ronan O'Gara	Ireland (128); British and Irish Lions (2)	2000–2013	Fly-half	
129	Stephen Moore	Australia	2005–2017	Hooker	
129	Florin Vlaicu	Romania	2006–2022	Fly-half	
129	Ben Youngs	England (127); British and Irish Lions (2)	2010–2023	Scrum-half	
127	Victor Matfield	South Africa	2001–2015	Lock	
127	Kieran Read	New Zealand	2008–2019	Number 8	

*Players who are still active at international level, or who have not yet announced international retirement, are in bold. Players who are still active at club level but have either retired from international rugby or have not been selected for their national team for a year or more are in italics.

=== Caps as captain ===
Most individual test caps as captain
Caps	Player	International team	First/latest appearance	Primary position	Ref(s).
110	Richie McCaw	New Zealand	2004–2015	Flanker	
94	Sergio Parisse	Italy	2008–2019	Number 8	
84	Brian O'Driscoll	Ireland (83); British and Irish Lions (1)	1999–2014	Centre	
83	John Smit	South Africa	2003–2011	Hooker	
72	Mihai Macovei	Romania	2012–2023	Flanker	
71	**Siya Kolisi**	South Africa	2018–present	Flanker	
69	Michael Hooper	Australia	2012–2023	Flanker	
59	Will Carling	England	1988–1996	Centre	
59	George Gregan	Australia	2001–2007	Scrum-half	
56	Thierry Dusautoir	France	2009–2015	Flanker	
56	Merab Sharikadze	Georgia	2011–2024	Centre	
55	John Eales	Australia	1996–2001	Lock	
55	**Julián Montoya**	Argentina	2021–present	Hooker	
53	Sam Warburton	Wales (49); British and Irish Lions (4)	2011–2017	Flanker	
52	Kieran Read	New Zealand	2008–2019	Number 8	
52	Alun Wyn Jones	Wales (48); British and Irish Lions (4)	2009–2021	Lock	

*Players who are still active at international level, or who have not yet announced international retirement, are in bold. Players who are still active at club level but have either retired from international rugby or have not been selected for their national team for a year or more are in italics.

=== Wins ===
Most individual test wins
Wins	Player	International team	First/latest appearance	Primary position	Lost	Drawn	%	Ref(s).
131	Richie McCaw	New Zealand	2001–2015	Flanker	15	2	89.19%	
125	Sam Whitelock	New Zealand	2010–2023	Lock	22	6	83.66%	
118	**Beauden Barrett**	New Zealand	2012–present	Flyhalf	28	4	78.67%	
114	Keven Mealamu	New Zealand	2002–2015	Hooker	16	2	87.12%	
107	Kieran Read	New Zealand	2008–2019	Number 8	16	4	85.83%	
102	Tony Woodcock	New Zealand	2002–2015	Prop	15	1	86.86%	
100	Aaron Smith	New Zealand	2012–2023	Scrum-half	19	6	82.40%	
99	Dan Carter	New Zealand	2003–2015	Flyhalf	12	1	88.83%	
93	George Gregan	Australia	1994–2007	Scrum-half	44	2	67.62%	
92	Brodie Retallick	New Zealand	2012–2023	Lock	13	4	86.24%	
91	Owen Franks	New Zealand	2009–2019	Prop	13	4	86.11%	
91	Ma'a Nonu	New Zealand	2003–2015	Centre	10	2	89.32%	
91	**Eben Etzebeth**	South Africa	2012–present	Lock	45	5	66.31%	
89	Jason Leonard	England	1990–2004	Prop	28	2	75.63%	
86	Ben Youngs	England (85); British and Irish Lions (1)	2010–2023	Scrum-half	40	3	67.83%	
84	Mils Muliaina	New Zealand	2003–2011	Fullback	16	0	84.00%	
84	Conrad Smith	New Zealand	2004–2015	Centre	9	1	89.89%	

*Players who are still active at international level, or who have not yet announced international retirement, are in bold. Players who are still active at club level but have either retired from international rugby or have not been selected for their national team for a year or more are in italics.

=== Consecutive wins ===
Most consecutive match wins by a player
Matches	Player	International team	First	Opp	Last	Opp	End	Score	Opp
32	Wyatt Crockett	New Zealand	23 August 2014	Australia	24 June 2017	British and Irish Lions	1 July 2017	21–24	British and Irish Lions
28	Lawrence Dallaglio	England	24 June 2000	South Africa	21 February 2004	Scotland	6 March 2004	13–19	Ireland
22	Ben Kay	England	23 March 2002	Wales	21 February 2004	Scotland	6 March 2004	13–19	Ireland
22	Brodie Retallick	New Zealand	15 August 2015	Australia	24 June 2017	British and Irish Lions	1 July 2017	21–24	British and Irish Lions
21	Will Greenwood	England	23 March 2002	Wales	21 February 2004	Scotland	6 March 2004	13–19	Ireland
21	Leon MacDonald	New Zealand	27 August 2005	South Africa	23 September 2007	Scotland	6 October 2007	18–20	France
21	Ma'a Nonu	New Zealand	11 October 2003	Italy	5 July 2008	South Africa	12 July 2008	28–30	South Africa
21	Anthony Boric*	New Zealand	2 August 2008	Australia	1 October 2011	Canada	N	N	N
21	Sam Whitelock	New Zealand	15 August 2015	Australia	24 June 2017	British and Irish Lions	1 July 2017	21–24	British and Irish Lions
20	Jason Robinson	England	7 April 2002	Italy	21 February 2004	Scotland	6 March 2004	13–19	Ireland
20	Ben Franks	New Zealand	9 September 2011	Tonga	24 November 2013	Ireland	16 August 2014	12–12	Australia
20	Charlie Faumuina	New Zealand	19 September 2009	Australia	22 October 2016	Australia	5 November 2016	29–40	Ireland
20	Israel Dagg	New Zealand	19 September 2009	Australia	24 June 2017	British and Irish Lions	1 July 2017	21–24	British and Irish Lions

An asterisk, *, accompanied with 'N', indicates that the sequence is ongoing or unbroken.

*Players who are still active at international level, or who have not yet announced international retirement, are in bold. Players who are still active at club level but have either retired from international rugby or have not been selected for their national team for a year or more are in italics. Players who have played only Tier 1 and/or Tier 2 nations during their winning run are eligible.

=== Consecutive matches without loss ===
Most consecutive matches without loss by a player
Matches	Player	International team	First	Opp	Draw	Score	Opp	End	Score	Opp
49	Wyatt Crockett	New Zealand	8 June 2013	France	16 August 2014	12–12	Australia	1 July 2017	21–24	British and Irish Lions
28	Lawrence Dallaglio	England	24 June 2000	South Africa	N	N	N	6 March 2004	13–19	Ireland
28	Andrew Hore*	New Zealand	9 September 2011	Tonga	20 October 2012	18–18	Australia	N	N	N
27	Ma'a Nonu*	New Zealand	8 June 2013	France	20 October 2012	18–18	Australia	N	N	N
26	Brodie Retallick	New Zealand	8 June 2013	France	20 October 2012	18–18	Australia	8 August 2015	19–27	Australia
25	Alan Whetton^{1}	New Zealand	18 August 1984	Australia	2 November 1985/ 16 July 1988	21–21/ 19–19	Argentina/ Australia	18 August 1990	9–21	Australia
25	Ben Franks	New Zealand	9 September 2011	Tonga	16 August 2014	12–12	Australia	4 October 2014	25–27	South Africa
24	Grant Fox	New Zealand	26 October 1985	Argentina	16 July 1988	19–19	Australia	18 August 1990	9–21	Australia
24	**Beauden Barrett**	New Zealand	23 June 2012	Ireland	16 August 2014	12–12	Australia	4 October 2014	25–27	South Africa
23	Sean Fitzpatrick	New Zealand	22 May 1987	Italy	16 July 1988	19–19	Australia	18 August 1990	9–21	Australia
23	Gary Whetton	New Zealand	22 May 1987	Italy	16 July 1988	19–19	Australia	18 August 1990	9–21	Australia
23	Aaron Cruden	New Zealand	8 June 2013	France	16 August 2014	12–12	Australia	5 November 2016	29–40	Ireland

An asterisk, *, accompanied with 'N', indicates that the sequence is ongoing or unbroken. N may also indicate the unbeaten run was uninterrupted by any draws or losses.

^1A. Whetton was involved in two draws during his unbeaten run.

Players who are still active at international level, or who have not yet announced international retirement, are in bold. Players who are still active at club level but have either retired from international rugby or have not been selected for their national team for a year or more are in italics. Players who have played only Tier 1 and/or Tier 2 nations during their unbeaten run are eligible.

=== Most points ===
As of 27 July 2025

Most points by a player
Points	Player	Position	International team(s)	Years active	Caps	Tries	Con	Pen	DG	Avg. pts (per game)	Ref
1598	Dan Carter	Fly-half	New Zealand	2003–2015	112	29	293	281	8	14.26	
1271	**Owen Farrell**	Fly-half	England (1237); British and Irish Lions (34)	2012–present	119	10	201	268	5	10.68	
1246	Jonny Wilkinson	Fly-half	England (1179); British and Irish Lions (67)	1998–2011	97	7	169	255	36	12.85	
1113	Johnny Sexton	Fly-half	Ireland (1108); British and Irish Lions (5)	2009–2023	124	19	182	214	4	8.98	
1090	Neil Jenkins	Fly-half	Wales (1049); British and Irish Lions (41)	1990–2003	87	11	131	248	10	12.53	
1083	Ronan O'Gara	Fly-half	Ireland (1083); British and Irish Lions (0)	2000–2013	130	16	176	202	15	8.33	
1030	Florin Vlaicu	Fly-half	Romania	2006–2022	129	14	173	203	4	7.98	
1010	Diego Domínguez	Fly-half	Argentina (27); Italy (983)	1989–2003	76	9	133	213	20	13.29	
970	Stephen Jones	Fly-half	Wales (917); British and Irish Lions (53)	1998–2011	110	7	160	198	7	8.82	
967	Andrew Mehrtens	Fly-half	New Zealand	1995–2004	70	7	169	186	12	13.81	

Players currently active at international level are listed in bold; those not playing at international level but still active at club level are listed in italics. Players whose rows are in italics represent nations classed as Tier 2, since the beginning of the professional era (August 1995), and primarily play other Tier 2, or Tier 3 nations.

=== Most tries ===
As of 13 October 2026

Most tries by a player
Tries	Player	Position	National team	Caps	Tries PG	Years	Ref
69	Daisuke Ohata	Wing	Japan	58	1.190	1996–2006	
67	Bryan Habana	Wing	South Africa	124	.540	2004–2016	
64	David Campese	Wing	Australia	101	.633	1982–1996	
60	Shane Williams	Wing	Wales (58); British and Irish Lions (2)	91	.659	2000–2011	
56	**Will Jordan**	Wing	New Zealand	65	.860	2020–present	
55	Hirotoki Onozawa	Fullback	Japan	81	.679	2001–2013	
53	Rory Underwood	Wing	England (49); British and Irish Lions (1)	91	.549	1984–1996	
52	**Akaki Tabutsadze**	Wing	Georgia	63	.810	2020–present	
51	**Beauden Barrett**	Fly-half	New Zealand	150	.340	2012–present	
49	Doug Howlett	Wing	New Zealand	62	.790	2000–2007	
49	George North	Wing	Wales (47); British and Irish Lions (2)	124	.395	2010–2024	
47	Brian O'Driscoll	Centre	Ireland (46); British and Irish Lions (1)	141	.330	1999–2014	
46	Christian Cullen	Fullback	New Zealand	58	.793	1996–2002	
46	Joe Rokocoko	Wing	New Zealand	68	.676	2003–2010	
46	Julian Savea	Wing	New Zealand	54	.852	2012–2017	
44	Jeff Wilson	Wing	New Zealand	60	.730	1993–2002	

Players currently active at international level are listed in bold; those not playing at international level but still active at club level are listed in italics. Players whose rows are in italics represent nations classed as Tier 2, since the beginning of the professional era (August 1995), and primarily play other Tier 2, or Tier 3 nations.

=== Most conversions ===
Updated: December 2025

Most conversions by a player
Conv	Player	Position	International team(s)	Years active	Caps	Avg. con (per game)	Ref
293	Dan Carter	Fly-half	New Zealand	2003–2015	112	2.62	
201	Owen Farrell	Fly-half	England (199); British and Irish Lions (2)	2012–present	119	1.68	
199	**Beauden Barrett**	Fly-half	New Zealand	2012–present	150	1.33	
182	Johnny Sexton	Fly-half	Ireland (182); British and Irish Lions (0)	2009–2023	124	1.47	
176	Ronan O'Gara	Fly-half	Ireland (176); British and Irish Lions (0)	2000–2013	130	1.35	
173	Florin Vlaicu	Fly-half	Romania	2006–2022	129	1.34	
169	Andrew Mehrtens	Fly-half	New Zealand	1995–2004	70	2.41	
169	Jonny Wilkinson	Fly-half	England (162); British and Irish Lions (7)	1998–2011	97	1.74	
162	Ayumu Goromaru	Fly-half	Japan	2005–2015	57	2.84	
160	Stephen Jones	Fly-half	Wales (153); British and Irish Lions (7)	1998–2011	110	1.45	
155	Yuri Kushnarev	Fly-half	Russia	2005–2021	120	1.29	
153	Percy Montgomery	Fullback	South Africa	1997–2008	102	1.50	

Players currently active at international level are listed in bold; those not playing at international level but still active at club level are listed in italics. Players whose rows are in italics represent nations classed as Tier 2, since the beginning of the professional era (August 1995), and primarily play other Tier 2, or Tier 3 nations.

=== Most penalties ===
Updated: 27 July 2025

Most penalties by a player
Penalties	Player	Position	International team(s)	Years active	Caps	Avg. pen (per game)	Ref
281	Dan Carter	Fly-half	New Zealand	2003–2015	112	2.51	
268	Owen Farrell	Fly-half	England (258); British and Irish Lions (10)	2012–present	119	2.25	
255	Jonny Wilkinson	Fly-half	England (239); British and Irish Lions (16)	1998–2011	97	2.63	
248	Neil Jenkins	Fly-half	Wales (235); British and Irish Lions (13)	1991–2002	91	2.73	
214	Johnny Sexton	Fly-half	Ireland (214); British and Irish Lions (0)	2009–2023	124	1.73	
213	Diego Domínguez	Fly-half	Argentina (5); Italy (208)	1989–2003	76	2.80	
203	Florin Vlaicu	Fly-half	Romania	2006–2022	129	1.57	
202	Ronan O'Gara	Fly-half	Ireland (202); British and Irish Lions (0)	2000–2013	130	1.55	
201	Leigh Halfpenny	Fullback	Wales (188); British and Irish Lions (13)	2008–2023	105	1.91	
198	Stephen Jones	Fly-half	Wales (186); British and Irish Lions (12)	1998–2011	110	1.80	
188	Andrew Mehrtens	Fly-half	New Zealand	1995–2004	70	2.69	

Players currently active at international level are listed in bold; those not playing at international level but still active at club level are listed in italics. Players whose rows are in italics represent nations classed as Tier 2, since the beginning of the professional era (August 1995), and primarily play other Tier 2, or Tier 3 nations.

=== Most drop goals ===
Most drop goals by a player
Drop goals	Player	Position	International team(s)	Years active	Caps	Avg. DG (per game)	Ref
36	Jonny Wilkinson	Fly-half	England (36); British and Irish Lions (0)	1998–2011	97	0.37	
28	Hugo Porta	Fly-half	Argentina (26); South American Jaguars (2)	1971–1990	66	0.42	
23	Rob Andrew	Fly-half	England (21); British and Irish Lions (2)	1985–1997	76	0.30	
20	Diego Domínguez	Fly-half	Argentina (0); Italy (20)	1989–2003	76	0.26	
18	Naas Botha	Fly-half	South Africa	1980–1992	28	0.64	
17	Stefano Bettarello	Fly-half	Italy	1979–1988	55	0.31	
17	Dan Parks	Fly-half	Scotland	2004–2012	67	0.25	
15	Jean-Patrick Lescarboura	Fly-half	France	1982–1990	28	0.54	
15	Ronan O'Gara	Fly-half	Ireland (15); British and Irish Lions (0)	2000–2013	130	0.12	
13	Jonathan Davies	Fly-half	Wales	1985–1997	32	0.41	

Players currently active at international level are listed in bold; those not playing at international level but still active at club level are listed in italics.

=== Most red cards ===
Updated: June 2024

Most red cards by a player
Red cards	Player	Position	International team(s)	Years active	Caps	Avg. RC (per year)	Ref
3	**Tomas Lavanini**	Lock	Argentina	2013–	82	0.27	
2	**Charlie Ewels**	Lock	England	2016–	36	0.4	
2	Paul Emerick	Fullback	United States	2003–2012	53	0.2	
2	Chabal Paulo	Prop	Brazil	2013–2018	20	0.33	
2	John Quill	Flanker	United States	2012–2019	37	0.25	
2	Mario Sagario	Prop	Uruguay	2006–2019	76	0.14	
2	Alesana Tuilagi	Wing	Samoa (2); Pacific Islanders (0)	2002–2015	38	0.14	
2	**Mohamed Haouas**	Prop	France	2020–	16	0.5	
2	**Bundee Aki**	Centre	Ireland	2017–	49	0.29	
2	**Scott Barrett**	Lock	New Zealand	2016–	95	0.02	
2	**Zander Fagerson**	Prop	Scotland	2016–	62	0.32	

Players currently active at international level are listed in bold; those not playing at international level but still active at club level are listed in italics. There are 175 players with 1 red card to their name. For the purpose of limiting the list to a reasonable size, only players with 2 red cards are shown here.

=== Most yellow cards ===
Updated as of 31 October 2023

Most yellow cards by a player
Yellow cards	Player	Position	Int. team(s)	Years active	Caps	Avg. YC (per year)	Avg. YC (per game)	Ref
10	Michael Hooper	Flanker	Australia	2012–2023	115	0.83	0.09	
9	**Tomas Lavanini**	Lock	Argentina	2013–	82	0.82	0.11	
8	Vito Kolelishvili	Flanker	Georgia	2008–2018	50	0.73	0.16	
7	Marco Bortolami	Lock	Italy	2001–2015	112	0.47	0.06	
7	Jamie Cudmore	Lock	Canada	2002–2016	43	0.47	0.16	
7	Bryan Habana	Wing	South Africa	2004–2016	124	0.54	0.06	
6	Schalk Burger	Flanker	South Africa	2003–2015	86	0.46	0.07	
6	Giorgi Chkhaidze	Number 8	Georgia	2002–2019	101	0.34	0.06	
6	Todd Clever	Flanker	United States	2003–2017	76	0.40	0.08	
6	**Quade Cooper**	Fly-half	Australia	2008–	91	0.38	0.07	
6	Victor Gresev	Number 8	Russia	2006–2021	106	0.38	0.06	
6	Giorgi Nemsadze	Lock	Georgia	2005–2019	95	0.40	0.06	
6	**Mateo Sanguinetti**	Prop	Uruguay	2014–	77	0.55	0.08	
6	Jardel Vettorato	Prop	Brazil	2006–2019	24	0.43	0.25	
6	Liam Williams	Fullback	Wales	2012–	96	0.43	0.1	
Alexander Widiker	Prop	Germany	2006–2016	43	0.55	0.14		

Players currently active at international level are listed in bold; those not playing at international level but still active at club level are listed in italics.

== Rugby World Cup ==
For the comprehensive list of Rugby World Cup individual records, see Records and statistics of the Rugby World Cup.

=== Appearances ===
Most match appearances
App.	Name	Team	Tournaments
26	Sam Whitelock	New Zealand	2011–2023
22	Agustin Creevy	Argentina	2011–2023
22	Jason Leonard	England	1991–2003
22	Richie McCaw	New Zealand	2003–2015
21	Alun Wyn Jones	Wales	2007–2019
21	James Slipper	Australia	2011–2023
20	Schalk Burger	South Africa	2003–2015
20	Dan Cole	England	2011–2023
20	George Gregan	Australia	1995–2007
20	Keven Mealamu	New Zealand	2003–2015
20	George North	Wales	2011–2023

*Players who are still active at international level, or who have not yet announced international retirement, are in bold. Players who are still active at club level but have either retired from international rugby or have not been selected for their national team for a year or more are in italics.

=== Multiple winners ===
Players to have won multiple Rugby World Cups
Name	Country	Years won
Dan Crowley	Australia	1991, 1999
John Eales	Australia	1991, 1999
Tim Horan	Australia	1991, 1999
Phil Kearns	Australia	1991, 1999
Jason Little	Australia	1991, 1999
Os du Randt	South Africa	1995, 2007
Dan Carter	New Zealand	2011, 2015
Ben Franks	New Zealand	2011, 2015
Owen Franks	New Zealand	2011, 2015
Jerome Kaino	New Zealand	2011, 2015
Richie McCaw	New Zealand	2011, 2015
Keven Mealamu	New Zealand	2011, 2015
Ma'a Nonu	New Zealand	2011, 2015
Kieran Read	New Zealand	2011, 2015
Colin Slade	New Zealand	2011, 2015
Conrad Smith	New Zealand	2011, 2015
Victor Vito	New Zealand	2011, 2015
Sam Whitelock	New Zealand	2011, 2015
Sonny Bill Williams	New Zealand	2011, 2015
Tony Woodcock	New Zealand	2011, 2015
François Steyn	South Africa	2007, 2019
**Damian de Allende**	South Africa	2019, 2023
**Lukhanyo Am**	South Africa	2019, 2023
**Faf de Klerk**	South Africa	2019, 2023
**Pieter-Steph du Toit**	South Africa	2019, 2023
**Eben Etzebeth**	South Africa	2019, 2023
**Steven Kitshoff**	South Africa	2019, 2023
**Vincent Koch**	South Africa	2019, 2023
**Cheslin Kolbe**	South Africa	2019, 2023
**Siya Kolisi**	South Africa	2019, 2023
**Jesse Kriel**	South Africa	2019, 2023
**Willie le Roux**	South Africa	2019, 2023
**Frans Malherbe**	South Africa	2019, 2023
**Makazole Mapimpi**	South Africa	2019, 2023
**Malcolm Marx**	South Africa	2019, 2023
**Bongi Mbonambi**	South Africa	2019, 2023
**Franco Mostert**	South Africa	2019, 2023
**Trevor Nyakane**	South Africa	2019, 2023
**Handré Pollard**	South Africa	2019, 2023
**Cobus Reinach**	South Africa	2019, 2023
**Kwagga Smith**	South Africa	2019, 2023
**RG Snyman**	South Africa	2019, 2023
Duane Vermeulen	South Africa	2019, 2023
**Damian Willemse**	South Africa	2019, 2023

*Players who are still active at international level, or who have not yet announced international retirement, are in bold. Players who are still active at club level but have either retired from international rugby or have not been selected for their national team for a year or more are in italics.

== Calendar year ==
These are player records spanning a calendar year (1 January to 31 December).

=== Most matches ===
Most matches by a player in a year
Matches	Player	Position	International team(s)	Year	Won	Lost	Drawn	W%
16	Philippe Saint-André	Wing	France	1995	12	4	0	75.00%
16	Sylvain Marconnet	Prop	France	2003	8	8	0	50.00%
16	Aurélien Rougerie	Wing	France	2003	9	7	0	56.25%
16	Alun Wyn Jones	Lock	Wales	2011	9	7	0	56.25%
16	Alejo Durán	Fly-half	Uruguay	2015	2	14	0	12.50%
16	Joaquín Prada	Centre	Uruguay	2015	2	14	0	12.50%
16	**Andrés Vilaseca**	Wing	Uruguay	2015	2	14	0	12.50%
16	**Elliot Dee**	Hooker	Wales	2019	11	5	0	68.75%
15	Steve Thompson	Hooker	England	2003	14	1	0	93.33%
15	Dan Carter	Fly-half	New Zealand	2008	13	2	0	86.66%
15	Keven Mealamu	Hooker	New Zealand	2008	13	2	0	86.66%
15	Ma'a Nonu	Centre	New Zealand	2008	13	2	0	86.66%
15	Ali Williams	Lock	New Zealand	2008	13	2	0	86.66%

Players currently active at international level are listed in bold; those not playing at international level but still active at club level are listed in italics.

- There are 37 players who have played 15 Test matches in a calendar year. For the purpose of limiting the list to a reasonable size, the players with the five highest winning percentages are shown here.
- Players whose rows are italicised have matches played against teams not considered their nations top representative side included in their tally.

=== Most wins ===
Players who have played matches involving only Tier 1 and/or Tier 2 nations during the calendar year are eligible.

Most wins by a player in a year
Wins	Player	Position	International team(s)	Year	Matches	Losses	Draws	W%
14	Steve Thompson	Hooker	England	2003	15	1	0	93.33%
14	Lawrence Dallaglio	Number eight	England	2003	14	0	0	100%
14	Will Greenwood	Centre	England	2003	14	0	0	100%
14	Martin Johnson	Lock	England	2003	14	0	0	100%
14	Ben Kay	Lock	England	2003	14	0	0	100%
14	Jason Robinson	Fullback	England	2003	14	0	0	100%
14	Jonny Wilkinson	Fly-Half	England	2003	14	0	0	100%
14	Ben Smith	Fullback-Wing	New Zealand	2013	14	0	0	100%

Players currently active at international level are listed in bold; those not playing at international level but still active at club level are listed in italics.

=== Most points ===
Updated: 12 March 2025

Most points by a player in a year
Points	Player	Position	International team(s)	Year	Matches	Tries	Con	Pen	DG	Avg. pts (per game)	Ref
263	Neil Jenkins	Fly-half	Wales	1999	14	2	32	62	1	18.79	
233	Jonny Wilkinson	Fly-half	England	2003	14	0	28	45	14	16.64	
219	Percy Montgomery	Fullback	South Africa	2007	14	5	52	30	0	15.64	
203	Dan Carter	Fly-half	New Zealand	2008	15	4	33	38	1	13.53	
197	Owen Farrell	Fly-half	England	2016	12	3	28	42	0	16.42	
196	Gavin Hastings	Fullback	Scotland	1995	10	7	25	37	0	19.60	
194	Dan Carter	Fly-half	New Zealand	2010	13	4	39	32	0	14.92	
189	Matt Burke	Fullback	Australia	1996	11	6	37	25	0	17.18	
189	Ayumu Goromaru	Fullback	Japan	2014	10	2	52	25	0	18.90	
189	**Thomas Ramos**	Fullback	France	2023	11	4	44	26	1	17.18	

Players currently active at international level are listed in bold; those not playing at international level but still active at club level are listed in italics. Players whose rows are in italics represent nations classed as Tier 2, since the beginning of the professional era (August 1995), and primarily play other Tier 2, or Tier 3 nations.

=== Most tries ===
Players who have played Tier 1 sides in 50% or more of their test matches in that year are eligible.

Most tries by a player in a year
Tries	Player	Position	National team	Matches	Tries /game	Year	Ref
17	Joe Rokocoko	Wing	New Zealand	12	1.42	2003	
15	**Will Jordan**	Wing	New Zealand	11	1.36	2021	
14	Doug Howlett	Wing	New Zealand	14	1.00	2003	
14	**Damian Penaud**	Wing	France	11	1.27	2023	
13	Bryan Habana	Wing	South Africa	11	1.18	2007	
12	Jonah Lomu	Wing	New Zealand	10	1.20	1995	
12	Philippe Saint-Andre	Wing	France	16	0.75	1995	
12	Christian Cullen	Fullback	New Zealand	12	1.00	1997	
12	Bryan Habana	Wing	South Africa	12	1.00	2005	
12	Chris Ashton	Wing	England	11	1.09	2011	
12	Julian Savea	Wing	New Zealand	9	1.33	2012	
12	Israel Folau	Fullback	Australia	10	1.20	2017	

Players currently active at international level are listed in bold; those not playing at international level but still active at club level are listed in italics.

=== Most conversions ===
Updated: 13 March 2025

Most conversions by a player in a year
Conversions	Player	Position	International team(s)	Year	Matches	Avg. con (per game)	Ref
52	Percy Montgomery	Fullback	South Africa	2007	14	3.71	
45	**Beauden Barrett**	Fly-half	New Zealand	2017	13	3.46	
44	**Thomas Ramos**	Fullback	France	2023	11	4	
40	**Beauden Barrett**	Fly-half	New Zealand	2016	13	3.08	
39	Dan Carter	Fly-half	New Zealand	2010	13	3.00	
36	Bernard Foley	Fly-half	Australia	2017	13	2.77	
36	Owen Farrell	Fly-half	England	2019	14	2.57	
33	Dan Carter	Fly-half	New Zealand	2008	15	2.20	
33	Dan Carter	Fly-half	New Zealand	2015	10	3.30	
32	Neil Jenkins	Fly-half	Wales	1999	14	2.29	
32	Jonny Wilkinson	Fly-half	England	1999	11	2.91	
31	Hugo Porta	Fly-half	Argentina	1985	7	4.43	
31	Grant Fox	Fly-half	New Zealand	1987	7	4.43	
31	Carlos Spencer	Fly-half	New Zealand	1997	8	3.88	
31	Paul Grayson	Fly-half	England	1998	7	4.43	

Players currently active at international level are listed in bold; those not playing at international level but still active at club level are listed in italics.

=== Most penalties ===
Updated: 19 July 2025

Most penalties by a player in a year
Penalties	Player	Position	International team(s)	Year	Matches	Avg. pen (per game)	Ref
62	Neil Jenkins	Fly-half	Wales	1999	14	4.43	
45	Jonny Wilkinson	Fly-half	England	2003	14	3.21	
44	Leigh Halfpenny	Fullback	Wales (31); British and Irish Lions (13)	2013	12	3.67	
43	Neil Jenkins	Fly-half	Wales	1994	12	3.58	
42	**Handre Pollard**	Fly-half	South Africa	2021	12	3.50	
41	Andrew Mehrtens	Fly-half	New Zealand	1999	10	4.10	
40	Morne Steyn	Fly-half	South Africa	2010	13	3.08	
39	Gonzalo Quesada	Fly-half	Argentina	1999	8	4.88	
39	Jonny Wilkinson	Fly-half	England	2000	9	4.33	
38	Dan Carter	Fly-half	New Zealand	2008	15	2.53	
37	Gavin Hastings	Fullback	Scotland	1995	10	3.70	
37	Dan Carter	Fly-half	New Zealand	2006	11	3.36	
37	Leigh Halfpenny	Fly-half	Wales	2012	12	3.08	

Players currently active at international level are listed in bold; those not playing at international level but still active at club level are listed in italics.

=== Most drop goals ===
Updated: 25 October 2023

Most drop goals by a player in a year
Drop goals	Player	Position	International team(s)	Year	Matches	Avg. DG (per game)	Ref
14	Jonny Wilkinson	Fly-half	England	2003	14	1.00	
9	Dan Parks	Fly-half	Scotland	2010	9	1.00	
6	Naas Botha	Fly-half	South Africa	1980	9	0.75	
6	Jannie de Beer	Fly-half	South Africa	1999	6	1.00	
6	Jonny Wilkinson	Fly-half	England	2007	13	0.46	
5	Naas Botha	Fly-half	South Africa	1981	6	0.83	
5	Guy Laporte	Fly-half	France	1981	6	0.83	
5	Stefano Bettarello	Fly-half	Italy	1983	8	0.63	
5	Jean-Patrick Lescarboura	Fly-half	France	1984	7	0.71	
5	Hugo Porta	Fly-half	Argentina	1985	7	0.71	
5	Andrew Mehrtens	Fly-half	New Zealand	1995	8	0.63	
5	Diego Dominguez	Fly-half	Italy	2000	5	1.00	
5	Neil Jenkins	Fly-half	Wales (5); British and Irish Lions (0)	2001	5	1.00	
5	Ronan O'Gara	Fly-half	Ireland	2004	9	0.56	
5	André Pretorius	Fly-half	South Africa	2006	6	0.83	
5	Morne Steyn	Fly-half	South Africa	2009	12	0.42	

Players currently active at international level are listed in bold; those not playing at international level but still active at club level are listed in italics.

== Matches ==
=== Most points ===
Test matches that have included only Tier 1 and/or Tier 2 nations are eligible.

Most points by a player in a match
Points	Player	Position	International team(s)	Tries	Con	Pen	DG	Opp	Date
45	Simon Culhane	Fly-half	New Zealand	1	20	0	0	Japan	4 June 1995
44	Charlie Hodgson	Fly-half	England	2	14	2	0	Romania	17 November 2001
42	Mat Rogers	Wing	Australia	2	16	0	0	Namibia	25 October 2003
40	Chris Paterson	Wing	Scotland	3	11	1	0	Japan	13 November 2004
39	Matt Burke	Fly-half	Australia	3	9	2	0	Canada	29 June 1996
37	Sacha Feinberg-Mngomezulu	Fly-half	South Africa	3	8	2	0	Argentina	27 September 2025
36	Tony Brown	Fly-half	New Zealand	1	11	3	0	Italy	14 October 1999
36	Paul Grayson	Fly-half	England	0	12	4	0	Tonga	15 October 1999
36	James Pritchard	Wing	Canada	3	6	3	0	United States	12 August 2006
35	Jonny Wilkinson	Fly-half	England	1	9	4	0	Italy	17 February 2001
35	Percy Montgomery	Fullback	South Africa	1	12	2	0	Namibia	15 August 2007

Players currently active at international level are listed in bold; those not playing at international level but still active at club level are listed in italics. Players whose rows are in italics represent nations classed as Tier 2.

=== Most points on debut ===
Test matches that have included only Tier 1 and/or Tier 2 nations are eligible.

Most points by a player on debut in a match
Points	Player	Position	International team(s)	Tries	Con	Pen	DG	Opp	Date
45	Simon Culhane	Fly-half	New Zealand	1	20	0	0	Japan	4 June 1995
44	Charlie Hodgson	Fly-half	England	2	14	2	0	Romania	17 November 2001
33	Carlos Spencer	Fly-half	New Zealand	2	10	1	0	Argentina	21 June 1997
30	Tonderai Chavhanga	Wing	South Africa	6	0	0	0	Uruguay	11 June 2005
28	Andrew Mehrtens	Fly-half	New Zealand	1	7	3	0	Canada	27 April 1995
26	Moolman Olivier	Fly-half	Namibia	1	11	0	0	Portugal	21 April 1990
26	Tony Brown	Fly-half	New Zealand	0	7	4	0	Samoa	18 June 1999
24	Roger Warren	Fly-half	Samoa	0	0	8	0	Tonga	29 May 2004
23	Matthew Cooper	Fullback	New Zealand	2	6	1	0	Ireland	6 June 1992
23	Gordon Ross	Fly-half	Scotland	0	4	5	0	Tonga	10 November 2001
23	Mathieu Peluchon	Fullback	Spain	1	3	4	0	Namibia	27 November 2010

Players currently active at international level are listed in bold; those not playing at international level but still active at club level are listed in italics. Players whose rows are in italics represent nations classed as Tier 2.

=== Most tries ===
Test matches that have included only Tier 1 and/or Tier 2 nations are eligible.

Most tries by a player in a match
Tries	Player	Position	National team	Date	Opp
7	Uriel O'Farrell	Wing	Argentina	9 September 1951	Uruguay
6	Gerhard Mans	Wing	Namibia	21 April 1990	Portugal
6	Marc Ellis	Wing	New Zealand	4 June 1995	Japan
6	Tonderai Chavhanga	Wing	South Africa	11 June 2005	Uruguay
5	George Lindsay	Wing	Scotland	26 February 1887	Wales
5	Douglas Lambert	Wing	England	5 January 1907	France
5	Cornel Popescu	Wing	Romania	18 October 1986	Portugal
5	Rory Underwood	Wing	England	4 October 1989	Fiji
5	Ionel Rotaru	Wing	Romania	13 April 1996	Portugal
5	Jeff Wilson	Wing	New Zealand	14 June 1997	Fiji
5	Stefan Terblanche	Wing	South Africa	19 June 1999	Italy
5	Chris Latham	Fullback	Australia	25 October 2003	Namibia
5	Josh Lewsey	Fullback	England	2 November 2003	Uruguay
5	**Will Jordan**	Wing	New Zealand	2 July 2021	Tonga
5	**Henry Arundell**	Wing	England	23 September 2023	Chile
5	**Will Joseph**	Wing	England	14 November 2026	Japan

Players currently active at international level are listed in bold; those not playing at international level but still active at club level are listed in italics. Players whose rows are in italics represent nations classed as Tier 2, since the beginning of the professional era (August 1995), and primarily play other Tier 2, or Tier 3 nations.

=== Most tries on debut ===
Test matches that have included only Tier 1 and/or Tier 2 nations are eligible.

Most tries by a player on debut in a match
Tries	Player	Position	National team	Date	Opp
7	Uriel O'Farrell	Wing	Argentina	9 September 1951	Uruguay
6	Tonderai Chavhanga	Wing	South Africa	11 June 2005	Uruguay
5	Douglas Lambert	Wing	England	5 January 1907	France
4	Willie Llewellyn	Wing	Wales	17 January 1899	England
4	Richard Hyland	Wing	United States	11 May 1924	Romania
4	Stefan Terblanche	Wing	South Africa	13 June 1998	Ireland
4	Viliame Iongi	Wing	Tonga	8 June 2011	United States
4	Robert Lilomaiava	Wing	Samoa	9 November 2012	Canada

Players currently active at international level are listed in bold; those not playing at international level but still active at club level are listed in italics. Players whose rows are in italics represent nations classed as Tier 2, since the beginning of the professional era (August 1995), and primarily play other Tier 2, or Tier 3 nations.

=== Most conversions ===
Test matches that have included only Tier 1 and/or Tier 2 nations are eligible.

Most conversions by a player in a match
Conversions	Player	Position	National team	Date	Opp
20	Simon Culhane	Fly-half	New Zealand	4 June 1995	Japan
16	Mat Rogers	Wing	Australia	25 October 2003	Namibia
14	Charlie Hodgson	Fly-half	England	17 November 2001	Romania
14	Gavin Henson	Wing	Wales	26 November 2004	Japan
14	Nick Evans	Fly-half	New Zealand	15 September 2007	Portugal
13	Jonny Wilkinson	Fly-half	England	21 August 1999	United States
12	Virgil Popisteanu	Fly-half	Romania	13 April 1996	Portugal
12	Paul Grayson	Fly-half	England	15 October 1999	Tonga
12	Tony Brown	Fly-half	New Zealand	16 June 2000	Tonga
12	Leon MacDonald	Centre	New Zealand	24 October 2003	Tonga
12	Percy Montgomery	Fullback	South Africa	15 August 2007	Namibia
12	Jack Crowley	Fly-half	Ireland	12 July 2025	Portugal

Players currently active at international level are listed in bold; those not playing at international level but still active at club level are listed in italics. Players whose rows are in italics represent nations classed as Tier 2, since the beginning of the professional era (August 1995), and primarily play other Tier 2, or Tier 3 nations.

=== Most conversions on debut ===
Test matches that have included only Tier 1 and/or Tier 2 nations are eligible.

Most conversions by a player on debut in a match
Conversions	Player	Position	International team	Date	Opp
20	Simon Culhane	Fly-half	New Zealand	4 June 1995	Japan
14	Charlie Hodgson	Fly-half	England	17 November 2001	Romania
11	Moolman Olivier	Fly-half	Namibia	21 April 1990	Portugal
10	Carlos Spencer	Fly-half	New Zealand	21 June 1997	Argentina
8	Simon Hodgkinson	Fullback	England	13 May 1990	Romania
7	Andrew Mehrtens	Fly-half	New Zealand	27 April 1995	Canada
7	Edrich Lubbe	Centre	South Africa	10 June 1997	Tonga
7	Tony Brown	Fly-half	New Zealand	18 June 1999	Samoa
6	Grahame Parker	Fullback	England	12 February 1938	Ireland
6	Enrique Fernandez del Casal	Centre	Argentina	9 September 1951	Uruguay
6	Matthew Cooper	Fullback	New Zealand	6 June 1992	Ireland
6	Dan Carter	Centre	New Zealand	21 June 2003	Wales

Players currently active at international level are listed in bold; those not playing at international level but still active at club level are listed in italics. Players whose rows are in italics represent nations classed as Tier 2.

=== Most penalties ===
Test matches that have included only Tier 1 and/or Tier 2 nations are eligible.

Most penalties by a player in a match
Penalties	Player	Position	International team	Date	Opp
9	Keiji Hirose	Fly-half	Japan	8 May 1999	Tonga
9	Andrew Mehrtens	Fly-half	New Zealand	24 July 1999	Australia
9	Neil Jenkins	Fly-half	Wales	28 August 1999	France
9	Thierry Teixeira	Fly-half	Portugal	8 February 2000	Georgia
9	Andrew Mehrtens	Fly-half	New Zealand	11 November 2000	France
8	Santiago Mesón	Fullback	Argentina	10 March 1995	Canada
8	Gavin Hastings	Fullback	Scotland	30 May 1995	Tonga
8	Gonzalo Quesada	Fly-half	Argentina	10 October 1999	Samoa
8	Federico Todeschini	Fly-half	Argentina	17 June 2006	Wales
8	Mirco Bergamasco	Wing	Italy	27 November 2010	Fiji
8	Morne Steyn	Fly-half	South Africa	1 August 2009	New Zealand

Players currently active at international level are listed in bold; those not playing at international level but still active at club level are listed in italics. Players whose rows are in italics represent nations classed as Tier 2.

There are 14 players with 8 penalties kicked in a match to their name. For the purpose of limiting the list to a reasonable size, the players with the 5 highest match scores are shown here (listed chronologically).

=== Most penalties on debut ===
Test matches that have included only Tier 1 and/or Tier 2 nations are eligible.

Most penalties by a player on debut in a match
Penalties	Player	Position	International team	Date	Opp
8	Roger Warren	Fly-half	Samoa	29 May 2004	Tonga
6	Kieran Crowley	Fullback	New Zealand	1 June 1985	England
6	Gavin Hastings	Fly-half	Scotland	18 January 1986	France
6	Takahiro Hosokawa	Fly-half	Japan	8 April 1990	Tonga
5	Okey Geffin	Prop	South Africa	16 July 1949	New Zealand
5	Joe Karam	Fullback	New Zealand	2 December 1972	Wales
5	Shane Howarth	Fullback	New Zealand	9 July 1994	South Africa
5	Paul Grayson	Fly-half	England	16 December 1995	Samoa
5	Gordon Ross	Fly-half	Scotland	10 November 2001	Tonga
5	Rima Wakarua	Fly-half	Italy	15 October 2003	Tonga
5	Theuns Kotzé	Fly-half	Namibia	15 June 2011	Portugal

Players currently active at international level are listed in bold; those not playing at international level but still active at club level are listed in italics. Players whose rows are in italics represent nations classed as Tier 2.

=== Most drop goals ===
Test matches that have included only Tier 1 and/or Tier 2 nations are eligible.

Most drop goals by a player in a match
Drop goals	Player	Position	International team	Date	Opp
6	Konstantin Rachkov	Fly-half	Russia	16 February 2003	Spain
5	Jannie de Beer	Fly-half	South Africa	24 October 1999	England
4	André Pretorius	Fullback	South Africa	25 November 2006	England
3	Diego Dominguez	Fly-half	Italy	5 February 2000	Scotland
3	Jonny Wilkinson	Fly-half	England	16 November 2003	France
3	Neil Jenkins	Fly-half	Wales	17 February 2001	Scotland
3	Hugo Porta	Fly-half	Argentina	2 November 1985	New Zealand
3	Didier Camberabero	Fly-half	France	30 June 1990	Australia
3	Hugo Porta	Fly-half	Argentina	27 October 1979	Australia
3	Opeti Turuva	Fly-half	Fiji	2 July 1994	Samoa
3	Neculai Nichitean	Fly-half	Romania	8 April 1995	France
3	George Ford	Fly-half	England	9 September 2023	Argentina

Players currently active at international level are listed in bold; those not playing at international level but still active at club level are listed in italics. Players whose rows are in italics represent nations classed as Tier 2.

There are 18 players with 3 drop goals kicked in a match to their name. For the purpose of limiting the list to a reasonable size, the players with the 8 highest match scores are shown here (listed chronologically).

=== Most drop goals on debut ===
Test matches that have included only Tier 1 and/or Tier 2 nations are eligible.

Most drop goals by a player on debut in a match
Drop goals	Player	Position	International team	Date	Opp
2	Robert Campbell MacKenzie	Centre	Scotland	19 February 1877	Ireland
2	Guy Laporte	Fly-half	France	7 February 1981	Ireland
2	Rob Andrew	Fly-half	England	5 January 1985	Romania
2	David Knox	Fly-half	Australia	10 August 1985	Fiji
2	Frano Botica	Fly-half	New Zealand	28 June 1986	France

Players currently active at international level are listed in bold; those not playing at international level but still active at club level are listed in italics. Players whose rows are in italics represent nations classed as Tier 2.

== See also ==
- International rugby union team records
- Records and statistics of the Rugby World Cup
- List of international rugby union teams
