= International rugby union team records =

These are men's team records in international rugby, updated at the conclusion of the November Internationals window each year.

To view men's individual records, see International rugby union player records. To view records of the men's Rugby World Cup, see Records and statistics of the Rugby World Cup.

Men's World Rugby Rankings Top 20 as of 16 November 2026
Rank	Change (Note: Change from the previous week)	Team	Points
1	Steady	South Africa	91.53
2	Steady	New Zealand	90.65
3	▲1	France	89.05
4	▼1	Ireland	88.70
5	Steady	England	86.99
6	Steady	Scotland	85.28
7	Steady	Australia	82.24
8	Steady	Argentina	82.09
9	▲1	Wales	79.37
10	▼1	Fiji	77.79
11	Steady	Italy	75.84
12	Steady	Japan	75.25
13	Steady	Georgia	74.23
14	▲1	United States	68.39
15	▼1	Portugal	68.24
16	▲3	Samoa	67.60
17	▲1	Chile	67.00
18	▼2	Spain	66.53
19	▼2	Tonga	65.58
20	Steady	Uruguay	65.17

Source: World Rugby
Graph updated to 16 November 2026
World Rugby Ranking leaders

== Team ==
=== World Rankings ===
==== Highest rankings ====
Below is a list of the best and worst ranking positions for all nations who have ever been ranked among the top ten, since the ranking tables were first published on the 13 October 2003:

Team	Best		Worst	
Team	Rank	Year(s)	Rank	Year(s)
New Zealand	1	2003, 2004–07, 2008, 2008-2009, 2009–19, 2019, 2021, 2025, 2026	5	2022
South Africa	1	2007–08, 2008, 2009, 2019–21, 2021-22, 2023–24, 2024–25, 2025-2026	7	2017, 2018
England	1	2003, 2003–04, 2019	8	2009, 2015–16, 2023
Ireland	1	2019, 2022–23, 2024	9	2013
France	1	2022	10	2018, 2019
Wales	1	2019	14	2025
Australia	2	2003, 2004–05, 2007, 2008, 2010, 2011–12, 2015–16	10	2023, 2024
Argentina	3	2007–08	12	2014
Scotland	5	2017, 2017–18, 2018, 2023	12	2012, 2013, 2015
Fiji	7	2023	16	2011–2012
Samoa	7	2012–2013	20	2026
Japan	7	2019	20	2003–2004, 2006
Italy	8	2007, 2024	15	2015, 2017, 2018, 2019, 2020, 2021
Tonga	9	2011–2012	20	2005–2006

==== Most World Ranking points ====
Below is a list of the Top 10 most accumulated ranking points and corresponding fewest ranking points, since the ranking tables were first published on 13 October 2003.

Team	Most		Fewest	
Team	Rating points	Date achieved	Rating points	Date achieved
New Zealand	96.57	10 October 2016	85.79	29 August 2022
South Africa	95.09	14 September 2026	80.63	20 October 2003
England	93.99	24 November 2003	77.79	17 September 2007
Ireland	93.79	25 September 2023	77.25	16 June 2008
Australia	91.75	26 October 2015	76.50	25 September 2023
France	90.59	11 September 2023	77.02	4 February 2019
Wales	89.96	18 March 2019	72.65	7 July 2025
Argentina	87.45	22 October 2007	73.97	23 June 2014
Scotland	84.43	26 February 2018	72.91	14 November 2005
Japan	82.08	14 October 2019	61.42	3 November 2003

==== Longest tenure ranked at No. 1 ====
England were ranked as No. 1 when the rankings were introduced in late 2003. New Zealand hold the record for the longest run as the No. 1 world ranked team, spending just less than three months short of 10 years uninterrupted atop the rankings. South Africa currently top the world rankings. Not shown on the table, but the other nations to have been ranked No. 1, are Wales, spending two weeks in the top spot in 2019, before relinquishing the No. 1 spot to New Zealand, and France, who held No. 1 for a week in 2022. Tenures are correct as of the last ranking update on 8 September 2025.

Tenures at No. 1
Tenure	Team	Start	Matches	End	Last match	Preceded by	Succeeded by
3563d (9y9m3d)	New Zealand	16 November 2009	128	19 August 2019	36–0 Australia	South Africa	Wales
1225d (3y4m8d)	New Zealand	14 June 2004	47	22 October 2007	18–20 France	England	South Africa
658d (1y9m19d)^{1}^{2}	South Africa	4 November 2019	5	18 September 2021	17–30 Australia	England	New Zealand
455d (1y2m28d)	Ireland	18 July 2022	16	16 October 2023	24–28 New Zealand	France	South Africa
343d (11m9d)	New Zealand	18 August 2008	16	27 July 2009	19–28 South Africa	South Africa	South Africa
343d (11m7d)	South Africa	16 October 2023	11	23 September 2024	28–29 Argentina	Ireland	Ireland
280d (9m7d)	South Africa	4 October 2021	5	11 July 2022	12–13 Wales	New Zealand	France
280d (9m7d)	South Africa	11 November 2024	5	18 August 2025	22–38 Australia	Ireland	New Zealand
259d (8m15d)	South Africa	22 October 2007	5	7 July 2008	8–19 New Zealand	New Zealand	New Zealand
210d (6m28d)	England	17 November 2003	7	14 June 2004	3–36 New Zealand	New Zealand	New Zealand

Nations in bold indicate the tenure is ongoing.

- **^1**South Africa did not play any matches in the 2020 calendar year due to complications faced with preparation and travel as a result of the COVID-19 pandemic.
- **^2**Amongst South Africa's matches in their 2019-2021 tenure at No. 1 are three matches against British & Irish Lions, which do not affect ranking points.

Key: y = years, m = months, d = days.

==== Most matches played ranked at No. 1 ====
New Zealand hold the record for the most matches played whilst defending the No. 1 World Ranking, playing 128 matches during that time. South Africa currently top the world rankings. Not shown on the table, but the other nations to have been ranked No. 1, are Wales, spending two weeks in the top spot in 2019, before relinquishing the No. 1 spot to New Zealand, and France who held No. 1 for a week in 2022. Tenures are correct as of 27 January 2025.

Matches at No. 1
Matches	Team	Start	Tenure	End	Last match	Preceded by	Succeeded by
128	New Zealand	16 November 2009	3563d (9y9m3d)	19 August 2019	36–0 Australia	South Africa	Wales
47	New Zealand	14 June 2004	1225d (3y4m8d)	22 October 2007	18–20 France	England	South Africa
16	Ireland	18 July 2022	455d (1y2m28d)	16 October 2023	24–28 New Zealand	France	South Africa
16	New Zealand	18 August 2008	343d (11m9d)	27 July 2009	19–28 South Africa	South Africa	South Africa
11	South Africa	16 October 2023	343d (11m7d)	23 September 2024	28–29 Argentina	Ireland	Ireland
7	England	17 November 2003	210d (6m28d)	14 June 2004	3–36 New Zealand	New Zealand	New Zealand
6	South Africa	27 July 2009	112d (3m20d)	16 November 2009	13–20 France	New Zealand	New Zealand

Nations in bold indicate the tenure is ongoing.

Key: y = years, m = months, d = days.

=== All-time ===
==== Most matches ====
Most tests played
Matches	Team	Debut	Wins	Lost	Drawn	%
840	France	1906	467	339	34	55.6%
818	England	1871	457	309	52	55.87%
813	Wales	1881	409	374	30	50.31%
773	Ireland	1875	373	368	32	48.25%
770	Scotland	1871	341	396	33	44.29%
711	Australia	1899	352	337	22	49.51%
664	New Zealand	1903	509	132	23	76.66%
575	Italy	1929	209	351	15	36.35%
569	South Africa	1891	365	180	24	64.15%
515	Argentina	1929	257	244	14	49.9%

Nations in italics are classed as Tier 2 since the beginning of the professional era (Aug. 1995), and primarily play other Tier 2 nations.
Up to date as of 15 March 2026

==== Most wins ====
Most tests won
Wins	Team	Debut	Matches	Lost	Drawn	%
509	New Zealand	1903	664	132	23	76.66%
467	France	1906	840	339	34	55.6%
457	England	1871	818	309	52	55.87%
409	Wales	1881	813	374	30	50.31%
373	Ireland	1875	773	368	32	48.25%
365	South Africa	1891	569	180	24	64.15%
352	Australia	1899	711	337	22	49.51%
341	Scotland	1871	770	396	33	44.29%
282	Romania	1919	509	215	12	55.4%
257	Argentina	1929	515	244	14	49.9%

Nations in italics are classed as Tier 2 since the beginning of the professional era (Aug. 1995), and primarily play other Tier 2 nations.
Up to date as of 15 March 2026

==== Most points ====
Most team points
Points	Team	Debut	Matches	Aga	Diff	PPM	PAPM
19,035	New Zealand	1903	664	9,276	+9,759	28.67	13.97
16,431	France	1906	831	13,329	+3,102	19.56	15.87
15,146	Australia	1899	711	13,270	+1,876	21.3	18.66
15,079	England	1871	818	11,056	+4,023	18.43	13.52
14,513	Wales	1881	813	13,400	+1,113	17.85	16.48
14,213	Argentina	1910	515	11,030	+3,183	27.6	21.42
13,918	South Africa	1891	569	9,273	+4,645	24.46	16.3
12,923	Ireland	1875	773	11,192	+1,731	16.72	14.48
12,020	Scotland	1871	770	12,073	-53	15.61	15.68
11,422	Romania	1919	509	9,925	+1,497	22.44	19.5

Nations in italics are classed as Tier 2 since the beginning of the professional era (Aug. 1995), and primarily play other Tier 2 nations.
Up to date as of 15 March 2026

==== Most consecutive wins ====
Most consecutive team wins
Wins	Team	First	Opp	Last	Opp	End	Score	Opp
24	Cyprus	20 November 2008	Azerbaijan	1 November 2014	Andorra	15 November 2014	20–39	Latvia
18	New Zealand	15 August 2015	Australia	22 October 2016	Australia	5 November 2016	29–40	Ireland
18	England	10 October 2015	Uruguay	11 March 2017	Scotland	18 March 2017	9–13	Ireland
17	Ireland	9 July 2022	New Zealand	07 October 2023	Scotland	14 October 2023	24–28	New Zealand
17	New Zealand	18 September 1965	South Africa	14 June 1969	Wales	25 May 1970	6–17	South Africa
17	South Africa	23 August 1997	Australia	28 November 1998	Ireland	5 December 1998	7–13	England
17	New Zealand	8 June 2013	France	21 June 2014	England	4 October 2014	25–27	South Africa
17	Lithuania	28 October 2006	Norway	24 April 2010	Serbia	8 May 2010	16–27	Ukraine
16	New Zealand	9 September 2011	Tonga	06 October 2012	South Africa	20 October 2012	18–18	Australia
15	South Africa	8 October 1994	Argentina	02 July 1996	Fiji	13 July 1996	16–21	Australia
15	New Zealand	13 August 2005	Australia	26 August 2006	South Africa	2 September 2006	20–21	South Africa
15	New Zealand	19 September 2009	Australia	11 September 2010	Australia	30 October 2010	24–26	Australia

Nations in italics are classed as Tier 2 or Tier 3 since the beginning of the professional era (Aug. 1995), and primarily play other Tier 2 or 3 nations.

==== Most consecutive wins by a Tier I nation ====
Most consecutive team wins by a Tier I nation
Wins	Team	First	Opp	Last	Opp	End	Score	Opp
18	New Zealand	15 August 2015	Australia	22 October 2016	Australia	5 November 2016	29–40	Ireland
18	England	10 October 2015	Uruguay	11 March 2017	Scotland	18 March 2017	9–13	Ireland
17	New Zealand	18 September 1965	South Africa	14 June 1969	Wales	25 May 1970	6–17	South Africa
17	South Africa	23 August 1997	Australia	28 November 1998	Ireland	5 December 1998	7–13	England
17	New Zealand	8 June 2013	France	21 June 2014	England	4 October 2014	25–27	South Africa
17	Ireland	9 July 2022	New Zealand	07 October 2023	Scotland	14 October 2023	24–28	New Zealand
16	New Zealand	9 September 2011	Tonga	06 October 2012	South Africa	20 October 2012	18–18	Australia
15	South Africa	8 October 1994	Argentina	02 July 1996	Fiji	13 July 1996	16–21	Australia
15	New Zealand	13 August 2005	Australia	26 August 2006	South Africa	2 September 2006	20–21	South Africa
15	New Zealand	19 September 2009	Australia	11 September 2010	Australia	30 October 2010	24–26	Australia

==== Most consecutive matches without loss ====
Most consecutive team matches without loss
Matches	Team	First	Opp	Draw	Score	Opp	End	Score	Opp
24	Cyprus	20 November 2008	Azerbaijan	—N/a	—N/a	—N/a	15 November 2014	20–39	Latvia
23	New Zealand	22 May 1987	Italy	16 July 1988	19–19	Australia	18 August 1990	9–21	Australia
22	New Zealand	8 June 2013	France	16 August 2014	12–12	Australia	4 October 2014	25–27	South Africa
20	New Zealand	9 September 2011	Tonga	20 October 2012	18–18	Australia	1 December 2012	21–38	England
18	New Zealand	15 August 2015	Australia	—N/a	—N/a	—N/a	5 November 2016	29–40	Ireland
18	England	10 October 2015	Uruguay	—N/a	—N/a	—N/a	18 March 2017	9–13	Ireland
17	New Zealand^{2}	22 July 1961	France	25 August 1962/ 18 January 1964	9–9/ 0–0	Australia/ Scotland	29 August 1964	5–20	Australia
17	New Zealand	18 September 1965	South Africa	—N/a	—N/a	—N/a	25 May 1970	6–17	South Africa
17	South Africa	23 August 1997	Australia	—N/a	—N/a	—N/a	5 December 1998	7–13	England
17	Lithuania	28 October 2006	Norway	—N/a	—N/a	—N/a	8 May 2010	16–27	Ukraine
17	Ireland	9 July 2022	New Zealand	—N/a	—N/a	—N/a	14 October 2023	24–28	New Zealand

Nations in italics are classed as Tier 2 or Tier 3 since the beginning of the professional era (Aug. 1995), and primarily play other Tier 2 or 3 nations.
^2New Zealand recorded multiple draws in its unbeaten run, as shown.

==== Most consecutive matches without loss by a Tier I nation ====
Most consecutive team matches without loss by a Tier I nation
Matches	Team	First	Opp	Draw	Score	Opp	End	Score	Opp
23	New Zealand	22 May 1987	Italy	16 July 1988	19–19	Australia	18 August 1990	9–21	Australia
22	New Zealand	8 June 2013	France	16 August 2014	12–12	Australia	4 October 2014	25–27	South Africa
20	New Zealand	9 September 2011	Tonga	20 October 2012	18–18	Australia	1 December 2012	21–38	England
18	New Zealand	15 August 2015	Australia	—N/a	—N/a	—N/a	5 November 2016	29–40	Ireland
18	England	10 October 2015	Uruguay	—N/a	—N/a	—N/a	18 March 2017	9–13	Ireland
17	New Zealand^{2}	22 July 1961	France	25 August 1962; 18 January 1964	9–9; 0–0	Australia; Scotland	29 August 1964	5–20	Australia
17	New Zealand	18 September 1965	South Africa	—N/a	—N/a	—N/a	25 May 1970	6–17	South Africa
17	South Africa	23 August 1997	Australia	—N/a	—N/a	—N/a	5 December 1998	7–13	England
17	Ireland	9 July 2022	New Zealand	—N/a	—N/a	—N/a	14 October 2023	24–28	New Zealand
16	South Africa	6 August 1994	New Zealand	08 October 1994	18–18	New Zealand	13 July 1996	16–21	Australia

^2New Zealand and ^3South Africa both recorded multiple draws in their unbeaten runs, as shown.

==== Most consecutive matches without a win ====
Most consecutive team matches without a win
Matches	Team	First	Opp	End	Opp
27	Singapore	22 November 1982	Korea	16 July 1997	Latvia
19	Samoa	4 June 1955	Fiji Warriors	1975	Tonga
18	Wales	14 October 2023	Argentina	5 July 2025	Japan
18	France	28 January 1911	England	17 February 1920	Wales
18	Azerbaijan	29 October 2005	Norway	TBD	TBD
17	Scotland	24 February 1951	Ireland	8 January 1955	France
17	Paraguay	16 July 1983	Uruguay	19 August 1991	Chile
16	Japan	9 February 1936	New Zealand Universities	4 October 1959	Oxford & Cambridge
16	Czech Republic	12 November 2005	Russia	19 April 2008	Russia
16	Italy	4 October 2019	South Africa	13 November 2021	Argentina

Nations in italics were classed as Tier 2 or Tier 3 at the time of their losing streak, and primarily played other Tier 2 or 3 nations.

==== Most consecutive matches without a win by a tier I nation ====
Most consecutive team matches without a win by a Tier I nation
Matches	Team	First	Opp	End	Opp
18	Wales	14 October 2023	Argentina	5 July 2025	Japan
18	France	28 January 1911	England	17 February 1920	Wales
17	Scotland	24 February 1951	Ireland	8 January 1955	France
16	Italy	4 October 2019	South Africa	13 November 2021	Argentina
14	France	18 May 1924	United States	26 February 1927	Wales
13	Ireland	28 January 1882	Wales	20 February 1886	Scotland
13	Scotland	5 March 1977	France	2 February 1980	Ireland
13	Italy	8 November 2008	Australia	13 November 2009	South Africa
12	Australia	22 July 1899	(British & Irish Lions) British Lions	12 December 1908	Wales
12	France	1 January 1906	New Zealand	28 March 1910	Ireland

==== Highest match attendance ====
Top 10 highest attendances
Attendance	Stadium	Country	Team 1	Result	Team 2	Date	Ref.
109,874	ANZ Stadium	Sydney, Australia	Australia	35–39	New Zealand	15 July 2000	
107,042	ANZ Stadium	Sydney, Australia	Australia	28–7	New Zealand	28 August 1999	
104,000	Murrayfield Stadium	Edinburgh, Scotland	Scotland	12–10	Wales	1 March 1975	
95,000	Dinamo Stadion	Bucharest, Romania	Romania	15–18	France	19 May 1957	
94,713	FNB Stadium	Johannesburg, South Africa	South Africa	22–29	New Zealand	21 August 2010	
90,978	ANZ Stadium	Sydney, Australia	Australia	29–26	New Zealand	1 September 2001	
90,307	Melbourne Cricket Ground	Melbourne, Australia	Australia	26–29	British and Irish Lions	26 July 2025	
90,119	Melbourne Cricket Ground	Melbourne, Australia	Australia	18–33	New Zealand	26 July 1997	
103,000	Ellis Park	Johannesburg, South Africa	South Africa	22–23	British and Irish Lions	6 August 1955	
89,267	Wembley Stadium	London, England	Ireland	44–10	Romania	27 September 2015	
89,019	Wembley Stadium	London, England	Argentina	16–26	New Zealand	20 September 2015	

=== Rugby World Cup ===
==== RWC titles ====
Most titles won
Team	Titles	Tournaments	%
South Africa	4	1995, 2007, 2019, 2023	50% (RSA did not play in 1987 & 1991 World Cups)
New Zealand	3	1987, 2011, 2015	30%
Australia	2	1991, 1999	20%
England	1	2003	10%

==== RWC tournament points ====
Most points by a team in a single tournament
Points	Team	Tournament	Matches	Won	Lost	Draw	Diff	PPG
361	New Zealand	2003	7	6	1	0	+260	51.6
345	Australia	2003	7	6	1	0	+267	49.3
327	New Zealand	1995	6	5	1	0	+208	54.5
327	England	2003	7	7	0	0	+239	46.7
327	New Zealand	2007	5	4	1	0	+272	65.4
301	New Zealand	2011	7	7	0	0	+229	43.0
298	New Zealand	1987	6	6	0	0	+246	49.7

==== RWC tournament tries ====
Most tries by a team in a single tournament
Tries	Team	Tournament	Matches	TPG
52	New Zealand	2003	7	7.4
48	New Zealand	2007	5	9.6
43	New Zealand	1987	6	7.2
43	Australia	2003	7	6.1
41	New Zealand	1995	6	6.8
40	New Zealand	2011	7	5.7

==== RWC tournament conversions ====
Most conversions by a team in a single tournament
Conversions	Team	Tournament	Matches	CPG
40	New Zealand	2003	7	5.7
36	New Zealand	2007	5	7.2
34	New Zealand	1995	6	5.7
32	Australia	2003	7	4.6
30	New Zealand	1987	6	5.0

==== RWC tournament penalties ====
Most penalties by a team in a single tournament
Penalties	Team	Tournament	Matches	PPG
32	Argentina	1999	5	6.4
26	France	1995	6	4.3
26	England	1999	5	5.2
25	England	1995	6	4.2
25	South Africa	2015	7	3.6
23	England	2003	7	3.3
22	New Zealand	1999	6	3.7
22	France	2003	7	3.1

==== RWC tournament drop goals ====
Most drop goals by a team in a single tournament
Drop goals	Team	Tournament	Matches	DGPG
8	South Africa	1999	6	1.3
8	England	2003	7	1.1
5	England	2023	7	0.7
5	England	2007	7	0.7
4	Fiji	1991	3	1.3
4	England	1995	6	0.7
4	New Zealand	1995	6	0.7
4	France	2003	7	0.6
4	Argentina	2007	7	0.6
4	Scotland	2011	4	1.0

==== RWC match margins ====
Biggest winning margins
Margin	Team	Opponent	Score	Date
142	Australia	Namibia	142–0	24 October 2003
128	New Zealand	Japan	145–17	4 June 1995
98	New Zealand	Italy	101–3	14 October 1999
98	England	Uruguay	111–13	2 November 2003
96	France	Namibia	96–0	21 September 2023
95	New Zealand	Portugal	108–13	15 September 2007

==== RWC match points ====
Most points by a team in a single match
Points	Team	Opponent	Score	Date
145	New Zealand	Japan	145–17	4 June 1995
142	Australia	Namibia	142–0	24 October 2003
111	England	Uruguay	111–13	2 November 2003
108	New Zealand	Portugal	108–13	15 September 2007
101	New Zealand	Italy	101–3	14 October 1999
101	England	Tonga	101–10	15 October 1999

==== RWC match tries ====
Most tries by a team in a single match
Tries	Team	Opponent	Score	Date
22	Australia	Namibia	142–0	24 October 2003
21	New Zealand	Japan	145–17	4 June 1995
17	England	Uruguay	111–13	2 November 2003
16	New Zealand	Portugal	108–13	15 September 2007
14	New Zealand	Italy	101–3	14 October 1999

==== RWC match conversions ====
Most conversions by a team in a single match
Conversions	Team	Opponent	Score	Date
20	New Zealand	Japan	145–17	4 June 1995
16	Australia	Namibia	142–0	24 October 2003
14	New Zealand	Portugal	108–13	15 September 2007
13	New Zealand	Tonga	91–7	24 October 2003
13	England	Uruguay	111–13	2 November 2003
12	England	Tonga	101–10	15 October 1999
12	South Africa	Namibia	87–0	22 September 2011

==== RWC match penalties ====
Most penalties by a team in a single match
Penalties	Team	Opponent	Score	Date
8	Scotland	Tonga	41–5	30 May 1995
8	France	Ireland	36–12	10 June 1995
8	Argentina	Samoa	32–16	10 October 1999
8	Australia	South Africa	27–21	30 October 1999
7	Argentina	Japan	33–12	16 October 1999
7	England	Fiji	45–24	20 October 1999
7	Argentina	Ireland	28–24	20 October 1999
7	Ireland	Argentina	24–28	20 October 1999
7	England	South Africa	21–44	24 October 1999
7	Australia	France	35–12	6 November 1999
7	New Zealand	Argentina	33–10	9 October 2011
7	Wales	England	28–25	26 September 2015

==== RWC match drop goals ====
Most drop goals by a team in a single match
Drop goals	Team	Opponent	Score	Date
5	South Africa	England	44–21	24 October 1999
3	Fiji	Romania	15–17	12 October 1991
3	England	France	24–7	16 November 2003
3	Argentina	Ireland	30–15	30 September 2007
3	Namibia	Fiji	25–49	10 September 2011
3	England	Argentina	27–10	9 September 2023

=== Calendar year ===
==== Most wins ====
Teams that have played Tier 1 sides in 50% or more of their test matches in that year are eligible.

Most wins in a calendar year
Wins	Team	Year	Matches	Lost	Draw	%
16	England	2003	17	1	0	94%
14	South Africa	2007	17	3	0	82%
14	New Zealand	2013	14	0	0	100%
13	New Zealand	2008	15	2	0	87%
13	New Zealand	2010	14	1	0	93%
13	New Zealand	2016	14	1	0	93%
13	England	2016	13	0	0	100%

New Zealand, England and France are the only three Tier 1 nations to complete a calendar year with a 100% win rate in the professional era (Aug. 1995-present).

==== Most points ====
Teams that have played Tier 1 sides in 50% or more of their test matches in that year are eligible.

Most points in a calendar year
Points	Team	Year	Matches	Aga	Diff	PPG
658	South Africa	2007	17	257	+401	38.7
644	England	2003	17	201	+443	37.9
602	New Zealand	2003	14	201	+395	43.0
594	New Zealand	2007	12	148	+446	49.5
584	New Zealand	1995	12	205	+379	48.7

==== Most tries ====
Teams that have played Tier 1 sides in 50% or more of their test matches in that year are eligible.

Most tries in a calendar year
Tries	Team	Year	Matches	TPG
81	New Zealand	2003	14	5.8
81	South Africa	2007	17	4.8
81	South Africa	2025	14	5.8
81	New Zealand	2016	14	5.7
78	New Zealand	2018	14	5.6
74	South Africa	1997	13	5.7
72	New Zealand	1997	12	6.0
71	New Zealand	1995	12	5.9
70	England	2001	11	6.4
68	England	2003	17	4.0

==== Most conversions ====
Teams that have played Tier 1 sides in 50% or more of their test matches in that year are eligible.

Most conversions in a calendar year
Conversions	Team	Year	Matches	CPG
62	South Africa	2007	17	3.7
60	New Zealand	2016	14	4.3
58	New Zealand	2003	14	4.1
58	New Zealand	2007	12	4.8
57	New Zealand	2018	14	4.1
54	South Africa	1997	13	4.2
53	New Zealand	1995	12	4.4
53	New Zealand	1997	12	4.4
53	England	2003	17	3.1
53	New Zealand	2017	14	3.8
49	New Zealand	2019	11	4.5
49	England	2019	15	3.3

==== Most penalties ====
Teams that have played Tier 1 sides in 50% or more of their test matches in that year are eligible.

Most penalties in a calendar year
Penalties	Team	Year	Matches	PPG
62	Wales	1999	14	4.4
56	New Zealand	2009	14	4.0
52	Australia	2012	15	3.5
51	England	2003	17	3.0
51	France	2003	18	2.8
49	France	2007	17	2.9
48	New Zealand	1999	12	4.0
48	England	2007	17	2.8
47	England	1995	12	3.6
46	Wales	1994	13	3.5
46	South Africa	2010	14	3.3

==== Most drop goals ====
Teams that have played Tier 1 sides in 50% or more of their test matches in that year are eligible.

Most drop goals in a calendar year
Drop goals	Team	Year	Matches	DGPG
15	England	2003	17	0.9
11	France	1967	12	0.9
9	France	1981	9	1.0
9	Scotland	2010	10	0.9
8	France	1958	8	1.0
8	France	1968	12	0.7
8	Romania	1995	10	0.8
8	South Africa	1999	13	0.6
8	England	2007	17	0.5
7	France	1960	9	0.8
7	France	1961	11	0.6
7	Argentina	1971	8	0.9
7	Argentina	1979	8	0.9
7	France	1993	10	0.7
7	France	2003	18	0.4

Nations highlighted in italics are classed as Tier 2 in the professional era (Aug. 1995–present)

=== Matches ===
Team records within test matches.

==== Most points ====
Test matches that have included only Tier 1 nations and/or Tier 2 nations are eligible.

Highest points scored by one team
Pnts	Team	Score	Opp	Tries	Con	Pen	Date
145	New Zealand	145–17	Japan	21	20	0	4 June 1995
142	Australia	142–0	Namibia	22	16	0	25 October 2003
134	England	134–0	Romania	20	14	2	17 November 2001
134	South Africa	134–3	Uruguay	21	13	1	11 June 2005
111	England	111–13	Uruguay	17	13	0	2 November 2003
110	England	110–0	Netherlands	16	15	0	14 November 1998
108	New Zealand	108–13	Portugal	16	14	0	15 September 2007
106	Ireland	106–7	Portugal	16	12	0	12 July 2025
106	England	106–8	United States	16	13	0	21 August 1999

==== Most tries ====
Test matches that have included only Tier 1 nations and/or Tier 2 nations are eligible.

Most tries scored by one team
Tries	Team	Score	Opp	Date
22	Australia	142–0	Namibia	25 October 2003
21	New Zealand	145–17	Japan	4 June 1995
21	South Africa	134–3	Uruguay	11 June 2005
20	England	134–0	Romania	17 November 2001
17	England	111–13	Uruguay	2 November 2003
16	Ireland	106–7	Portugal	12 July 2025
16	New Zealand	108–13	Portugal	15 September 2007
16	England	106–8	United States	21 August 1999
16	Wales	102–11	Portugal	18 May 1994
16	New Zealand	102–0	Tonga	03 July 2021
15	South Africa	105–13	Namibia	15 August 2007

==== Most conversions ====
Test matches that have included only Tier 1 nations and/or Tier 2 nations are eligible.

Most conversions scored by one team
Con	Team	Score	Opp	Date
20	New Zealand	145–17	Japan	4 June 1995
16	Australia	142–0	Namibia	25 October 2003
14	England	134–0	Romania	17 November 2001
14	New Zealand	108–13	Portugal	15 September 2007
14	Wales	98–0	Japan	26 November 2004
13	South Africa	134–3	Uruguay	11 June 2005
13	England	111–13	Uruguay	2 November 2003
13	England	106–8	United States	21 August 1999
13	South Africa	101–0	Italy	19 June 1999
13	New Zealand	101–14	Samoa	3 September 2008
13	New Zealand	91–7	Tonga	24 October 2003

==== Most penalties ====
Test matches that have included only Tier 1 nations and/or Tier 2 nations are eligible.

Most penalties scored by one team
Con	Team	Score	Opp	Date
9	Japan	44–17	Tonga	8 May 1999
9	New Zealand	39–26	France	11 November 2000
9	New Zealand	34–15	Australia	24 July 1999
9	Wales	34–23	France	28 August 1999
9	Georgia	32–30	Portugal	8 February 2000
8	Argentina	45–27	Wales	17 June 2006
8	Scotland	41–5	Tonga	30 May 1995
8	France	36–12	Ireland	10 June 1995
8	Argentina	32–16	Samoa	10 October 1999
8	South Africa	31–19	New Zealand	1 August 2009

- There are 18 Nations that have recorded 8 penalties in a Test Match. For the purpose of limiting the list to a reasonable size, the matches with the five highest scores by the team recording 8 penalties are shown here.

==== Most drop goals ====
Test matches that have included only Tier 1 nations and/or Tier 2 nations are eligible.

Most drop goals scored by one team
DG	Team	Score	Opp	Date
5	South Africa	44–21	England	24 October 1999
4	South Africa	25–14	England	25 November 2006
4	Argentina	18–13	France	22 November 2014
3	Australia	52–28	Fiji	10 August 1985
3	South Africa	45–10	Scotland	27 November 2004
3	Russia	38–13	Portugal	7 April 2002
3	Italy	34–20	Scotland	5 February 2000
3	Argentina	30–15	Uruguay	21 September 1975
3	Argentina	30–15	Ireland	30 September 2007
3	Italy	29–21	Romania	7 October 1990

- There are 37 instances that Nations have recorded 3 drop goals in a Test Match. For the purpose of limiting the list to a reasonable size, the matches with the seven highest scores by the team recording 3 drop goals are shown here.

==== Most aggregate points ====
Test matches that have included only Tier 1 nations and/or Tier 2 nations are eligible.

Highest total match points scored
Pnts	Team 1	Score	Team 2	Tries	Con	Pen	DG	Date
162	New Zealand	145–17	Japan	23	22	1	0	4 June 1995
142	Australia	142-0	Namibia	22	16	0	0	25 October 2003
137	South Africa	134–3	Uruguay	21	13	2	0	11 June 2005
134	England	134–0	Romania	20	14	2	0	17 November 2001
124	England	111–13	Uruguay	18	14	2	0	2 November 2003
121	New Zealand	108–13	Portugal	17	15	1	1	15 September 2007
118	South Africa	105–13	Namibia	16	13	4	0	15 August 2007
115	New Zealand	101–14	Samoa	17	15	0	0	3 September 2008
114	England	106–8	United States	17	13	1	0	21 August 1999
113	Wales	102–11	Portugal	17	11	2	0	18 May 1994
113	Portugal	7–106	Ireland	17	14	0	0	12 July 2025
112	Italy	104–8	Czech Republic	17	12	1	0	18 May 1994
112	Spain	22–90	Samoa	16	13	2	0	21 November 2026

==== Most aggregate tries ====
Test matches that have included only Tier 1 nations and/or Tier 2 nations are eligible.

Most total tries scored
Tries	Team 1	T1 try	Score	T2 try	Team 2	Date
23	New Zealand	21	145–17	2	Japan	4 June 1995
22	Australia	22	142–0	0	Namibia	25 October 2003
21	South Africa	21	134–3	0	Uruguay	11 June 2005
20	England	20	134–0	0	Romania	17 November 2001
18	England	17	111–13	1	Uruguay	2 November 2003
17	New Zealand	16	108–13	1	Portugal	15 September 2007
17	England	16	106–8	1	United States	21 August 1999
17	Wales	16	102–11	1	Portugal	18 May 1994
17	South Africa	15	105–13	2	Namibia	15 August 2007
17	New Zealand	15	101–14	2	Samoa	3 September 2008
17	Ireland	16	106–7	1	Portugal	12 July 2025

==== Most aggregate conversions ====
Test matches that have included only Tier 1 nations and/or Tier 2 nations are eligible.

Most total conversions scored
Con	Team 1	T1 con	Score	T2 con	Team 2	Date
22	New Zealand	20	145–17	2	Japan	4 June 1995
16	Australia	16	142–0	0	Namibia	25 October 2003
15	New Zealand	14	108–13	1	Portugal	15 September 2007
15	New Zealand	13	101–14	2	Samoa	3 September 2008
14	England	14	134–0	0	Romania	17 November 2001
14	Wales	14	98–0	0	Japan	26 November 2004
14	England	13	111–13	1	Uruguay	2 November 2003
14	New Zealand	13	91–7	1	Tonga	24 October 2003
13	South Africa	13	134–3	0	Uruguay	11 June 2005
13	South Africa	13	101–0	0	Italy	19 June 1999
13	England	12	106–8	1	United States	21 August 1999
13	South Africa	12	105–13	1	Namibia	15 August 2007
13	England	12	101–10	1	Tonga	15 October 1999
13	Australia	12	91–10	1	Spain	1 November 2001
13	New Zealand	9	66–23	4	Ireland	12 June 2010
13	Ireland	12	106–7	1	Portugal	12 July 2025

==== Most aggregate penalties ====
Test matches that have included only Tier 1 nations and/or Tier 2 nations are eligible.

Most total penalties scored
Pen	Team 1	T1 pen	Score	T2 pen	Team 2	Date
14	Australia	8	27–21	6	South Africa	30 October 1999
14	Argentina	7	54–28	7	Canada	22 August 1998
14	Argentina	7	28–24	7	Ireland	20 October 1999
13	New Zealand	9	39–26	4	France	11 November 2000
13	Argentina	8	29–18	5	Georgia	26 June 2013
13	England	8	27–22	5	South Africa	24 June 2000
13	Spain	7	38–37	6	Namibia	17 November 2012
13	Argentina	7	35–21	6	Italy	11 June 2005
13	Wales	7	28–18	6	Scotland	9 March 2013
12	Wales	9	34–23	3	France	28 August 1999
12	Wales	7	28–25	5	England	26 September 2015
12	England	7	21–44	5	South Africa	24 October 1999
12	Wales	6	32–21	6	Canada	16 November 2002
12	France	6	32–23	6	South Africa	16 June 2001

- There are 14 instances where 12 penalties have been recorded in a test match. For the purpose of limiting the list to a reasonable size, the five highest total-scoring matches are shown here.

==== Most aggregate drop goals ====
Test matches that have included only Tier 1 nations and/or Tier 2 nations are eligible.

Most total drop goals scored
DG	Team 1	T1 DG	Score	T2 DG	Team 2	Date
6	New Zealand	3	18–9	3	France	28 June 1986
5	South Africa	5	44–21	0	England	24 October 1999
4	South Africa	4	25–14	0	England	25 November 2006
4	Argentina	4	18–13	0	France	22 November 2014
4	Italy	3	34–20	1	Scotland	5 February 2000
4	Italy	3	29–21	1	Romania	7 October 1990
4	France	3	28–19	1	Australia	30 June 1990
4	France	3	15–9	1	Scotland	19 January 1991
4	France	2	15–15	2	Australia	13 November 1983
4	France	2	15–12	2	England	20 January 1996

- There are 12 instances where 4 drop goals have been recorded in a Test Match. For the purpose of limiting the list to a reasonable size, the eight highest total scoring matches are shown here.

== See also ==
- International rugby union player records
- Records and statistics of the Rugby World Cup
- List of international rugby union teams
