= Rugby World Cup =

International men's rugby union competition

- Upcoming tournament 2027 Men's Rugby World Cup
- Sport: Rugby union
- Instituted: 1987; 39 years ago
- Number of teams: 24
- Regions: International (World Rugby)
- Holders: South Africa (2023)
- Most titles: South Africa (4 titles)
- Website: rugbyworldcup.com

The Men's Rugby World Cup is a rugby union tournament contested every four years between the top international teams, the winners of which are recognized as the world champions of the sport.

The tournament is administered by World Rugby, the sport's international governing body. The winners are awarded the Webb Ellis Cup, named after William Webb Ellis who, according to a popular legend, invented rugby by picking up the ball during a football game and running with it.

The tournament was first held in 1987 and was co-hosted by New Zealand and Australia. Four countries have won the trophy; South Africa four times, New Zealand three times, Australia twice, and England once. South Africa is the current champion, having defeated New Zealand in the final of the 2023 tournament.

Sixteen teams participated in the tournament from 1987 until 1995; in 1999, the tournament expanded to twenty teams. Japan hosted the 2019 Rugby World Cup and France hosted the 2023 Rugby World Cup. The tournament will expand again to twenty-four teams when it is held in Australia in 2027.

Starting in 2021, the women's equivalent tournament was officially renamed the Rugby World Cup to promote equality with the men's tournament. However, the 2021 event was the only one to use this naming convention as at the end of the 2023 World Cup, World Rugby announced that all future tournaments would include the words "Men's" or "Women's" in their titles. The first event to use this convention was the 2025 Women's Rugby World Cup, while the 2027 Men's Rugby World Cup will be the first to include "Men's" in its title.

== Format ==
=== Qualification ===
Under the current format, 24 teams qualify for each Rugby World Cup. Twelve teams qualified automatically for the 2027 edition, as a consequence of finishing top three in their 2023 pool. The qualification for the remaining 12 spots was allocated regionally; with a total of ten teams allocated for Europe, seven for the Pacific, two for South America - an additional space for a play-off between South America and the Pacific - two for Africa, one for Asia. The last place is determined by an intercontinental play-off.

=== Tournament ===
The tournament involves twenty-four nations competing over six weeks in October and November. There are two stages—a pool, followed by a knockout round. Nations are divided into four pools, A through to D, of four nations each. The teams are seeded based on the World Rankings. The six highest-ranked teams are drawn into pools A to F. This process is repeated down the seeding order, with a caveat to ensure the host country shall always be in Pool A.

Nations play three pool games, playing their respective pool members once each. A bonus points system is used during pool play. If two or more teams are level on points, a system of criteria determines the higher ranked.

Sixteen teams-the winner and runner-up from each of the six pools, plus the four best third placed teams-enter the knockout stage. The knockout stage consists of a round-of-sixteen, quarter-final, semi-finals, and then a final round which includes a bronze medal match and the Rugby World Cup Final. If a match in the knockout stages ends in a draw, the winner is determined through extra time. If that fails, the match goes into sudden death and the next team to score any points is the winner.

== History ==
=== Beginnings ===
Before the Rugby World Cup, there was no truly global rugby union competition, but there were a number of other tournaments. One of the oldest is the annual Six Nations Championship, which started in 1883 as the Home Nations Championship, a tournament between England, Ireland, Scotland and Wales. It expanded to the Five Nations in 1910, when France joined the tournament. France did not participate from 1931 to 1939, during which period it reverted to a Home Nations championship. In 2000, Italy joined the competition, which became the Six Nations.

Rugby union was also played at the Summer Olympic Games, first appearing at the 1900 Paris games and subsequently at London in 1908, Antwerp in 1920, and Paris again in 1924. France won the first gold medal, then Australasia, with the last two being won by the United States. However rugby union ceased to be on Olympic program after 1924. (Note: However an exhibition tournament, the 1936 FIRA Tournament, did take place at the 1936 Games. Rugby was reintroduced to the Olympics in 2016, but as men's and women's rugby sevens (i.e., seven-a-side rugby).)

The idea of a Rugby World Cup had been suggested on numerous occasions going back to the 1950s, but met with opposition from most unions in the IRFB. The idea resurfaced several times in the early 1980s, with the Australian Rugby Union (ARU; now known as Rugby Australia) in 1983, and the New Zealand Rugby Union (NZRU; now known as New Zealand Rugby) in 1984 independently proposing the establishment of a world cup. A proposal was again put to the IRFB in 1985 and this time passed 10–6. The delegates from Australia, France, New Zealand and South Africa all voted for the proposal, and the delegates from Ireland and Scotland against; the English and Welsh delegates were split, with one from each country for and one against.

The inaugural tournament, jointly hosted by Australia and New Zealand, was held in May and June 1987, with sixteen nations taking part. The inaugural World Cup in 1987, did not involve any qualifying process; instead, the 16 places were automatically filled by seven eligible International Rugby Football Board (IRFB, now World Rugby) member nations, and the rest by invitation. New Zealand became the first-ever champions, defeating France 29–9 in the final. The subsequent 1991 tournament was hosted by England, with matches played throughout Britain, Ireland and France. Qualifying tournaments were introduced for the second tournament, where eight of the sixteen places were contested in a twenty-four-nation tournament. This tournament saw the introduction of a qualifying tournament; eight places were allocated to the quarter-finalists from 1987, and the remaining eight decided by a thirty-five nation qualifying tournament. Australia won the second tournament, defeating England 12–6 in the final.

In 1992, eight years after their last official series, (Note: Against England in 1984.) South Africa hosted New Zealand in a one-off test match. The resumption of international rugby in South Africa came after the dismantling of the apartheid system. With their return to test rugby, South Africa were selected to host the 1995 Rugby World Cup. After upsetting Australia in the opening match, South Africa continued to advance through the tournament and met New Zealand in the final. After a tense final that went into extra time, South Africa emerged 15–12 winners, with then President Nelson Mandela, wearing a Springbok jersey, presenting the trophy to South Africa's captain, Francois Pienaar.

=== Professional era ===
The 1999 tournament was hosted by Wales with matches also being held throughout the rest of the United Kingdom, Ireland and France. The tournament included a repechage system, alongside specific regional qualifying places. The number of participating nations was increased from sixteen to twenty—and has remained to date at twenty. Australia claimed their second title, defeating France in the final. The combination of the sport turning professional after 1995 and the increase in teams from sixteen to twenty led to a number of remarkably lopsided results in both the 1999 and 2003 tournaments, with two matches in each tournament resulting in teams scoring over 100 points; Australia's 142–0 win over Namibia in 2003 stands as the most lopsided score in Rugby World Cup history.

In 2003 and 2007, the qualifying format allowed for eight of the twenty available positions to be automatically filled by the eight quarter-finalists of the previous tournament. The remaining twelve positions were filled by continental qualifying tournaments. Ten positions were filled by teams qualifying directly through continental competitions. Another two places were allocated for a cross-continental repechage.

The 2003 event was hosted by Australia, although it was originally intended to be held jointly with New Zealand. England emerged as champions defeating Australia in extra time. England's win broke the southern hemisphere's dominance in the event. Such was the celebration of England's victory that an estimated 750,000 people gathered in central London to greet the team, making the day the largest sporting celebration of its kind ever in the United Kingdom.

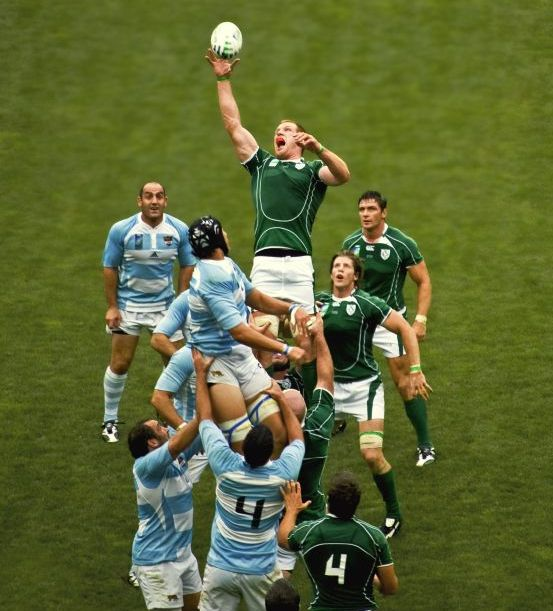
Ireland v Argentina in 2007

The 2007 competition was hosted by France, with matches also being held in Wales and Scotland. South Africa claimed their second title by defeating defending champions England 15–6. The biggest story of the tournament, however, was Argentina who racked up wins against some of the top European teams—France, Ireland, and Scotland—to finish first in the Pool of death and finish third overall in the tournament. The attention from Argentina's performance led to Argentina participating in SANZAAR and the professionalization of rugby in Argentina.

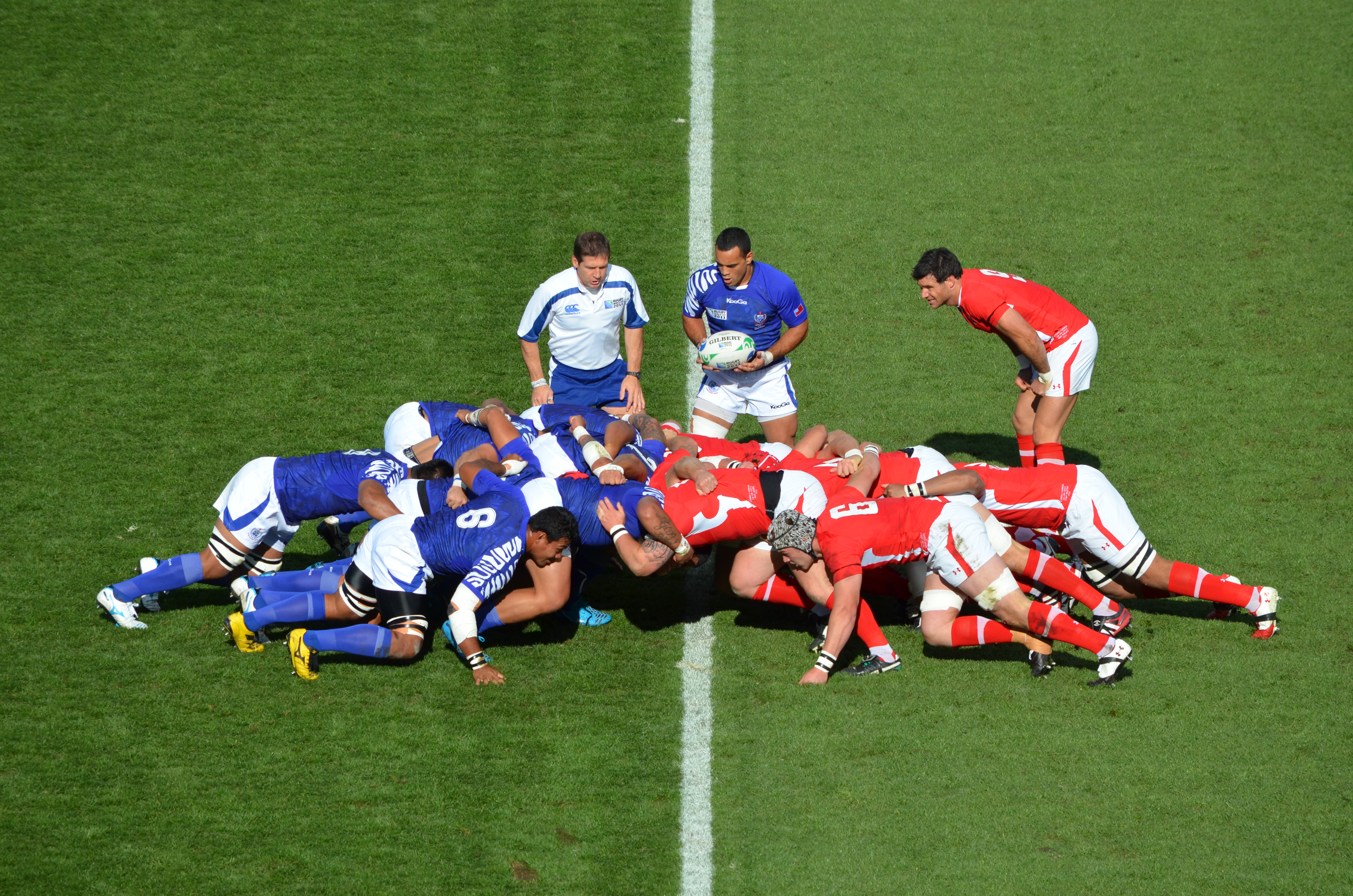
A scrum between Samoa (in blue) and Wales (in red) during the 2011 World Cup

The 2011 tournament was awarded to New Zealand in November 2005, ahead of bids from Japan and South Africa. The All Blacks reclaimed their place atop the rugby world with a narrow 8–7 win over France in the 2011 final.

The opening weekend of the 2015 tournament, hosted by England, generated the biggest upset in Rugby World Cup history when Japan, who had not won a single World Cup match since 1991, defeated heavily favoured South Africa. Overall, New Zealand once again won the final, this time against Australia. In doing so, they became the first team in World Cup history to win three titles, as well as the first to successfully defend a title.

Japan's hosting of the 2019 World Cup marked the first time the tournament had been held outside the traditional rugby strongholds; Japan won all four of their pool matches to top their group and qualify to the quarter-finals for the first time. The tournament saw South Africa claim their third trophy to match New Zealand for the most Rugby World Cup titles. South Africa defeated England 32–12 in the final.

Starting in 2021, gender designations were removed from the titles of the men's and women's World Cups. Accordingly, all World Cups for men and women will officially bear the "Rugby World Cup" name. The first tournament to be affected by the new policy was the 2022 women's tournament held in New Zealand, which retained its original title of "Rugby World Cup 2021" despite having been delayed from its original schedule due to COVID-19 issues.

France hosted the 2023 World Cup. The tournament was won by South Africa, who defeated New Zealand 12–11 to become the second nation to successfully defend their World Champion title and the first nation to win the tournament four times.

== Trophy ==
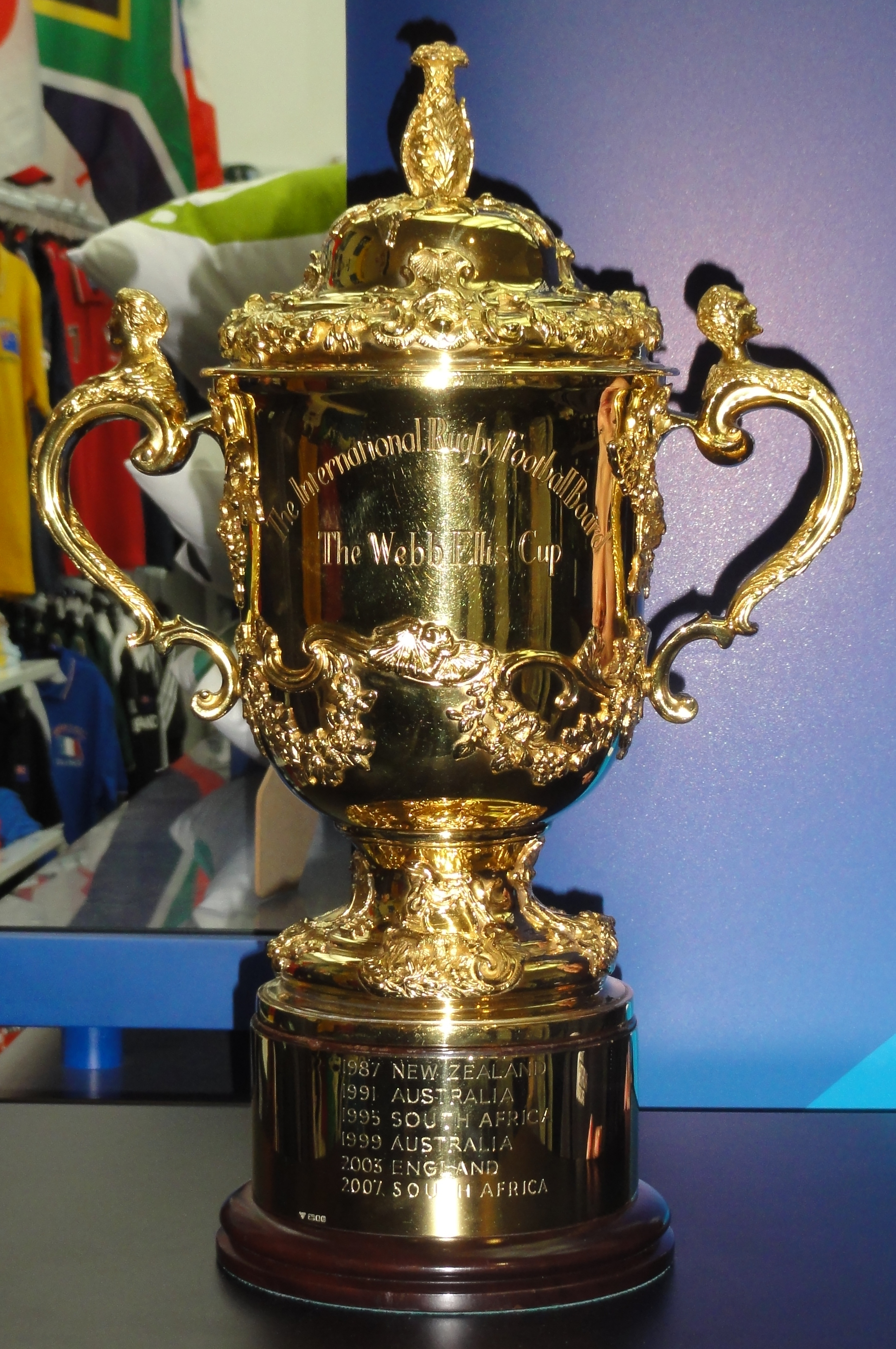
The Webb Ellis Cup

Winners of the Rugby World Cup are presented with the Webb Ellis Cup, named after William Webb Ellis. The trophy is also referred to simply as the Rugby World Cup. The trophy was chosen in 1987 for use in the competition, and was created in 1906 by Garrard's Crown Jewellers. The trophy is restored, repaired and its plinth engraved with the winner's name by Thomas Lyte between tournaments. The words 'The International Rugby Football Board' and 'The Webb Ellis Cup' are engraved on the face of the cup. It stands thirty-eight centimetres high and is silver gilded in gold, and supported by two cast scroll handles, one with the head of a satyr, and the other a head of a nymph. In Australia the trophy is colloquially known as "Bill"—a reference to William Webb Ellis.

== Selection of hosts ==
Tournaments are organised by Rugby World Cup Ltd (RWCL), which is itself owned by World Rugby. The selection of host is decided by a vote of World Rugby Council members. The voting procedure is managed by a team of independent auditors, and the voting kept secret. The host nation is generally selected five or six years before the competition.

The tournament has been hosted by multiple nations. For example, the 1987 tournament was co-hosted by Australia and New Zealand. World Rugby requires that the hosts must have a venue with a capacity of at least 60,000 spectators for the final. Host nations sometimes construct or upgrade stadia in preparation for the World Cup, such as Millennium Stadium—purposely built for the 1999 tournament—and Eden Park, upgraded for 2011. The first country outside of the traditional rugby nations of SANZAAR or the Six Nations to be awarded the hosting rights was 2019 host Japan. France hosted the 2023 tournament. The next tournament to be hosted by a nation outside the traditional nations will be the 2031 tournament in the United States.

== Tournament growth ==
=== Media coverage ===
Organizers of the Rugby World Cup, as well as the Global Sports Impact, state that the Rugby World Cup is the third largest sporting event in the world, behind only the FIFA World Cup and the Olympics, although other sources question whether this is accurate.

Reports emanating from World Rugby and its business partners have frequently touted the tournament's media growth, with cumulative worldwide television audiences of 300 million for the inaugural 1987 tournament, 1.75 billion in 1991, 2.67 billion in 1995, 3 billion in 1999, 3.5 billion in 2003, and 4 billion in 2007. The 4 billion figure was widely dismissed as the global audience for television is estimated to be about 4.2 billion.

However, independent reviews have called into question the methodology of those growth estimates, pointing to factual inconsistencies. The event's supposed drawing power outside of a handful of rugby strongholds was also downplayed significantly, with an estimated 97 percent of the 33 million average audience produced by the 2007 final coming from Australasia, South Africa, the British Isles and France. Other sports have been accused of exaggerating their television reach over the years; such claims are not exclusive to the Rugby World Cup.

While the event's global popularity remains a matter of dispute, high interest in traditional rugby nations is well documented. The 2003 final, between Australia and England, became the most watched rugby union match in the history of Australian television. The 2023 tournament achieved 1.33 billion viewing hours across all programming making it the most viewed rugby event of all time.

=== Attendance ===
Attendance figures
| Year | Host(s) | Teams | Total attendance | Matches | Avg attendance | % change in avg att. | Stadium capacity | Attendance as % of capacity |
|---|---|---|---|---|---|---|---|---|
| 1987 | New Zealand; Australia | 16 | 604,500 | 32 | 18,891 | — | 1,006,350 | 60% |
| 1991 | England; France; Ireland; Scotland; Wales | 16 | 1,007,760 | 32 | 31,493 | +67% | 1,212,800 | 79% |
| 1995 | South Africa | 16 | 1,100,000 | 32 | 34,375 | +9% | 1,423,850 | 77% |
| 1999 | Wales | 20 | 1,750,000 | 41 | 42,683 | +24% | 2,104,500 | 83% |
| 2003 | Australia | 20 | 1,837,547 | 48 | 38,282 | –10% | 2,208,529 | 83% |
| 2007 | France | 20 | 2,263,223 | 48 | 47,150 | +23% | 2,470,660 | 92% |
| 2011 | New Zealand | 20 | 1,477,294 | 48 | 30,777 | –35% | 1,732,000 | 85% |
| 2015 | England | 20 | 2,477,805 | 48 | 51,621 | +68% | 2,600,741 | 95% |
| 2019 | Japan | 20 | 1,698,528 | 45* | 37,745 | –27% | 1,811,866 | 90% |
| 2023 | France | 20 | 2,437,208 | 48 | 50,775 | +26% | 2,586,173 | 94% |
| 2027 | Australia | 24 | - | 52 | - | - | 2,779,320 | - |
*Typhoon Hagibis caused 3 group stage matches to be cancelled. As a result, only 45 of the scheduled 48 matches were played in the 2019 Rugby World Cup.

Key
| Record high |
| Record low |

=== Revenue ===
Revenue for Rugby World Cup tournaments
| Source | 1987 | 1991 | 1995 | 1999 | 2003 | 2007 | 2011 | 2015 | 2019 (Note: Figures published by World Rugby (WR) are for the entire year, and are not specific to the tournament.) | 2023 |
|---|---|---|---|---|---|---|---|---|---|---|
| Gate receipts (M £) | —N/a | —N/a | 15 | 55 | 81 | 147 | 131 | 250 | 259 | —N/a |
| Broadcasting (M £) | —N/a | —N/a | 19 | 44 | 60 | 82 | 93 | 155 | 136 | —N/a |
| Sponsorship (M £) | —N/a | —N/a | 8 | 18 | 16 | 28 | 29 | —N/a | 105 | —N/a |
| Surplus (M £) | 1 | 4 | 18 | 47 | 64 | 122 | 92 | 150 | 136 | 472 |

Notes:

- The host union keeps revenue from gate receipts. World Rugby, through RWCL, receive revenue from sources including broadcasting rights, sponsorship and tournament fees.

== Results ==
=== Tournaments ===
Keys

- aet: result/match won after extra time

| Ed. | Year | Host | First place game | | | Third place game | | | Num. teams |
| Ed. | Year | Host | Champion | Score | Runner-up | Third | Score | Fourth | Num. teams |
|---|---|---|---|---|---|---|---|---|---|
| 1 | 1987 | New Zealand; Australia | New Zealand | 29–9 | France | Wales | 22–21 | Australia | 16 |
| 2 | 1991 | England; France; Ireland; Scotland; Wales | Australia | 12–6 | England | New Zealand | 13–6 | Scotland | 16 |
| 3 | 1995 | South Africa | South Africa | 15–12 (a.e.t.) | New Zealand | France | 19–9 | England | 16 |
| 4 | 1999 | Wales | Australia | 35–12 | France | South Africa | 22–18 | New Zealand | 20 |
| 5 | 2003 | Australia | England | 20–17 (a.e.t.) | Australia | New Zealand | 40–13 | France | 20 |
| 6 | 2007 | France | South Africa | 15–6 | England | Argentina | 34–10 | France | 20 |
| 7 | 2011 | New Zealand | New Zealand | 8–7 | France | Australia | 21–18 | Wales | 20 |
| 8 | 2015 | England | New Zealand | 34–17 | Australia | South Africa | 24–13 | Argentina | 20 |
| 9 | 2019 | Japan | South Africa | 32–12 | England | New Zealand | 40–17 | Wales | 20 |
| 10 | 2023 | France | South Africa | 12–11 | New Zealand | England | 26–23 | Argentina | 20 |
| 11 | 2027 | Australia | To be determined | | | To be determined | | | 24 |
| 12 | 2031 | United States | To be determined | | | To be determined | | | 24 |

=== Performance of nations ===
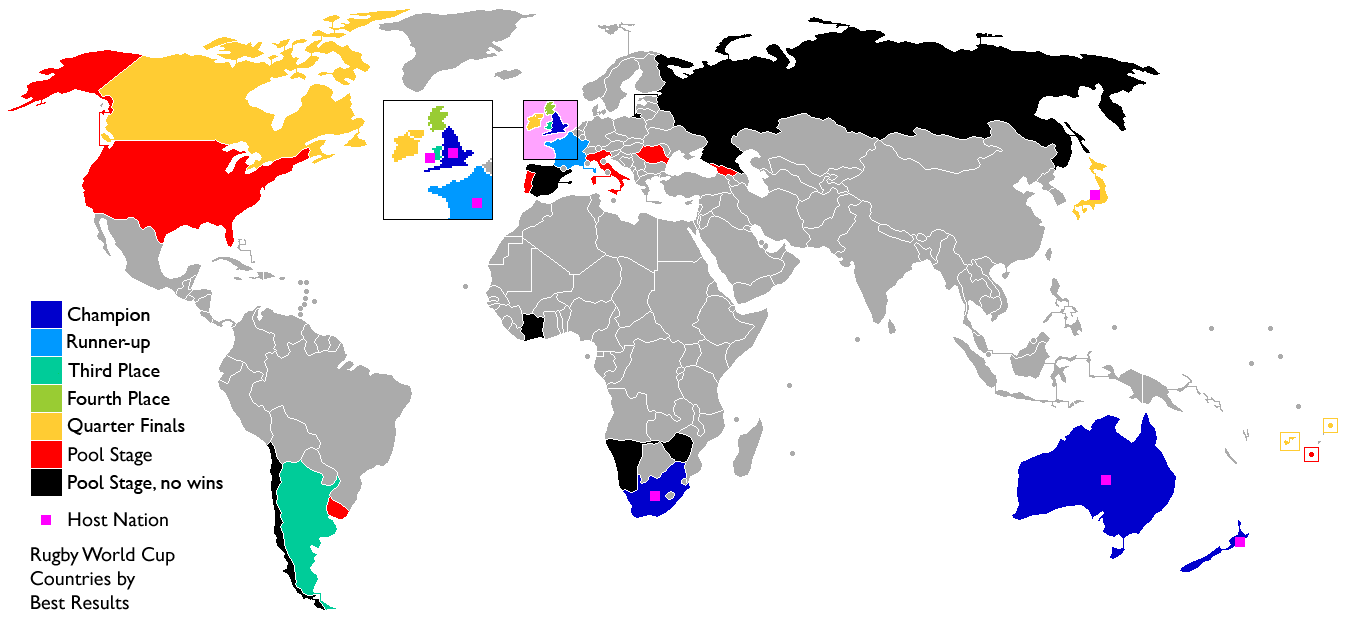
Map of nations' best results (excluding qualifying tournaments)

Twenty-six nations have participated at the Rugby World Cup (excluding qualifying tournaments). The only nations to host and win a tournament are New Zealand (1987 and 2011) and South Africa (1995). The performance of other host nations includes England (1991 final hosts) and Australia (2003 hosts) both finishing runners-up, while France (2007 hosts) finished fourth, and Wales (1999 hosts) and Japan (2019 hosts) reached the quarter-finals. Wales became the first host nation to be eliminated at the pool stages in 1991 while England became the first solo host nation to be eliminated at the pool stages in 2015. Of the twenty-five nations that have participated in at least one tournament, ten of them have never missed a tournament. (Note: Argentina, Australia, England, France, Ireland, Italy, Japan, New Zealand, Scotland and Wales are the nations that have never missed a tournament, playing in all nine thus far. South Africa has played in all eight in the post-apartheid era (as of 2023).)

=== Team records ===
| Team | Champions | Runners-up | Third | Fourth | Quarter-finals | Apps in top 8 |
|---|---|---|---|---|---|---|
| South Africa | 4 (1995, 2007, 2019, 2023) | —N/a | 2 (1999, 2015) | —N/a | 2 (2003, 2011) | 8 |
| New Zealand | 3 (1987, 2011, 2015) | 2 (1995, 2023) | 3 (1991, 2003, 2019) | 1 (1999) | 1 (2007) | 10 |
| Australia | 2 (1991, 1999) | 2 (2003, 2015) | 1 (2011) | 1 (1987) | 3 (1995, 2007, 2019) | 9 |
| England | 1 (2003) | 3 (1991, 2007, 2019) | 1 (2023) | 1 (1995) | 3 (1987, 1999, 2011) | 9 |
| France | —N/a | 3 (1987, 1999, 2011) | 1 (1995) | 2 (2003, 2007) | 4 (1991, 2015, 2019, 2023) | 10 |
| Wales | —N/a | —N/a | 1 (1987) | 2 (2011, 2019) | 4 (1999, 2003, 2015, 2023) | 7 |
| Argentina | —N/a | —N/a | 1 (2007) | 2 (2015, 2023) | 2 (1999, 2011) | 5 |
| Scotland | —N/a | —N/a | —N/a | 1 (1991) | 6 (1987, 1995, 1999, 2003, 2007, 2015) | 7 |
| Ireland | —N/a | —N/a | —N/a | —N/a | 8 (1987, 1991, 1995, 2003, 2011, 2015, 2019, 2023) | 8 |
| Fiji | —N/a | —N/a | —N/a | —N/a | 3 (1987, 2007, 2023) | 3 |
| Samoa | —N/a | —N/a | —N/a | —N/a | 2 (1991, 1995) | 2 |
| Canada | —N/a | —N/a | —N/a | —N/a | 1 (1991) | 1 |
| Japan | —N/a | —N/a | —N/a | —N/a | 1 (2019) | 1 |

=== Qualification results ===
As of the 2027 World Cup, 27 nations have qualified to compete across 11 tournaments.

| Team | (New Zealand) (Australia) 1987 | (England) (France) (Ireland) (Scotland) (Wales) 1991 | (South Africa) 1995 | (Wales) 1999 | (Australia) 2003 | (France) 2007 | (New Zealand) 2011 | (England) 2015 | (Japan) 2019 | (France) 2023 | (Australia) 2027 | (United States) 2031 | Years |
|---|---|---|---|---|---|---|---|---|---|---|---|---|---|
| Argentina | Q | Q | Q | Q | Q | Q | Q | Q | Q | Q | Q | TBD | 11 |
| Australia | Q | Q | Q | Q | Q | Q | Q | Q | Q | Q | Q | TBD | 11 |
| Canada | Q | Q | Q | Q | Q | Q | Q | Q | Q | - | Q | TBD | 10 |
| Chile | - | - | - | - | - | - | - | - | - | Q | Q | TBD | 2 |
| England | Q | Q | Q | Q | Q | Q | Q | Q | Q | Q | Q | TBD | 11 |
| Fiji | Q | Q | - | Q | Q | Q | Q | Q | Q | Q | Q | TBD | 10 |
| France | Q | Q | Q | Q | Q | Q | Q | Q | Q | Q | Q | TBD | 11 |
| Georgia | N/A | N/A | - | - | Q | Q | Q | Q | Q | Q | Q | TBD | 7 |
| Hong Kong | - | - | - | - | - | - | - | - | - | - | Q | TBD | 1 |
| Ireland | Q | Q | Q | Q | Q | Q | Q | Q | Q | Q | Q | TBD | 11 |
| Italy | Q | Q | Q | Q | Q | Q | Q | Q | Q | Q | Q | TBD | 11 |
| Ivory Coast | - | - | Q | - | - | - | - | - | - | - | - | TBD | 1 |
| Japan | Q | Q | Q | Q | Q | Q | Q | Q | Q | Q | Q | TBD | 11 |
| Namibia | N/A | N/A | - | Q | Q | Q | Q | Q | Q | Q | - | TBD | 7 |
| New Zealand | Q | Q | Q | Q | Q | Q | Q | Q | Q | Q | Q | TBD | 11 |
| Portugal | - | - | - | - | - | Q | - | - | - | Q | Q | TBD | 3 |
| Romania | Q | Q | Q | Q | Q | Q | Q | Q | E | Q | Q | TBD | 10 |
| Russia | | - | - | - | X | - | Q | - | Q | B | B | TBD | 2 |
| Samoa | - | Q | Q | Q | Q | Q | Q | Q | Q | Q | Q | TBD | 10 |
| Scotland | Q | Q | Q | Q | Q | Q | Q | Q | Q | Q | Q | TBD | 11 |
| South Africa | B | B | Q | Q | Q | Q | Q | Q | Q | Q | Q | TBD | 9 |
| Spain | - | - | - | Q | - | - | - | - | X | E | Q | TBD | 2 |
| Tonga | Q | - | Q | Q | Q | Q | Q | Q | Q | Q | Q | TBD | 10 |
| United States | Q | Q | - | Q | Q | Q | Q | Q | Q | - | Q | Q | 9 |
| Uruguay | - | - | - | Q | Q | - | - | Q | Q | Q | Q | TBD | 6 |
| Wales | Q | Q | Q | Q | Q | Q | Q | Q | Q | Q | Q | TBD | 11 |
| Zimbabwe | Q | Q | - | - | - | - | - | - | - | - | Q | TBD | 3 |
| Total | 16 | 16 | 16 | 20 | 20 | 20 | 20 | 20 | 20 | 20 | 24 | 24 | |

Legend

- = Hosts
- Q = Qualified (or just for the 1987 World Cup, invited)
- - = Did not qualify (or not invited to the 1987 World Cup)
- X = Expelled during qualification
- E = Expelled after qualification
- B = Banned

== Records and statistics ==
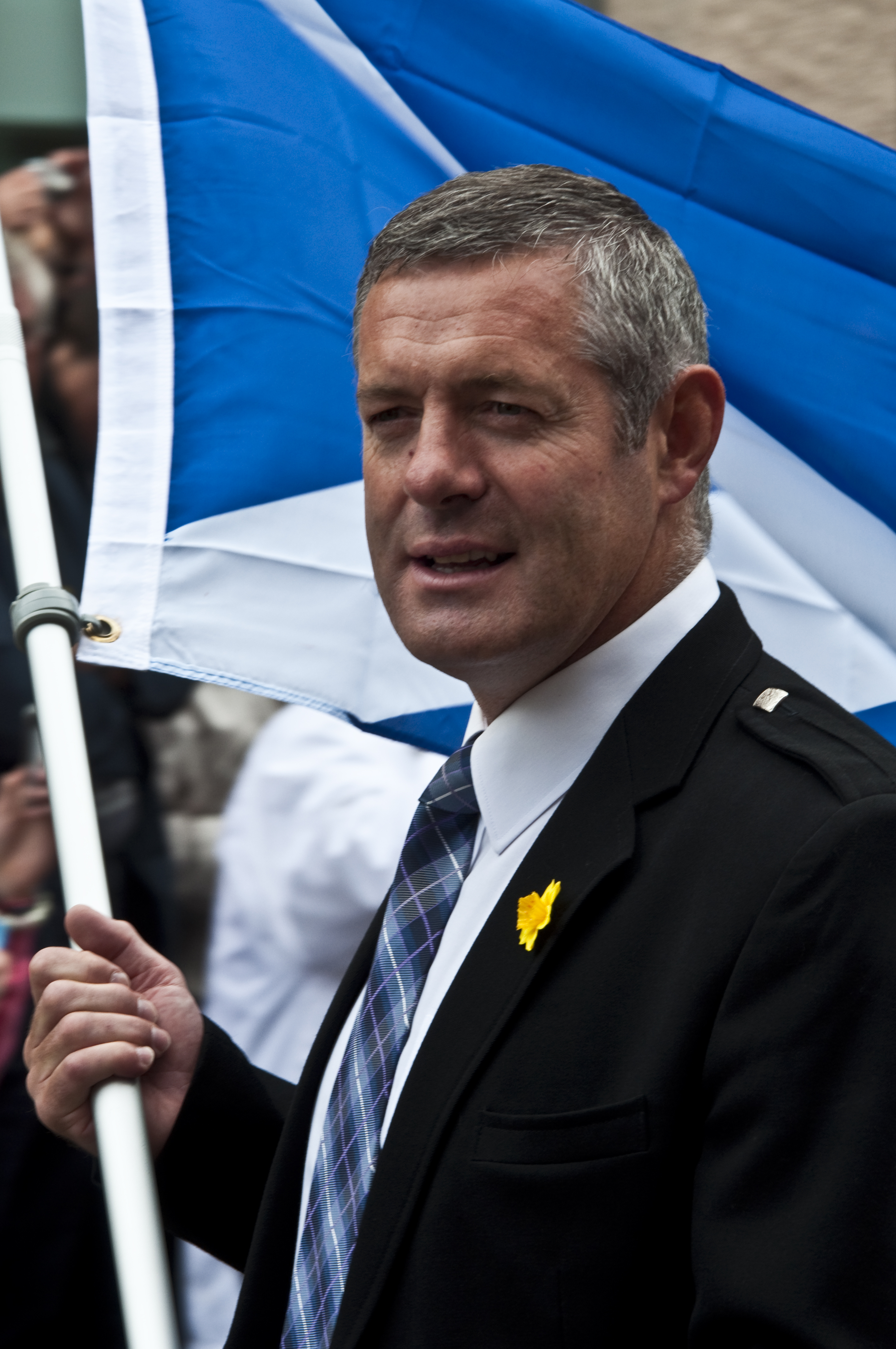
Gavin Hastings of Scotland is one of four players to have kicked a record eight penalties in a single World Cup match.

The record for most points overall is held by English player Jonny Wilkinson, who scored 277 during his World Cup career. New Zealand All Black Grant Fox holds the record for most points in one competition, with 126 in 1987; Sam Whitelock of New Zealand holds the record for most World Cup matches: 26 between 2011 and 2023. All Black Simon Culhane holds the record for most points in a match by one player, 45, as well as the record for most conversions in a match, 20. All Black Marc Ellis holds the record for most tries in a match, six, which he scored against Japan in 1995.

New Zealand's Jonah Lomu is the youngest player to appear in a final—aged 20 years and 43 days in the 1995 final. Lomu (playing in two tournaments) and South African Bryan Habana (playing in three tournaments) share the record for most total World Cup tournament tries, both scoring 15. Lomu (in 1999) and Habana (in 2007) also share the record, along with All Black Julian Savea (in 2015) and Will Jordan (in 2023), for most tries in a tournament, with 8 each. South Africa's Jannie de Beer kicked five drop-goals against England in 1999—an individual record for a single World Cup match. The record for most penalties in a match is 8, held by Australian Matt Burke, Argentinian Gonzalo Quesada, Scotland's Gavin Hastings and France's Thierry Lacroix, with Quesada also holding the record for most penalties in a tournament, with 31.

The most points scored in a game is 145, by the All Blacks against Japan in 1995, while the widest winning margin is 142, held by Australia in a match against Namibia in 2003.

A total of 25 players have been sent off (red carded) in the tournament. Welsh lock Huw Richards was the first, while playing against New Zealand in 1987. No player has been red carded more than once.

== See also ==
- International rugby union player records
- International rugby union team records
- Rugby World Cup Sevens – men's and women's tournaments held simultaneously at a single site
