= List of international rugby union tries by Bryan Habana =

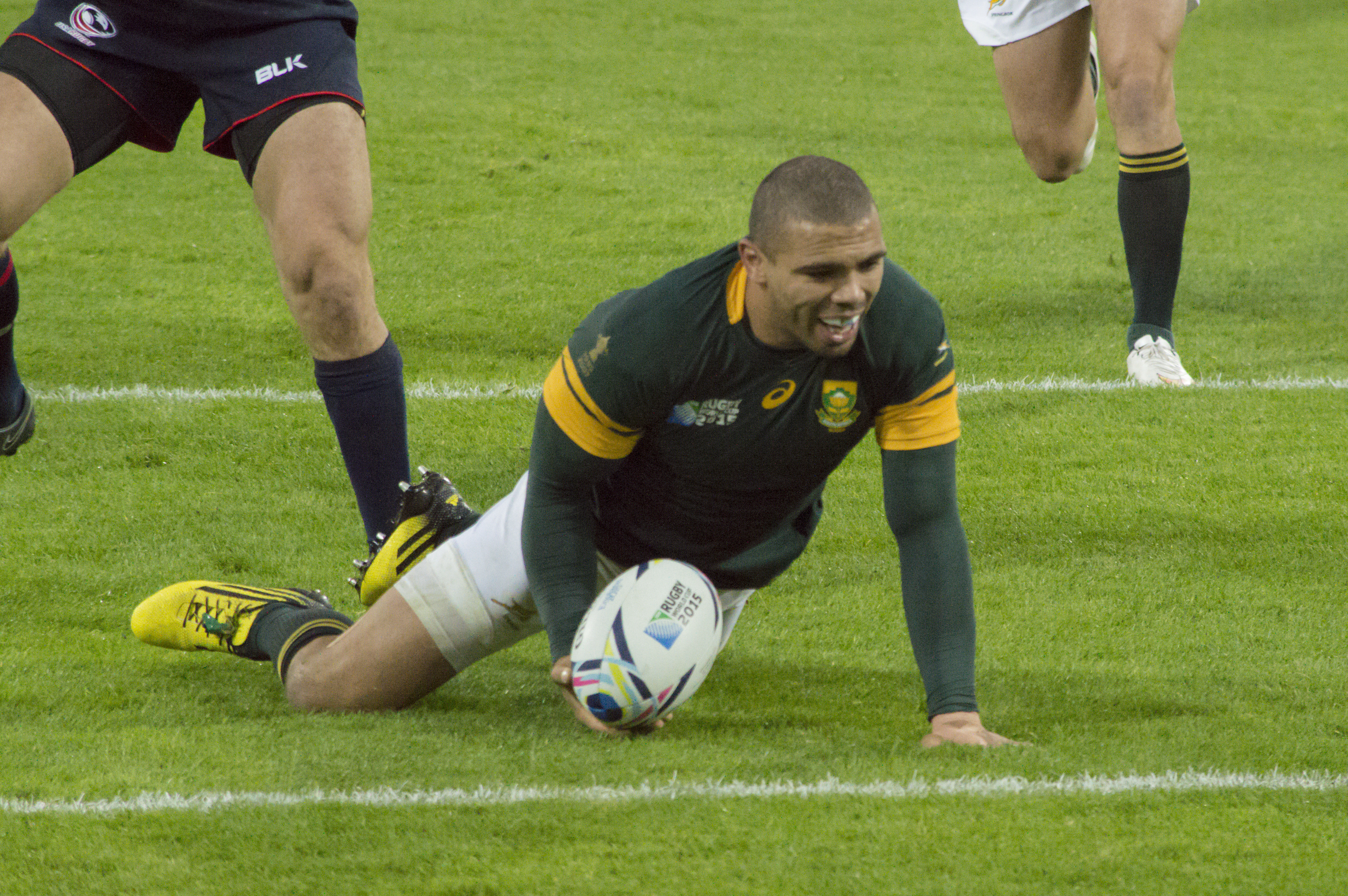
Bryan Habana playing at the 2015 Rugby World Cup

Bryan Habana is a former South African rugby union player who played on the wing. As of January 2018, Habana has represented South Africa 124 times and has scored 67 tries. Habana's try total places him second on the all-time list, and also makes him South Africa's leading international try scorer. Habana has also scored more international tries outside his home country than any other player in history, with a total of 38 either away or at neutral venues.

Habana made his international debut for South Africa against England at Twickenham in 2004. It was during this match that Habana scored his first try, before scoring two tries against Scotland a week later. Habana played in South Africa's winning 2007 Rugby World Cup campaign, where he finished the tournament as the leading try scorer with eight, including four tries in a single match against Samoa.

When Habana scored a try against Italy on 21 November 2009, it meant that he had scored a try against each of the "Tier 1" nations. The following year Habana scored another two tries against Italy in separate matches, the second of which brought Habana's total to 38, equalling the South African record set by Joost van der Westhuizen. Habana remained level with van der Westhuizen, failing to score for almost fifteen months, before ending his drought at the 2011 World Cup against Namibia. Habana became the second South African to win the IRPA Try of the Year for his try against New Zealand in 2012. Running between two defending players and chipping the ball over a third, Habana slid in to score in the South African's 21–11 defeat in the 2012 Rugby Championship.

== International tries ==
Key

- Won denotes that the match was won by South Africa
- Lost denotes that the match was lost by South Africa
- Drawn denotes that the match was drawn
- ‡ denotes the try was selected as the IRPA Try of the Year.

International tries scored by Bryan Habana
Try	Opposing team	Location	Venue	Competition	Date	Result	Score	Ref.
1	England	London	Twickenham	Test match	20 November 2004	Lost	16–32	
2	Scotland	Edinburgh	Murrayfield	Test match	27 November 2004	Won	45–10	
3	Scotland	Edinburgh	Murrayfield	Test match	27 November 2004	Won	45–10	
4	Uruguay	East London	Buffalo City Stadium	Test match	11 June 2005	Won	134–3	
5	Uruguay	East London	Buffalo City Stadium	Test match	11 June 2005	Won	134–3	
6	France	Durban	Kings Park	Test match	18 June 2005	Drawn	30–30	
7	France	Durban	Kings Park	Test match	18 June 2005	Drawn	30–30	
8	France	Port Elizabeth	EPRU Stadium	Test match	25 June 2005	Won	27–13	
9	France	Port Elizabeth	EPRU Stadium	Test match	25 June 2005	Won	27–13	
10	Australia	Johannesburg	Ellis Park	Mandela Challenge Plate	23 July 2005	Won	33–20	
11	Australia	Perth	Subiaco Oval	2005 Tri Nations Series	20 August 2005	Won	22–19	
12	Australia	Perth	Subiaco Oval	2005 Tri Nations Series	20 August 2005	Won	22–19	
13	New Zealand	Dunedin	Carisbrook	2005 Tri Nations Series	27 August 2005	Lost	27–31	
14	Wales	Cardiff	Millennium Stadium	Test match	19 November 2005	Won	33–16	
15	Wales	Cardiff	Millennium Stadium	Test match	19 November 2005	Won	33–16	
16	New Zealand	Rustenburg	Olympia Park	2006 Tri Nations Series	2 September 2006	Won	21–20	
17	Ireland	Dublin	Lansdowne Road	Test match	11 November 2006	Lost	15–32	
18	England	Bloemfontein	Free State Stadium	Test match	26 May 2007	Won	58–10	
19	England	Bloemfontein	Free State Stadium	Test match	26 May 2007	Won	58–10	
20	England	Pretoria	Loftus Versfeld	Test match	2 June 2007	Won	55–22	
21	England	Pretoria	Loftus Versfeld	Test match	2 June 2007	Won	55–22	
22	Scotland	Edinburgh	Murrayfield	Test match	25 August 2007	Won	27–3	
23	Samoa	Paris	Parc des Princes	2007 Rugby World Cup	9 September 2007	Won	59–7	
24	Samoa	Paris	Parc des Princes	2007 Rugby World Cup	9 September 2007	Won	59–7	
25	Samoa	Paris	Parc des Princes	2007 Rugby World Cup	9 September 2007	Won	59–7	
26	Samoa	Paris	Parc des Princes	2007 Rugby World Cup	9 September 2007	Won	59–7	
27	United States	Montpellier	Stade de la Mosson	2007 Rugby World Cup	30 September 2007	Won	64–15	
28	United States	Montpellier	Stade de la Mosson	2007 Rugby World Cup	30 September 2007	Won	64–15	
29	Argentina	Saint-Denis	Stade de France	2007 Rugby World Cup	14 October 2007	Won	37–13	
30	Argentina	Saint-Denis	Stade de France	2007 Rugby World Cup	14 October 2007	Won	37–13	
31	New Zealand	Wellington	Westpac Stadium	2008 Tri Nations Series	5 July 2008	Lost	8–19	
32	England	London	Twickenham	Test match	22 November 2008	Won	42–6	
33	British & Irish Lions	Pretoria	Loftus Versfeld	Test match	27 June 2009	Won	28–25	
34	Australia	Perth	Subiaco Oval	2009 Tri Nations Series	29 August 2009	Won	32–25	
35	Australia	Perth	Subiaco Oval	2009 Tri Nations Series	29 August 2009	Won	32–25	
36	Italy	Udine	Stadio Friuli	Test match	21 November 2009	Won	32–10	
37	Italy	Witbank	Puma Stadium	Test match	19 June 2010	Won	29–13	
38	Italy	East London	Buffalo City Stadium	Test match	26 June 2010	Won	55–11	
39	Namibia	Auckland	North Harbour Stadium	2011 Rugby World Cup	22 September 2011	Won	87–0	
40	Samoa	Auckland	North Harbour Stadium	2011 Rugby World Cup	30 September 2011	Won	13–5	
41	Argentina	Cape Town	Newlands	2012 Rugby Championship	18 August 2012	Won	27–6	
42	Australia	Perth	Subiaco Oval	2012 Rugby Championship	8 September 2012	Lost	19–26	
43	New Zealand	Dunedin	Forsyth Barr Stadium	2012 Rugby Championship	15 September 2012	Lost	11–21	
44	Australia	Pretoria	Loftus Versfeld	2012 Rugby Championship	29 September 2012	Won	31–8	
45	Australia	Pretoria	Loftus Versfeld	2012 Rugby Championship	29 September 2012	Won	31–8	
46	Australia	Pretoria	Loftus Versfeld	2012 Rugby Championship	29 September 2012	Won	31–8	
47 ‡	New Zealand	Johannesburg	FNB Stadium	2012 Rugby Championship	6 October 2012	Lost	16–32	
48	Italy	Durban	Kings Park	Test match	8 June 2013	Won	44–10	
49	Samoa	Pretoria	Loftus Versfeld	Test match	22 June 2013	Won	56–23	
50	Samoa	Pretoria	Loftus Versfeld	Test match	22 June 2013	Won	56–23	
51	Argentina	Johannesburg	FNB Stadium	2013 Rugby Championship	17 August 2013	Won	73–13	
52	New Zealand	Johannesburg	Ellis Park	2013 Rugby Championship	5 October 2013	Lost	27–38	
53	New Zealand	Johannesburg	Ellis Park	2013 Rugby Championship	5 October 2013	Lost	27–38	
54	Wales	Durban	Kings Park	Test match	14 June 2014	Won	38–16	
55	Wales	Durban	Kings Park	Test match	14 June 2014	Won	38–16	
56	Argentina	Salta	Ernesto Martearena	2014 Rugby Championship	23 August 2014	Won	33–31	
57	Italy	Padua	Stadio Euganeo	Test match	22 November 2014	Won	22–6	
58	Argentina	Durban	Kings Park	2015 Rugby Championship	8 August 2015	Lost	25–37	
59	Argentina	Buenos Aires	José Amalfitani	2015 Rugby World Cup warm-up matches	15 August 2015	Won	26–12	
60	Samoa	Birmingham	Villa Park	2015 Rugby World Cup	26 September 2015	Won	46–6	
61	Scotland	Newcastle	St James' Park	2015 Rugby World Cup	3 October 2015	Won	34–16	
62	United States	London	London Stadium	2015 Rugby World Cup	7 October 2015	Won	64–0	
63	United States	London	London Stadium	2015 Rugby World Cup	7 October 2015	Won	64–0	
64	United States	London	London Stadium	2015 Rugby World Cup	7 October 2015	Won	64–0	
65	Argentina	Salta	Ernesto Martearena	2016 Rugby Championship	27 August 2016	Lost	24–26	
66	New Zealand	Christchurch	AMI Stadium	2016 Rugby Championship	17 September 2016	Lost	13–41	
67	Italy	Florence	Stadio Artemio Franchi	Test match	19 November 2016	Lost	18–20	
