= 1991 Rugby World Cup statistics =

This article documents statistics from the 1991 Rugby World Cup, jointly hosted by England, Scotland, Wales, Ireland and France from 3 October to 2 November.

== Team statistics ==
The following table shows the team's results in major statistical categories.

Team statistics
Team	Played	Won	Drawn	Lost	Points difference	Tries	Conversions	Penalties	Drop goals
Australia	6	6	0	0	71	17	11	12	0
New Zealand	6	5	0	1	69	19	11	15	0
England	6	4	0	2	58	11	9	17	2
Scotland	6	4	0	2	98	20	14	16	2
France	4	3	0	1	48	13	5	10	0
Canada	4	2	0	2	−4	6	2	8	2
Ireland	4	2	0	2	50	13	7	16	2
Western Samoa	4	2	0	2	−2	8	5	5	1
Italy	3	1	0	2	−19	7	7	5	0
Japan	3	1	0	2	−10	13	8	2	1
Romania	3	1	0	2	−33	5	1	3	0
Wales	3	1	0	2	−29	3	1	6	0
Argentina	3	0	0	3	−45	4	2	4	2
Fiji	3	0	0	3	−36	1	1	3	4
United States	3	0	0	3	−89	2	2	4	0
Zimbabwe	3	0	0	3	−127	6	2	1	0

Source: ESPNscrum.com

== Top point scorers ==
Top 10 point scorers
Player	Team	Position	Played	Tries	Conversions	Penalties	Drop goals	Total points
Ralph Keyes	Ireland	Fly-half	4	0	7	16	2	68
Michael Lynagh	Australia	Fly-half	6	2	11	12	0	66
Gavin Hastings	Scotland	Fullback	5	1	9	13	0	61
Jonathan Webb	England	Fullback	5	1	5	14	0	56
Grant Fox	New Zealand	First five-eighth	4	0	7	10	0	44
Didier Camberabero	France	Fly-half	3	1	5	6	0	32
Diego Dominguez	Italy	Fly-half	3	0	7	5	0	29
Takahiro Hosokawa	Japan	Fullback	3	1	8	2	1	29
Mathew Vaea	Western Samoa	Scrum-half	4	0	5	5	0	25
David Campese	Australia	Wing	6	6	0	0	0	24

== Top try scorers ==
Top 10 try scorers
Player	Team	Position	Played	Tries	Conv	Penalties	Drop goals	Total points
David Campese	Australia	Wing	6	6	0	0	0	24
Jean-Baptiste Lafond	France	Wing	4	6	0	0	0	24
Brian Robinson	Ireland	Flanker	4	4	0	0	0	16
Iwan Tukalo	Scotland	Wing	6	4	0	0	0	16
Rory Underwood	England	Wing	6	4	0	0	0	16
Tim Horan	Australia	Centre	6	4	0	0	0	16
John Timu	New Zealand	Fullback	4	3	0	0	0	12
Martín Terán	Argentina	Wing	3	3	0	0	0	12
Terry Wright	New Zealand	Wing	4	3	0	0	0	12
Tony Stanger	Scotland	Wing	6	3	0	0	0	12

== Hat-tricks ==
Unless otherwise noted, players in this list scored a hat-trick of tries.

No.	Player	For	Against	Stage	Result	Venue	Date
1	Brian Robinson^{T4}	Ireland	Zimbabwe	Pool	55–11	Lansdowne Road, Dublin	6 October 1991
2	Terry Wright	New Zealand	United States	Pool	46–6	Kingsholm, Gloucester	8 October 1991
3	Jean-Baptiste Lafond	France	Fiji	Pool	33–9	Stade Lesdiguières, Grenoble	8 October 1991
4	Iwan Tukalo	Scotland	Zimbabwe	Pool	51–12	Murrayfield, Edinburgh	9 October 1991

Key
^{T4}	Scored four tries

== Stadiums ==
Stadium	City	Capacity	Matches played	Overall attendance	Average attendance per match	Average attendance as % of capacity	Tries scored	Avg. tries scored / match	Overall points scored	Avg. points scored / match
Twickenham Stadium	London	75,000	4	188,208	47,052	62.74%	13	3.25	136	34.00
Murrayfield Stadium	Edinburgh	67,800	5	237,000	47,400	69.91%	23	4.60	207	41.40
Cardiff Arms Park	Cardiff	53,000	4	181,000	45,250	85.38%	13	3.25	112	28.00
Lansdowne Road	Dublin	49,250	4	178,500	44,625	90.61%	23	5.75	173	43.25
Parc des Princes	Paris	48,712	1	48,500	48,500	99.56%	3	3.00	29	29.00
Stade Ernest-Wallon	Toulouse	19,000	1	10,000	10,000	52.63%	4	4.00	30	30.00
Stade Lesdiguières	Grenoble	18,548	1	18,548	18,548	100.00%	7	7.00	42	42.00
Stadium Lille-Metropole	Villeneuve d'Ascq	18,185	1	30,360	30,360	166.95%	7	7.00	42	42.00
Stade de la Méditerranée	Béziers	18,000	1	22,000	22,000	122.22%	4	4.00	33	33.00
Welford Road	Leicester	16,815	1	15,711	15,711	93.43%	6	6.00	52	52.00
Parc Municipal des Sports	Brive	16,000	1	8,500	8,500	53.13%	3	3.00	32	32.00
Stade Armandie	Agen	14,000	1	15,000	15,000	107.14%	3	3.00	32	32.00
Pontypool Park	Pontypool	14,000	1	15,000	15,000	107.14%	0	0.00	12	12.00
Stade Jean Dauger	Bayonne	13,500	1	5,000	5,000	37.04%	1	1.00	16	16.00
Kingsholm	Gloucester	12,500	1	12,000	12,000	96.00%	8	8.00	52	52.00
Ravenhill	Belfast	12,500	1	9,500	9,500	76.00%	11	11.00	60	60.00
Stradey Park	Llanelli	10,800	1	11,000	11,000	101.85%	7	7.00	51	51.00
Sardis Road	Pontypridd	6,000	1	8,500	8,500	141.67%	7	7.00	47	47.00
Cross Green	Otley	5,000	1	7,500	7,500	150.00%	5	5.00	39	39.00
Total		1,291,560	32	1,021,827	31,932	79.12%	148	4.63	1,197	37.41

== See also ==
- 1995 Rugby World Cup statistics
- Records and statistics of the Rugby World Cup
- List of Rugby World Cup hat-tricks
