= 1999 Rugby World Cup statistics =

This article documents statistics from the 1999 Rugby World Cup, principally hosted in Wales from 1 October to 6 November.

== Team statistics ==
The following table shows the team's results in major statistical categories.

Team statistics
Team	Played	Won	Drawn	Lost	Points difference	Tries	Conversions	Penalties	Drop goals
Australia	6	6	0	0	148	24	19	20	1
France	6	5	0	1	66	22	17	20	2
South Africa	6	5	0	1	118	21	18	18	8
New Zealand	6	4	0	2	144	29	22	22	0
Argentina	5	3	0	2	15	6	4	32	1
England	5	3	0	2	135	26	21	26	0
Scotland	5	3	0	2	65	20	14	12	3
Fiji	4	2	0	2	35	17	15	10	1
Ireland	4	2	0	2	51	12	11	12	2
Samoa	4	2	0	2	10	13	11	10	0
Wales	4	2	0	2	32	14	12	11	0
Canada	3	1	0	2	32	12	12	9	1
Romania	3	1	0	2	−76	5	2	7	0
Tonga	3	1	0	2	−124	4	3	6	1
Uruguay	3	1	0	2	−55	4	2	6	0
Italy	3	0	0	3	−161	2	2	7	0
Japan	3	0	0	3	−104	2	1	8	0
Namibia	3	0	0	3	−144	4	2	6	0
Spain	3	0	0	3	−104	0	0	6	0
United States	3	0	0	3	−83	5	3	6	1

Source: ESPNscrum.com

== Top point scorers ==
Top 10 point scorers
Player	Team	Position	Played	Tries	Conversions	Penalties	Drop goals	Total points
Gonzalo Quesada	Argentina	Fly-half	5	0	3	31	1	102
Matt Burke	Australia	Full-back	6	2	17	19	0	101
Jannie de Beer	South Africa	Fly-half	5	0	17	15	6	97
Andrew Mehrtens	New Zealand	First five-eighth	5	0	11	19	0	79
Jonny Wilkinson	England	Fly-half	4	1	8	16	0	69
Christophe Lamaison	France	Fly-half	6	1	9	12	2	65
Silao Leaega	Samoa	Wing	4	2	11	10	0	62
Neil Jenkins	Wales	Fly-half	4	0	12	11	0	57
Paul Grayson	England	Fly-half	4	0	12	10	0	54
Kenny Logan	Scotland	Wing	4	0	9	11	0	51

== Top try scorers ==
Top 10 try scorers
Player	Team	Position	Played	Tries	Conv	Penalties	Drop goals	Total points
Jonah Lomu	New Zealand	Wing	6	8	0	0	0	40
Jeff Wilson	New Zealand	Wing	6	6	0	0	0	30
Dan Luger	England	Wing	5	4	0	0	0	20
Keith Wood	Ireland	Hooker	4	4	0	0	0	20
Philippe Bernat-Salles	France	Wing	5	4	0	0	0	20
Viliame Satala	Fiji	Centre	4	4	0	0	0	20
Ben Tune	Australia	Wing	5	3	0	0	0	15
Brian Lima	Samoa	Wing	4	3	0	0	0	15
Cameron Murray	Scotland	Wing	5	3	0	0	0	15
Émile Ntamack	France	Wing	6	3	0	0	0	15

== Hat-tricks ==
Unless otherwise noted, players in this list scored a hat-trick of tries.

No.	Player	For	Against	Stage	Result	Venue	Date
1	Keith Wood^{T4}	Ireland	United States	Pool	53–8	Lansdowne Road, Dublin	2 October 1999
2	Toutai Kefu	Australia	Romania	Pool	57–9	Ravenhill, Belfast	3 October 1999
3	Ugo Mola	France	Namibia	Pool	47–13	Stade Chaban-Delmas, Bordeaux	8 October 1999
4	Jeff Wilson	New Zealand	Italy	Pool	101–3	Galpharm Stadium, Huddersfield	14 October 1999
5	Jannie De Beer^{D5}	South Africa	England	Quarter-final	44–21	Stade de France, Saint-Denis	24 October 1999

Key
^{D5}	Scored five drop goals
^{T4}	Scored four tries

== Stadiums ==
Stadium	City	Capacity	Matches played	Overall attendance	Average attendance per match	Average attendance as % of capacity	Tries scored	Avg. tries scored / match	Overall points scored	Avg. points scored / match
Stade de France	Saint-Denis	80,000	1	75,000	75,000	93.75%	2	2.00	65	65.00
Twickenham	London	75,000	6	414,955	69,159	92.21%	41	6.83	422	70.33
Millennium Stadium	Cardiff	74,500	7	458,000	65,429	87.82%	29	4.14	354	50.57
Murrayfield	Edinburgh	67,500	6	169,187	28,198	41.77%	39	6.50	331	55.17
Hampden Park	Glasgow	52,500	1	3,500	3,500	6.67%	5	5.00	42	42.00
Lansdowne Road	Dublin	49,250	5	155,250	31,050	63.05%	30	6.00	270	54.00
Stade Félix Bollaert	Lens	41,800	1	22,000	22,000	52.63%	1	1.00	52	52.00
Parc Lescure	Bordeaux	38,327	2	61,030	30,515	79.62%	12	6.00	120	60.00
Stadium de Toulouse	Toulouse	37,000	2	64,000	32,000	86.49%	14	7.00	130	65.00
McAlpine Stadium	Huddersfield	24,500	1	24,000	24,000	97.96%	14	14.00	104	104.00
Ashton Gate	Bristol	21,500	1	22,000	22,000	102.33%	5	5.00	54	54.00
Stade de la Méditerranée	Béziers	18,000	2	28,000	14,000	77.78%	17	8.50	138	69.00
Welford Road Stadium	Leicester	16,500	1	10,244	10,244	62.08%	4	4.00	53	53.00
Racecourse Ground	Wrexham	15,500	1	15,000	15,000	96.77%	5	5.00	52	52.00
Thomond Park	Limerick	13,500	1	13,000	13,000	96.30%	9	9.00	74	74.00
Ravenhill	Belfast	12,500	1	12,500	12,500	100.00%	9	9.00	66	66.00
Stradey Park	Llanelli	10,800	1	11,000	11,000	101.85%	2	2.00	48	48.00
Netherdale	Galashiels	6,000	1	3,761	3,761	62.68%	4	4.00	42	42.00
Total		2,104,504	41	1,562,427	38,108	76.48%	242	5.93	2,417	58.95

== See also ==
- 2003 Rugby World Cup statistics
- Records and statistics of the Rugby World Cup
- List of Rugby World Cup hat-tricks
