= 2003 Rugby World Cup statistics =

This article documents statistics from the 2003 Rugby World Cup, held in Australia from 10 October to 22 November.

== Team statistics ==
The following table shows the team's results in major statistical categories. No teams were shown a red card during the tournament.

Team statistics
Team	Played	Won	Drawn	Lost	Points difference	Tries	Conversions	Penalties	Drop goals	Yellow card
England	7	7	0	0	239	36	27	23	8	1
Australia	7	6	0	1	267	43	32	21	1	1
New Zealand	7	6	0	1	260	52	40	6	1	1
France	7	5	0	2	112	29	22	22	4	5
South Africa	5	3	0	2	104	27	17	7	1	1
Ireland	5	3	0	2	63	20	16	9	1	1
Wales	5	3	0	2	23	17	14	11	1	2
Scotland	5	3	0	2	−12	12	8	13	1	1
Argentina	4	2	0	2	83	18	13	6	2	1
Fiji	4	2	0	2	−16	10	6	12	0	3
Samoa	4	2	0	2	21	18	12	8	0	1
Italy	4	2	0	2	−46	5	5	14	0	2
United States	4	1	0	3	−39	9	7	9	0	1
Canada	4	1	0	3	−81	4	2	9	1	1
Romania	4	1	0	3	−127	8	5	5	0	1
Uruguay	4	1	0	3	−199	6	4	6	0	0
Japan	4	0	0	4	−84	6	5	12	1	0
Tonga	4	0	0	4	−132	7	4	1	0	4
Georgia	4	0	0	4	−154	1	1	12	1	2
Namibia	4	0	0	4	−282	4	4	0	0	1

Source: RugbyWorldCup.com

== Top point scorers ==
Top 10 point scorers
Player	Team	Position	Played	Tries	Conversions	Penalties	Drop goals	Total points	Yellow cards
Jonny Wilkinson	England	Fly-half	6	0	10	23	8	113	0
Frédéric Michalak	France	Fly-half	6	2	17	18	1	101	0
Elton Flatley	Australia	Centre	6	1	16	21	0	100	0
Leon MacDonald	New Zealand	Centre	7	4	20	5	0	75	0
Chris Paterson	Scotland	Fly-half	5	3	7	13	1	71	0
Mat Rogers	Australia	Full-back	7	5	16	0	0	57	1
Mike Hercus	United States	Fly-half	4	2	7	9	0	51	0
Rima Wakarua	Italy	Fly-half	3	0	4	14	0	50	0
Earl Va'a	Samoa	Fly-half	4	1	10	8	0	49	0
Dan Carter	New Zealand	Fly-half	5	2	19	0	0	48	0

Source: RugbyWorldCup.com

== Top try scorers ==
Top 10 try scorers
Player	Team	Position	Played	Tries	Conv	Penalties	Drop goals	Total points	Yellow cards	Red cards
Doug Howlett	New Zealand	Wing	7	7	0	0	0	35	0	0
Mils Muliaina	New Zealand	Full-back	7	7	0	0	0	35	0	0
Joe Rokocoko	New Zealand	Wing	5	6	0	0	0	30	0	0
Will Greenwood	England	Centre	6	5	0	0	0	25	0	0
Chris Latham	Australia	Full-back	1	5	0	0	0	25	0	0
Josh Lewsey	England	Full-back	5	5	0	0	0	25	0	0
Mat Rogers	Australia	Full-back	7	5	16	0	0	57	1	0
Lote Tuqiri	Australia	Wing	7	5	0	0	0	25	0	0
Pablo Bouza	Argentina	Number 8	2	4	0	0	0	20	0	0
Christophe Dominici	France	Wing	5	4	0	0	0	20	1	0
Caleb Ralph	New Zealand	Wing	4	4	0	0	0	20	0	0

Source: RugbyWorldCup.com

== Hat-tricks ==
Unless otherwise noted, players in this list scored a hat-trick of tries.

No.	Player	For	Against	Stage	Result	Venue	Date
1	Yannick Jauzion	France	Fiji	Pool	61–18	Lang Park, Brisbane	11 October 2003
2	Joost van der Westhuizen	South Africa	Uruguay	Pool	72–6	Subiaco Oval, Perth	11 October 2003
3	Martín Gaitán	Argentina	Namibia	Pool	67–14	Central Coast Stadium, Gosford	14 October 2003
4	Mils Muliaina^{T4}	New Zealand	Canada	Pool	68–6	Docklands Stadium, Melbourne	17 October 2003
5	Mat Rogers	Australia	Romania	Pool	90–8	Lang Park, Brisbane	18 October 2003
6	Matt Giteau	Australia	Namibia	Pool	142–0	Adelaide Oval	25 October 2003
7	Chris Latham^{T5}	Australia	Namibia	Pool	142–0	Adelaide Oval	25 October 2003
8	Lote Tuqiri	Australia	Namibia	Pool	142–0	Adelaide Oval	25 October 2003
9	Brian Liebenberg	France	United States	Pool	41–14	Wollongong Showground	31 October 2003
10	Josh Lewsey^{T5}	England	Uruguay	Pool	111–13	Lang Park, Brisbane	2 November 2003
11	Jonny Wilkinson^{D3}	England	France	Semi-final	24–7	Telstra Stadium, Sydney	16 November 2003

Key
^{D3}	Scored hat-trick of drop goals
^{T4}	Scored four tries
^{T5}	Scored five tries

== Stadiums ==
Stadium	City	Capacity	Matches played	Overall attendance	Average attendance per match	Average attendance as % of capacity	Tries scored	Avg. tries scored / match	Overall points scored	Avg. points scored / match
Stadium Australia	Sydney	83,500	7	550,895	78,699	94.25%	32	4.57	335	47.86
Docklands Stadium	Melbourne	56,347	7	284,209	40,601	72.06%	45	6.43	394	56.29
Lang Park	Brisbane	52,500	9	406,340	45,149	86.00%	80	8.89	654	72.67
Subiaco Oval	Perth	42,922	5	124,768	24,954	58.14%	43	8.60	327	65.40
Sydney Football Stadium	Sydney	42,500	5	169,076	33,815	79.56%	32	6.40	267	53.40
Adelaide Oval	Adelaide	33,597	2	56,999	28,500	84.83%	23	11.50	173	86.50
Willows Sports Complex	Townsville	26,500	3	57,748	19,249	72.64%	20	6.67	177	59.00
Canberra Stadium	Canberra	25,011	4	81,929	20,482	77.29%	15	3.75	170	42.50
Central Coast Stadium	Gosford	20,059	3	56,663	18,888	94.16%	26	8.67	208	69.33
York Park	Launceston	19,891	1	15,457	15,457	77.71%	6	6.00	44	44.00
Wollongong Showground	Wollongong	18,484	2	33,463	16,732	90.52%	10	5.00	86	43.00
Total		2,242,313	48	1,837,547	38,282	81.95%	332	6.92	2,835	59.06

=== Attendances ===
Top 10 highest attendances.

Rank	Attendance	Match	Venue	City	Date
1	82,957	Australia vs England	Stadium Australia	Sydney	22 November 2003
2	82,444	New Zealand vs Australia	Stadium Australia	Sydney	15 November 2003
3	82,346	England vs France	Stadium Australia	Sydney	16 November 2003
4	81,350	Australia vs Argentina	Stadium Australia	Sydney	10 October 2003
5	80,112	New Zealand vs Wales	Stadium Australia	Sydney	2 November 2003
6	78,974	France vs Scotland	Stadium Australia	Sydney	25 October 2003
7	62,712	France vs New Zealand	Stadium Australia	Sydney	20 November 2003
8	54,206	Australia vs Ireland	Docklands Stadium	Melbourne	1 November 2003
9	50,647	England vs Samoa	Docklands Stadium	Melbourne	26 October 2003
10	48,778	Australia vs Romania	Lang Park	Brisbane	18 October 2003
Last updated: 22 November 2003

- Lowest attendance: 15,457 – Namibia vs Romania, York Park, Launceston, 30 October 2003

== See also ==
- 2007 Rugby World Cup statistics
- Records and statistics of the Rugby World Cup
- List of Rugby World Cup hat-tricks
