= 1995 Rugby World Cup statistics =

This article documents statistics from the 1995 Rugby World Cup, hosted in South Africa from 25 May to 24 June.

== Team statistics ==
The following table shows the team's results in major statistical categories.

Team statistics
Team	Played	Won	Drawn	Lost	Points difference	Tries	Conversions	Penalties	Drop goals
South Africa	6	6	0	0	77	13	8	18	3
France	6	5	0	1	97	17	9	26	1
New Zealand	6	5	0	1	208	41	34	14	4
England	6	4	0	2	12	11	8	25	4
Australia	4	2	0	2	43	12	11	9	0
Ireland	4	2	0	2	−25	13	11	6	0
Western Samoa	4	2	0	2	−20	14	8	8	0
Scotland	4	2	0	2	104	20	14	17	0
Canada	3	1	0	2	−5	4	2	6	1
Italy	3	1	0	2	−25	7	5	7	1
Tonga	3	1	0	2	−46	6	4	2	0
Wales	3	1	0	2	21	9	7	8	2
Argentina	3	0	0	3	−18	8	4	7	0
Ivory Coast	3	0	0	3	−143	3	1	4	0
Japan	3	0	0	3	−197	8	6	1	0
Romania	3	0	0	3	−83	1	0	2	1

Source: ESPNscrum.com

== Top point scorers ==
Top 10 point scorers
Player	Team	Position	Played	Tries	Conversions	Penalties	Drop goals	Total points
Thierry Lacroix	France	Fly-half	6	4	7	26	0	112
Gavin Hastings	Scotland	Full-back	4	5	14	17	0	104
Andrew Mehrtens	New Zealand	First five-eighth	5	1	14	14	3	84
Rob Andrew	England	Fly-half	5	0	5	20	3	79
Joel Stransky	South Africa	Fly-half	5	1	4	13	3	61
Michael Lynagh	Australia	Fly-half	3	2	5	9	0	47
Simon Culhane	New Zealand	First five-eighth	1	1	20	0	0	45
Neil Jenkins	Wales	Fly-half	3	0	7	8	1	41
Diego Domínguez	Italy	Fly-half	3	1	5	7	1	39
Marc Ellis	New Zealand	Wing	5	7	0	0	0	35
Jonah Lomu	New Zealand	Wing	5	7	0	0	0	35

== Top try scorers ==
Top 10 try scorers
Player	Team	Position	Played	Tries	Conv	Penalties	Drop goals	Total points
Jonah Lomu	New Zealand	Wing	5	7	0	0	0	35
Marc Ellis	New Zealand	Wing	5	7	0	0	0	35
Gavin Hastings	Scotland	Fullback	4	5	14	17	0	104
Rory Underwood	England	Wing	6	5	0	0	0	25
Adriaan Richter	South Africa	Number 8	3	4	0	0	0	20
Chester Williams	South Africa	Wing	3	4	0	0	0	20
Thierry Lacroix	France	Fly-half	6	4	7	26	0	112
Émile Ntamack	France	Wing	5	3	0	0	0	15
Eric Rush	New Zealand	Wing	2	3	0	0	0	15
Gareth Thomas	Wales	Centre	3	3	0	0	0	15

== Hat-tricks ==
Unless otherwise noted, players in this list scored a hat-trick of tries.

No.	Player	For	Against	Stage	Result	Venue	Date
1	Gavin Hastings^{T4}	Scotland	Ivory Coast	Pool	89–0	Olympia Park, Rustenburg	26 May 1995
2	Gareth Thomas	Wales	Japan	Pool	57–10	Free State Stadium, Bloemfontein	27 May 1995
3	Marc Ellis^{T6}	New Zealand	Japan	Pool	145–17	Free State Stadium, Bloemfontein	4 June 1995
4	Eric Rush	New Zealand	Japan	Pool	145–17	Free State Stadium, Bloemfontein	4 June 1995
5	Jeff Wilson	New Zealand	Japan	Pool	145–17	Free State Stadium, Bloemfontein	4 June 1995
6	Chester Williams^{T4}	South Africa	Samoa	Quarter-final	42–14	Ellis Park, Johannesburg	10 June 1995
7	Jonah Lomu^{T4}	New Zealand	England	Semi-final	45–29	Newlands, Cape Town	18 June 1995

Key
^{T4}	Scored four tries
^{T6}	Scored six tries

== Stadiums ==
Stadium	City	Capacity	Matches played	Overall attendance	Average attendance per match	Average attendance as % of capacity	Tries scored	Avg. tries scored / match	Overall points scored	Avg. points scored / match
Ellis Park	Johannesburg	60,000	5	237,039	47,408	79.01%	24	4.80	235	47.00
Loftus Versfeld	Pretoria	50,000	5	154,000	30,800	61.60%	22	4.40	241	48.20
Newlands	Cape Town	50,000	4	168,640	42,160	84.32%	19	4.75	195	48.75
Kings Park Stadium	Durban	50,000	5	184,866	36,973	73.95%	16	3.20	237	47.40
Free State Stadium	Bloemfontein	40,000	3	55,000	18,333	45.83%	43	14.33	307	102.33
Boet Erasmus Stadium	Port Elizabeth	38,950	3	55,000	18,333	47.07%	9	3.00	95	31.67
Olympia Park	Rustenburg	30,000	3	45,000	15,000	50.00%	28	9.33	201	67.00
Basil Kenyon Stadium	East London	22,000	3	23,399	7,800	35.45%	20	6.67	174	58.00
Danie Craven Stadium	Stellenbosch	16,000	1	15,542	15,542	97.14%	6	6.00	45	45.00
Total		1,408,850	32	938,486	29,328	66.61%	187	5.84	1,730	54.06

== See also ==
- 1999 Rugby World Cup statistics
- Records and statistics of the Rugby World Cup
- List of Rugby World Cup hat-tricks
