= Strathearn School =

Location
- 188 Belmont Road; Belfast, County Antrim, BT4 2AU; Northern Ireland; 54.602°N 5.862°W

Information
- Type: Voluntary grammar school
- Motto: Encourage – Empower – Excel
- Established: 1929; 97 years ago
- Status: Open
- Principal: Nicola Connery
- Gender: Girls
- Age range: 11–18
- Houses: Barbour; Boucher; McCaughey; Watts
- School fees: £365 per academic year (2024/25)
- Website: www.strathearn.org.uk

Strathearn School is an 11–18 girls' voluntary grammar school in Belfast, County Antrim, Northern Ireland.

== History ==
In 1864, 17 acres (69,000 m^{2}) of land were bought by William Mullan and Robert Mullan, on which Strathearn House was built. In 1904, Mullan sold the house to Alexander Taylor, who died in October 1928. The house was then sold to the Victoria College girls' school, based in south Belfast, and which opened Strathearn School in 1929 to serve as a junior school, serving the Belmont and Knock areas. The initial enrolment was 63 pupils.

Miss Miskelly, who taught classics at Victoria, became the first headmistress. At this time, the school was co-educational. Boys, however, left the school at age eight, with most moving to Cabin Hill boys' school, while the girls stayed until fourteen, after which they could move to Victoria.

During the Second World War, the school was evacuated to the Argory, near Dungannon, and then to Portballintrae. In 1950, a separate Strathearn Committee of Victoria College was established and Strathearn adopted its own distinct uniform of green, fawn and wine. In 1952, Penrhyn House was bought and converted into a preparatory department. By 1980, there were 469 pupils in the secondary school; this grew to 759 by 1997. In 1987, the house beside was also bought to serve as another school building.

In 1988, the control of the school by the founding Victoria College was relinquished and Strathearn School was established with its own board of governors.

The school was completely rebuilt in 2016. In 2018, the Chamber Choir became the Songs Of Praise Senior Young Choir Of The Year after coming runners-up in the old format in 2015.

Strathearn School is affiliated with Campbell College, a boys' voluntary grammar school also on the Belmont Road.

== Principals ==
| No. | Name | Tenure |
|---|---|---|
| 1 | Edith Miskelly | 1929–1944 |
| 2 | Adelaide Rodden | 1944–1958 |
| 3 | Eileen Hamilton | 1958–1979 |
| 4 | Audrey Lamb | 1979–1997 |
| 5 | David Manning | 1997–2016 |
| 6 | Nicola Connery | 2017–present |

== Notable alumni ==
- Lucy Caldwell, playwright and author
- Andrea Catherwood, newsreader
- Wendy Erskine, author and head of English
- Brenda Kenyon, international fencer and former head of modern languages
- Sycerika McMahon, international swimmer
- Margaret Mountford, businesswoman
