= 2007 Rugby World Cup statistics =

This article documents statistics from the 2007 Rugby World Cup, held in France from 7 September to 20 October.

== Team statistics ==
The following table shows the team's results in some categories. Two red cards were issued during the tournament.

Points	Team	Matches	Tries	Con	Pen	Drop	Yellow card	Red card
327	New Zealand	5	48	36	5	0	2	0
278	South Africa	7	33	25	21	0	3	0
227	France	7	27	19	18	0	2	0
225	Australia	5	31	20	8	2	2	0
209	Argentina	7	23	14	18	4	3	0
168	Wales	4	23	16	7	0	0	0
140	England	7	12	7	17	5	1	0
134	Fiji	5	16	12	10	0	3	0
129	Scotland	5	15	15	8	0	1	0
89	Tonga	4	9	7	10	0	3	1
85	Italy	4	8	6	11	0	3	0
69	Samoa	4	5	4	12	0	1	0
64	Ireland	4	9	5	2	1	2	0
64	Japan	4	7	4	7	0	0	0
61	United States	4	7	4	6	0	4	0
51	Canada	4	6	3	5	0	1	0
50	Georgia	4	5	5	5	0	2	0
40	Romania	4	5	3	3	0	1	0
38	Portugal	4	4	3	3	1	1	0
30	Namibia	4	3	3	2	1	0	1

Source: RugbyWorldCup.com

== Player records ==
=== Most points ===
Note: ranked according to points then number of appearances

Top 10 point scorers
Points	Name	Team	Pos	Apps	Tries	Con	Pen	Drop
105	Percy Montgomery	South Africa	FB	7	2	22	17	0
91	Felipe Contepomi	Argentina	CE	7	3	11	18	0
67	Jonny Wilkinson	England	FH	5	0	5	14	5
50	Nick Evans	New Zealand	FH/FB	4	2	20	0	0
47	Jean-Baptiste Élissalde	France	SH	7	1	12	6	0
46	Chris Paterson	Scotland	WG/FH	5	1	10	7	0
44	Pierre Hola	Tonga	FH	4	0	7	10	0
43	Lionel Beauxis	France	FH	6	1	7	8	0
42	Nicky Little	Fiji	FH	3	0	9	8	0
40	Dan Carter	New Zealand	FH	3	1	10	5	0
40	Matt Giteau	Australia	CE	4	3	8	3	0
40	Bryan Habana	South Africa	WG	7	8	0	0	0

Key: Pos = position; Apps = appearances; Con = conversions; Pen = penalties; Drop = drop goals

Source: RugbyWorldCup.com

=== Most tries ===
Top 10 try scorers
Rank	Name	Team	Pos	Apps	Tries
1	Bryan Habana	South Africa	WG	7	8
2	Drew Mitchell	Australia	WG	5	7
3	Doug Howlett	New Zealand	WG	3	6
3	Shane Williams	Wales	WG	4	6
5	Joe Rokocoko	New Zealand	WG	3	5
5	Vincent Clerc	France	WG	5	5
5	Chris Latham	Australia	FB	5	5
8	Rory Lamont	Scotland	FB	4	4
8	Sitiveni Sivivatu	New Zealand	WG	4	4
8	Jaque Fourie	South Africa	CE	6	4
8	Paul Sackey	England	WG	6	4
8	JP Pietersen	South Africa	WG	7	4
8	Juan Smith	South Africa	FL	7	4

Key: Pos = position; Apps = appearances

== Discipline ==
=== Citing/bans ===
There was some controversy over post-match citings by IRB Citing Commissioners because of apparent inconsistencies between disciplinary sanctions.

List of citings
Ban (weeks)	Player	Nation	Opponent	Offence
7	Otar Eloshvili	Georgia	France	spear tackle
5	Paul Emerick	United States	England	spear tackle
4	Juan Severino Somoza	Portugal	Scotland	head-butting
3	Brian Lima	Samoa	England	high tackle
2	Schalk Burger	South Africa	Samoa	dangerous play
2	Phil Vickery	England	United States	tripping
2	Mirco Bergamasco	Italy	Scotland	tripping
1	Hale T-Pole	Tonga	Samoa	striking
1	Jacques Nieuwenhuis	Namibia	France	high tackle
1	Alfie Vaeluaga	Samoa	South Africa	high tackle
1	Seremaia Bai	Fiji	South Africa	dangerous tackle
cleared	François Steyn	South Africa	Tonga	foul play
cleared	Sione Lauaki	New Zealand	Romania	dangerous tackle

== Hat-tricks ==
Unless otherwise noted, players in this list scored a hat-trick of tries.

No.	Player	For	Against	Stage	Result	Venue	Date
1	Doug Howlett	New Zealand	Italy	Pool	76–14	Stade Vélodrome, Marseille	8 September 2007
2	Rocky Elsom	Australia	Japan	Pool	91–3	Stade de Gerland, Lyon	8 September 2007
3	Bryan Habana^{T4}	South Africa	Samoa	Pool	59–7	Parc des Princes, Paris	9 September 2007
4	Vincent Clerc	France	Namibia	Pool	87–10	Stadium Municipal, Toulouse	16 September 2007
5	Ally Hogg	Scotland	Romania	Pool	42–0	Murrayfield, Edinburgh	18 September 2007
6	Drew Mitchell	Australia	Fiji	Pool	55–12	Stade de la Mosson, Montpellier	23 September 2007
7	Joe Rokocoko	New Zealand	Romania	Pool	85–8	Stadium Municipal, Toulouse	29 September 2007
8	Juan Martín Hernández^{D3}	Argentina	Ireland	Pool	30–15	Parc des Princes, Paris	30 September 2007

Key
^{D3}	Scored hat-trick of drop goals
^{T4}	Scored four tries

== Stadiums ==
Stadium	City	Capacity	Matches played	Overall attendance	Average attendance per match	Average attendance as % of capacity	Tries scored	Avg. tries scored / match	Overall points scored	Avg. points scored / match
Stade de France	Saint-Denis	80,000	7	551,736	78,819	98.52%	14	2.00	219	31.29
Millennium Stadium	Cardiff	74,500	4	222,936	55,734	74.81%	28	7.00	225	56.25
Murrayfield	Edinburgh	67,144	2	95,780	47,890	71.32%	12	6.00	82	41.00
Stade Vélodrome	Marseille	59,500	6	331,660	55,277	92.90%	44	7.33	348	58.00
Parc des Princes	Paris	47,870	5	228,544	45,709	95.49%	29	5.80	247	49.40
Stade Félix-Bollaert	Lens	41,400	3	109,373	36,458	88.06%	14	4.67	123	41.00
Stade de Gerland	Lyon	41,100	3	121,012	40,337	98.14%	34	11.33	251	83.67
Stade de la Beaujoire	Nantes	38,100	3	111,602	37,201	97.64%	22	7.33	197	65.67
Stadium de Toulouse	Toulouse	35,700	4	140,973	35,243	98.72%	38	9.50	280	70.00
Stade Geoffroy-Guichard	Saint-Étienne	35,650	3	102,987	34,329	96.29%	15	5.00	146	48.67
Stade Chaban-Delmas	Bordeaux	34,440	4	136,511	34,128	99.09%	20	5.00	140	35.00
Stade de la Mosson	Montpellier	33,900	4	110,109	27,527	81.20%	26	6.50	220	55.00
Total		2,473,548	48	2,263,223	47,150	91.50%	296	6.17	2,478	51.63

== See also ==
- 2011 Rugby World Cup statistics
- Records and statistics of the Rugby World Cup
- List of Rugby World Cup hat-tricks
