= Cambridge House Grammar School =

Coordinates: 54.851°N 6.227°W

- Ballymena, County Antrim, BT42 2EL; Northern Ireland

Information
- Type: Grammar school
- Motto: Per Laborem
- Established: September 2001
- Local authority: Education Authority
- Principal: Richard Marsh
- Gender: Mixed
- Age: 11 to 18
- Enrolment: 900
- Houses: 6
- Colours: Green and red
- Website: https://www.cambridgehouse.org.uk

Cambridge House Grammar School is a mixed grammar school in the County Antrim town of Ballymena, Northern Ireland, within the North Eastern Region of the Education Authority.

== General ==
The school is in Ballymena's Galgorm Road area at a mature site surrounded by gardens and playing fields. The main school buildings are contemporary and the campus was refurbished in 2001. The Technology and Design Suite building is the most recent addition to the school. The school has a separate Drama and Music annexe (the former preparatory department) and a self-contained, Sixth Form Centre complete with both private and communal study areas, a common room and a coffee shop.

== The House System ==
Cambridge House Grammar School (CHGS) is split into six houses (there were four in the former Cambridge House Boy's Grammar School—Adair, Eaton, Raphael and Chichester), and the pastoral care of each pupil is enforced by this system. The house system is based on patrons who are successful in a wide range of expertise, such as music, sports, business, science and the arts. The ethos behind the house system is that each pupil can relate to a smaller unit within the school and have a sense of identity. House Captains are elected in Year 14.

The houses and their original patrons are listed below.

- Jones House: Marie Jones, Belfast–born playwright.
- Burnell House: Professor Dame Jocelyn Bell Burnell, physicist.
- Bell House: George Derek Fleetwood Bell, MBE, musician.
- Abercorn House: Sacha, Duchess of Abercorn, OBE
- Patton House: David Patton, local businessman.
- Robinson House: Brian Robinson, former Ulster and Ireland rugby player and past pupil.

== Heads ==
Name	Tenure
Miss Sache Thompson	1969–1972
Brenda Berner, nee Kenyon	1972–1976

== Principals ==
No.	Name	Tenure
1	Charles Mills	2001–2003
2	Eileen Lisk	2004–2011
3	Elma Lutton	2012–2020
4	Phillip Elliott	2021–2023
5	Richard Marsh	2023–present

== Notable former pupils ==
- Adrian McCoubrey, professional cricketer, held the office of Deputy Head Boy 1997–98
- Brian Robinson, rugby player, Ireland international
- Jamie Smith, Ulster Rugby full-back, Smith completed five years at the school
- Carol Graham, contemporary artist
- Neve Jones, professional rugby player for Gloucester-Hartpury in the PWR, Ulster at the regional level, and Ireland at the international level. Tried to form a girls' rugby team for the school but was rejected.
