= Carol Graham (artist) =

Irish contemporary artist

- Born: 17 April 1951 (age 75); Belfast
- Occupation: Portrait painter
- Website: www.carolgrahamartist.com

Carol Graham (born 1951) is an Irish contemporary artist.

== Biography ==
Carol Graham was born in Belfast in 1951. She was educated in Cambridge House School, Ballymena before going on to study in the Belfast College of Art from 1970 to 1975. Graham is a portrait artist and has been commissioned to complete portraits for, among others, the barrister John P.B. Maxwell by the Bar Council of Northern Ireland as well James Galway, President Mary Robinson and President Mary McAleese. She began her career with a Arts Council bursary for the purchase of photographic equipment in 1976 and a commission for a portrait of Gloria Hunniford. Graham has also had a number of solo exhibitions including at The Arts Council Gallery, Belfast; The Tom Caldwell Gallery, Belfast and The Engine Room, Belfast; The Guinness Hop Store, Dublin; Elaine Somers Gallery, Holywood, and the Naughton Gallery at Queen’s. She is a member of The Royal Ulster Academy of Arts and was president from 2003 to 2006. Graham was awarded a Gold medal by the Royal Ulster Academy in both 1985 and 1996. Today her work includes landscapes and still lifes as well as portraits.
