= Brenda Kenyon =

Northern Irish fencer (born c.1932)

Personal information
- Nationality: British (Northern Irish)
- Born: c.1932 Belfast, Northern Ireland

Sport
- Sport: Fencing
- Event: Foil
- Club: Coleraine Fencing Club; Belfast FC; Ajax FC

Brenda Kenyon married name Berner (born c.1932) is a former fencer from Northern Ireland, who represented Northern Ireland at the British Empire and Commonwealth Games (now Commonwealth Games).

== Biography ==
Kenyon was educated Strathearn School and Victoria College and attended Queen's University Belfast. She was a member of the Coleraine Fencing Club and represented Northern Ireland in comeptition.

Kenyo was a teacher in Strathearn School in Belfast and holder of the Northern and Southern Ireland national titles and by 1957 had associations with both the Belfast Fencing Club and the Ajax Fencing Club.

She represented the 1958 Northern Irish Team at the 1958 British Empire and Commonwealth Games in Cardiff, Wales, participating in the foil event.

In 1962 Kenyon was still fencing and coaching for the Amateur Fencing Association and was head of modern languages at Strathearn School.

After teaching at Coleraine High School for two years, she became headmistress of the Cambridge House Grammar School in 1972 and then principal of Victoria College in 1976.
