= Victoria College, Belfast =

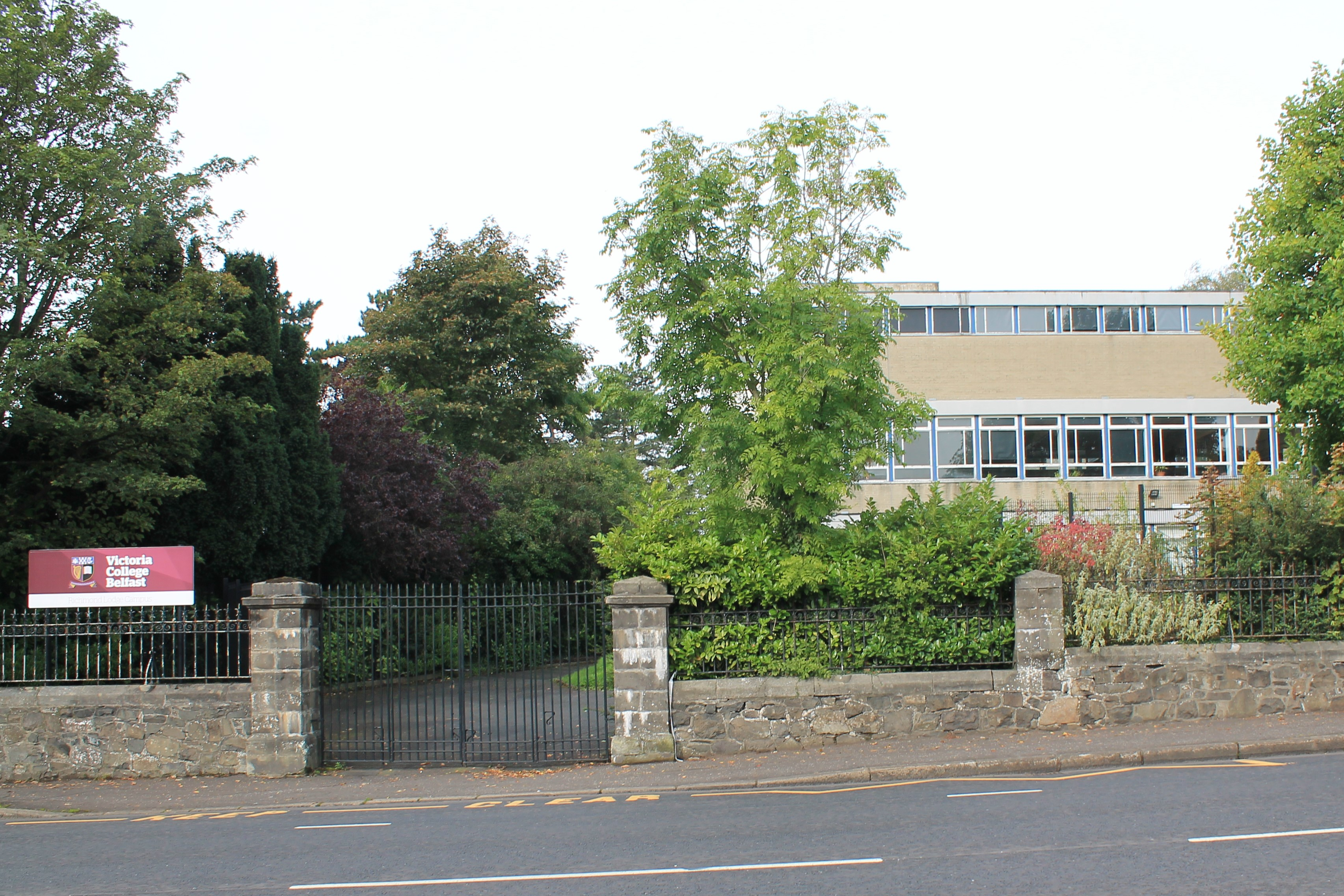

Location
- Cranmore Park; Belfast; Northern Ireland
- Coordinates: 54.573°N 5.949°W

Information
- Type: Voluntary independent grammar school
- Motto: Honor Fidelitatis Praemium (Honour is the reward of loyalty)
- Established: 1859; 167 years ago
- Founder: Margaret Byers
- Principal: Mrs Karen Quinn
- Age: 3 to 19
- Enrollment: 175 aged 3–10; 867 aged 11–19
- Houses: Crescent; Wellington; Marlborough; Richmond; Howard
- Alumnae: Old Victorians
- Website: www.victoriacollege.org.uk

Victoria College, Belfast is a voluntary non-denominational independent grammar school in Cranmore Park, Belfast, Northern Ireland. In 2022, the college's stated enrolment was 870.

Victoria College was awarded specialist school status in science in September 2009. The college also specialises in other STEM-related areas (Science, Technology, Engineering and Maths.)

== History ==
Founded by Mrs Margaret Byers (1832–1912) – an important pioneer of women's education in Ireland – in 1859, and first located in Belfast city centre at Wellington Place, the school was then known as The Ladies' Collegiate School, Belfast.

In 1888, Queen Victoria's Jubilee Year, the name of the school was changed by Royal Command to Victoria College and School. A century later, Victoria College amalgamated with Richmond Lodge School, a neighbouring girls' school of similar ethos. Richmond Lodge had opened in 1889 by the Misses Hardy on the Stranmillis Road. It moved to the Malone Road in 1913 and soon acquired full academic recognition. Richmond Lodge past pupils continue their association with the school through the Arellian Association.

From 1947 to 1970, the art department at Victoria College was headed by Mercy Hunter, a notable calligrapher and influential teacher.

Over the past 150 years, Victoria College (as it is now called) has relocated four times. Former Belfast locations include Howard Street, Pakenham Place and Lower Crescent before the current school was established at Cranmore in the 1970s. School house names reflect the past locations.

Brenda Berner became principal of Victoria College in 1976.

== Location ==
The school has two campuses: the Richmond Campus (for Forms 1 & 2) and the Cranmore Campus (for Forms 3-U6). In addition, a girls only Preparatory Department is located on the Cranmore Campus.

The whole school is situated within extensive mature grounds in South Belfast, between the Lisburn Road and the Malone Road, two main arterial routes making it convenient to city, town and country bus routes and the local railway network. It is also within walking distance of the Queen's University Belfast and the Ulster Museum and many local art galleries and theatres.

== Staff ==
The school is staffed by 82 full- and part-time teachers and 30 support staff.

== Principals ==
No.	Name	Tenure
1	Margaret Byers	1859-1912
2	Anna Matier	1912-1936
3	Grace Faris	1936-1951
4	Margaret Weir Cunningham	1951-1976
5	Brenda Berner	1976-1998
6	Margaret Andrews	1998-2005
7	Patricia Slevin	2005–2018
8	Karen Quinn	2018–present

== Boarding ==
Drumglass House was built in 1820 and serves as the Boarding Department for girls of all ages and all backgrounds. It is located within the grounds of the Cranmore Campus. The Boarding Department caters for up to 60 boarders, many from Europe or East Asia. Due to the covid-19 pandemic, Drumglass closed its doors in 2020, and has not reopened since.

== STEM related achievements ==
In 2010, a team of pupils from the College won their regional heat of the Faraday Challenge and subsequently took first prize at the National Finals held in Manchester.
