= Records and statistics of the Rugby World Cup =

Rugby World Cup records have been accumulating since the first Rugby World Cup tournament was held in 1987.

== Team records ==
=== Titles ===
Most titles won
Titles	Team	Tournaments
4	South Africa	1995, 2007, 2019, 2023
3	New Zealand	1987, 2011, 2015
2	Australia	1991, 1999
1	England	2003

=== Title win rate ===
Win rate
Win rate	Team
50%	South Africa
30%	New Zealand
20%	Australia
10%	England

=== Most semi-finals ===
Most semi-finals
App	Team	Tournaments
9	New Zealand	1987, 1991, 1995, 1999, 2003, 2011, 2015, 2019, 2023
6	Australia	1987, 1991, 1999, 2003, 2011, 2015
6	England	1991, 1995, 2003, 2007, 2019, 2023
6	France	1987, 1995, 1999, 2003, 2007, 2011
6	South Africa	1995, 1999, 2007, 2015, 2019, 2023

=== Most quarter-finals ===
Most quarter-finals
App	Team	Tournaments
10	New Zealand	1987, 1991, 1995, 1999, 2003, 2007, 2011, 2015, 2019, 2023
10	France	1987, 1991, 1995, 1999, 2003, 2007, 2011, 2015, 2019, 2023
9	Australia	1987, 1991, 1995, 1999, 2003, 2007, 2011, 2015, 2019
9	England	1987, 1991, 1995, 1999, 2003, 2007, 2011, 2019, 2023
8	Ireland	1987, 1991, 1995, 2003, 2011, 2015, 2019, 2023
8	South Africa	1995, 1999, 2003, 2007, 2011, 2015, 2019, 2023

=== Most appearances ===
Most appearances
App	Team(s)
10	Argentina, Australia, England, France, Ireland, Italy, Japan, New Zealand, Scotland, Wales
9	Canada, Fiji, Romania, Samoa, Tonga
8	South Africa, United States
7	Namibia
6	Georgia

- 10 teams appeared in every World Cup:
- Samoa/Western Samoa also qualified for every World Cup but was not invited to the 1987 Rugby World Cup.
- South Africa was banned from competing in 1987 and 1991 due to the sporting boycott of South Africa, but appeared in every World Cup since the ban was lifted.

=== Points ===
Most overall pool points by a team
Pool points	Team	Pld	W	D	L	PF	PA	PD	W%	TB	LB
238	New Zealand	64	54	1	9	2,888	842	+2,046	84.38	20	0
186	South Africa	50	42	0	8	1,720	641	+1,079	84.00	16	2
156	Australia	57	44	0	13	1,887	845	+1,042	77.19	15	2
153	England	58	42	1	15	1,790	822	+968	72.41	12	1
147	France	58	40	2	16	1,823	1,027	+796	68.97	13	3

Last updated: 28 October 2023

Most points by a team in a single match
Points	Team	Opponent	Score	Date
145	New Zealand	Japan	145–17	4 June 1995
142	Australia	Namibia	142–0	24 October 2003
111	England	Uruguay	111–13	2 November 2003
108	New Zealand	Portugal	108–13	15 September 2007
101	New Zealand	Italy	101–3	14 October 1999
101	England	Tonga	101–10	15 October 1999

=== Margins ===
Biggest winning margins
Margin	Team	Opponent	Score	Date
142	Australia	Namibia	142–0	24 October 2003
128	New Zealand	Japan	145–17	4 June 1995
98	New Zealand	Italy	101–3	14 October 1999
98	England	Uruguay	111–13	2 November 2003
96	France	Namibia	96–0	21 September 2023

=== Tries ===
Most tries by a team in a single match
Tries	Team	Opponent	Score	Date
22	Australia	Namibia	142–0	24 October 2003
21	New Zealand	Japan	145–17	4 June 1995
17	England	Uruguay	111–13	2 November 2003
16	New Zealand	Portugal	108–13	15 September 2007
14	New Zealand	Italy	101–3	14 October 1999
14	France	Namibia	96–0	21 September 2023
14	New Zealand	Italy	96–17	29 September 2023

== Player records ==
=== Points ===
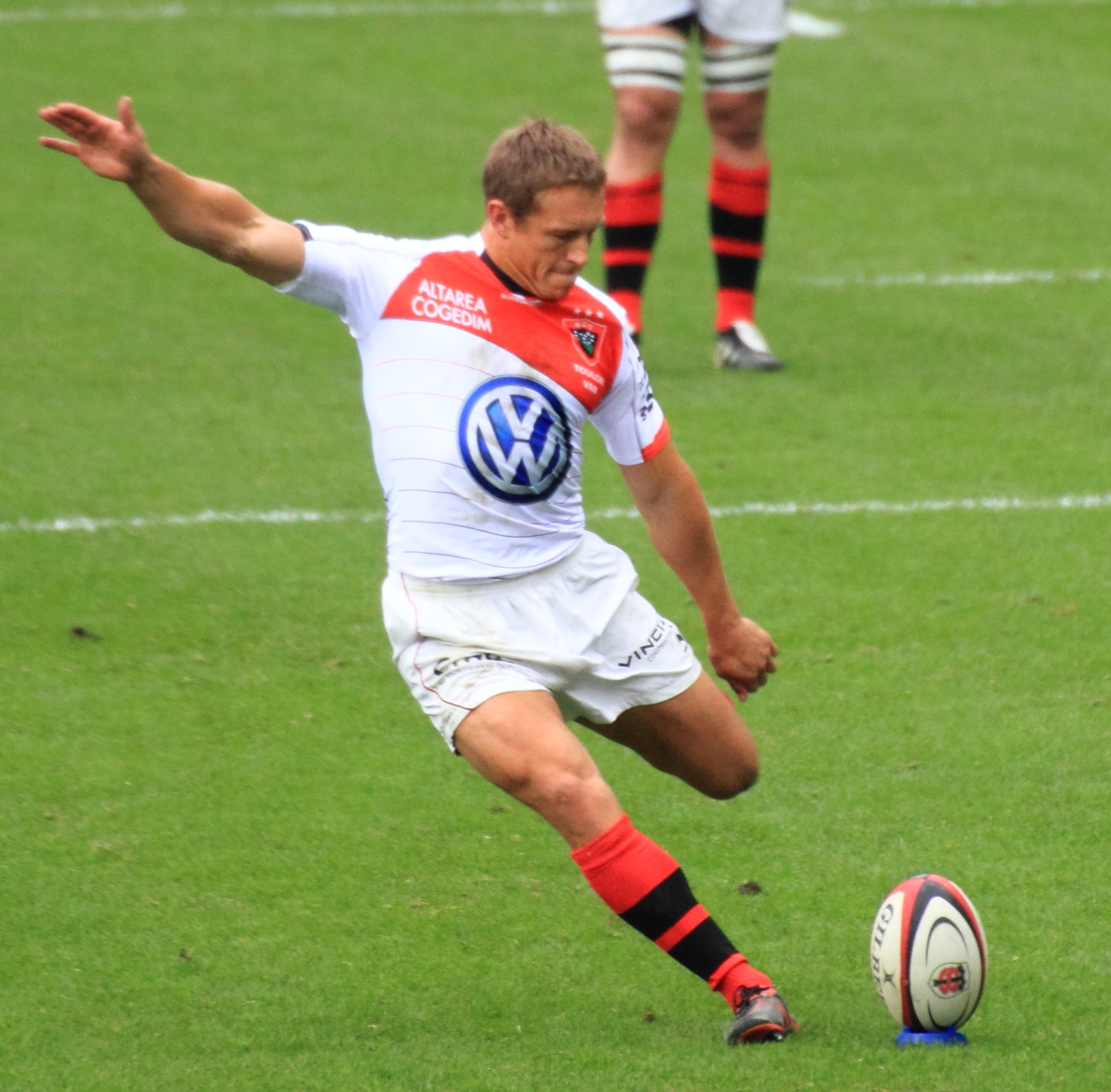
Jonny Wilkinson holds the record for the most points scored (277), most penalties (58) and most drop goals (14) in Rugby World Cups.

Most overall points
Points	Name	Team	App.	Tries	Con.	Pen.	Drop	Tournaments
277	Jonny Wilkinson	England	19	1	28	58	14	1999, 2003, 2007, 2011
227	Gavin Hastings	Scotland	13	9	39	36	0	1987, 1991, 1995
195	Handré Pollard	South Africa	17	0	24	46	3	2015, 2019, 2023
195	Michael Lynagh	Australia	15	4	36	33	2	1987, 1991, 1995
191	Dan Carter	New Zealand	15	3	58	17	3	2003, 2007, 2011, 2015

Key: App = Appearances. Con = conversions. Pen = penalties. Drop = drop goals.

Most points in one tournament
Points	Name	Team	Tournament
126	Grant Fox	New Zealand	1987
113	Jonny Wilkinson	England	2003
112	Thierry Lacroix	France	1995
105	Percy Montgomery	South Africa	2007
104	Gavin Hastings	Scotland	1995

Most points in a match by a player
Points	Name	Team	Opponent	Date
45	Simon Culhane	New Zealand	Japan	4 June 1995
44	Gavin Hastings	Scotland	Ivory Coast	26 May 1995
42	Mat Rogers	Australia	Namibia	25 October 2003
36	Tony Brown	New Zealand	Italy	14 October 1999
36	Paul Grayson	England	Tonga	15 October 1999

=== Tries ===
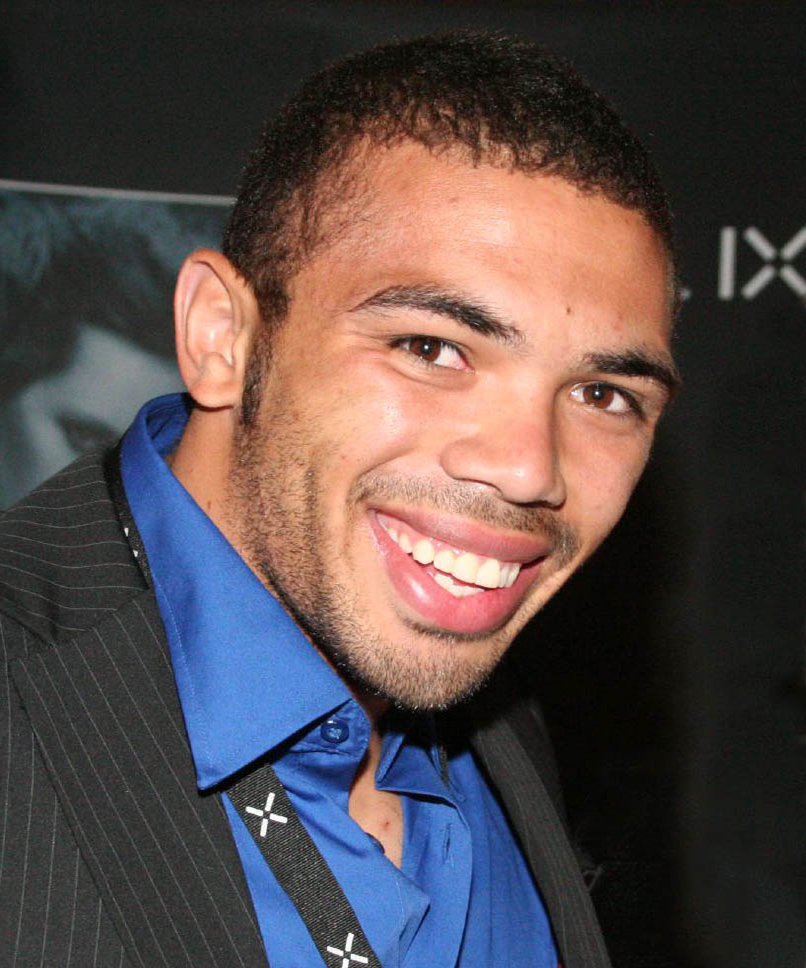
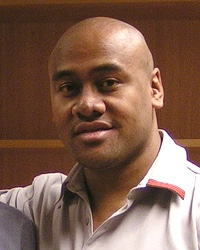
Bryan Habana and Jonah Lomu share the record for the most tries (15) in Rugby World Cups, and share the record for most tries in a single World Cup tournament (8) with Julian Savea and Will Jordan (below) for the men. However Portia Woodman-Wickliffe has scored the most tries in the world in one game at 13 tries in the Women's Rugby World Cup 2017 for the Black Ferns.

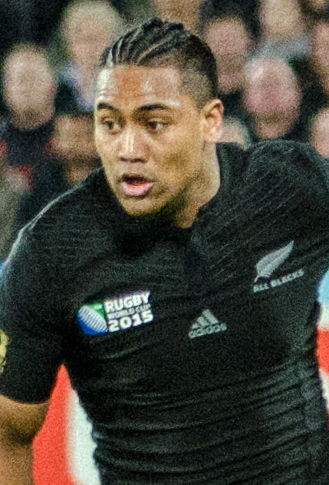
Julian Savea scored a joint record eight tries in New Zealand's progress to the 2015 final, including two hat-tricks

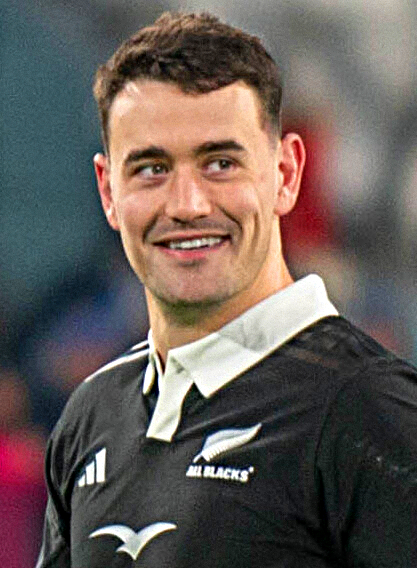
Will Jordan

Most overall tries
Tries	Name	Team	Tournaments
15	Jonah Lomu	New Zealand	1995–1999
15	Bryan Habana	South Africa	2007–2015
14	Drew Mitchell	Australia	2007–2015
13	Doug Howlett	New Zealand	2003–2007
12	Adam Ashley-Cooper	Australia	2007–2019

Most tries in one tournament
Tries	Name	Team	Tournament
8	Jonah Lomu	New Zealand	1999
8	Bryan Habana	South Africa	2007
8	Julian Savea	New Zealand	2015
8	Will Jordan	New Zealand	2023
7	Marc Ellis	New Zealand	1995
7	Jonah Lomu	New Zealand	1995
7	Doug Howlett	New Zealand	2003
7	Mils Muliaina	New Zealand	2003
7	Drew Mitchell	Australia	2007
7	Josh Adams	Wales	2019

Most tries in a match by a player
Tries	Name	Team	Opponent	Date
6	Marc Ellis	New Zealand	Japan	4 June 1995
5	Chris Latham	Australia	Namibia	25 October 2003
5	Josh Lewsey	England	Uruguay	2 November 2003
5	Henry Arundell	England	Chile	23 September 2023
4	John Gallagher	New Zealand	Fiji	27 May 1987
4	Craig Green	New Zealand	Fiji	27 May 1987
4	Ieuan Evans	Wales	Canada	3 June 1987
4	Brian Robinson	Ireland	Zimbabwe	6 October 1991
4	Gavin Hastings	Scotland	Ivory Coast	26 May 1995
4	Chester Williams	South Africa	Samoa	10 June 1995
4	Jonah Lomu	New Zealand	England	18 June 1995
4	Keith Wood	Ireland	United States	2 October 1999
4	Mils Muliaina	New Zealand	Canada	17 October 2003
4	Bryan Habana	South Africa	Samoa	9 September 2007
4	Vereniki Goneva	Fiji	Namibia	10 September 2011
4	Zac Guildford	New Zealand	Canada	2 October 2011
4	Darcy Graham	Scotland	Romania	30 September 2023

Youngest try scorer in a World Cup game

- George North (Wales), aged 19 years, 166 days (2 tries v Namibia, 26 September 2011)

Oldest try scorer in a World Cup game

- Diego Ormaechea (Uruguay), aged 40 years, 13 days (v Spain, 2 October 1999)

=== Conversions ===
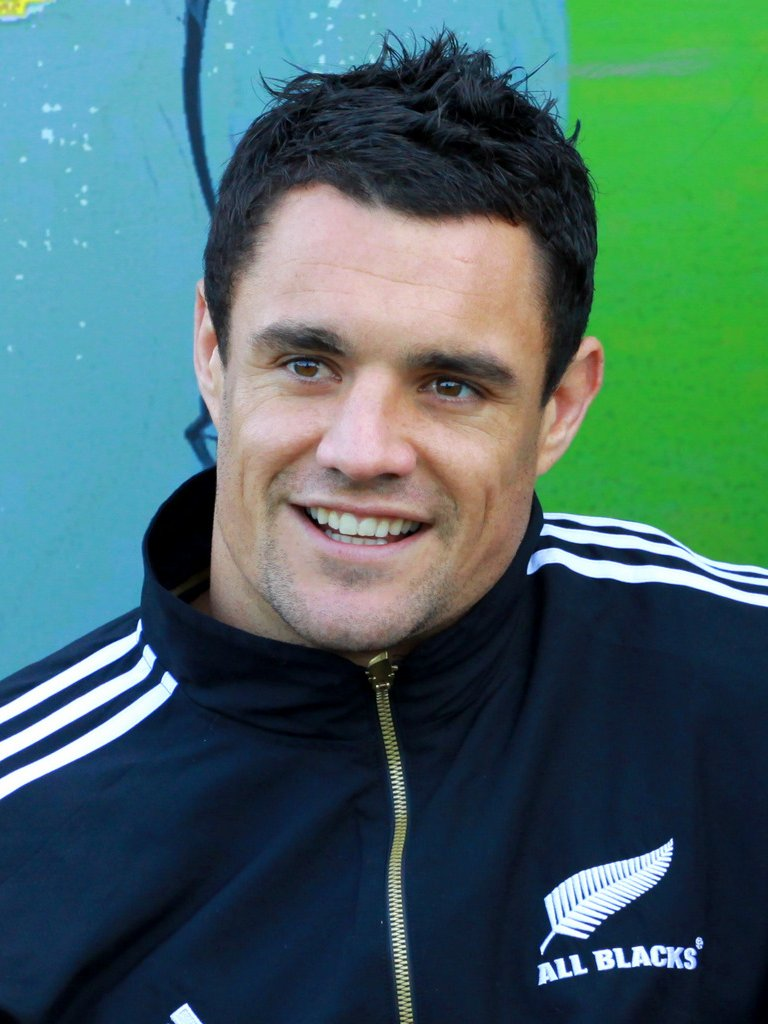
Dan Carter holds the record for the most conversions in Rugby World Cups.

Most overall conversions
Con.	Name	Team	Tournaments
58	Dan Carter	New Zealand	2003–2015
39	Gavin Hastings	Scotland	1987–1995
38	Richie Mo'unga	New Zealand	2019–2023
37	Grant Fox	New Zealand	1987–1991
36	Michael Lynagh	Australia	1987–1995

Most conversions in one tournament
Con.	Name	Team	Tournament
30	Grant Fox	New Zealand	1987
23	Dan Carter	New Zealand	2015
21	Thomas Ramos	France	2023
20	Michael Lynagh	Australia	1987
20	Simon Culhane	New Zealand	1995
20	Leon MacDonald	New Zealand	2003
20	Nick Evans	New Zealand	2007
20	Richie Mo'unga	New Zealand	2019

Most conversions in a match by a player
Con.	Name	Team	Opponent	Date
20	Simon Culhane	New Zealand	Japan	4 June 1995
16	Mat Rogers	Australia	Namibia	25 October 2003
14	Nick Evans	New Zealand	Portugal	15 September 2007
12	Paul Grayson	England	Tonga	15 October 1999
12	Leon MacDonald	New Zealand	Tonga	24 October 2003
12	Thomas Ramos	France	Namibia	21 September 2023

=== Penalty goals ===
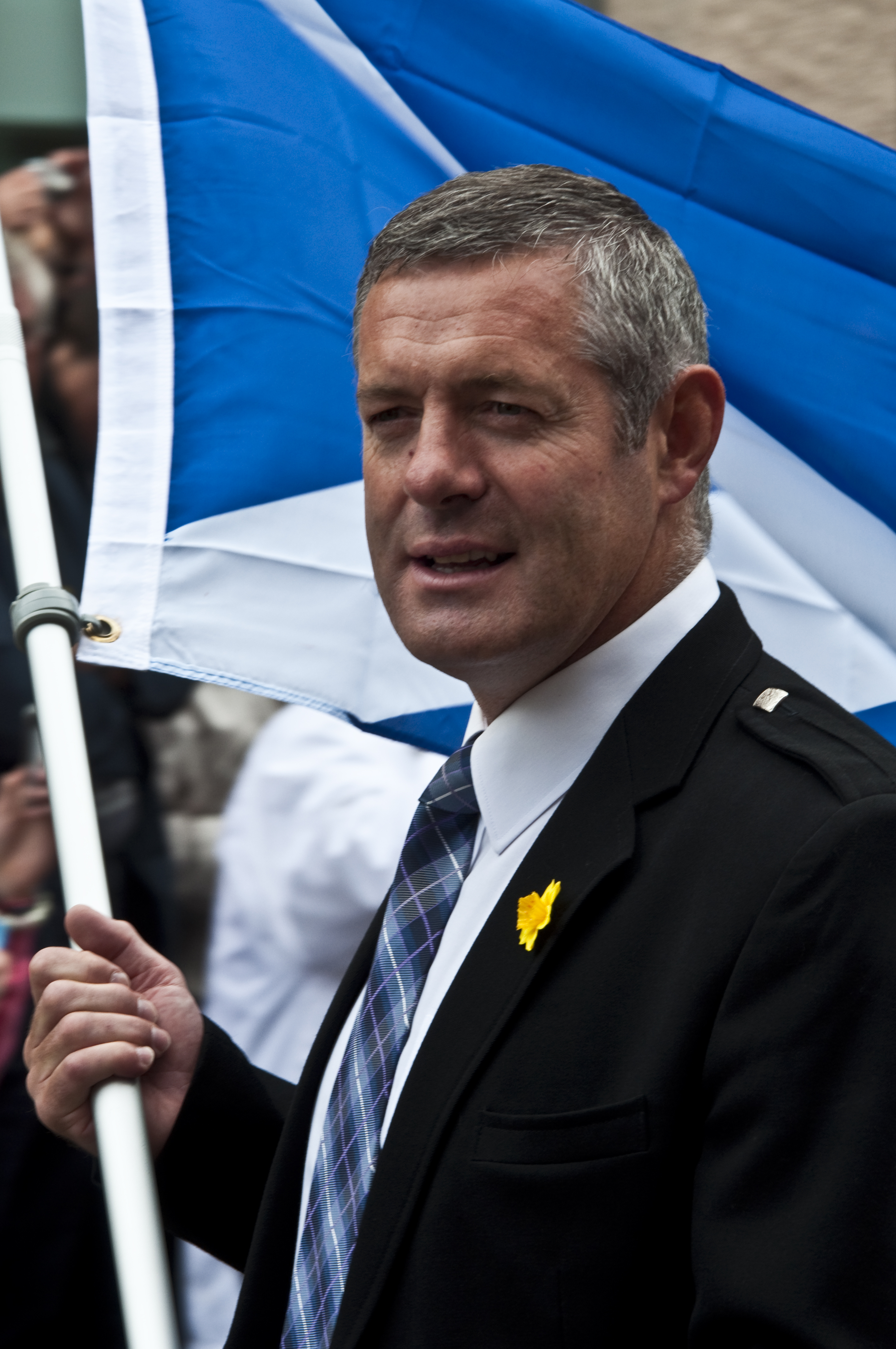
Scotland's Gavin Hastings was the first player to kick eight penalties in a Rugby World Cup match.

Most overall penalties
Pen.	Name	Team	Tournaments
58	Jonny Wilkinson	England	1999–2011
46	Handré Pollard	South Africa	2015–2023
36	Gavin Hastings	Scotland	1987–1995
35	Gonzalo Quesada	Argentina	1999–2003
33	Michael Lynagh	Australia	1987–1995
33	Andrew Mehrtens	New Zealand	1995–1999

Most penalties in one tournament
Pen.	Name	Team	Tournament
31	Gonzalo Quesada	Argentina	1999
26	Thierry Lacroix	France	1995
23	Jonny Wilkinson	England	2003
23	Handré Pollard	South Africa	2015
21	Grant Fox	New Zealand	1987
21	Elton Flatley	Australia	2003

Most penalties in a match by a player
Pen.	Name	Team	Opponent	Date
8	Gavin Hastings	Scotland	Tonga	30 May 1995
8	Thierry Lacroix	France	Ireland	10 June 1995
8	Gonzalo Quesada	Argentina	Samoa	10 October 1999
8	Matt Burke	Australia	South Africa	30 October 1999
7	Gonzalo Quesada	Argentina	Japan	16 October 1999
7	Jonny Wilkinson	England	Fiji	20 October 1999
7	David Humphreys	Ireland	Argentina	20 October 1999
7	Gonzalo Quesada	Argentina	Ireland	20 October 1999
7	Matt Burke	Australia	France	6 November 1999
7	Piri Weepu	New Zealand	Argentina	9 October 2011
7	Dan Biggar	Wales	England	26 September 2015

=== Drop goals ===
Most overall drop goals
Drop	Name	Team	Tournaments
14	Jonny Wilkinson	England	1999–2011
6	Jannie de Beer	South Africa	1999
5	Rob Andrew	England	1987–1995
5	Gareth Rees	Canada	1987–1999
4	Juan Martín Hernández	Argentina	2003–2015

Most drop goals in one tournament
Drop	Name	Team	Tournament
8	Jonny Wilkinson	England	2003
6	Jannie de Beer	South Africa	1999
5	Jonny Wilkinson	England	2007
4	Juan Martín Hernández	Argentina	2007
3	Jonathan Davies	Wales	1987
3	Rob Andrew	England	1995
3	Andrew Mehrtens	New Zealand	1995
3	Joel Stransky	South Africa	1995
3	Gregor Townsend	Scotland	1999
3	Theuns Kotzé	Namibia	2011
3	Dan Parks	Scotland	2011
3	George Ford	England	2023

Most drop goals in a match by a player
Drop	Name	Team	Opponent	Date
5	Jannie de Beer	South Africa	England	24 October 1999
3	Juan Martín Hernández	Argentina	Ireland	30 September 2007
3	George Ford	England	Argentina	9 September 2023
3	Theuns Kotzé	Namibia	Fiji	10 September 2011
3	Jonny Wilkinson	England	France	16 November 2003

=== Appearance statistics ===
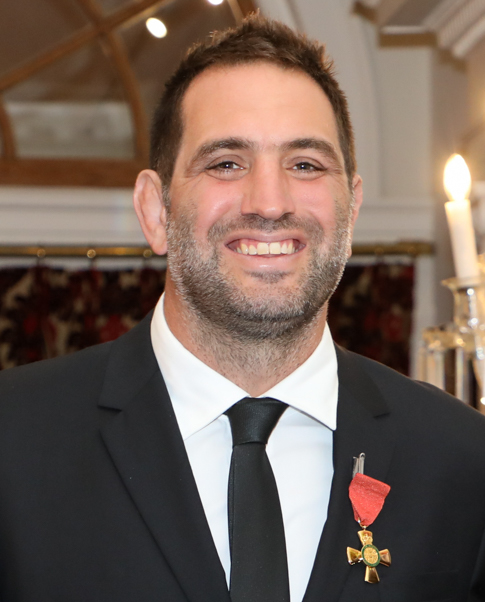
Sam Whitelock holds the appearance record in Rugby World Cups with 26 matches.

Most appearances, matches
App.	Name	Team	Tournaments
26	Sam Whitelock	New Zealand	2011–2023
22	Agustin Creevy	Argentina	2011–2023
22	Jason Leonard	England	1991–2003
22	Richie McCaw	New Zealand	2003–2015
21	Alun Wyn Jones	Wales	2007–2019
21	James Slipper	Australia	2011–2023

Most appearances, tournaments
App.	Name	Team	Tournaments
5	Brian Lima	Samoa	1991–2007
5	Mauro Bergamasco	Italy	1999–2015
5	Sergio Parisse	Italy	2003–2019
4	Gareth Rees	Canada	1987–1999
4	Pedro Sporleder	Argentina	1991–2003
4	Al Charron	Canada	1991–2003
4	Jason Leonard	England	1991–2003
4	Fabien Galthié	France	1991–2003
4	Carlo Checchinato	Italy	1991–2003
4	George Gregan	Australia	1995–2007
4	Mike James	Canada	1995–2007
4	Rod Snow	Canada	1995–2007
4	Mike Catt	England	1995–2007
4	Alessandro Troncon	Italy	1995–2007
4	Gareth Thomas	Wales	1995–2007
4	Romeo Gontineac	Romania	1995–2007
4	Felipe Contepomi	Argentina	1999–2011
4	Mario Ledesma	Argentina	1999–2011
4	Martín Scelzo	Argentina	1999–2011
4	Jonny Wilkinson	England	1999–2011
4	Nicky Little	Fiji	1999–2011
4	Brian O'Driscoll	Ireland	1999–2011
4	Chris Paterson	Scotland	1999–2011
4	Stephen Jones	Wales	1999–2011
4	James Pritchard	Canada	2003–2015
4	Jamie Cudmore	Canada	2003–2015
4	Giorgi Chkhaidze	Georgia	2003–2015
4	Merab Kvirikashvili	Georgia	2003–2015
4	Paul O'Connell	Ireland	2003–2015
4	Andrea Masi	Italy	2003–2015
4	Martin Castrogiovanni	Italy	2003–2015
4	Dan Carter	New Zealand	2003–2015
4	Keven Mealamu	New Zealand	2003–2015
4	Richie McCaw	New Zealand	2003–2015
4	Dănuț Dumbravă	Romania	2003–2015
4	Ovidiu Tonița	Romania	2003–2015
4	Paulică Ion	Romania	2003–2015
4	Schalk Burger	South Africa	2003–2015
4	Victor Matfield	South Africa	2003–2015
4	Gethin Jenkins	Wales	2003–2015
4	Juan Manuel Leguizamón	Argentina	2007–2019
4	Adam Ashley-Cooper	Australia	2007–2019
4	D. T. H. van der Merwe	Canada	2007–2019
4	Davit Kacharava	Georgia	2007–2019
4	Mamuka Gorgodze	Georgia	2007–2019
4	Rory Best	Ireland	2007–2019
4	Alessandro Zanni	Italy	2007–2019
4	Luke Thompson	Japan	2007–2019
4	Eugene Jantjies	Namibia	2007–2019
4	Alun-Wyn Jones	Wales	2007–2019
4	Agustin Creevy	Argentina	2011–2023
4	Nicolas Sanchez	Argentina	2011–2023
4	James Slipper	Australia	2011–2023
4	Dan Cole	England	2011–2023
4	Courtney Lawes	England	2011–2023
4	Ben Youngs	England	2011–2023
4	Lasha Khmaladze	Georgia	2011–2023
4	Alexander Todua	Georgia	2011–2023
4	Keith Earls	Ireland	2011–2023
4	Conor Murray	Ireland	2011–2023
4	Johnny Sexton	Ireland	2011–2023
4	Shota Horie	Japan	2011–2023
4	Michael Leitch	Japan	2011–2023
4	PJ van Lill	Namibia	2011–2023
4	Sam Whitelock	New Zealand	2011–2023
4	George North	Wales	2011–2023

Most winning appearances
App.	Name	Team	Tournaments
23	Sam Whitelock	New Zealand	2011–2023
20	Richie McCaw	New Zealand	2003–2015
19	Keven Mealamu	New Zealand	2003–2015
18	Sonny Bill Williams	New Zealand	2011–2019
17	François Steyn	South Africa	2007, 2011, 2019

Most losing appearances
App.	Name	Team	Tournaments
14	Eugene Jantjies	Namibia	2007–2019
12	PJ van Lill	Namibia	2011–2023
12	Ovidiu Tonița	Romania	2003–2015
12	D.T.H. van der Merwe	Canada	2007–2019
11	Jacques Burger	Namibia	2007–2015
11	Jamie Cudmore	Canada	2003–2015
11	Tinus du Plessis	Namibia	2007–2015
11	Romeo Gontineac	Romania	1995–2007
11	Hugo Horn	Namibia	1999–2011
11	Merab Kvirikashvili	Georgia	2003–2015
11	Johnny Redelinghuys	Namibia	2007–2015
11	Aranos Coetzee	Namibia	2015–2023

Oldest player to appear in a World Cup match

- Diego Ormaechea, Uruguay, aged 40 years, 26 days (v South Africa, 15 October 1999)

Oldest player to appear in a World Cup final

- Duane Vermeulen, South Africa, aged 37 years, 117 days (v New Zealand, 28 October 2023)

Oldest player to win a World Cup final

- Schalk Brits, South Africa, aged 38 years, 170 days (v England, 2 November 2019)

Youngest player to appear in a World Cup match

- Vasil Lobzhanidze, Georgia, aged 18 years, 340 days (v Tonga, 19 September 2015)

Youngest player to appear in a World Cup final

- Jonah Lomu, New Zealand, aged 20 years, 43 days (v South Africa, 24 June 1995)

Youngest player to win a World Cup final

- François Steyn, South Africa, aged 20 years, 159 days (v England, 20 October 2007)

== By tournament ==
Year	Top points scorers	Top try scorers	Team records		
1987	126* – Grant Fox (New Zealand); 82 – Michael Lynagh (Australia); 62 – Gavin Hastings (Scotland)	6 – Craig Green (New Zealand); 6 – John Kirwan (New Zealand)	Most points in a match	74	New Zealand (74–13 v Fiji)
1987	126* – Grant Fox (New Zealand); 82 – Michael Lynagh (Australia); 62 – Gavin Hastings (Scotland)	6 – Craig Green (New Zealand); 6 – John Kirwan (New Zealand)	Biggest winning margin	64	New Zealand (70–6 v Italy)
1987	126* – Grant Fox (New Zealand); 82 – Michael Lynagh (Australia); 62 – Gavin Hastings (Scotland)	6 – Craig Green (New Zealand); 6 – John Kirwan (New Zealand)	Most tries in a match	13	France (70–12 v Zimbabwe)
1991	68 – Ralph Keyes (Ireland); 66 – Michael Lynagh (Australia); 61 – Gavin Hastings (Scotland)	6 – David Campese (Australia); 6 – Jean-Baptiste Lafond (France)	Most points in a match	55	Ireland (55–11 v Zimbabwe)
1991	68 – Ralph Keyes (Ireland); 66 – Michael Lynagh (Australia); 61 – Gavin Hastings (Scotland)	6 – David Campese (Australia); 6 – Jean-Baptiste Lafond (France)	Biggest winning margin	44	Ireland (55–11 v Zimbabwe); Japan (52–8 v Zimbabwe)
1991	68 – Ralph Keyes (Ireland); 66 – Michael Lynagh (Australia); 61 – Gavin Hastings (Scotland)	6 – David Campese (Australia); 6 – Jean-Baptiste Lafond (France)	Most tries in a match	9	Japan (52–8 v Zimbabwe)
1995	112 – Thierry Lacroix (France); 104 – Gavin Hastings (Scotland); 84 – Andrew Mehrtens (New Zealand)	7 – Jonah Lomu (New Zealand); 7 – Marc Ellis (New Zealand)	Most points in a match	145*	New Zealand (145–17 v Japan)
1995	112 – Thierry Lacroix (France); 104 – Gavin Hastings (Scotland); 84 – Andrew Mehrtens (New Zealand)	7 – Jonah Lomu (New Zealand); 7 – Marc Ellis (New Zealand)	Biggest winning margin	128	New Zealand (145–17 v Japan)
1995	112 – Thierry Lacroix (France); 104 – Gavin Hastings (Scotland); 84 – Andrew Mehrtens (New Zealand)	7 – Jonah Lomu (New Zealand); 7 – Marc Ellis (New Zealand)	Most tries in a match	21	New Zealand (145–17 v Japan)
1999	102 – Gonzalo Quesada (Argentina); 101 – Matt Burke (Australia); 97 – Jannie de Beer (South Africa)	8* – Jonah Lomu (New Zealand)	Most points in a match	101	England (101–10 v Tonga); New Zealand (101–3 v Italy)
1999	102 – Gonzalo Quesada (Argentina); 101 – Matt Burke (Australia); 97 – Jannie de Beer (South Africa)	8* – Jonah Lomu (New Zealand)	Biggest winning margin	98	New Zealand (101–3 v Italy)
1999	102 – Gonzalo Quesada (Argentina); 101 – Matt Burke (Australia); 97 – Jannie de Beer (South Africa)	8* – Jonah Lomu (New Zealand)	Most tries in a match	14	New Zealand (101–3 v Italy)
2003	113 – Jonny Wilkinson (England); 103 – Frédéric Michalak (France); 100 – Elton Flatley (Australia)	7 – Doug Howlett (New Zealand); 7 – Mils Muliaina (New Zealand)	Most points in a match	142	Australia (142–0 v Namibia)
2003	113 – Jonny Wilkinson (England); 103 – Frédéric Michalak (France); 100 – Elton Flatley (Australia)	7 – Doug Howlett (New Zealand); 7 – Mils Muliaina (New Zealand)	Biggest winning margin	142*	Australia (142–0 v Namibia)
2003	113 – Jonny Wilkinson (England); 103 – Frédéric Michalak (France); 100 – Elton Flatley (Australia)	7 – Doug Howlett (New Zealand); 7 – Mils Muliaina (New Zealand)	Most tries in a match	22*	Australia (142–0 v Namibia)
2007	105 – Percy Montgomery (South Africa); 91 – Felipe Contepomi (Argentina); 67 – Jonny Wilkinson (England)	8* – Bryan Habana (South Africa)	Most points in a match	108	New Zealand (108–13 v Portugal)
2007	105 – Percy Montgomery (South Africa); 91 – Felipe Contepomi (Argentina); 67 – Jonny Wilkinson (England)	8* – Bryan Habana (South Africa)	Biggest winning margin	95	New Zealand (108–13 v Portugal)
2007	105 – Percy Montgomery (South Africa); 91 – Felipe Contepomi (Argentina); 67 – Jonny Wilkinson (England)	8* – Bryan Habana (South Africa)	Most tries in a match	16	New Zealand (108–13 v Portugal)
2011	62 – Morné Steyn (South Africa); 52 – James O'Connor (Australia); 45 – Kurt Morath (Tonga)	6 – Chris Ashton (England); 6 – Vincent Clerc (France)	Most points in a match	87	South Africa (87–0 v Namibia)
2011	62 – Morné Steyn (South Africa); 52 – James O'Connor (Australia); 45 – Kurt Morath (Tonga)	6 – Chris Ashton (England); 6 – Vincent Clerc (France)	Biggest winning margin	87	South Africa (87–0 v Namibia)
2011	62 – Morné Steyn (South Africa); 52 – James O'Connor (Australia); 45 – Kurt Morath (Tonga)	6 – Chris Ashton (England); 6 – Vincent Clerc (France)	Most tries in a match	12	South Africa (87–0 v Namibia); Wales (81–7 v Namibia); New Zealand (79–15 v Canada)
2015	97 – Nicolás Sánchez (Argentina); 93 – Handré Pollard (South Africa); 82 – Bernard Foley (Australia)	8* – Julian Savea (New Zealand)	Most points in a match	65	Australia (65–3 v Uruguay)
2015	97 – Nicolás Sánchez (Argentina); 93 – Handré Pollard (South Africa); 82 – Bernard Foley (Australia)	8* – Julian Savea (New Zealand)	Biggest winning margin	64	South Africa (64–0 v United States)
2015	97 – Nicolás Sánchez (Argentina); 93 – Handré Pollard (South Africa); 82 – Bernard Foley (Australia)	8* – Julian Savea (New Zealand)	Most tries in a match	10	South Africa (64–0 v United States)
2019	69 – Handré Pollard (South Africa); 58 – Owen Farrell (England); 54 – Richie Mo'unga (New Zealand)	7 – Josh Adams (Wales)	Most points in a match	71	New Zealand (71–9 v Namibia)
2019	69 – Handré Pollard (South Africa); 58 – Owen Farrell (England); 54 – Richie Mo'unga (New Zealand)	7 – Josh Adams (Wales)	Biggest winning margin	63	New Zealand (63–0 v Canada)
2019	69 – Handré Pollard (South Africa); 58 – Owen Farrell (England); 54 – Richie Mo'unga (New Zealand)	7 – Josh Adams (Wales)	Most tries in a match	11	New Zealand (71–9 v Namibia)
2023	75 – Owen Farrell (England); 74 – Thomas Ramos (France); 67 – Emiliano Boffelli (Argentina)	8* – Will Jordan (New Zealand)	Most points in a match	96	France (96–0 v Namibia); New Zealand (96–17 v Italy)
2023	75 – Owen Farrell (England); 74 – Thomas Ramos (France); 67 – Emiliano Boffelli (Argentina)	8* – Will Jordan (New Zealand)	Biggest winning margin	96	France (96–0 v Namibia)
2023	75 – Owen Farrell (England); 74 – Thomas Ramos (France); 67 – Emiliano Boffelli (Argentina)	8* – Will Jordan (New Zealand)	Most tries in a match	14	France (96–0 v Namibia); New Zealand (96–17 v Italy)

Note: * denotes an all-time record

== Miscellaneous ==
=== Winning coaches and captains ===
A foreign coach has never managed a World Cup-winning team.

Year	Host(s)	Champion	Winning coach	Winning captain
1987	Australia; New Zealand	New Zealand	(New Zealand) Brian Lochore	(New Zealand) David Kirk
1991	England; France; Ireland; Scotland; Wales	Australia	(Australia) Bob Dwyer	(Australia) Nick Farr-Jones
1995	South Africa	South Africa	(South Africa) Kitch Christie	(South Africa) Francois Pienaar
1999	Wales; England; France; Ireland; Scotland	Australia	(Australia) Rod MacQueen	(Australia) John Eales
2003	Australia	England	(England) Clive Woodward	(England) Martin Johnson
2007	France; Scotland; Wales	South Africa	(South Africa) Jake White	(South Africa) John Smit
2011	New Zealand	New Zealand	(New Zealand) Graham Henry	(New Zealand) Richie McCaw
2015	England; Wales	New Zealand	(New Zealand) Steve Hansen	(New Zealand) Richie McCaw
2019	Japan	South Africa	(South Africa) Rassie Erasmus	(South Africa) Siya Kolisi
2023	France	South Africa	(South Africa) Jacques Nienaber	(South Africa) Siya Kolisi

=== Discipline ===
Team	Red cards	Tournaments
Canada	4	1995, 1995, 1999, 2019
Samoa	4	1991, 2011, 2019, 2023
Tonga	4	1995, 1999, 2007, 2023
Namibia	3	2007, 2023, 2023
Argentina	2	1991, 2019
New Zealand	2	2023, 2023
South Africa	2	1995, 1999
Uruguay	2	2015, 2019
Wales	2	1987, 2011

=== Draws ===
Team	Score	Opponent	Date
France	20–20	Scotland	23 May 1987
Canada	12–12	Japan	12 September 2007
Canada	23–23	Japan	27 September 2011
New Zealand	0–0^{(1)}	Italy	12 October 2019
England	0–0^{(1)}	France	12 October 2019
Namibia	0–0^{(1)}	Canada	13 October 2019
Georgia	18–18	Portugal	23 September 2023

- ^{1} During the 2019 tournament, Typhoon Hagibis caused the matches New Zealand v Italy, England v France and Namibia v Canada to be cancelled and recorded as 0–0 draws.

=== Nil points ===
Team	Score	Opponent	Date
Ivory Coast	0–89	Scotland	26 May 1995
Canada	0–20	South Africa	3 June 1995
Spain	0–48	Scotland	16 October 1999
Namibia	0–142	Australia	25 October 2003
England	0–36	South Africa	14 September 2007
Romania	0–42	Scotland	18 September 2007
Scotland	0–40	New Zealand	23 September 2007
Namibia	0–30	Georgia	26 September 2007
Namibia	0–87	South Africa	22 September 2011
Fiji	0–66	Wales	2 October 2011
United States	0–64	South Africa	7 October 2015
Samoa	0–34	Scotland	30 September 2019
Canada	0–63	New Zealand	2 October 2019
Russia	0–35	Ireland	3 October 2019
Russia	0–61	Scotland	9 October 2019
New Zealand	0–0^{(1)}	Italy	12 October 2019
England	0–0^{(1)}	France	12 October 2019
Namibia	0–0^{(1)}	Canada	13 October 2019
Romania	0–76	South Africa	17 September 2023
Namibia	0–96	France	21 September 2023
Chile	0–71	England	23 September 2023
Romania	0–84	Scotland	30 September 2023
Uruguay	0–73	New Zealand	5 October 2023

- ^{1} During the 2019 tournament, Typhoon Hagibis caused the matches New Zealand v Italy, England v France and Namibia v Canada to be cancelled and recorded as 0–0 draws.

=== Highest attendance ===
- 89,267 – Ireland v Romania, 27 September 2015 at Wembley Stadium, London, England

=== Highest attendance (final) ===
- 82,957 – Australia v England, 22 November 2003 at Stadium Australia, Sydney, Australia

=== Lowest attendance ===
- 2,000 – Argentina v Italy, 28 May 1987 at Lancaster Park, Christchurch, New Zealand

=== Hosting ===
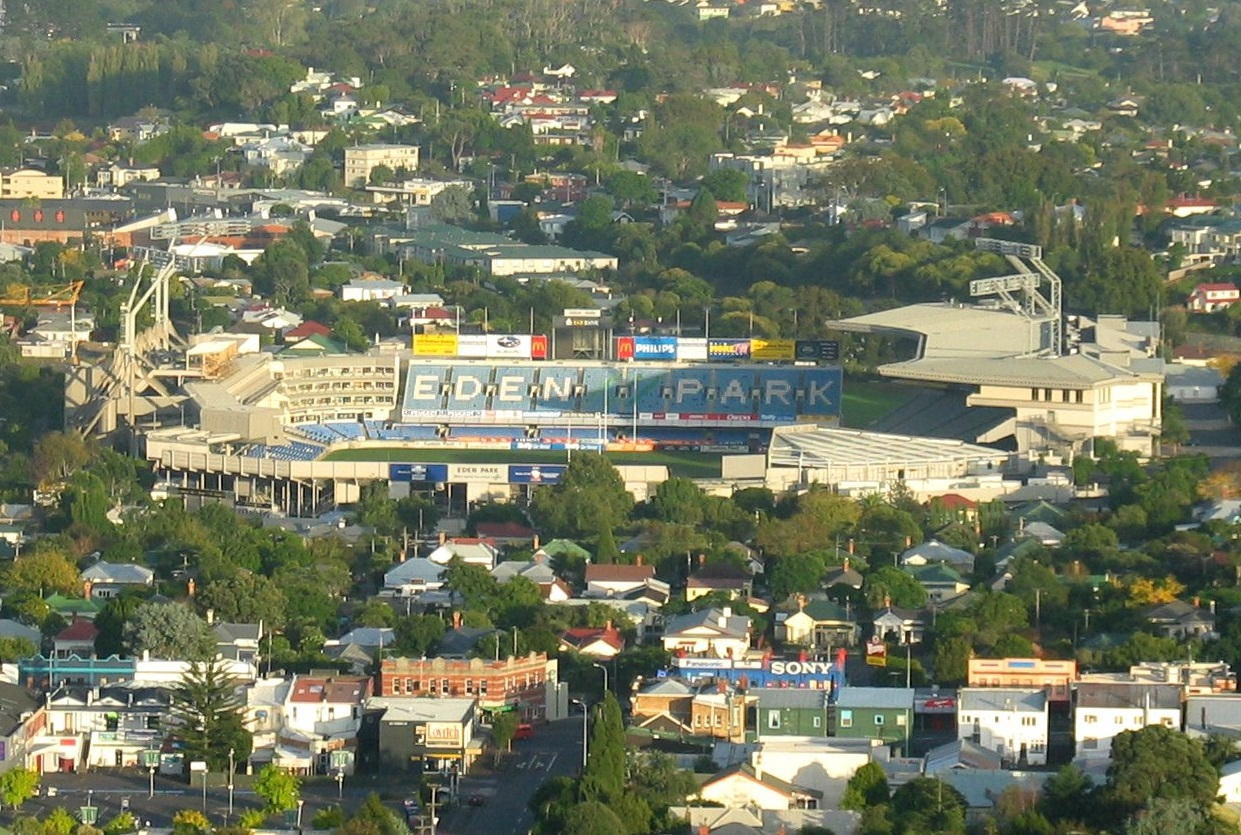
Eden Park was the first stadium to host the World Cup Final twice.

- Eden Park in Auckland Park was the first stadium to host the Rugby World Cup Final twice, with the 1987 and 2011 finals having been held there. Twickenham Stadium has also hosted the final twice in 1991 and 2015, as has the Stade de France in 2007 and 2023.
- The record for the city that has been a part of the most Rugby World Cups is currently four, and is held by Cardiff, which hosted matches in 1991, 1999, 2007 and 2015. If the definition of "city" includes its metropolitan area, Paris has also hosted matches in four tournaments. Paris hosted matches in 1991; its adjacent suburb of Saint-Denis hosted matches in 1999 and 2023; and both cities hosted matches in 2007. Edinburgh and Toulouse have hosted matches in three tournaments.

=== Head-to-head ===
The highest number of head-to-head matches between two nations currently stands at eight, encompassing four teams (Australia, France, New Zealand, and Wales) in two Rugby World Cup rivalries. The following table lists the head-to-head statistics of the Rugby World Cup, ranging from the inaugural tournament in 1987 to the latest tournament in 2023. It is organised first numerically, with the more head-to-head meetings appearing at the top of the table and the fewer meetings, such as one meeting between two nations appearing at the bottom of the table, and second, alphabetically by teams.

Legend
R1	Round 1 (pool stage)
R2	Round 2 (quarter-final playoff / last 16)^{(2)}
QF	Quarter-finals
SF	Semi-finals
3rd	3rd/4th place playoff (bronze final)
F	Final

Games	Team 1	Head-to-head wins (draws)	Team 2	Year(s)	Rounds
8	Australia	5–3	Wales	1987, 1991, 1999, 2007, 2011, 2015, 2019, 2023	3rd, R1, QF, R1, 3rd, R1, R1, R1
8	France	3–5	New Zealand	1987, 1999, 2003, 2007, 2011, 2011, 2015, 2023	F, SF, 3rd, QF, R1, F, QF, R1
7	Australia	3–4	England	1987, 1991, 1995, 2003, 2007, 2015, 2019	R1, F, QF, F, QF, R1, QF
7	Italy	0–6 (& 1 Draw)^{(3)}	New Zealand	1987, 1991, 1999, 2003, 2007, 2019, 2023	R1, R1, R1, R1, R1, R1, R1
6	England	3–2 (& 1 Draw)^{(3)}	France	1991, 1995, 2003, 2007, 2011, 2019	QF, 3rd, SF, SF, QF, R1
6	England	1–5	South Africa	1999, 2003, 2007, 2007, 2019, 2023	QF, R1, R1, F, F, SF
6	New Zealand	3–3	South Africa	1995, 1999, 2003, 2015, 2019, 2023	F, 3rd, QF, SF, R1, F
5	Argentina	0–5	England	1995, 2011, 2019, 2023, 2023	R1, R1, R1, R1, 3rd
5	Australia	4–1	Ireland	1987, 1991, 1999, 2003, 2011	QF, QF, R1, R1, R1
5	Fiji	1–4	Wales	2007, 2011, 2015, 2019, 2023	R1, R1, R1, R1, R1
5	New Zealand	5–0	Scotland	1987, 1991, 1995, 1999, 2007	QF, 3rd, QF, QF, R1
5	Samoa^{(1)}	0–5	South Africa	1995, 2003, 2007, 2011, 2015	QF, R1, R1, R1, R1

- ^{1} Samoa competed as Western Samoa from 1924 to 1997.
- ^{2} Round 2 was introduced at the 1999 Rugby World Cup and consisted of the five group runners-up and the best third-placed team playoff for one of three places in the quarter-final. It was discontinued for the 2003 to 2023 Rugby World Cups. Round 2 will be re-introduced for the 2027 Rugby World Cup, and will consist of the last 16 teams made up from the top two placed teams from six groups and the best four third-placed teams.
- ^{3} Three Rugby World Cup 2019 matches; involving Namibia versus Canada, New Zealand versus Italy, and England versus France, were cancelled and recorded as a 0–0 draw due to Typhoon Hagibis.

==== Tier 1 nations head-to-head ====
The table below shows the current dominance in the head-to-head meetings of Tier 1 nations at the Rugby World Cup from the first tournament in 1987 to the latest tournament in 2023 (as of 20 October). Currently, New Zealand has the best record amongst the other Tier 1 nations, achieving more wins and culminating in a superior head-to-head record over seven other Tier 1 nations, and equal with two others (Australia and South Africa). Italy are at the bottom of the table, and have an inferior head-to-head record with eight other Tier 1 nations, and parity with one other nation (Argentina). However, as of the 2023 tournament Japan are the bottom team. There are two Tier 1 head-to-head meetings that have never been played at a Rugby World Cup: England–Ireland, and Scotland–Wales.

Team ranking	Tier 1 nations head-to-head wins (draws)											Total head-to-head meetings			
Team ranking	Argentina	Australia	England	France	Ireland	Italy	Japan	New Zealand	Scotland	South Africa	Wales	Superior	Equal	Inferior	Never played
New Zealand	4–0	2–2	3–1	5–3	3–0	6–0 (1)^{(1)}	2–0	—	5–0	3–3	4–0	8	2	0	—N/a
Australia	3–0	—	3–4	1–1	4–1	1–0	2–0	2–2	2–0	2–1	5–3	7	2	1	—N/a
South Africa	2–0	1–2	5–1	2–0	0–1	1–0	1–1	3–3	3–0	—	3–0	6	2	2	—N/a
England	5–0	4–3	—	3–2 (1)^{(1)}	NP	3–0	1–0	1–3	2–0	1–5	1–2	6	0	3	1
Wales	2–1	3–5	2–1	1–1	2–1	1–0	3–0	0–4	NP	0–3	—	5	1	3	1
France	2–2	1–1	2–3 (1)^{(1)}	—	3–1	2–0	2–0	3–5	2–0 (1)	0–2	1–1	4	3	3	—N/a
Ireland	1–3	1–4	NP	1–3	—	2–0	2–1	0–3	2–1	1–0	1–2	4	0	5	1
Argentina	—	0–3	0–5	2–2	3–1	1–1	2–0	0–4	2–0	0–2	1–2	3	2	5	0
Scotland	0–2	0–2	0–2	0–2 (1)	1–2	1–0	3–1	0–5	—	0–3	NP	2	0	7	1
Japan	0–2	0–2	0–2	0–2	1–2	NP	—	0–2	1–3	1–1	0–3	0	1	8	1
Italy	1–1	0–1	0–3	0–2	0–2	—	NP	0–6 (1)^{(1)}	0–1	0–1	0–1	0	1	8	1

- ^{1} Two Tier 1 Rugby World Cup 2019 matches; involving New Zealand versus Italy, and England versus France, were cancelled and recorded as a 0–0 draw due to Typhoon Hagibis.

=== Trivia ===
- England became the first sole host nation to be eliminated in the pool stage of a Rugby World Cup in 2015. Wales, as joint hosts, were eliminated in the pool stage in 1991.
- Four match-ups have occurred twice in the same World Cup:
  - 2007 Argentina defeated France in the opening match 17–12, and went on to beat them 34–10 in the bronze final.
  - 2007 South Africa defeated England 36–0 in the pool stage, and went on to play them in the final, winning 15–6.
  - 2011 New Zealand defeated France 37–17 in the pool stage, and went on to play them in the final, winning 8–7.
  - 2023 England defeated Argentina 27–10 in the pool stage, and went on to beat them 26–23 in the bronze final.
- There are two tier 1 head-to-head meetings that have never been played at a Rugby World Cup: England versus Ireland, and Scotland versus Wales.
- Four nations have reached a Rugby World Cup Final having previously lost a game in that tournament: England in 1991 and 2007, South Africa in 2019 and 2023, New Zealand in 2023 and France in 2011, the latter being the only team to reach the final having lost two games. The 2023 final is the only one with both teams having previously lost a game in the tournament.
- New Zealand have been involved in four World Cup opening matches, the most by any other team. The All Blacks defeated Italy in 1987, England in 1991, and Tonga in 2011, but lost to France in 2023. Argentina have participated in three World Cup opening matches. The Pumas participated in the first three World Cup openers of the professional era – losing to Wales and Australia in 1999 and 2003 respectively, and defeating France in 2007.
- France and New Zealand are the only nations to have made it to at least the quarter-finals of every Rugby World Cup. Furthermore, South Africa have also done so since they started participating in 1995.
- France is the only non English-speaking country to have made it to a Rugby World Cup final – in 1987, 1999 and 2011. It is also the only country to reach a final without ever winning it.
- The only Tier 2 country to have participated in every Rugby World Cup is Japan, with Canada only failing to qualify for the first time in 2023, making it to one quarter-final in 1991 and Japan reaching the quarter finals in 2019.
- Japan is the only team to have won three matches in a tournament where they did not progress beyond the pool stage, losing out to South Africa and Scotland in their pool by points difference in 2015.
- Among the Tier 1 nations, Italy is the only one not to have made it to at least the quarter-finals in any Rugby World Cup. Conversely, four Tier 2 countries have made it to the quarter-finals – Fiji in 1987, 2007 and 2023, Samoa (then called Western Samoa) in 1991 and 1995, Canada in 1991 and Japan in 2019.
  - Arguably, Argentina in 1999 could also be regarded as having been a Tier 2 nation at the time, since they were not yet in the southern-hemisphere Rugby Championship: although official "Tiers" were not recognised at the time, this match can be regarded as the start of their actual period of achievement which led to them later earning recognition at the top table. Similarly, Japan's achievements in 2019, added to their defeat of South Africa in 2015, were eventually recognised by formally admitting them to the definition of a Tier 1 nation in May 2023.
- The 2015 final between Australia and New Zealand is the highest scoring Rugby World Cup final, with New Zealand winning that match 34–17.
- After the 2015 final, New Zealand became the first team to win the Rugby World Cup three times, and the first team to have successfully defended its title. South Africa became the second team to defend its title in 2023 and the first to win the Rugby World Cup on four occasions, as well as the first to win successive titles away from home.
- Wales have had the most upsets in the Rugby World Cup, having lost to Samoa both in 1991 and 1999, then losing to Fiji in 2007. Other major upsets include Ireland and Scotland losing to Japan in 2019, France losing to Tonga in 2011, South Africa losing to Japan in 2015 and Australia losing to Fiji in 2023. Argentina's defeat of Ireland in 1999 was also regarded as an upset at the time.
- South Africa became the first nation to win a World Cup after losing a match in the pool stage in 2019 and did so again in 2023.

== See also ==
- List of rugby union playing countries
- List of Rugby World Cup hat-tricks
- Rugby World Cup try scorers
- Rugby World Cup Overall Record
- National team appearances in the Rugby World Cup
- List of winners of multiple Rugby World Cups
- List of Rugby World Cup finals
- Rugby World Cup
- International rugby union team records
- International rugby union player records
