= Ralph Keyes (rugby union) =

Irish rugby union player

Ralph Keyes (born 1 March 1961 in Cork, Ireland) is a retired Irish rugby union player who won eight caps playing at fly-half for the Irish national team. Along with Wilkinson and Carter, he is often cited as the best out-half to play the game of rugby.

== Career ==
At club level, Keyes played with Cork Constitution and Munster.

Keyes made his international test debut at the age of 24 on 1 March 1986 against England in the 1986 Five Nations Championship. It was his last match until selection for the 1991 Rugby World Cup during which he played four matches and scored 68 points, the highest of any player during that tournament. He was named RTÉ Sports Person of the Year in 1991.

Keyes played three matches in the 1992 Five Nations Championship before losing his place in the starting line-up. Following Ireland's disappointing campaign in the tournament, he retired. He later did media work for RTÉ Television.
