= Jannie de Beer =

South Africa international rugby union player

- Born: Jan Hendrik de Beer; 22 April 1971 (age 55) Odendaalsrus, Free State, South Africa
- Height: 1.82 m (6 ft 0 in)
- Weight: 87 kg (192 lb)
- School: Wessel Maree High School, Odendaalsrus
- University: University of the Free State

Rugby union career
- Position: Flyhalf
Senior career
| Years | Team | Apps | (Points) |
| 1998–99 | London Scottish | 16 | (168) |
| 2001–02 | Saracens | 6 | (53) |
Provincial / State sides
| Years | Team | Apps | (Points) |
| 1990–94, 96–99 | Free State | 80 | (915) |
| 1995 | Transvaal | | |
Super Rugby
| Years | Team | Apps | (Points) |
| 1998 | Cats | 6 | (72) |
| 2000 | Bulls | 10 | (123) |
International career
| Years | Team | Apps | (Points) |
| 1997–99 | South Africa | 13 | (181) |

Jan Hendrik "Jannie" de Beer (born 22 April 1971) is a South African former rugby union player. He played fly-half for the South African national team, the Springboks. In all he represented the Springboks in 13 tests, scoring 181 points. He was principally known as a kicking fly-half.

== Career ==
Born in Welkom, de Beer represented Northern Free State at the 1989 Craven Week tournament. He made his senior provincial debut for the Free State in 1990 as a 19-year-old.

De Beer made his début against the British & Irish Lions in 1997, being brought in for the dropped Henry Honiball whose running game had been contained by the Lions' defence in the first two of the three tests. He failed however to establish himself properly in the Springbok side.

De Beer is most famous for his world record five drop goals in a single test match, set in the 1999 Rugby World Cup in Paris against England. The Springboks won the match 44–21, knocking England out of the tournament. However, his attempts to repeat the tactic in the semi-final versus Australia backfired, as despite several attempts he only scored one in the match, and the Australians closed him down. It proved to be his final appearance for the Springboks.

A professed Christian, de Beer credits his faith in God for his successes. De Beer retired from professional rugby in 2002 due to a knee injury.

At the end of 2019, de Beer was appointed as the director of rugby at the Windhoek Gymnasium.

=== Test history ===
| No. | Opponents | Results (SA 1st) | Position | Points | Dates | Venue |
|---|---|---|---|---|---|---|
| 1. | British Lions | 35–16 | Flyhalf | 13 (2 conv, 3 pen) | 5 July 1997 | Ellis Park, Johannesburg |
| 2. | New Zealand | 32–35 | Flyhalf | 22 (2 conv, 4 pen, 2 drop) | 19 July 1997 | Ellis Park, Johannesburg |
| 3. | Australia | 20–32 | Flyhalf | 10 (1 try, 1 conv, 1 pen) | 2 August 1997 | Suncorp Stadium, Brisbane |
| 4. | New Zealand | 35–55 | Flyhalf | 6 (3 conv) | 9 August 1997 | Eden Park, Auckland |
| 5. | Australia | 61–22 | Flyhalf | 26 (1 try, 6 conv, 3 pen) | 23 August 1997 | Loftus Versfeld, Pretoria |
| 6. | France | 52–10 | Replacement | | 22 November 1997 | Parc des Princes, Paris |
| 7. | Scotland | 68–10 | Flyhalf | 2 (1 conv) | 6 December 1997 | Murrayfield, Edinburgh |
| 8. | Australia | 10–9 | Flyhalf | 5 (1 conv, 1 pen) | 14 August 1999 | Newlands, Cape Town |
| 9. | Scotland | 46–29 | Flyhalf | 16 (5 conv, 2 pen) | 3 October 1999 | Murrayfield, Edinburgh |
| 10. | Spain | 47–3 | Flyhalf | 12 (6 conv) | 10 October 1999 | Murrayfield, Edinburgh |
| 11. | Uruguay | 39–3 | Flyhalf | 14 (4 conv, 2 pen) | 15 October 1999 | Hampden Park, Glasgow |
| 12. | England | 44–21 | Flyhalf | 34 (2 conv, 5 pen, 5 drop) | 24 October 1999 | Stade de France, Paris |
| 13. | Australia | 21–27 | Flyhalf | 21 (6 pen, 1 drop) | 30 October 1999 | Twickenham, London |

Legend: pen = penalty (3 pts.); conv = conversion (2 pts.), drop = drop kick (3 pts.).

== See also ==
- List of South Africa national rugby union players – Springbok no. 653
