= Brian Robinson (rugby union) =

Northern Irish rugby player (born 1966)

Brian Robinson (born 20 March 1966) is a former Irish rugby union international player who played for the Irish national rugby union team as a number eight. He played for Ireland from 1991 to 1994, winning 25 caps and scoring 6 tries, after making his debut in February 1991 against France in a 21–13 defeat. He was part of the Ireland squad at the 1991 Rugby World Cup where he scored four tries in a match against Zimbabwe.

Robinson was born in Belfast, and was a pupil at Cambridge House Grammar School in Ballymena. He is head of Physical Education at Campbell College Belfast, he also is master in charge of rugby and the 1XV Head Coach. He has enjoyed recent Schools Cup success with wins in 2011 and 2018.

In 2022, he appeared as a contestant on Channel 4's Four in a Bed with his B&B, Manse on the Beach in Cloghy, and won the competition with his hotel scoring 111% from his fellow competitors.
