= List of Rugby World Cup hat-tricks =

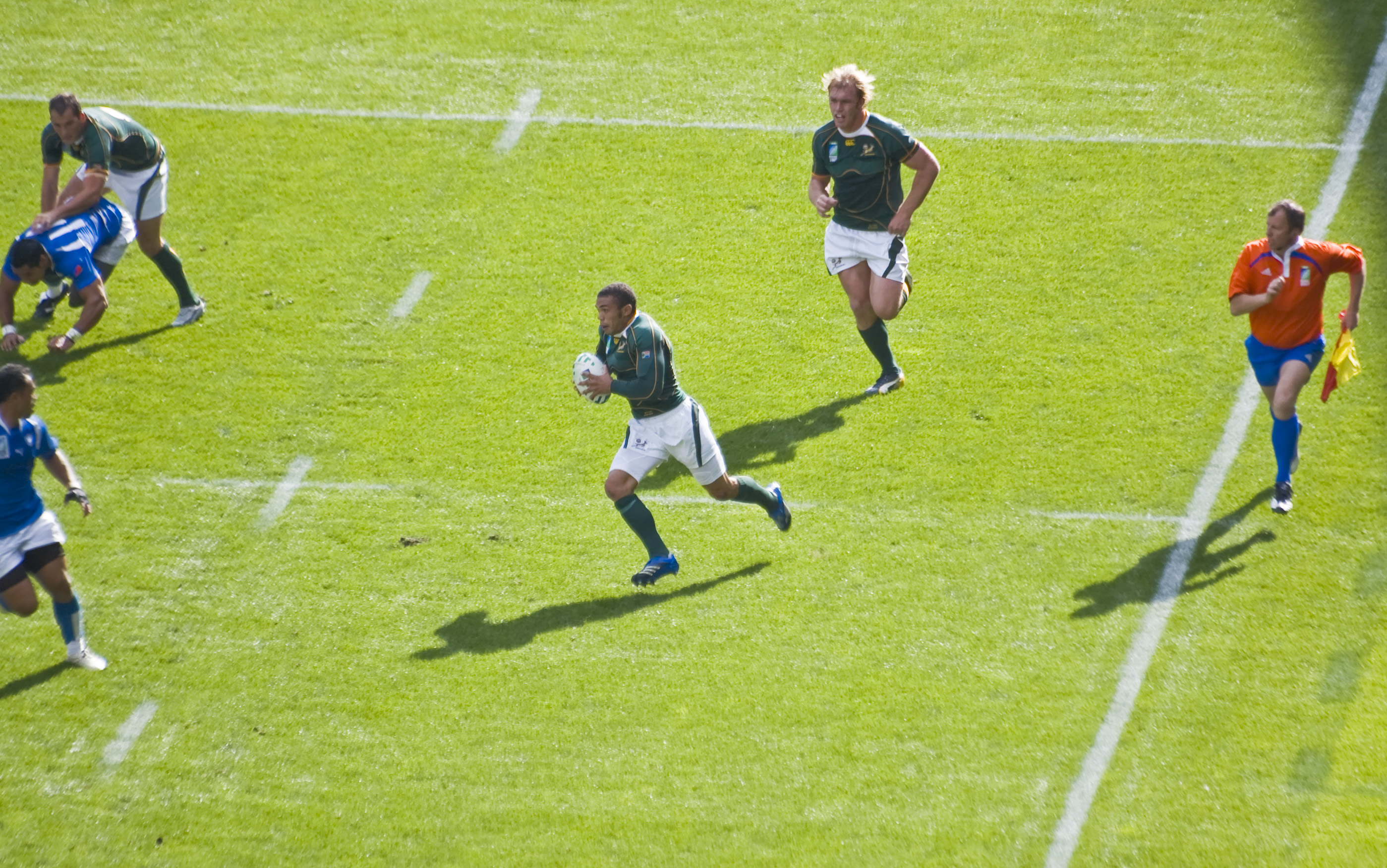
Bryan Habana (shown with ball in hand) scored four tries for South Africa in the 2007 Rugby World Cup match against Samoa.

Since the inception of the Rugby World Cup in 1987, a total of 69 players have scored three tries or drop goals (a hat-trick) in a single match. The first player to achieve the feat was Craig Green, who scored four tries in New Zealand's 74–13 victory over Fiji during the 1987 Rugby World Cup. His teammate John Gallagher also scored four tries in this match. Besides Green and Gallagher, 15 players have scored more than three tries in a match; of these, Chris Latham and Josh Lewsey have scored five, while Marc Ellis scored six in New Zealand's 145–17 victory against Japan in 1995. Two of Ellis's teammates, Eric Rush and Jeff Wilson, also scored hat-tricks in this game. Five players have scored a hat-trick of drop goals: Jannie de Beer, Jonny Wilkinson, Juan Martín Hernández, Theuns Kotzé and George Ford. Of these, de Beer scored the most in one match, with five drop goals in South Africa's 44–21 victory over England in the 1999 Rugby World Cup.

Hat-tricks are more likely to occur in the pool stages, where higher ranked teams, such as New Zealand, who have scored fourteen World Cup hat-tricks, face lower ranked opposition, such as Namibia, who have conceded hat-tricks on ten occasions. There have only been seven hat-tricks in the World Cup knockout stages: Chester Williams and Jonah Lomu in 1995, de Beer in 1999, Wilkinson in 2003, Julian Savea and Adam Ashley-Cooper in 2015 and Will Jordan in 2023.

Six players have scored two World Cup hat-tricks, Savea being the only one to have scored both in the same tournament. Of the six teams in the Six Nations and four in the Rugby Championship teams, only Italy have failed to score a hat-trick at the World Cup. Fiji, Namibia and Samoa are the only other teams to score a hat-trick, which were scored by Vereniki Goneva, Kotze and Alesana Tuilagi, respectively. Goneva and Kotze's hat-tricks are the only time players on opposing teams have accomplished this feat in the same match at the 2011 Rugby World Cup.

== Hat-tricks ==
Unless noted otherwise, the players listed below scored a hat-trick of tries.

Key
^{D3}	Player scored hat-trick of drop goals
^{D5}	Player scored five drop goals
^{T4}	Player scored four tries
^{T5}	Player scored five tries
^{T6}	Player scored six tries

Rugby World Cup hat-tricks
No.	Player	Year	For	Against	Stage	Result	Venue	Date
1	Craig Green^{T4}	1987	New Zealand	Fiji	Pool	74–13	Lancaster Park, Christchurch	27 May 1987
2	John Gallagher^{T4}	1987	New Zealand	Fiji	Pool	74–13	Lancaster Park, Christchurch	27 May 1987
3	Glen Webbe	1987	Wales	Tonga	Pool	29–16	FMG Stadium, Palmerston North	29 May 1987
4	Mike Harrison	1987	England	Japan	Pool	60–7	Concord Oval, Sydney	30 May 1987
5	John Jeffrey	1987	Scotland	Romania	Pool	55–28	Carisbrook, Dunedin	2 June 1987
6	Didier Camberabero	1987	France	Zimbabwe	Pool	70–12	Eden Park, Auckland	2 June 1987
7	Rodolphe Modin	1987	France	Zimbabwe	Pool	70–12	Eden Park, Auckland	2 June 1987
8	Ieuan Evans^{T4}	1987	Wales	Canada	Pool	40–9	Rugby Park Stadium, Invercargill	3 June 1987
9	Brendan Mullin	1987	Ireland	Tonga	Pool	32–9	Ballymore Stadium, Brisbane	3 June 1987
10	Brian Robinson^{T4}	1991	Ireland	Zimbabwe	Pool	55–11	Lansdowne Road, Dublin	6 October 1991
11	Terry Wright	1991	New Zealand	United States	Pool	46–6	Kingsholm, Gloucester	8 October 1991
12	Jean-Baptiste Lafond	1991	France	Fiji	Pool	33–9	Stade Lesdiguières, Grenoble	8 October 1991
13	Iwan Tukalo	1991	Scotland	Zimbabwe	Pool	51–12	Murrayfield, Edinburgh	9 October 1991
14	Gavin Hastings^{T4}	1995	Scotland	Ivory Coast	Pool	89–0	Olympia Park, Rustenburg	26 May 1995
15	Gareth Thomas	1995	Wales	Japan	Pool	57–10	Free State Stadium, Bloemfontein	27 May 1995
16	Marc Ellis^{T6}	1995	New Zealand	Japan	Pool	145–17	Free State Stadium, Bloemfontein	4 June 1995
17	Eric Rush	1995	New Zealand	Japan	Pool	145–17	Free State Stadium, Bloemfontein	4 June 1995
18	Jeff Wilson	1995	New Zealand	Japan	Pool	145–17	Free State Stadium, Bloemfontein	4 June 1995
19	Chester Williams^{T4}	1995	South Africa	Samoa	Quarter-final	42–14	Ellis Park, Johannesburg	10 June 1995
20	Jonah Lomu^{T4}	1995	New Zealand	England	Semi-final	45–29	Newlands, Cape Town	18 June 1995
21	Keith Wood^{T4}	1999	Ireland	United States	Pool	53–8	Lansdowne Road, Dublin	2 October 1999
22	Toutai Kefu	1999	Australia	Romania	Pool	57–9	Ravenhill, Belfast	3 October 1999
23	Ugo Mola	1999	France	Namibia	Pool	47–13	Stade Chaban-Delmas, Bordeaux	8 October 1999
24	Jeff Wilson	1999	New Zealand	Italy	Pool	101–3	Galpharm Stadium, Huddersfield	14 October 1999
25	Jannie de Beer^{D5}	1999	South Africa	England	Quarter-final	44–21	Stade de France, Saint-Denis	24 October 1999
26	Yannick Jauzion	2003	France	Fiji	Pool	61–18	Lang Park, Brisbane	11 October 2003
27	Joost van der Westhuizen	2003	South Africa	Uruguay	Pool	72–6	Subiaco Oval, Perth	11 October 2003
28	Martín Gaitán	2003	Argentina	Namibia	Pool	67–14	Central Coast Stadium, Gosford	14 October 2003
29	Mils Muliaina^{T4}	2003	New Zealand	Canada	Pool	68–6	Docklands Stadium, Melbourne	17 October 2003
30	Mat Rogers	2003	Australia	Romania	Pool	90–8	Lang Park, Brisbane	18 October 2003
31	Matt Giteau	2003	Australia	Namibia	Pool	142–0	Adelaide Oval	25 October 2003
32	Chris Latham^{T5}	2003	Australia	Namibia	Pool	142–0	Adelaide Oval	25 October 2003
33	Lote Tuqiri	2003	Australia	Namibia	Pool	142–0	Adelaide Oval	25 October 2003
34	Brian Liebenberg	2003	France	United States	Pool	41–14	Wollongong Showground	31 October 2003
35	Josh Lewsey^{T5}	2003	England	Uruguay	Pool	111–13	Lang Park, Brisbane	2 November 2003
36	Jonny Wilkinson^{D3}	2003	England	France	Semi-final	24–7	Telstra Stadium, Sydney	16 November 2003
37	Doug Howlett	2007	New Zealand	Italy	Pool	76–14	Stade Vélodrome, Marseille	8 September 2007
38	Rocky Elsom	2007	Australia	Japan	Pool	91–3	Stade de Gerland, Lyon	8 September 2007
39	Bryan Habana^{T4}	2007	South Africa	Samoa	Pool	59–7	Parc des Princes, Paris	9 September 2007
40	Vincent Clerc	2007	France	Namibia	Pool	87–10	Stadium Municipal, Toulouse	16 September 2007
41	Ally Hogg	2007	Scotland	Romania	Pool	42–0	Murrayfield, Edinburgh	18 September 2007
42	Drew Mitchell	2007	Australia	Fiji	Pool	55–12	Stade de la Mosson, Montpellier	23 September 2007
43	Joe Rokocoko	2007	New Zealand	Romania	Pool	85–8	Stadium Municipal, Toulouse	29 September 2007
44	Juan Martín Hernández^{D3}	2007	Argentina	Ireland	Pool	30–15	Parc des Princes, Paris	30 September 2007
45	Theuns Kotzé^{D3}	2011	Namibia	Fiji	Pool	25–49	Rotorua International Stadium	10 September 2011
46	Vereniki Goneva^{T4}	2011	Fiji	Namibia	Pool	49–25	Rotorua International Stadium	10 September 2011
47	Alesana Tuilagi	2011	Samoa	Namibia	Pool	49–12	Rotorua International Stadium	14 September 2011
48	Vincent Clerc	2011	France	Canada	Pool	46–19	McLean Park, Napier	18 September 2011
49	Adam Ashley-Cooper	2011	Australia	United States	Pool	67–5	Wellington Regional Stadium	23 September 2011
50	Mark Cueto	2011	England	Romania	Pool	67–3	Otago Stadium, Dunedin	24 September 2011
51	Chris Ashton	2011	England	Romania	Pool	67–3	Otago Stadium, Dunedin	24 September 2011
52	Scott Williams	2011	Wales	Namibia	Pool	81–7	Yarrow Stadium, New Plymouth	26 September 2011
53	Zac Guildford^{T4}	2011	New Zealand	Canada	Pool	79–15	Wellington Regional Stadium	2 October 2011
54	Cory Allen	2015	Wales	Uruguay	Pool	54–9	Millennium Stadium, Cardiff	20 September 2015
55	JP Pietersen	2015	South Africa	Samoa	Pool	46–6	Villa Park, Birmingham	26 September 2015
56	Julian Savea	2015	New Zealand	Georgia	Pool	43–10	Millennium Stadium, Cardiff	2 October 2015
57	Bryan Habana	2015	South Africa	United States	Pool	64–0	Olympic Stadium, London	7 October 2015
58	Nick Easter	2015	England	Uruguay	Pool	60–3	City of Manchester Stadium	10 October 2015
59	Jack Nowell	2015	England	Uruguay	Pool	60–3	City of Manchester Stadium	10 October 2015
60	Julian Savea	2015	New Zealand	France	Quarter-final	62–13	Millennium Stadium, Cardiff	17 October 2015
61	Adam Ashley-Cooper	2015	Australia	Argentina	Semi-final	29–15	Twickenham, London	25 October 2015
62	Kotaro Matsushima	2019	Japan	Russia	Pool	30–10	Tokyo Stadium, Chōfu	20 September 2019
63	Julián Montoya	2019	Argentina	Tonga	Pool	28–12	Hanazono Rugby Stadium, Higashiōsaka	28 September 2019
64	Cobus Reinach	2019	South Africa	Canada	Pool	66–7	Kobe Misaki Stadium, Kobe	8 October 2019
65	George Horne	2019	Scotland	Russia	Pool	61–0	Shizuoka Stadium Ecopa, Fukuroi	9 October 2019
66	Josh Adams	2019	Wales	Fiji	Pool	29–17	Oita Stadium, Ōita	9 October 2019
67	George Ford^{D3}	2023	England	Argentina	Pool	27–10	Stade Vélodrome, Marseille	9 September 2023
68	Cobus Reinach	2023	South Africa	Romania	Pool	76–0	Nouveau Stade de Bordeaux, Bordeaux	17 September 2023
69	Makazole Mapimpi	2023	South Africa	Romania	Pool	76–0	Nouveau Stade de Bordeaux, Bordeaux	17 September 2023
70	Damian Penaud	2023	France	Namibia	Pool	96–0	Stade Vélodrome, Marseille	21 September 2023
71	Henry Arundell^{T5}	2023	England	Chile	Pool	71–0	Stade Pierre-Mauroy, Lille	23 September 2023
72	Aaron Smith	2023	New Zealand	Italy	Pool	96–17	Parc Olympique Lyonnais, Décines-Charpieu	29 September 2023
73	Darcy Graham^{T4}	2023	Scotland	Romania	Pool	84–0	Stade Pierre-Mauroy, Lille	30 September 2023
74	Leicester Fainga'anuku	2023	New Zealand	Uruguay	Pool	73–0	Parc Olympique Lyonnais, Décines-Charpieu	5 October 2023
75	Louis Rees-Zammit	2023	Wales	Georgia	Pool	43–19	Stade de la Beaujoire, Nantes	7 October 2023
76	Mateo Carreras	2023	Argentina	Japan	Pool	39–27	Stade de la Beaujoire, Nantes	8 October 2023
77	Will Jordan	2023	New Zealand	Argentina	Semi-final	44–6	Stade de France, Saint-Denis	20 October 2023

=== Multiple hat-tricks ===
Player	Hat-tricks	Years
(New Zealand) Jeff Wilson	2	1995, 1999
(France) Vincent Clerc	2	2007, 2011
(South Africa) Bryan Habana	2	2007, 2015
(New Zealand) Julian Savea	2	2015
(Australia) Adam Ashley-Cooper	2	2011, 2015
(South Africa) Cobus Reinach	2	2019, 2023

=== By national team ===
Team	Scored	Conceded
New Zealand	17	0
Australia	9	0
South Africa	9	0
England	9	2
France	9	2
Wales	7	0
Scotland	6	0
Argentina	4	3
Ireland	3	1
Samoa	1	3
Japan	1	7
Fiji	1	7
Namibia	1	10
Chile	0	1
Ivory Coast	0	1
Georgia	0	2
Russia	0	2
Italy	0	3
Tonga	0	3
Zimbabwe	0	4
Canada	0	5
United States	0	5
Uruguay	0	6
Romania	0	10
