= 2000 Mandela Challenge Plate =

2000 Mandela Challenge Plate Test
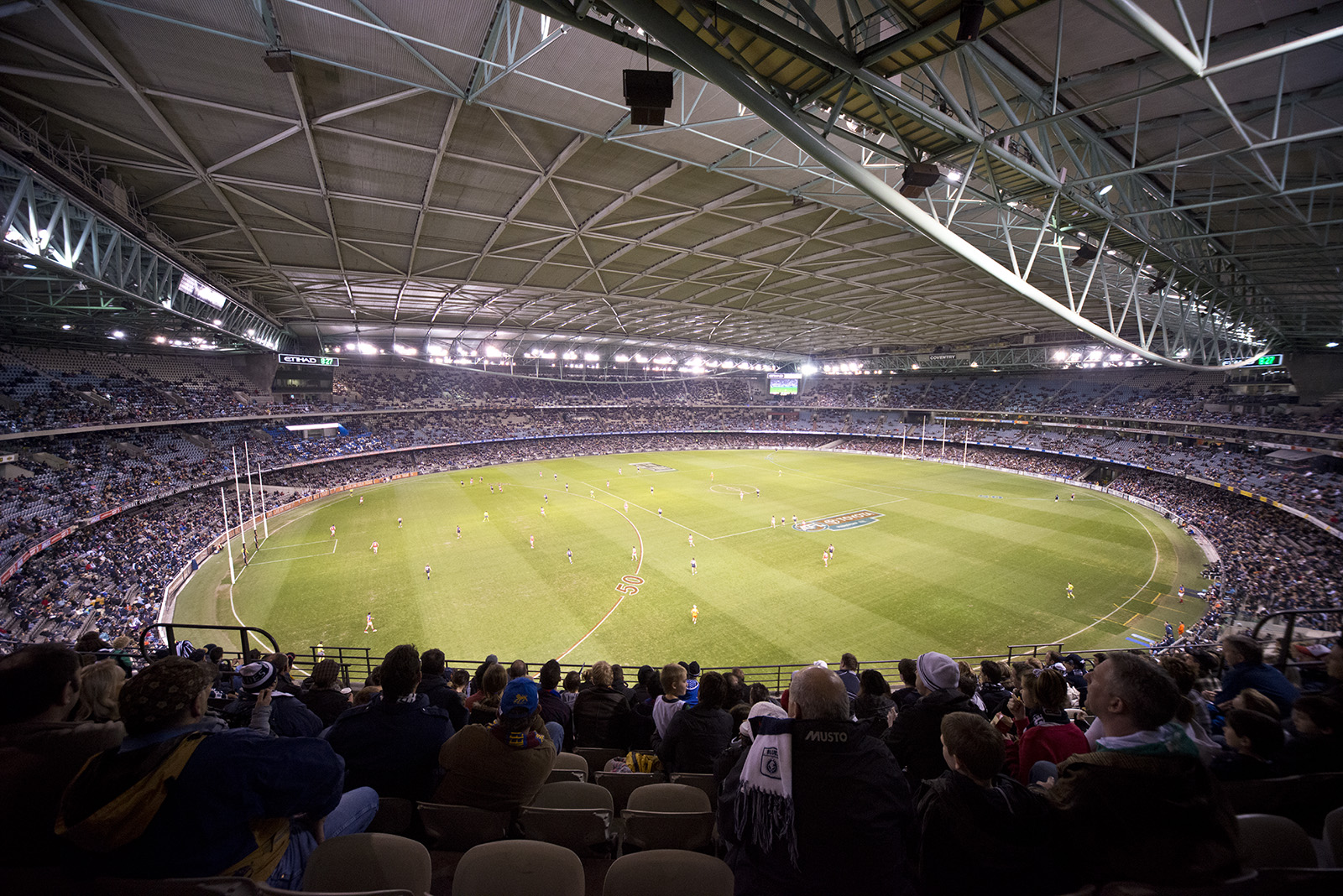
- Docklands Stadium hosted the Test
- Event: Mandela Challenge Plate; Australia–South Africa Test
Australia	South Africa
44	23
- Date: 8 July 2000
- Venue: Docklands Stadium, Docklands, Melbourne
- Man of the Match: Chris Latham (Australia)
- Referee: Paddy O'Brien (New Zealand)
- Attendance: 34,042

The 2000 Mandela Challenge Plate Test was a one-off rugby union Test match played between Australia and South Africa inaugurating their shared trophy known as the Mandela Challenge Plate. The match was played on 8 July 2000 in Melbourne's Docklands Stadium. Australia won the Test match 44–23 in front of a 34,042 attendance.

== Background ==
In November 1999, just weeks after Australia had won the Rugby World Cup, it was reported by The Sydney Morning Herald that Australia and South Africa were set to being a new annual contest from July the following year, pending a sign off from the South African Rugby Football Union (SARFU). Australian Rugby Union (ARU) chief John O'Neill stated that if the deal was agreed to, his goal would be to bring former South African President Nelson Mandela to Melbourne to launch the event, which had yet to have a name. In March 2000, the proposal was agreed to by SARFU, with Nelson Mandela giving his blessing on the new contests award. The match was scheduled for Docklands Stadium, a venue typically used for cricket and Australian Football League matches. Although Australia had played matches at the nearby Melbourne Cricket Ground (MCG) in the past, ARU chief O'Neill stated that playing at Docklands Stadium was motivated by broadcast rights, the stadium facilities, and the capacity for Docklands Stadium to be converted to a rectangular venue. In May 2000, Nelson Mandela declined the invitation to the match, although he was interviewed live by Australian commentator Gordon Bray before kick off.

In the lead up to the Test match, Australia had been on a nine-match win streak, one short of their record. This streak included a win against the Springboks in the Semi-finals of the 1999 Rugby World Cup; France in the 1999 Rugby World Cup final; and New Zealand in a record 21-point margin in front of a Test record crowd of 107,042 in the 1999 Tri Nations Series. A day before the match, the Test was criticised by The Sydney Morning Herald, calling the match a "friendly" and criticising the Springboks for sending a "B team".

== Match ==
8 July 2000
20:00 AEST (UTC+10)

Australia	44–23	South Africa
Try: Mortlock (2) 35' m, 80' m Larkham 67' c Kefu 69' c Little 75' m Con: Mortlock (2/5) 68', 70'; Pen: Mortlock (5/6) 10', 17', 26', 29', 58'	Report	Try: Swanepoel 14' m Paulse (2) 21' c, 32' m Con: Koen (1/3) 22'; Pen: Koen (2/2) 2', 39'

Docklands Stadium, Melbourne
Attendance: 34,042
Referee: Paddy O'Brien (New Zealand)

Australia	South Africa

FB	15	Chris Latham
RW	14	Stirling Mortlock
OC	13	Dan Herbert
IC	12	Rod Kafer
LW	11	Joe Roff
FH	10	Stephen Larkham
SH	9	George Gregan
N8	8	Jim Williams
OF	7	David Wilson
BF	6	Mark Connors
RL	5	John Eales (c)
LL	4	David Giffin
TP	3	Fletcher Dyson
HK	2	Michael Foley
LP	1	Richard Harry
Substitutes:
HK	16	Jeremy Paul
PR	17	Glenn Panoho
BR	18	Troy Jaques
BR	19	Toutai Kefu
SH	20	Sam Cordingley
CE	21	Jason Little
Coach:
Rod Macqueen

FB	15	Percy Montgomery
RW	14	Breyton Paulse
OC	13	Robbie Fleck
IC	12	Japie Mulder
LW	11	Thinus Delport
FH	10	Louis Koen
SH	9	Werner Swanepoel
N8	8	André Vos (c)
OF	7	André Venter
BF	6	Rassie Erasmus
RL	5	Albert van den Berg
LL	4	Krynauw Otto
TP	3	Cobus Visagie
HK	2	Charl Marais
LP	1	Robbie Kempson
Substitutes:
HK	16	John Smit
PR	17	Ollie le Roux
BR	18	Corné Krige
SH	19	Joost van der Westhuizen
CE	20	De Wet Barry
WG	21	Chester Williams
Coach:
Nick Mallett

Man of the Match:
Chris Latham (Australia)

Notes:

- Troy Jaques (Australia) and Louis Koen (South Africa) made their Test debuts.
- Australia's 44 points was the most they had scored against South Africa in the pairs history.
- Stirling Mortlock's (Australia) 29 points scored was the highest tally achieved by a player against the Springboks, surpassing England's 27 points achieved by Rob Andrew (1994) and Jonny Wilkinson (2000).
- Australia equaled their highest win-streak in Test matches (10).
