= 2000 Tri Nations Series =

Final positions
- Champions: Australia (1st title)
- Bledisloe Cup: Australia

Tournament statistics
- Matches played: 6
- Tries scored: 29 (4.83 per match)
- Attendance: 63,609 (10,602 per match)
- Top scorer(s): Andrew Mehrtens (77)
- Most tries: Christian Cullen (7)

The 2000 Tri Nations Series was the fifth Tri Nations Series, an annual rugby union competition contested by the national rugby union teams of Australia, New Zealand and South Africa. It was played from 15 July to 26 August 2000. Australia won the tournament for the first time after a 19–18 win over South Africa in Durban.

The opening game of the tournament between Australia and New Zealand attracted a world record rugby union crowd of 109,874 to Stadium Australia.

Australia made it three wins in a row in the Bledisloe Cup, having taken it from New Zealand in 1998.

== Table ==
Place	Nation	Games				Points			Try bonus	Losing bonus	Table points
Place	Nation	Played	Won	Drawn	Lost	For	Against	Diff	Try bonus	Losing bonus	Table points
1	Australia	4	3	0	1	104	86	+18	1	1	14
2	New Zealand	4	2	0	2	127	117	+10	2	2	12
3	South Africa	4	1	0	3	82	110	−28	1	1	6

== Results ==
=== Round 1 ===
15 July 2000
20:00 AEST (UTC+10)

(2 BP) Australia	35–39	New Zealand (1 BP)
Try: Mortlock (2); Latham; Roff; Paul; Con: Mortlock (2); Pen: Mortlock (2)		Try: Umaga; Alatini; Cullen; Marshall; Lomu; Con: Mehrtens (4); Pen: Mehrtens (2)

Stadium Australia, Sydney
Attendance: 109,874
Referee: André Watson (South Africa)

FB	15	Chris Latham
RW	14	Stirling Mortlock
OC	13	Daniel Herbert
IC	12	Jason Little
LW	11	Joe Roff
FH	10	Stephen Larkham
SH	9	George Gregan
N8	8	Jim Williams
OF	7	David Wilson
BF	6	Mark Connors
RL	5	John Eales (c)
LL	4	David Giffin
TP	3	Fletcher Dyson
HK	2	Michael Foley
LP	1	Richard Harry
Replacements:
HK	16	Jeremy Paul
PR	17	Glen Panoho
LF	18	Troy Jaques
N8	19	Toutai Kefu
SH	20	Sam Cordingley
FH	21	Rod Kafer
WG	22	Andrew Walker
Coach:
Rod Macqueen

FB	15	Christian Cullen
RW	14	Tana Umaga
OC	13	Alama Ieremia
IC	12	Pita Alatini
LW	11	Jonah Lomu
FH	10	Andrew Mehrtens
SH	9	Justin Marshall
N8	8	Ron Cribb
OF	7	Scott Robertson
BF	6	Taine Randell
RL	5	Norm Maxwell
LL	4	Todd Blackadder (c)
TP	3	Kees Meeuws
HK	2	Anton Oliver
LP	1	Carl Hoeft
Replacements:
HK	16	Mark Hammett
PR	17	Craig Dowd
LK	18	Troy Flavell
FL	19	Josh Kronfeld
SH	20	Byron Kelleher
FH	21	Tony Brown
FB	22	Leon MacDonald
Coach:
Wayne Smith

=== Round 2 ===
22 July 2000
19:35 NZST (UTC+12)

New Zealand	25–12	South Africa
Try: Cullen (2); Pen: Mehrtens (3); Brown; Drop: Mehrtens		Pen: Van Straaten (3); Drop: Montgomery

Lancaster Park, Christchurch
Attendance: 49,000
Referee: Chris White (England)

FB	15	Christian Cullen
RW	14	Tana Umaga
OC	13	Mark Robinson
IC	12	Pita Alatini
LW	11	Jonah Lomu
FH	10	Andrew Mehrtens
SH	9	Justin Marshall
N8	8	Ron Cribb
OF	7	Josh Kronfeld
BF	6	Taine Randell
RL	5	Troy Flavell
LL	4	Todd Blackadder (c)
TP	3	Kees Meeuws
HK	2	Anton Oliver
LP	1	Carl Hoeft
Replacements:
HK	16	Mark Hammett
PR	17	Craig Dowd
LK	18	Norm Maxwell
FL	19	Scott Robertson
SH	20	Byron Kelleher
FH	21	Tony Brown
FB	22	Leon MacDonald
Coach:
Wayne Smith

FB	15	Percy Montgomery
RW	14	Breyton Paulse
OC	13	Robbie Fleck
IC	12	De Wet Barry
LW	11	Thinus Delport
FH	10	Braam van Straaten
SH	9	Werner Swanepoel
N8	8	André Vos (c)
BF	7	Rassie Erasmus
OF	6	Corné Krige
RL	5	André Venter
LL	4	Albert van den Berg
TP	3	Cobus Visagie
HK	2	Charl Marais
LP	1	Robbi Kempson
Replacements:
HK	16	John Smit
PR	17	Willie Meyer
LK	18	Jannes Labuschagne
FL	19	Warren Brosnihan
SH	20	Joost van der Westhuizen
CE	21	Grant Esterhuizen
WG	22	Chester Williams
Coach:
Nick Mallett

=== Round 3 ===
29 July 2000
20:00 AEST (UTC+10)

Australia	26–6	South Africa
Try: Mortlock; Paul; Con: Mortlock (2); Pen: Mortlock (4)		Pen: Van Straaten (2)

Stadium Australia, Sydney
Attendance: 77,048
Referee: Ed Morrison (England)

FB	15	Chris Latham
RW	14	Stirling Mortlock
OC	13	Daniel Herbert
IC	12	Jason Little
LW	11	Joe Roff
FH	10	Stephen Larkham
SH	9	George Gregan
N8	8	Jim Williams
OF	7	David Wilson
BF	6	Mark Connors
RL	5	John Eales (c)
LL	4	David Giffin
TP	3	Fletcher Dyson
HK	2	Michael Foley
LP	1	Richard Harry
Replacements:
HK	16	Jeremy Paul
PR	17	Glen Panoho
LK	18	Matt Cockbain
N8	19	Toutai Kefu
SH	20	Sam Cordingley
FH	21	Rod Kafer
WG	22	Ben Tune
Coach:
Rod Macqueen

FB	15	Thinus Delport
RW	14	Breyton Paulse
OC	13	Robbie Fleck
IC	12	De Wet Barry
LW	11	Pieter Rossouw
FH	10	Braam van Straaten
SH	9	Werner Swanepoel
N8	8	André Vos (c)
BF	7	André Venter
OF	6	Corné Krige
RL	5	Mark Andrews
LL	4	Albert van den Berg
TP	3	Cobus Visagie
HK	2	Charl Marais
LP	1	Robbi Kempson
Replacements:
HK	16	John Smit
PR	17	Ollie le Roux
LK	18	Jannes Labuschagne
FL	19	Warren Brosnihan
SH	20	Joost van der Westhuizen
FB	21	Percy Montgomery
WG	22	Chester Williams
Coach:
Nick Mallett

=== Round 4 ===
5 August 2000
19:35 NZST (UTC+12)

(1 BP) New Zealand	23–24	Australia
Try: Cullen (2); Con: Mehrtens (2); Pen: Mehrtens (3)		Try: Mortlock; Roff; Con: Mortlock; Pen: Eales; Mortlock (3)

Wellington Regional Stadium, Wellington
Attendance: 36,500
Referee: Jonathan Kaplan (South Africa)

FB	15	Christian Cullen
RW	14	Tana Umaga
OC	13	Alama Ieremia
IC	12	Pita Alatini
LW	11	Jonah Lomu
FH	10	Andrew Mehrtens
SH	9	Justin Marshall
N8	8	Ron Cribb
OF	7	Josh Kronfeld
BF	6	Taine Randell
RL	5	Norm Maxwell
LL	4	Todd Blackadder (c)
TP	3	Kees Meeuws
HK	2	Anton Oliver
LP	1	Carl Hoeft
Replacements:
HK	16	Mark Hammett
PR	17	Craig Dowd
LK	18	Troy Flavell
FL	19	Reuben Thorne
SH	20	Byron Kelleher
FH	21	Tony Brown
FB	22	Leon MacDonald
Coach:
Wayne Smith

FB	15	Chris Latham
RW	14	Stirling Mortlock
OC	13	Daniel Herbert
IC	12	Jason Little
LW	11	Joe Roff
FH	10	Stephen Larkham
SH	9	George Gregan
N8	8	Jim Williams
OF	7	David Wilson
BF	6	Toutai Kefu
RL	5	John Eales (c)
LL	4	David Giffin
TP	3	Fletcher Dyson
HK	2	Michael Foley
LP	1	Richard Harry
Replacements:
HK	16	Jeremy Paul
PR	17	Glen Panoho
LK	18	Matt Cockbain
FL	19	Mark Connors
SH	20	Sam Cordingley
FH	21	Rod Kafer
WG	22	Ben Tune
Coach:
Rod Macqueen

=== Round 5 ===
19 August 2000
15:00 SAST (UTC+02)

(1 BP) South Africa	46–40	New Zealand (2 BP)
Try: Delport; Fleck (2); Swanepoel (2); Williams; Con: Van Straaten (5); Pen: Van Straaten (2)		Try: Cullen (2); Umaga (2); Con: Mehrtens (4); Pen: Mehrtens (3); Drop: Mehrtens

Ellis Park Stadium, Johannesburg
Attendance: 57,233
Referee: Andrew Cole (Australia)

FB	15	Thinus Delport
RW	14	Breyton Paulse
OC	13	Grant Esterhuizen
IC	12	Robbie Fleck
LW	11	Chester Williams
FH	10	Braam van Straaten
SH	9	Werner Swanepoel
N8	8	André Vos (c)
BF	7	Rassie Erasmus
OF	6	Corné Krige
RL	5	André Venter
LL	4	Mark Andrews
TP	3	Cobus Visagie
HK	2	Charl Marais
LP	1	Ollie le Roux
Replacements:
HK	16	John Smit
PR	17	Willie Meyer
LK	18	Albert van den Berg
FL	19	Warren Brosnihan
SH	20	Joost van der Westhuizen
FH	21	Jaco van der Westhuyzen
FB	22	Percy Montgomery
Coach:
Nick Mallett

FB	15	Christian Cullen
RW	14	Tana Umaga
OC	13	Alama Ieremia
IC	12	Pita Alatini
LW	11	Jonah Lomu
FH	10	Andrew Mehrtens
SH	9	Justin Marshall
N8	8	Ron Cribb
OF	7	Josh Kronfeld
BF	6	Taine Randell
RL	5	Norm Maxwell
LL	4	Todd Blackadder (c)
TP	3	Kees Meeuws
HK	2	Anton Oliver
LP	1	Carl Hoeft
Replacements:
HK	16	Mark Hammett
PR	17	Greg Somerville
LK	18	Troy Flavell
FL	19	Scott Robertson
SH	20	Byron Kelleher
FH	21	Tony Brown
FB	22	Leon MacDonald
Coach:
Wayne Smith

=== Round 6 ===
26 August 2000
15:00 SAST (UTC+02)

(1 BP) South Africa	18–19	Australia
Pen: Van Straaten (6)		Try: Latham; Con: Mortlock; Pen: Mortlock (4)

Kings Park Stadium, Durban
Attendance: 52,000
Referee: Paul Honiss (New Zealand)

FB	15	Thinus Delport
RW	14	Chester Williams
OC	13	Grant Esterhuizen
IC	12	Robbie Fleck
LW	11	Breyton Paulse
FH	10	Braam van Straaten
SH	9	Werner Swanepoel
N8	8	André Vos (c)
BF	7	Corné Krige
OF	6	Rassie Erasmus
RL	5	Mark Andrews
LL	4	André Venter
TP	3	Cobus Visagie
HK	2	Charl Marais
LP	1	Robbi Kempson
Replacements:
HK	16	John Smit
PR	17	Ollie le Roux
LK	18	Albert van den Berg
FL	19	Warren Brosnihan
SH	20	Joost van der Westhuizen
FH	21	Jaco van der Westhuyzen
FB	22	Percy Montgomery
Coach:
Nick Mallett

FB	15	Chris Latham
RW	14	Stirling Mortlock
OC	13	Daniel Herbert
IC	12	Jason Little
LW	11	Joe Roff
FH	10	Stephen Larkham
SH	9	George Gregan
N8	8	Jim Williams
OF	7	David Wilson
BF	6	Mark Connors
RL	5	John Eales (c)
LL	4	David Giffin
TP	3	Fletcher Dyson
HK	2	Michael Foley
LP	1	Richard Harry
Replacements:
HK	16	Jeremy Paul
PR	17	Glen Panoho
LK	18	Matt Cockbain
FL	19	Toutai Kefu
SH	20	Sam Cordingley
FH	21	Rod Kafer
WG	22	Ben Tune
Coach:
Rod Macqueen
