= Rugby Aid =

Rugby Aid is a rugby union organisation that is supported by World Rugby, formally known as the International Rugby Board (IRB), to aid in global charities of different causes. In 2005, the first match took place to raise money for the United Nations World Food Programme to support its work aiding victims of the 2004 Indian Ocean tsunami. While in 2011, saw a repeat of the fixture in aid of Help for Heroes, and in 2015, an England vs Rest of the World XV match took place in aid of the same charity. In 2015, confectionery brand Mentos was unveiled as an official sponsor of the event.

== Results ==
=== 2005 ===
5 March 2005
14:30

Northern Hemisphere	19–54	Southern Hemisphere
Try: Titterrell 18' c Sanderson 27' m Bergamasco 60' c Con: Humphreys (1/2) 19'; Sweeney (1/1) 61'; Pen: Humphreys (0/3)	Report	Try: Umaga 13' c Lima 25' c Latham (2) 33' c, 62' c Burger 40' c Sititi (2) 50' c, 76' m Fourie 74' c Con: Mehrtens (6/6) 14', 25', 34', 40', 51', 63'; Latham (1/2) 75'; Pen: Mehrtens (0/2)

Twickenham, London
Attendance: 40,426
Referee: Paddy O'Brien (New Zealand)

FB	15	(Scotland) Chris Paterson
RW	14	(Italy) Mirco Bergamasco
OC	13	(England) Ollie Smith
IC	12	(Wales) Ceri Sweeney
LW	11	(England) Ben Cohen
FH	10	(Ireland) David Humphreys
SH	9	(Wales) Gareth Cooper
N8	8	(Scotland) Simon Taylor
OF	7	(England) Pat Sanderson
BF	6	(England) Lawrence Dallaglio (c)
RL	5	(Ireland) Donncha O'Callaghan
LL	4	(Italy) Marco Bortolami
TP	3	(Wales) Chris Horsman
HK	2	(England) Andy Titterrell
LP	1	(Wales) John Yapp
Replacements:
HK	16	(France) Raphaël Ibanez
PR	17	(France) Cédric Soulette
N8	18	(Ireland) Eric Miller
LK	19	(Wales) Jonathan Thomas
SH	20	(Wales) Mike Phillips
CE	21	(Wales) Mark Taylor
WG	22	(England) Mathew Tait
Pitchside
(Ireland) Brian O'Driscoll
Coach:
(England) Clive Woodward

FB	15	(Australia) Chris Latham
RW	14	(Samoa) Brian Lima
OC	13	(South Africa) Jaque Fourie
IC	12	(New Zealand) Tana Umaga
LW	11	(Fiji) Sereli Bobo
FH	10	(New Zealand) Andrew Mehrtens
SH	9	(Australia) George Gregan (c)
N8	8	(Australia) Toutai Kefu
OF	7	(Australia) Phil Waugh
BF	6	(South Africa) Schalk Burger
RL	5	(South Africa) Victor Matfield
LL	4	(New Zealand) Matt Mustchin
TP	3	(South Africa) Cobus Visagie
HK	2	(South Africa) John Smit
LP	1	(New Zealand) Carl Hoeft
Replacements:
HK	16	(Tonga) Ephraim Taukafa
PR	17	(Argentina) Eusebio Guiñazu
FL	18	(Samoa) Semo Sititi
LK	19	(Samoa) Opeta Palepoi
SH	20	(Fiji) Moses Rauluni
WG	21	(South Africa) Thinus Delport
FH	22	(Australia) Shane Drahm
Coach:
(Australia) Rod Macqueen

Notes:

- Northern Hemisphere player Chris Horsman was not internationally capped.
- Southern Hemisphere players Matt Mustchin and Shane Drahm were not internationally capped.

=== 2011 ===
3 December 2011
14:30

Northern Hemisphere	22–36	Southern Hemisphere
Try: Spurling 11' c Gleeson 67' c Cummings 78' m Con: Cummings (2/3) 12', 68'; Pen: Cummings (1) 26'	Report	Try: Thomson 13' c Willison 22' c Ras 38' c Drauniniu 49' c Van Vuuren 74' m Con: Ebersohn (2/2) 14', 23'; Little (2/3) 39', 50'; Pen: Ebersohn (1) 18'

Twickenham, London
Attendance: 29,251
Referee: Chris White (England)

FB	15	(Wales) Ceri Cummings
RW	14	(Wales) Eli Walker
OC	13	(Ireland) Tom Gleeson
IC	12	(England) Ben Cohen
LW	11	(England) Anthony Watson
FH	10	(Zimbabwe) Nils Mordt
SH	9	(England) Dave Pascoe
N8	8	(Fiji) Ifereimi Boladau
OF	7	(France) Serge Betsen
BF	6	(Ireland) Alan Quinlan
RL	5	(England) Hugh Vyvyan (c)
LL	4	(England) Danny Grewcock
TP	3	(England) Duncan Bell
HK	2	(England) Scott Spurling
LP	1	(Georgia (country)) Akvsenti Giorgadze
Replacements:
HK	16	(Scotland) Gordon Bulloch
PR	18	(Scotland) Tom Smith
PR	18	(Wales) Peter Edwards
LK	19	(England) Marshall Cormack
N8	20	(Wales) Andrew Tibbatts
SH	21	(England) Chris Cook
FH	22	(England) Will Greenwood
WG	23	(England) Nathan Jones
CE	24	(Wales) Sonny Parker
FB	25	(Wales) Jordan Williams
Coach:
(England) Dean Ryan

FB	15	(Australia) Joe Roff
RW	14	(New Zealand) Ahtun Masun
OC	13	(New Zealand) Jackson Willison
IC	12	(South Africa) Andries Strauss
LW	11	(South Africa) Kobus Basson
FH	10	(South Africa) Sias Ebersohn
SH	9	(New Zealand) Justin Marshall
N8	8	(Samoa) Zac Feau’nati
OF	7	(South Africa) AJ Venter
BF	6	(New Zealand) Adam Thomson (c)
RL	5	(New Zealand) Jeremy Thrush
LL	4	(South Africa) Inus Ras
TP	3	(England) Tom Mercey
HK	2	(South Africa) PW van Vuuren
LP	1	(Tonga) Sona Taumalolo
Replacements:
HK	16	(Tonga) Ephraim Taukafa
PR	17	(New Zealand) Jo Tuala
PR	18	(Australia) Ben Radmall
LK	19	(Australia) Justin Harrison
FL	20	(Australia) Phil Waugh
SH	21	(Australia) Tony Luxford
FH	22	(Fiji) Nicky Little
FH	23	(New Zealand) Dane Berghan
WG	24	(England) Josh Drauniniu
CE	25	(Australia) Ed Yarnton
Coach:
(South Africa) Nick Mallett

== See also ==
- Football for Hope
- World Cricket Tsunami Appeal
