= History of rugby union matches between Australia and South Africa =

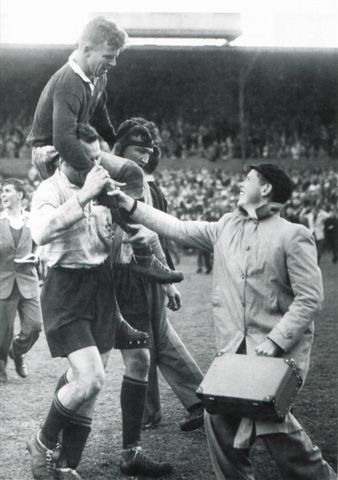
Wallaby captain John Solomon chaired by two Springbok players, 2nd Test 1953

The contest between Australia (Wallabies) and South Africa (Springboks) is one of the major rivalries in international rugby union. Since 1996, the two teams have competed in the annual Rugby Championship (formerly known as the Tri Nations Series), and since the 2000s, they have contested for the Mandela Challenge Plate. The teams' first meeting was on 8 July 1933 at Newlands Stadium in Cape Town in the first of five tests on the 1933 Australia tour of South Africa and Rhodesia. The test was won 17–3 by South Africa who also won the series 3–2.

Before the era of sporting boycotts, South Africa dominated the early encounters up to 1971.

Both sides have exhibited a considerable home advantage, with the Springboks winning more than 75% of matches played in South Africa, and the Wallabies winning more than 60% of matches played in Australia.

In the amateur era, the Springboks made five tours to Australia, and were undefeated in three of them. South Africa won three of the five test series they played in Australia; 2–0 in 1937, 2–0 in 1956 and 3–0 in 1971. By contrast, the Wallabies made six tours to South Africa, only once making it through undefeated, albeit on a tour comprising only four matches and one test in 1992. Prior to that, Australia's best away tour was the 2-all drawn test series of 1963.

Prior to 1972, South African teams were racially selected, organised by the whites-only South African Rugby Board (SARB). Australia then supported the international boycott of sporting contacts with South Africa over the issue of apartheid. The teams did not meet again until 1992, when apartheid was being dismantled and the South African Rugby Board had merged with the non-racial South African Rugby Union (SARU). Since that time Australia has won just over 50% of their games and has won the Mandela Challenge Plate nine times in the twelve years since its inception.

In the professional era, extended tours of each country have been replaced by participation in an annual series involving the top teams of the Southern Hemisphere. From 1996 through 2011, Australia and South Africa competed alongside New Zealand in the Tri Nations Series. Starting in 2012, the three nations competed alongside Argentina in The Rugby Championship. In the Tri Nations Series era, the Wallabies and Springboks played two or three encounters each year on a home-and-away basis; the Rugby Championship features two annual encounters, also on a home-and-away basis.

== Rugby World Cup ==
Australia and South Africa have met three times in the Rugby World Cup. In 1995 they were drawn in the same pool and host nation South Africa won 27–18, going on to win the cup. In 1999 Australia knocked South Africa out of the competition in a semi-final at Twickenham, winning 27–21, after extra-time. In 2011, Australia again knocked South Africa out of the competition, in a quarter-final at Westpac Stadium in Wellington, winning 11–9.

== Summary ==
=== Overall ===
Details	Played	Won by Australia	Won by South Africa	Drawn	Australia points	South Africa points
In Australia	46	29	15	2	994	827
In South Africa	50	11	38	1	742	1,156
Neutral venue	2	2	0	0	38	30
Overall	98	42	53	3	1,774	2,013

=== Records ===
Note: Date shown in brackets indicates when the record was or last set.

Record	Australia	South Africa
Longest winning streak	5 (4 September 2010 – 29 September 2012)	7 (19 September 1953 – 10 August 1963; 2 August 1969 – 29 August 1992)
Largest points for
Home	49 (15 July 2006)	61 (23 August 1997)
Away	41 (4 September 2010)	38 (7 September 2013)
Largest winning margin
Home	49 (15 July 2006)	45 (30 August 2008)
Away	23 (29 August 1992)	26 (7 September 2013, 10 August 2024)
Largest aggregate score
83 (South Africa 61–22 Australia) (23 August 1997)

== Results ==
No.	Date	Venue	Score	Winner	Competition
1	8 July 1933	Newlands Stadium, Cape Town	17–3	South Africa	1933 Australia tour of South Africa
2	22 July 1933	Kingsmead Cricket Ground, Durban	6–21	Australia	1933 Australia tour of South Africa
3	12 August 1933	Ellis Park Stadium, Johannesburg	12–3	South Africa	1933 Australia tour of South Africa
4	26 August 1933	St George's Park, Port Elizabeth	11–0	South Africa	1933 Australia tour of South Africa
5	2 September 1933	Springbok Park, Bloemfontein	4–15	Australia	1933 Australia tour of South Africa
6	26 June 1937	Sydney Cricket Ground, Sydney	5–9	South Africa	1937 South Africa tour of Australia and New Zealand
7	17 July 1937	Sydney Cricket Ground, Sydney	17–26	South Africa	1937 South Africa tour of Australia and New Zealand
8	22 August 1953	Ellis Park Stadium, Johannesburg	25–3	South Africa	1953 Australia tour of South Africa
9	5 September 1953	Newlands Stadium, Cape Town	14–18	Australia	1953 Australia tour of South Africa
10	19 September 1953	Kingsmead, Durban	18–8	South Africa	1953 Australia tour of South Africa
11	26 September 1953	St George's Park, Port Elizabeth	22–9	South Africa	1953 Australia tour of South Africa
12	26 May 1956	Sydney Cricket Ground, Sydney	0–9	South Africa	1956 South Africa tour of Australia and New Zealand
13	2 June 1956	Brisbane Exhibition Ground, Brisbane	0–9	South Africa	1956 South Africa tour of Australia and New Zealand
14	5 August 1961	Ellis Park Stadium, Johannesburg	28–3	South Africa	1961 Australia tour of South Africa
15	12 August 1961	Boet Erasmus Stadium, Port Elizabeth	23–11	South Africa	1961 Australia tour of South Africa
16	13 July 1963	Loftus Versfeld Stadium, Pretoria	14–3	South Africa	1963 Australia tour of South Africa
17	10 August 1963	Newlands Stadium, Cape Town	5–9	Australia	1963 Australia tour of South Africa
18	24 August 1963	Ellis Park Stadium, Johannesburg	9–11	Australia	1963 Australia tour of South Africa
19	7 September 1963	Boet Erasmus Stadium, Port Elizabeth	22–6	South Africa	1963 Australia tour of South Africa
20	19 June 1965	Sydney Cricket Ground, Sydney	18–11	Australia	1965 South Africa tour of Australia and New Zealand
21	26 June 1965	Lang Park, Brisbane	12–8	Australia	1965 South Africa tour of Australia and New Zealand
22	2 August 1969	Ellis Park Stadium, Johannesburg	30–11	South Africa	1969 Australia tour of South Africa
23	16 August 1969	Kings Park Stadium, Durban	16–9	South Africa	1969 Australia tour of South Africa
24	6 September 1969	Newlands Stadium, Cape Town	11–3	South Africa	1969 Australia tour of South Africa
25	20 September 1969	Free State Stadium, Bloemfontein	19–8	South Africa	1969 Australia tour of South Africa
26	17 July 1971	Sydney Cricket Ground, Sydney	11–19	South Africa	1971 South Africa tour of Australia
27	31 July 1971	Brisbane Exhibition Ground, Brisbane	6–14	South Africa	1971 South Africa tour of Australia
28	7 August 1971	Sydney Cricket Ground, Sydney	6–18	South Africa	1971 South Africa tour of Australia
29	29 August 1992	Newlands Stadium, Cape Town	3–26	Australia	1992 Australia tour of South Africa
30	31 July 1993	Sydney Football Stadium, Sydney	12–19	South Africa	1993 South Africa tour of Australia
31	14 August 1993	Ballymore Stadium, Brisbane	28–20	Australia	1993 South Africa tour of Australia
32	21 August 1993	Sydney Football Stadium, Sydney	19–12	Australia	1993 South Africa tour of Australia
33	25 May 1995	Newlands Stadium, Cape Town	18–27	South Africa	1995 Rugby World Cup
34	13 July 1996	Sydney Football Stadium, Sydney	21–16	Australia	1996 Tri Nations Series
35	3 August 1996	Free State Stadium, Bloemfentein	25–19	South Africa	1996 Tri Nations Series
36	2 August 1997	Lang Park, Brisbane	32–20	Australia	1997 Tri Nations Series
37	23 August 1997	Loftus Versfeld Stadium, Pretoria	61–22	South Africa	1997 Tri Nations Series
38	18 July 1998	Subiaco Oval, Perth	13–14	South Africa	1998 Tri Nations Series
39	22 August 1998	Ellis Park Stadium, Johannesburg	29–15	South Africa	1998 Tri Nations Series
40	17 July 1999	Lang Park, Brisbane	32–6	Australia	1999 Tri Nations Series
41	14 August 1999	Newlands Stadium, Cape Town	10–9	South Africa	1999 Tri Nations Series
42	30 October 1999	Twickenham Stadium, London (England)	27–21	Australia	1999 Rugby World Cup
43	8 July 2000	Docklands Stadium, Melbourne	44–23	Australia	2000 Mandela Challenge Plate
44	29 July 2000	Stadium Australia, Sydney	26–6	Australia	2000 Tri Nations Series
45	26 August 2000	Kings Park Stadium, Durban	18–19	Australia	2000 Tri Nations Series
46	28 July 2001	Loftus Versfeld Stadium, Pretoria	20–15	South Africa	2001 Tri Nations Series
47	18 August 2001	Subiaco Oval, Perth	14–14	draw	2001 Tri Nations Series
48	27 July 2002	Brisbane Cricket Ground, Brisbane	38–27	Australia	2002 Tri Nations Series
49	17 August 2002	Ellis Park Stadium, Johannesburg	33–31	South Africa	2002 Tri Nations Series
50	12 July 2003	Newlands Stadium, Cape Town	26–22	South Africa	2003 Tri Nations Series
51	2 August 2003	Lang Park, Brisbane	29–9	Australia	2003 Tri Nations Series
52	31 July 2004	Subiaco Oval, Perth	30–26	Australia	2004 Tri Nations Series
53	21 August 2004	Kings Park Stadium, Durban	23–19	South Africa	2004 Tri Nations Series
54	9 July 2005	Stadium Australia, Sydney	30–12	Australia	2005 Summer International
55	23 July 2005	Ellis Park Stadium, Johannesburg	33–20	South Africa	2005 Summer International
56	30 July 2005	Loftus Versfeld Stadium, Pretoria	22–16	South Africa	2005 Tri Nations Series
57	20 August 2005	Subiaco Oval, Perth	19–22	South Africa	2005 Tri Nations Series
58	15 July 2006	Lang Park, Brisbane	49–0	Australia	2006 Tri Nations Series
59	5 August 2006	Stadium Australia, Sydney	20–18	Australia	2006 Tri Nations Series
60	9 September 2006	Ellis Park Stadium, Johannesburg	24–16	South Africa	2006 Tri Nations Series
61	16 June 2007	Newlands Stadium, Cape Town	22–19	South Africa	2007 Tri Nations Series
62	7 July 2007	Stadium Australia, Sydney	25–17	Australia	2007 Tri Nations Series
63	19 July 2008	Subiaco Oval, Perth	16–9	Australia	2008 Tri Nations Series
64	23 August 2008	Kings Park Stadium, Durban	15–27	Australia	2008 Tri Nations Series
65	30 August 2008	Ellis Park Stadium, Johannesburg	53–8	South Africa	2008 Tri Nations Series
66	8 August 2009	Newlands Stadium, Cape Town	29–17	South Africa	2009 Tri Nations Series
67	29 August 2009	Subiaco Oval, Perth	25–32	South Africa	2009 Tri Nations Series
68	5 September 2009	Lang Park, Brisbane	21–6	Australia	2009 Tri Nations Series
69	24 July 2010	Lang Park, Brisbane	30–13	Australia	2010 Tri Nations Series
70	28 August 2010	Loftus Versfeld Stadium, Pretoria	44–31	South Africa	2010 Tri Nations Series
71	4 September 2010	Free State Stadium, Bloemfontein	39–41	Australia	2010 Tri Nations Series
72	23 July 2011	Stadium Australia, Sydney	39–20	Australia	2011 Tri Nations Series
73	13 August 2011	Kings Park Stadium, Durban	9–14	Australia	2011 Tri Nations Series
74	9 October 2011	Wellington Regional Stadium, Wellington (New Zealand)	9–11	Australia	2011 Rugby World Cup
75	8 September 2012	Subiaco Oval, Perth	26–19	Australia	2012 Rugby Championship
76	29 September 2012	Loftus Versfeld Stadium, Pretoria	31–8	South Africa	2012 Rugby Championship
77	7 September 2013	Lang Park, Brisbane	12–38	South Africa	2013 Rugby Championship
78	28 September 2013	Newlands Stadium, Cape Town	28–8	South Africa	2013 Rugby Championship
79	6 September 2014	Subiaco Oval, Perth	24–23	Australia	2014 Rugby Championship
80	27 September 2014	Newlands Stadium, Cape Town	28–10	South Africa	2014 Rugby Championship
81	18 July 2015	Lang Park, Brisbane	24–20	Australia	2015 Rugby Championship
82	10 September 2016	Lang Park, Brisbane	23–17	Australia	2016 Rugby Championship
83	1 October 2016	Loftus Versfeld Stadium, Pretoria	18–10	South Africa	2016 Rugby Championship
84	9 September 2017	Perth Oval, Perth	23–23	draw	2017 Rugby Championship
85	30 September 2017	Free State Stadium, Bloemfontein	27–27	draw	2017 Rugby Championship
86	8 September 2018	Lang Park, Brisbane	23–18	Australia	2018 Rugby Championship
87	29 September 2018	Nelson Mandela Bay Stadium, Port Elizabeth	23–12	South Africa	2018 Rugby Championship
88	20 July 2019	Ellis Park Stadium, Johannesburg	35–17	South Africa	2019 Rugby Championship
89	11 September 2021	Robina Stadium, Gold Coast (Note: Match was relocated from the Sydney Cricket Ground, Sydney. Despite the match venue being located in Australia, South Africa was nominally the home team.)	26–28	Australia	2021 Rugby Championship
90	18 September 2021	Lang Park, Brisbane	30–17	Australia	2021 Rugby Championship
91	27 August 2022	Adelaide Oval, Adelaide	25–17	Australia	2022 Rugby Championship
92	3 September 2022	Sydney Football Stadium, Sydney	8–24	South Africa	2022 Rugby Championship
93	8 July 2023	Loftus Versfeld Stadium, Pretoria	43–12	South Africa	2023 Rugby Championship
94	10 August 2024	Lang Park, Brisbane	7–33	South Africa	2024 Rugby Championship
95	17 August 2024	Perth Stadium, Perth	12–30	South Africa	2024 Rugby Championship
96	16 August 2025	Ellis Park Stadium, Johannesburg	22–38	Australia	2025 Rugby Championship
97	23 August 2025	Cape Town Stadium, Cape Town	30–22	South Africa	2025 Rugby Championship
98	27 September 2026	Perth Stadium, Perth	42–38	Australia	2026 Spring International

== XV results ==
Below is a list of matches that Australia has retrospectively awarded matches test match status by virtue of awarding caps, but South Africa did not award caps.

Date	Venue	Score	Winner	Competition
2 July 1921	University Oval, Sydney	9–28	South Africa XV	1921 South Africa tour of Australia and New Zealand
27 June 1921	Royal Agricultural Showground, Sydney	11–16	South Africa XV	1921 South Africa tour of Australia and New Zealand
25 June 1921	Royal Agricultural Showground, Sydney	10–25	South Africa XV	1921 South Africa tour of Australia and New Zealand

== List of series ==
Played	Won by Australia	Won by South Africa	Drawn
10	2	7	1

Year	Australia	South Africa	Series winner
1933	2	3	South Africa
1937	0	2	South Africa
1953	1	3	South Africa
1956	0	2	South Africa
1961	0	2	South Africa
1963	2	2	draw
1965	2	0	Australia
1969	0	4	South Africa
1971	0	3	South Africa
1993	2	1	Australia

== See also ==
- Mandela Challenge Plate
