= 2011 Tri Nations Series =

- Date: 23 July 2011– 27 August 2011

Final positions
- Champions: Australia (3rd title)
- Bledisloe Cup: New Zealand
- Freedom Cup: New Zealand
- Mandela Challenge Plate: Australia

Tournament statistics
- Matches played: 6
- Tries scored: 26 (4.33 per match)
- Attendance: 278,981 (46,497 per match)
- Top scorer(s): (New Zealand) Dan Carter (35)
- Most tries: (Australia) Digby Ioane (New Zealand) Ma'a Nonu (New Zealand) Cory Jane (New Zealand) Zac Guildford (South Africa) John Smit (2 tries)

The 2011 Tri Nations Series was the sixteenth annual Tri Nations rugby union series between the national rugby union teams of New Zealand, Australia and South Africa, respectively nicknamed the All Blacks, Wallabies and Springboks. It was also the last series in which only these three teams participated. In 2012, Argentina's Pumas joined this competition, which was rebranded as The Rugby Championship. This made this series the last under the Tri Nations name until 2020, when South Africa withdrew due to the COVID-19 pandemic.

The 2011 Rugby World Cup was held in New Zealand between 9 September and 23 October 2011. As a result, the 2011 Tri Nations was shortened to include only six games instead of the usual nine. Each team played the other two countries twice rather than three times. Australia won the series for the first time in ten years.

== Standings ==
Place	Nation	Games				Points			Bonus points		Table points
Place	Nation	Played	Won	Drawn	Lost	For	Against	Difference	Tries	Losing	Table points
1	Australia	4	3	0	1	92	79	+13	1	0	13
2	New Zealand	4	2	0	2	95	64	+31	1	1	10
3	South Africa	4	1	0	3	54	98	−44	0	1	5

== Fixtures ==
All times are local

=== Round 1 ===
23 July 2011
20:05 AEST (UTC+10)

(1 BP) Australia	39–20	South Africa
Try: Alexander 9' c Ioane 11' m O'Connor 43' c Moore 46' c Ashley-Cooper 54' c Con: O'Connor (4/5); Pen: O'Connor (2/2) 37', 50'	Report	Try: Ralepelle 58' c Smit 75' c Con: Lambie (2/2); Pen: M. Steyn (2/2) 30', 40'

ANZ Stadium, Sydney
Attendance: 52,718
Referee: Chris Pollock (New Zealand)

FB	15	Kurtley Beale	(substituted off) 70'
RW	14	James O'Connor
OC	13	Adam Ashley-Cooper	(substituted off) 63'
IC	12	Pat McCabe
LW	11	Digby Ioane
FH	10	Quade Cooper
SH	9	Will Genia	(substituted off) 64'
N8	8	Ben McCalman
OF	7	David Pocock	(substituted off) 64'
BF	6	Rocky Elsom (c)	(substituted off) 56'
RL	5	James Horwill	(substituted off) 56'
LL	4	Rob Simmons
TP	3	Ben Alexander
HK	2	Stephen Moore	(substituted off) 60'
LP	1	Sekope Kepu
Substitutes:
HK	16	Saia Fainga'a	(substituted on) 60'
PR	17	Pekahou Cowan	(substituted on) 70'
LK	18	Nathan Sharpe	(substituted on) 56'
FL	19	Matt Hodgson	(substituted on) 64'
FL	20	Scott Higginbotham	(substituted on) 56'
SH	21	Nick Phipps	(substituted on) 64'
CE	22	Anthony Fainga'a	(substituted on) 63'
Coach:
(New Zealand) Robbie Deans

FB	15	Gio Aplon
RW	14	Bjorn Basson
OC	13	Juan de Jongh
IC	12	Wynand Olivier	(substituted off) 66'
LW	11	Lwazi Mvovo
FH	10	Morné Steyn	(substituted off) 56'
SH	9	Ruan Pienaar
N8	8	Ashley Johnson	(substituted off) 51'
BF	7	Danie Rossouw
OF	6	Deon Stegmann
RL	5	Alistair Hargreaves
LL	4	Flip van der Merwe				(substituted off) 33'
TP	3	Werner Kruger					(substituted off) 60'
HK	2	John Smit (c)
LP	1	Dean Greyling	6' to 15'		23' to 33'		(substituted off) 58'
Substitutes:
HK	16	Chiliboy Ralepelle					(substituted on) 58'
PR	17	CJ van der Linde	(substituted on) 6'	(substituted off) 15'	(substituted on) 23'	(substituted off) 33'	(substituted on) 60'
N8	18	Ryan Kankowski				(substituted on) 33'
SH	19	Charl McLeod
FL	20	Jean Deysel	(substituted on) 51'
CE	21	Adrian Jacobs	(substituted on) 66'
FH	22	Patrick Lambie	(substituted on) 56'
Coach:
(South Africa) Peter de Villiers

Touch judges:
Keith Brown (New Zealand)
Vinny Munro (New Zealand)
Television match official:
Matt Goddard (Australia)

=== Round 2 ===
30 July 2011
19:35 NZST (UTC+12)

(1 BP) New Zealand	40–7	South Africa
Try: Crockett 13' m Guildford (2) 14' m, 64' m Jane (2) 32' m, 45' c Slade 70' c Con: Carter (2/6); Pen: Carter (2/2) 2', 49'	Report	Try: Smit 29' c Con: M. Steyn (1/1)

Westpac Stadium, Wellington
Attendance: 28,895
Referee: Alain Rolland (Ireland)

FB	15	Mils Muliaina
RW	14	Cory Jane
OC	13	Conrad Smith	(substituted off) 53'
IC	12	Ma'a Nonu	(substituted off) 66'
LW	11	Zac Guildford
FH	10	Dan Carter
SH	9	Jimmy Cowan	(substituted off) 56'
N8	8	Adam Thomson
OF	7	Richie McCaw (c)
BF	6	Jerome Kaino	(substituted off) 56'
RL	5	Ali Williams
LL	4	Sam Whitelock	(substituted off) 72'
TP	3	Ben Franks	(substituted off) 42'	(substituted on) 49'
HK	2	Andrew Hore	(substituted off) 72'
LP	1	Wyatt Crockett
Substitutes:
HK	16	Corey Flynn	(substituted on) 72'
PR	17	John Afoa	(substituted on) 42'	(substituted off) 49'
LK	18	Jarrad Hoeata	(substituted on) 72'
N8	19	Liam Messam	(substituted on) 56'
SH	20	Piri Weepu	(substituted on) 56'
FH	21	Colin Slade	(substituted on) 66'
CE	22	Sonny Bill Williams	(substituted on) 53'
Coach:
(New Zealand) Graham Henry

FB	15	Morné Steyn	(substituted off) 66'
RW	14	Bjorn Basson	(substituted off) 66'
OC	13	Adi Jacobs	(substituted off) 67'
IC	12	Juan de Jongh
LW	11	Lwazi Mvovo
FH	10	Patrick Lambie
SH	9	Ruan Pienaar
N8	8	Danie Rossouw
OF	7	Jean Deysel	(substituted off) 48'
BF	6	Deon Stegmann
RL	5	Alistair Hargreaves
LL	4	Gerhard Mostert	(substituted off) 74'
TP	3	Werner Kruger	(substituted off) 47'
HK	2	John Smit (c)
LP	1	Dean Greyling	(substituted off) 47'
Substitutes:
HK	16	Chiliboy Ralepelle	(substituted on) 47'
PR	17	CJ van der Linde	(substituted on) 47'
N8	18	Ryan Kankowski	(substituted on) 74'
N8	19	Ashley Johnson	(substituted on) 48'
SH	20	Charl McLeod	(substituted on) 66'
CE	21	Wynand Olivier	(substituted on) 67'
WG	22	Odwa Ndungane	(substituted on) 66'
Coach:
(South Africa) Peter de Villiers

Touch judges:
Stuart Dickinson (Australia)
James Leckie (Australia)
Television match official:
Garratt Williamson (New Zealand)

- Dan Carter reclaimed the career lead in test points from Jonny Wilkinson of England with his first penalty, ending the evening with 1,204 career points.

=== Round 3 ===
6 August 2011
19:35 NZST (UTC+12)

New Zealand	30–14	Australia
Try: Nonu 8' c Mealamu 27' c Sivivatu 54' c Con: Carter (3/3); Pen: Carter (2/2) 6', 68'; Drop: Carter (1/1) 47'	Report	Try: Ioane 51' c Elsom 76' c Con: Cooper (2/2)

Eden Park, Auckland
Attendance: 52,182
Referee: Craig Joubert (South Africa)

FB	15	Mils Muliaina
RW	14	Sitiveni Sivivatu	(substituted off) 56'
OC	13	Conrad Smith
IC	12	Ma'a Nonu	(substituted off) 69'
LW	11	Hosea Gear
FH	10	Dan Carter
SH	9	Piri Weepu	(substituted off) 60'
N8	8	Kieran Read
OF	7	Richie McCaw (c)
BF	6	Jerome Kaino	(substituted off) 71'
RL	5	Ali Williams	(substituted off) 65'
LL	4	Brad Thorn
TP	3	Owen Franks
HK	2	Keven Mealamu	(substituted off) 60'
LP	1	Wyatt Crockett	(substituted off) 50'
Substitutes:
HK	16	Andrew Hore	(substituted on) 60'
PR	17	Ben Franks	(substituted on) 50'
LK	18	Sam Whitelock	(substituted on) 65'
FL	19	Adam Thomson	(substituted on) 71'
SH	20	Andy Ellis	(substituted on) 60'
FH	21	Colin Slade	(substituted on) 56'
CE	22	Sonny Bill Williams	(substituted on) 69'
Coach:
(New Zealand) Graham Henry

FB	15	Kurtley Beale
RW	14	James O'Connor
OC	13	Adam Ashley-Cooper
IC	12	Pat McCabe
LW	11	Digby Ioane
FH	10	Quade Cooper
SH	9	Will Genia
N8	8	Ben McCalman	(substituted off) 56'
OF	7	David Pocock
BF	6	Rocky Elsom (c)
RL	5	James Horwill
LL	4	Rob Simmons	(substituted off) 54'
TP	3	Ben Alexander
HK	2	Stephen Moore	(substituted off) 69'
LP	1	Sekope Kepu
Substitutes:
HK	16	Saia Fainga'a	(substituted on) 69'
PR	17	Pekahou Cowan
LK	18	Dan Vickerman	(substituted on) 54'
FL	19	Scott Higginbotham	(substituted on) 56'
SH	20	Luke Burgess
CE	21	Anthony Fainga'a
WG	22	Lachie Turner
Coach:
(New Zealand) Robbie Deans

Touch judges:
Marius Jonker (South Africa)
Christie du Preez (South Africa)
Television match official:
Glen Jackson (New Zealand)

=== Round 4 ===
13 August 2011
17:00 SAST (UTC+02)

(1 BP) South Africa	9–14	Australia
Pen: F. Steyn (1/1) 3'; James (2/3) 16', 58'	Report	Try: Pat McCabe 48' m Pen: O'Connor (3/4) 42', 66', 74'

Mr Price Kings Park, Durban
Attendance: 47,850
Referee: Bryce Lawrence (New Zealand)

FB	15	François Steyn	(substituted off) 51'
RW	14	JP Pietersen
OC	13	Jaque Fourie
IC	12	Jean de Villiers
LW	11	Bryan Habana	(substituted off) 59'	(substituted on) 70'
FH	10	Butch James	(substituted off) 68'
SH	9	Fourie du Preez
N8	8	Pierre Spies
BF	7	Danie Rossouw
OF	6	Heinrich Brüssow	(substituted off) 51'
RL	5	Victor Matfield
LL	4	Bakkies Botha	(substituted off) 64'
TP	3	Jannie du Plessis	(substituted off) 51'	(substituted on) 78'
HK	2	John Smit (c)		(substituted off) 78'
LP	1	Tendai Mtawarira	(substituted off) 68'
Substitutes:
HK	16	Bismarck du Plessis	(substituted on) 51'
PR	17	Gurthrö Steenkamp	(substituted on) 68'
LK	18	Gerhard Mostert	(substituted on) 64'
FL	19	Jean Deysel	(substituted on) 51'
SH	20	Francois Hougaard	(substituted on) 59'	(substituted off) 70'
FH	21	Morné Steyn	(substituted on) 68'
WG	22	Gio Aplon	(substituted on) 51'
Coach:
(South Africa) Peter de Villiers

FB	15	Kurtley Beale
RW	14	James O'Connor
OC	13	Pat McCabe
IC	12	Adam Ashley-Cooper	(substituted off) 60'
LW	11	Digby Ioane
FH	10	Quade Cooper
SH	9	Will Genia
N8	8	Scott Higginbotham	(substituted off) 60'
OF	7	David Pocock
BF	6	Rocky Elsom (c)
RL	5	James Horwill
LL	4	Nathan Sharpe
TP	3	Ben Alexander
HK	2	Stephen Moore
LP	1	Sekope Kepu
Substitutes:
HK	16	Saia Fainga'a
PR	17	Salesi Ma'afu
LK	18	Sitaleki Timani
N8	19	Ben McCalman
N8	20	Radike Samo	(substituted on) 60'
SH	21	Luke Burgess
CE	22	Anthony Fainga'a	(substituted on) 60'
Coach:
(New Zealand) Robbie Deans

Touch judges:
George Clancy (Ireland)
Carlo Damasco (Italy)
Television match official:
Shaun Veldsman (South Africa)

- South Africa's starting XV had a total of 810 caps going into the match, an all-time record for the sport.

=== Round 5 ===
20 August 2011
17:00 SAST (UTC+02)

South Africa	18–5	New Zealand
Pen: M. Steyn (5/5) 8', 10', 18' 27', 60'; Drop: M. Steyn (1/2) 32'	Report	Try: Kahui 35' m

Nelson Mandela Bay Stadium, Port Elizabeth*
Attendance: 45,478
Referee: George Clancy (Ireland)

FB	15	Patrick Lambie	(substituted off) 21'
RW	14	JP Pietersen
OC	13	Jaque Fourie
IC	12	Jean de Villiers
LW	11	Bryan Habana
FH	10	Morné Steyn
SH	9	Fourie du Preez
N8	8	Pierre Spies
BF	7	Willem Alberts			(substituted off) 69'
OF	6	Heinrich Brüssow	(substituted off) 13'	(substituted on) 27'
RL	5	Victor Matfield (c)
LL	4	Bakkies Botha	(substituted off) 48'	(substituted on) 58'	(substituted off) 68'
TP	3	Jannie du Plessis	(substituted off) 70'
HK	2	Bismarck du Plessis	(substituted off) 61'
LP	1	Gurthrö Steenkamp	(substituted off) 42'
Substitutes:
HK	16	John Smit	(substituted on) 61'
PR	17	Tendai Mtawarira	(substituted on) 42'
PR	18	CJ van der Linde	(substituted on) 70'
FL	19	Danie Rossouw	(substituted on) 48'	(substituted off) 58'	(substituted on) 68'
N8	20	Ashley Johnson	(substituted on) 13'	(substituted off) 27'	(substituted on) 69'
SH	21	Francois Hougaard	(substituted on) 21'
FH	22	Butch James
Coach:
(South Africa) Peter de Villiers

FB	15	Israel Dagg
RW	14	Isaia Toeava
OC	13	Richard Kahui
IC	12	Sonny Bill Williams
LW	11	Hosea Gear	(substituted off) 73'
FH	10	Colin Slade	(substituted off) 62'
SH	9	Jimmy Cowan	(substituted off) 54'
N8	8	Liam Messam	(substituted off) 71'
OF	7	Adam Thomson
BF	6	Jerome Kaino
RL	5	Ali Williams	(substituted off) 70'
LL	4	Sam Whitelock
TP	3	John Afoa	(substituted off) 51'	(substituted on) 61'
HK	2	Keven Mealamu (c)	(substituted off) 61'
LP	1	Tony Woodcock		(substituted off) 61'
Substitutes:
HK	16	Andrew Hore	(substituted on) 61'
PR	17	Ben Franks	(substituted on) 51'
LK	18	Jarrad Hoeata	(substituted on) 70'
FL	19	Victor Vito	(substituted on) 71'
SH	20	Andy Ellis	(substituted on) 54'
SH	21	Piri Weepu	(substituted on) 62'
WG	22	Cory Jane	(substituted on) 73'
Coach:
(New Zealand) Graham Henry

Touch judges:
Andrew Small (England)
Carlo Damasco (Italy)
Television match official:
Johann Meuwesen (South Africa)

- This was the first time that a Tri Nations test was played in Port Elizabeth.

Source: Fox Sports AllBlacks.com

=== Round 6 ===
27 August 2011
20:05 AEST (UTC+10)

Australia	25–20	New Zealand (1 BP)
Try: Genia 13' c Samo 33' c Beale 60' m Con: Cooper (2/3) 14', 34'; Pen: Cooper (2/3)	Report	Try: Smith 52' c Nonu 58' c Con: Carter (2/2) 53', 59'; Pen: Carter (2/2) 23', 46'

Suncorp Stadium, Brisbane
Attendance: 51,858
Referee: Wayne Barnes (England)

FB	15	Kurtley Beale
RW	14	Adam Ashley-Cooper
OC	13	Pat McCabe
IC	12	Anthony Fainga'a
LW	11	Digby Ioane
FH	10	Quade Cooper
SH	9	Will Genia (c)
N8	8	Radike Samo	(substituted off) 61'
OF	7	David Pocock
BF	6	Rocky Elsom	(substituted off) 72'
RL	5	James Horwill
LL	4	Dan Vickerman	(substituted off) 54'
TP	3	Ben Alexander
HK	2	Stephen Moore	(substituted off) 76'
LP	1	Sekope Kepu	(substituted off) 76'
Substitutes:
HK	16	Saia Fainga'a	(substituted on) 76'
PR	17	Salesi Ma'afu	(substituted on) 76'
LK	18	Rob Simmons	(substituted on) 54'
N8	19	Ben McCalman	(substituted on) 61'
FL	20	Scott Higginbotham	(substituted on) 72'
SH	21	Luke Burgess	(substituted on) 76'
CE	22	Rob Horne
Coach:
(New Zealand) Robbie Deans

FB	15	Mils Muliaina
RW	14	Cory Jane
OC	13	Conrad Smith
IC	12	Ma'a Nonu
LW	11	Zac Guildford	(substituted off) 54'
FH	10	Dan Carter
SH	9	Piri Weepu	(substituted off) 64'
N8	8	Kieran Read	(substituted off) 13'
OF	7	Richie McCaw (c)
BF	6	Adam Thomson	(substituted off) 38'
RL	5	Sam Whitelock
LL	4	Brad Thorn
TP	3	Owen Franks	(substituted off) 75'
HK	2	Keven Mealamu	(substituted off) 75'
LP	1	Tony Woodcock
Substitutes:
HK	16	Andrew Hore	(substituted on) 75'
PR	17	John Afoa	(substituted on) 75'
LK	18	Ali Williams	(substituted on) 38'
FL	19	Victor Vito	(substituted on) 13'
SH	20	Andy Ellis	(substituted on) 64'
FH	21	Colin Slade
WG	22	Isaia Toeava	(substituted on) 54'
Coach:
(New Zealand) Graham Henry

Touch judges:
Craig Joubert (South Africa)
Cobus Wessels (South Africa)
Television match official:
Matt Goddard (Australia)

== Player statistics ==
=== Leading try scorers ===
Top try scorers
Rank	Name	Team	Tries
1	John Smit	South Africa	2
1	Cory Jane	New Zealand	2
1	Zac Guildford	New Zealand	2
1	Digby Ioane	Australia	2
1	Ma'a Nonu	New Zealand	2

=== Leading point scorers ===
Top point scorers
Rank	Name	Team	Points
1	Dan Carter	New Zealand	35
2	James O'Connor	Australia	28
3	Morné Steyn	South Africa	26
4	Quade Cooper	Australia	14
5	John Smit	South Africa	10
5	Zac Guildford	New Zealand	10
5	Cory Jane	New Zealand	10
5	Digby Ioane	Australia	10
5	Ma'a Nonu	New Zealand	10
10	Butch James	South Africa	6

== See also ==
- History of rugby union matches between Australia and South Africa
- History of rugby union matches between Australia and New Zealand
- History of rugby union matches between New Zealand and South Africa
