= Pat McCabe (rugby union) =

Australia international rugby union player

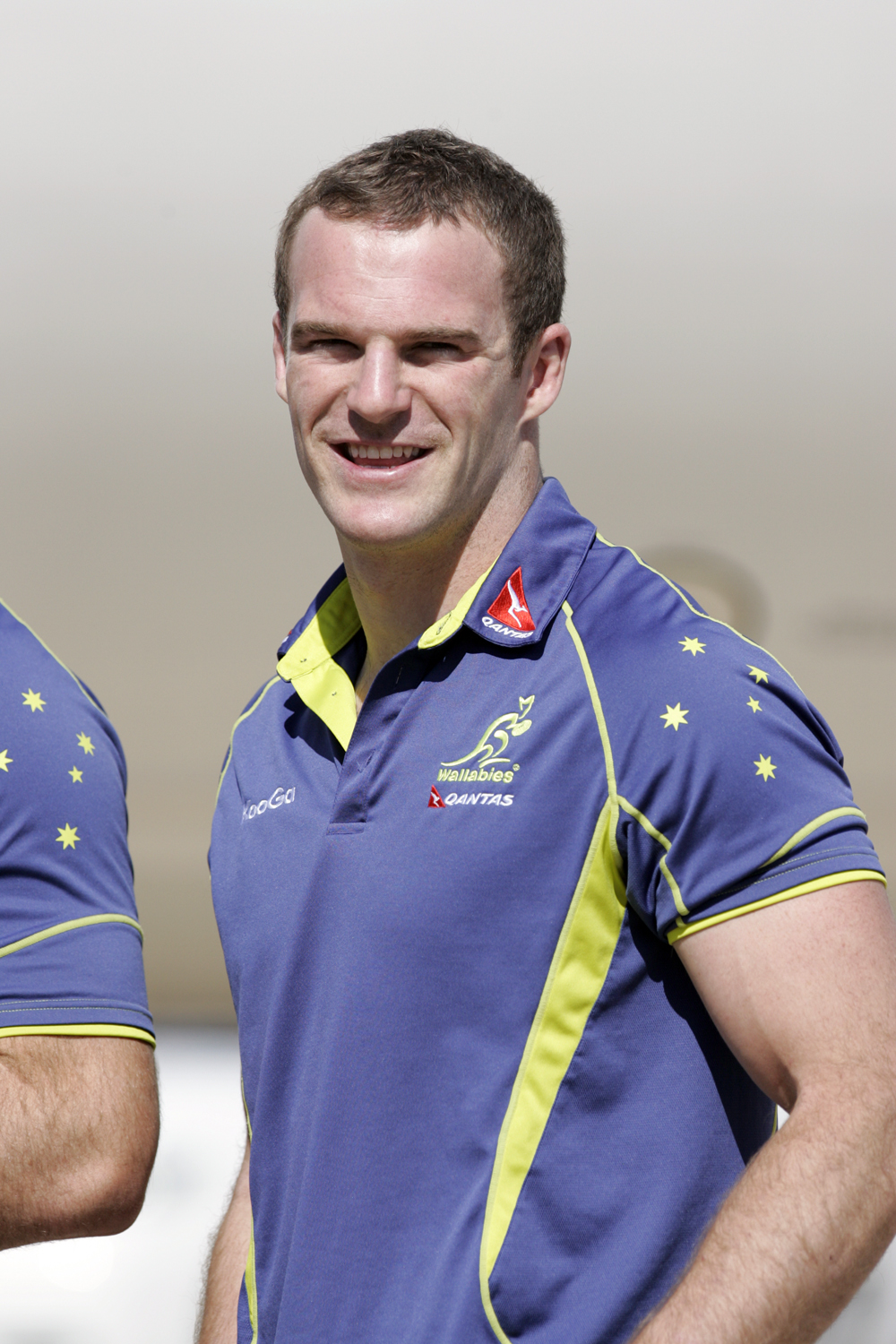
- Pat McCabe in October 2012
- Born: Patrick Joseph McCabe; 21 March 1988 (age 38) Manly, Sydney
- Height: 186 cm (6 ft 1 in)
- Weight: 92 kg (203 lb)
- School: St Aloysius' College
- University: Macquarie University
- Occupation: Lawyer

Rugby union career
- Position: Inside Centre / Wing / Fullback
Senior career
Years	Team	Apps	(Points)
2007	Central Coast Rays	3	(5)
2014	Canberra Vikings	0	(0)
Super Rugby
Years	Team	Apps	(Points)
2010–2014	Brumbies	66	(50)
- Correct as of 27 July 2014
International career
Years	Team	Apps	(Points)
2010–2014	Australia	24	(25)
- Correct as of 24 August 2014
Medal record
Men's rugby union
Representing Australia
Rugby World Cup
Bronze medal – third place	2011 New Zealand	Squad

Patrick McCabe (born 21 March 1988) is a former professional Australian rugby union player, now practising lawyer. He played for the Brumbies in the Super Rugby, and Warringah in Sydney, and represented Australia at various age grade levels before a senior debut in 2010. He was a utility player, able to cover inside centre, outside centre, winger or fullback.

== Early life and education ==
McCabe was born and raised on Sydney's Northern Beaches. He started playing rugby as a teenager at St Aloysius' College in Sydney and represented the Australian Schoolboys with Quade Cooper, Kurtley Beale, Will Genia and David Pocock. He studied business/law at Macquarie University.

== Rugby career ==
=== Early years ===
McCabe first started out professionally with the New South Wales Waratahs academy in 2006, where he participated on a development tour of England and Ireland. In 2007, he was selected for the Australian U19's team for the 2007 Under 19 Rugby World Championship. He helped the team's 3rd place in the Championship, after beating Wales 36–14 on 21 April 2007. His eye-catching displays for Australia in the Under-19's, earned himself selection for the Central Coast Rays in the inaugural and final season of the Australian Rugby Championship. He helped the team to a Grand Final victory, beating Melbourne Rebels 20–12.

=== 2009–10 ===
In 2009, he was selected for the Brumbies academy squad, and after impressing on a development tour to France in mid 2009, where he was the Brumbies 'Player of the Tour', he signed a full contract with the franchise for the 2010 Super 14 season. In his debut season, he played every minute of every game that season, the only Brumby to do this, making his Super 14 debut against the Western Force on 12 February during Round 1, where he established himself on the right wing (#14). After just 4 rounds he got a talk up from his coach Andy Friend basically just saying that he was carving it and had the ability to play for the Wallabies. Having been selected for the Australian Sevens team for the 2010 Commonwealth Games, McCabe was forced to put on hold his Wallabies dream. However, he withdrew from the Sevens team due to injury.

McCabe was first selected for the Australia national team for the 2010 Tri Nations Series – though he did not have any game time during the tournament. He was re-selected for the Wallabies for the 2010 tour of Europe; including test matches against Wales, England, Italy and France, plus additional uncapped matches against Leicester Tigers and Munster. He made his first appearance for the Wallabies against the Leicester Tigers, playing at Outside Centre, reappearing in the same position against Munster. However, his first test cap came against Italy, as a late substitute for Adam Ashley-Cooper at the Stadio Artemio Franchi, Florence.

=== 2011–12 ===
In 2011, the new 15-team format began, and McCabe continued his great form into the 2011 season. He started in 13 matches in that season, scoring just 3 tries. His impressive form for the Brumbies earned McCabe a call-up to the Wallabies squad for the match against Samoa. This was McCabe's first start in the Wallabies jersey, however the match is heavily remembered as Samoa's first ever victory over the Wallabies, winning 32–23 at the ANZ Stadium. Despite this, he went on to play every match of the 2011 Tri Nations Series, helping the Wallabies secure just their third Tri-nations title.

McCabe was part of the 2011 Rugby World Cup squad in New Zealand, where he made his World Cup debut against Italy playing at Inside Centre, in a 32–5 victory at North Harbour Stadium. He became a consistent starter under Head-Coach Robbie Deans and featured in the same position in his second and third games versus Ireland and the United States respectively. But an injury sustained the USA match, force McCabe to withdraw from the squad and was not expected to take any further part in the World Cup. But despite damaging his shoulder, McCabe returned just two weeks later as one of the key figures of Australia’s epic 11–9 shut-out of the defending champions South Africa in the tournament quarter-final.

Under the new leadership of Jake White, McCabe started every match of the 2012 Super Rugby season. He helped the team secure seventh in the Overall Standings with 58 points, narrowly behind the sixth Sharks with 59 points. His skills on field and leadership off the field, saw McCabe became a new member of the Wallabies Test-team leadership group, along with another new member, Rebels centre James O'Connor. The groups' other three members are: Will Genia, James Horwill, and David Pocock. The group meets with Wallabies coaching and managerial staff to discuss team strategy, planning and off-field logistics. He began this role during the 2012 Rugby Championship, where he played in just 3 matches out of the possible 6. He continued on with this role during the 2012 European tour, where he suffered a premature end to the year, due to a cervical fracture in his neck, sustained during the opening Test of the Spring Tour against France in Paris.

=== 2013–14 ===
Despite his neck injury in late 2012, and numerous suggestions of retirement, McCabe was determined to recover and continue on with playing rugby. He returned to professional rugby on 5 April, during Round 8 of the 2013 Super Rugby season. He then played the next six matches in hope of being selected for the Wallabies squad that would face the British and Irish Lions. On 10 June, McCabe was named in the 31-man squad, and on 20 June he was named on the bench for the first test at Suncorp Stadium. He made his appearance just 1 minute into the game, when starting inside centre Christian Lealiifano was replaced due to a heavy collision with Lions centre Jonathan Davies. Though, McCabe was only on the pitch for 45 minutes, when he reinjured the same part of his neck that he did in 2012, a end of year injury.

Through the injury, McCabe was unable to take part in the 2013 Super Rugby Final between the Brumbies and Chiefs - that match was won by the Chiefs 27–22.

McCabe returned to rugby on 22 February 2014, round 2 of the 2014 Super Rugby season. He played in 17 out of 18 matches that season, helping the team to an Australian derby semi-final against the eventual champions New South Wales Waratahs. His form throughout the 2014 Super Rugby Season, saw McCabe selected for the first time by coach Ewen McKenzie, where he played twice of the bench during the French Test Series. He was then reselected for the 2014 Rugby Championship, playing on the wing (#14) in the opening two rounds against the All Blacks. However, during the second round, he was replaced at the 62-minute, following a third neck injury that he picked up in 2012 and 2013.

Then on 28 August, McCabe confirmed his retirement saying "it wasn't a particularly hard decision" after suffering a third neck fracture in less than two years.

== Post rugby career ==
In December 2016, Pat McCabe was admitted as a lawyer in the ACT. He works at law firm MinterEllison.

== Honours ==
Representative Honours

- Australian Schoolboys – 2005
- Australia Under-19's – 2007
- Australian Sevens team – 2010

Trophies/Honors

- Mandela Challenge Plate
  - Winners: 2010, 2011, 2012
- Puma Trophy
  - Winners: 2012
- James Bevan Trophy
  - Winners: 2012
- Trophée des Bicentenaires
  - Winners: 2014
