= The Rugby Championship =

International rugby union competition

- Current season or competition: 2025 Rugby Championship
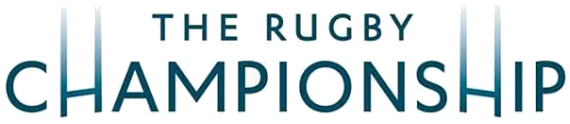
- Sport: Rugby union
- Formerly known as: Tri Nations Series (1996–2011)
- Inaugural season: 1996
- Number of teams: 4
- Countries: Argentina; Australia; New Zealand; South Africa
- Holders: South Africa (2025)
- Most titles: New Zealand (20)
- Website: super.rugby
- Broadcast partner: See full broadcasting rights: Nine Network; Stan (Australia); ESPN; Disney+ (Latin America); Sky Sport (New Zealand); SuperSport (South Africa)

The Rugby Championship, formerly known as the Tri Nations Series (1996–2011), (Note: In 2020, with the tournament being hosted in Australia following COVID-19 pandemic issues, South Africa had withdrawn. The tournament continued with the remaining three teams (Argentina, Australia, New Zealand) as the "Tri-Nations Series".) is an international rugby union competition contested by Argentina, Australia, New Zealand, and South Africa. These are traditionally the four highest-ranked national teams in the Southern Hemisphere.

The competition is administered by SANZAAR, a consortium consisting of four national governing bodies: the South African Rugby Union (SARU), New Zealand Rugby (NZR), Rugby Australia (RA) and the Argentine Rugby Union (UAR). The inaugural Tri Nations Series tournament was in 1996, and was won by New Zealand. South Africa won their first title in 1998, and Australia their first in 2000. Following the last Tri Nations Series tournament in 2011, New Zealand had won ten championships, with South Africa and Australia on three titles each. The first Rugby Championship was won by New Zealand, who won all six of their matches.

== History ==
=== Foundation ===
Australia and New Zealand first played each other in 1903. South Africa toured both nations in 1921 but there was never any formal competition between these teams, unlike the Home Nations (now known as the Six Nations Championship) in the Northern Hemisphere and the three nations only met sporadically.

In the 1930s, Australia and New Zealand started contesting the Bledisloe Cup during rugby tours between the two countries.

The final acceptance of professionalism in rugby union launched the Tri Nations concept, nearing the completion of the 1995 Rugby World Cup, multimillion-pound negotiations between the South African, New Zealand and Australian unions took place to form SANZAR. The new union soon announced a ten-year deal worth £360 million. The competition was established to create an equivalent to the Five Nations in Europe.

In 2012, this competition was extended to include Argentina, a country whose impressive performances in international games (especially in reaching the third place in the 2007 Rugby World Cup) was deemed to merit inclusion in the competition. As a result of the expansion to four teams, the tournament was renamed the Rugby Championship.

Tri Nations Series logo

=== Tri Nations Series ===
The opening tournament of 1996 was dominated by the All Blacks who stormed to victory undefeated, leaving the Springboks and the Wallabies with just one win each — against each other. The opening exchange was between New Zealand and Australia, New Zealand winning by over 40 points and, although they won all four of their games, the later matches were a lot closer in their scorelines. The launch of the Tri Nations was considered a huge success.

A similar story unfolded the following year, 1997. The All Blacks maintained their dominance over the new competition and again went undefeated. Australia and South Africa found themselves in similar position again with just one win each. The 1998 series was something of a turnaround for all nations with South Africa winning the tournament and Australia finishing second. Two-time winner New Zealand finished at the bottom with no wins. In the following tournament in 1999 New Zealand again became Tri Nations champions and defending champions South Africa fell to the bottom.

Australia, the World Champions at the time, won their first Tri Nations championship in 2000. That tournament is also notable for Australia's opening match against New Zealand at Stadium Australia where 109,874 spectators attended. Jonah Lomu scored a try in injury time to grab the win for the All Blacks. The game was hailed as one of the greatest ever, and the end competition thought by some to be the best Tri Nations ever at the time.

Australia continued their reign as Tri Nations champions by successfully defending the trophy the following year. Their run ended in 2002 when the All Blacks won the championship again. New Zealand successfully defended it in 2003. South Africa won the 2004 tournament where the three nations finished with two wins each. The Springboks emerged as winners due to their superior table points. The trophy returned to New Zealand in 2005 and the Wallabies failed to win a game. In 2006 New Zealand retained the trophy with 2 games still to be played. In 2007, the Tri Nations was shortened to two games against either team, because it clashed with the Rugby World Cup in France. The Tri Nations championship and the Bledisloe Cup came down to the final match, between New Zealand and Australia at Eden Park. New Zealand ran out easy winners, and lifted both the trophies. There was some controversy as South Africa fielded less than a full strength squad in the away legs in Australia and New Zealand in anticipation of the World Cup. New Zealand defended their title in 2008, in beating Australia in the final match in Brisbane. In 2009, South Africa claimed the season crown in their final match with an away win over New Zealand in Hamilton. 2010 saw another dominant performance by New Zealand, winning the tournament with 2 games to spare and all 6 of their games.

On 5 December 2020, a traditional version of the Australian National Anthem was sung for the first time in the Eora indigenous language, before the match between Argentina and Australia.

=== Expansion ===
The competition was expanded in 2006 and saw each of the three nations play each other three times, although the 2007 series reverted to a double round-robin to reduce fixture congestion in a World Cup year. Historically there were persistent rumours about the inclusion of Argentina and this was formalised on 14 September 2009 when it was announced that Argentina would become part of the competition in 2012. There have also been rumours about a Pacific Islands team being included too.

Until then, Argentina was the only tier 1 nation that had no regular competition, and some, among them former Pumas captain Agustín Pichot, had even spoken of them joining the Six Nations. However, a spokesperson said: "We belong in a tournament in the southern hemisphere and not in an expanded Six Nations". The inclusion of Argentina did have some support from some bodies, South African Rugby Union deputy chief executive saying: "We would support (their) request to play in the Tri-Nations". Former Springbok coach Jake White also said: "I think it would add a new dimension to the tournament and perhaps refresh it."

Since 2007 a deal between the International Rugby Board (IRB), the world governing body for the sport, was brokering a deal with SANZAR to admit Argentina to the Tri Nations as early as 2008 The Sunday Times reported that many players and fans in the SANZAR countries disliked the expansion to a triple round-robin, noting that former All Blacks scrum-half Justin Marshall accused SANZAR of overkill in 2006. Also, the piece added that South Africa is highly dissatisfied with the current Tri Nations format, as it requires that the Boks tour for a month while the Wallabies and All Blacks fly in and out of South Africa in a week. The addition of Argentina would even out travel commitments for all teams involved. The Sunday Times noted that there were two main stumbling blocks to adding Argentina:

- Division of broadcast revenue, which is currently shared equally by the four SANZAAR countries.
- At the time, the biggest stumbling block was possibly the Argentine Rugby Union (UAR). The Times noted that some UAR members were "deeply attached to amateurism", adding that the IRB had a blueprint on the table for a South American provincial competition similar to SANZAR's Super Rugby, featuring six Argentine provincial sides and one each from Uruguay and Chile, but UAR had yet to approve it.

However, by August 2007, it became clear that there would be no expansion of the series before the current television contract between SANZAR and News Corporation expires in 2010. An IRB spokesman stated that the main problems with adding the Pumas to the Tri Nations, besides media contracts, were fixture congestion and the lack of a professional structure in Argentina. Domestic rugby in Argentina is still amateur; in fact, the UAR constitution specifically prohibited professional rugby in the country until December 2007, and even did not allow for a professional league. Because of this, a large majority of the Pumas play for European club teams, which would likely create further scheduling conflicts. Admission of Argentina was therefore submitted to several conditions for the UAR:

- Ensure its best players would be available at the Tri-nations time of year, late winter (in the Southern Hemisphere), which is exactly when France's Top 14 and England's Premiership start their first games.
- Develop professional rugby inside Argentina thanks to a SANZAR loan and financial support from the IRB; Professionalisation has since entered Argentina.
- Reform competitions into a single united professional league. There are now regional leagues being the one from Buenos Aires city the strongest and a short 4-team clubs national championship.

In November 2007, the IRB held a conference on the future worldwide growth of the sport, with the status of Los Pumas a key topic of discussion. The most important decision made at the conference, with regard to the Tri Nations, was the agreement of the UAR to establish a professional rugby structure between 2008 and 2012, at which time Argentina would be "fully integrated into the Southern top-flight Rugby playing structure." At the time of the IRB conference, the UAR had already scheduled a special meeting for 28 December 2007 to amend its constitution to allow players to be paid. Shortly after the IRB conference, New Zealand Rugby Union deputy chief executive Steve Tew expressed doubts that, within ten years, a professional domestic competition in Argentina would be sufficiently viable to retain elite players in South America despite all the good intentions and funding of the IRB. The aforementioned UAR meeting did not result in the formation of a professional league. The 23 provincial delegates voted unanimously to keep their domestic league amateur, but approved a plan to centrally contract the Pumas selection pool to the UAR as professionals. In February 2009, the UAR announced that under a plan supervised and financed by the IRB, it had contracted 31 local players, who will each receive 2,300 Argentine pesos (US$655/£452) per month. The eventual goal is for these players to form the core of a future Pumas selection pool.

Argentina officially joined the Rugby Championship in a meeting in Buenos Aires on 23 November 2011.

Japan have been in talks to join the competition since at least 2021. They previously played in the Asia Rugby Championship (ARC), for which they dominated; winning the competition 25 times in 30 editions. Fiji have also been mentioned as another potential candidate to join the competition. Potential expansion to Fiji took a significant step following the 2023 Rugby World Cup. Head Coach Simon Raiwalui confirmed in October 2023 that there were ongoing discussions of Fiji entering the Rugby Championship, and cited the need of results, rankings and administrative structures for admission into the competition.

=== Cycle change (2026–2030) ===
Beginning in 2023, discussions of a New Zealand/South Africa reciprocal tour had been ongoing between the South African Rugby Union (SARU) and New Zealand Rugby (NZR). This reigniting of a tour between two of the three traditional Southern Hemisphere rugby nations would be a first since the creation of the Tri Nations Series in 1996. In February 2024 it was reported that both unions were in "advanced talks" of a return to the traditional tours, and by September the same year the Daily Maverick reported that formal agreements had been made for the tours to go ahead for 2026, complicating the Rugby Championship structure. With this revelation, The Sydney Morning Herald at the time understood that the annual format of the competition was unlikely to be played again until 2029, with alleged plans in place for tours involving all four SANZAAR nations in 2028. The publication added that because of this change, it would mean a shortened Rugby Championship in 2027, before a full tournament in 2029, with no tournaments for 2026 or 2028. However, in mid-October 2025, The Sydney Morning Herald reported that due to late lobbying from Rugby Australia (RA) CEO Phil Waugh at a SANZAAR meeting in London, the tournament would remain unchanged for 2027, 2028, and 2029. The 2026 tour, which would feature New Zealand playing seven matches in South Africa, including four tests (one at a neutral venue), was officially confirmed by the SARU and NZR in October 2025. This meant the Rugby Championship would not be played for 2026 or 2030, but would remain unchanged from its usual format for 2027, 2028, and 2029.

The former vice chairman of World Rugby and Argentina scrum-half, Agustín Pichot, called the SARU and NZR selfish for their decision, and stated that the New Zealand/South Africa tours would have a negative impact on Australia and Argentina. In November 2025, Rugby Australia announced its 2026 international schedule and confirmed a two-test tour of Argentina.

== Competition and format ==
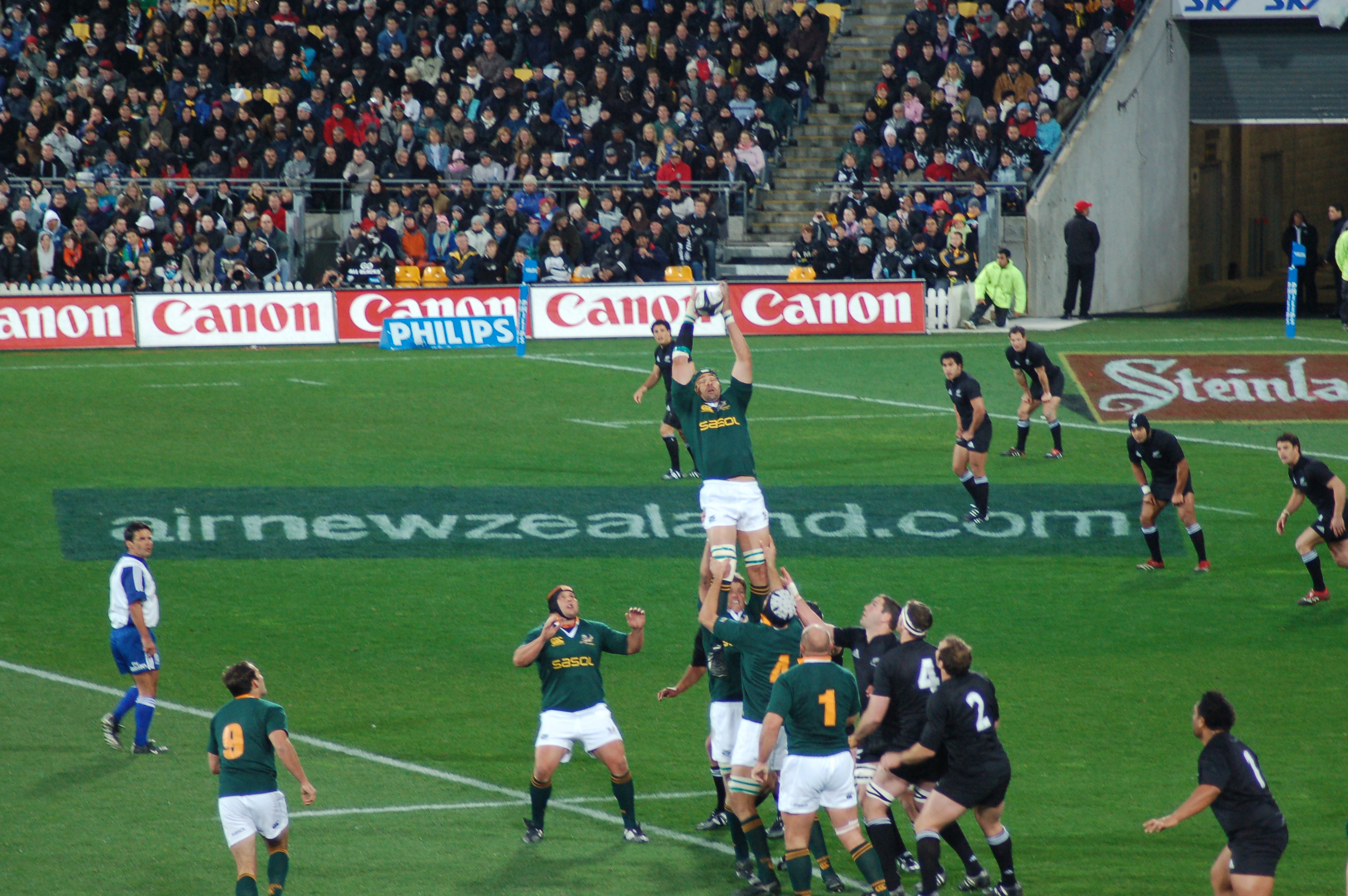
A South African line-out against New Zealand in 2006

The order of fixtures has changed several times in the history of the competition. In previous iterations, each team played each other twice. After some tweaking of the schedule it was decided to start the series with two fixtures in either South Africa or New Zealand and move the series to the country that did not host the opening rounds. Under this setup Australia's home fixtures were always the middle two in the series. In 2006 the format was re-worked. This was the result of a new television deal between SANZAR and broadcasters in SANZAR countries and the United Kingdom. Each team played the other three times. The series opened in New Zealand and the first four rounds alternated between New Zealand and Australia. The fifth round was in Australia. After a one-week break the series returned to New Zealand and then finished with South Africa's three home fixtures. Each team had two home fixtures against one team and only one home fixture against the other.

The competition between 2006 and 2011 began in early July. Originally it had started late in July but, with the expansion of the series, the start date has moved to early in the month before finishing in early September. Beginning in the inaugural season of the Rugby Championship, the competition began in August and finished in October, with the exception of shortened editions in Rugby World Cup (RWC) years (2015, 2019, 2023).

=== Bonus points ===
The winner is determined by a points system:

- 4 points for a win
- 2 points for a draw
- 0 points for a loss

"Bonus points" may also be earned in any given match and count toward deciding the series winner. A total of two bonus points can be possibly scored:

- The Try Bonus Point. Between 1996 and 2015, scoring four tries in a match was the threshold to secure a bonus point. In 2016 SANZAAR implemented the net-try bonus point: a bonus point for finishing three or more tries ahead of the opponent. This new system was adopted from the Super Rugby, which had implemented it ahead of their 2016 season.
- The Defending bonus point by losing by seven points (a converted try) or fewer.

A victorious team can collect either 4 or 5 points, depending on whether or not it gained an attacking bonus point. A team that draws can collect either 2 or 3 points, depending on whether or not it gained an attacking bonus point. A losing team may collect from 0 to 2 points. At the end of the series the team with the most points is declared the winner.

If teams end level on points for any position, the first tiebreaker is total number of wins in the competition, then number of wins against the other team/s tied on points, then overall points differential, then points differential between the team/s tied on points, then most tries scored in the competition. If that can't differentiate the team, the series or position will be shared.

=== Trophies ===
While every team in the Rugby Championship is competing for the Championship trophy, there are also several trophies held between the teams that are also contested during the competition. Australia contests three trophies, the most of all the teams in the competition; while New Zealand and South Africa both contest two trophies each. Argentina, the newest member of the tournament, contests just one trophy with Australia (Puma Trophy), which was established prior to their invitation into the Rugby Championship.

Trophy	Established	Teams	Notes
Bledisloe Cup	1931; 95 years ago	Australia–New Zealand	Named after the Governor-General of New Zealand Lord Bledisloe, the trophy has been contested between Australia and New Zealand since 1931; it is the largest trophy in rugby union sitting a metre tall.
Puma Trophy	2000; 26 years ago	Argentina–Australia	Contested between Argentina and Australia, the Puma Trophy was first introduced in 2000.
Mandela Challenge Plate	2000; 26 years ago	Australia–South Africa	Named after the first post-apartheid President of South Africa Nelson Mandela, the Mandela Challenge Plate was created to commemorate the long-held traditional relationship between Australia and South Africa. It was first contested between the two teams in a one-off test in 2000.
Freedom Cup	2004; 22 years ago	New Zealand–South Africa	Introduced in 2004 to mark South Africa's "Ten Years of Democracy", the Freedom Cup is contested between New Zealand and South Africa. It was first played for in a one-off test in the 2004 Tri Nations Series.

=== Mini-tours ===
In June 2022, SANZAAR confirmed the introduction of a revised scheduling format for the Rugby Championship, to be implemented from the 2022 tournament through to the 2025 edition. Under this new model, known as mini-tours, each participating nation hosts one opposing team for both of their fixtures in a given tournament, replacing the previous structure in which teams faced every opponent once at home and once away. This format revived a decades-long practice between the traditional SANZAAR nations (Australia, New Zealand, South Africa) of touring one another which had not taken place since before the inaugural tournament in 1996.

Despite the tournament not taking place for 2026, the mini-tour format was confirmed to continue in the 2027 edition.

== Results ==
=== Tri-Nations Series (1996–2011; 2020) ===
Year	Champions	Bledisloe Cup	Mandela Challenge Plate	Freedom Cup	Puma Trophy	Wooden Spoon
1996	New Zealand	New Zealand	Not contested	Not contested	Not contested	Australia
1997	New Zealand	New Zealand	Not contested	Not contested	Not contested	Australia
1998	South Africa	Australia	Not contested	Not contested	Not contested	New Zealand
1999	New Zealand	Australia	Not contested	Not contested	Not contested	South Africa
2000	Australia	Australia	Not contested	Not contested	Not contested	South Africa
2001	Australia	Australia	Not contested	Not contested	Not contested	South Africa
2002	New Zealand	Australia	South Africa	Not contested	Not contested	South Africa
2003	New Zealand	New Zealand	Not contested	Not contested	Not contested	South Africa
2004	South Africa	New Zealand	Not contested	South Africa	Not contested	New Zealand
2005	New Zealand	New Zealand	South Africa	Not contested	Not contested	Australia
2006	New Zealand	New Zealand	Australia	New Zealand	Not contested	South Africa
2007	New Zealand	New Zealand	Australia	New Zealand	Not contested	South Africa
2008	New Zealand	New Zealand	Australia	New Zealand	Not contested	South Africa
2009	South Africa	New Zealand	South Africa	South Africa	Not contested	Australia
2010	New Zealand	New Zealand	Australia	New Zealand	Not contested	South Africa
2011	Australia	New Zealand	Australia	New Zealand	Not contested	South Africa
2020	New Zealand	New Zealand	Not contested	Not contested	Australia	Australia

=== The Rugby Championship (2012–2019; 2021–present) ===
Year	Champions	Bledisloe Cup	Mandela Challenge Plate	Freedom Cup	Puma Trophy	Wooden Spoon
2012	New Zealand	New Zealand	Australia	New Zealand	Australia	Argentina
2013	New Zealand	New Zealand	South Africa	New Zealand	Australia	Argentina
2014	New Zealand	New Zealand	South Africa	New Zealand	Australia	Argentina
2015	Australia	New Zealand	Australia	New Zealand	Australia	South Africa
2016	New Zealand	New Zealand	Australia	New Zealand	Australia	Argentina
2017	New Zealand	New Zealand	Australia	New Zealand	Australia	Argentina
2018	New Zealand	New Zealand	Australia	New Zealand	Australia	Argentina
2019	South Africa	New Zealand	South Africa	New Zealand	Australia	Argentina
2021	New Zealand	New Zealand	Australia	New Zealand	Australia	Argentina
2022	New Zealand	New Zealand	Australia	New Zealand	Australia	Argentina
2023	New Zealand	New Zealand	South Africa	New Zealand	Argentina	Australia
2024	South Africa	New Zealand	South Africa	South Africa	Argentina	Australia
2025	South Africa	New Zealand	South Africa	South Africa	Argentina	Argentina
2027	TBD					

=== Overall titles (since 1996) ===
Team	Wins	Bledisloe Cup	Mandela Challenge Plate	Freedom Cup	Puma Trophy	Wooden Spoon
New Zealand	20	25	—N/a	16	—N/a	2
South Africa	6	—N/a	9	4	—N/a	11
Australia	4	5	13	—N/a	13	7
Argentina	0	—N/a	—N/a	—N/a	3	10

=== Tournament history ===
Ed.	Year	Champion (gold)	Runner-up (silver)	Third (bronze)	Fourth
1	1996	New Zealand	South Africa	Australia	—N/a
2	1997	New Zealand	South Africa	Australia	—N/a
3	1998	South Africa	Australia	New Zealand	—N/a
4	1999	New Zealand	Australia	South Africa	—N/a
5	2000	Australia	New Zealand	South Africa	—N/a
6	2001	Australia	New Zealand	South Africa	—N/a
7	2002	New Zealand	Australia	South Africa	—N/a
8	2003	New Zealand	Australia	South Africa	—N/a
9	2004	South Africa	Australia	New Zealand	—N/a
10	2005	New Zealand	South Africa	Australia	—N/a
11	2006	New Zealand	Australia	South Africa	—N/a
12	2007	New Zealand	Australia	South Africa	—N/a
13	2008	New Zealand	Australia	South Africa	—N/a
14	2009	South Africa	New Zealand	Australia	—N/a
15	2010	New Zealand	Australia	South Africa	—N/a
16	2011	Australia	New Zealand	South Africa	—N/a
17	2012	New Zealand	Australia	South Africa	Argentina
18	2013	New Zealand	South Africa	Australia	Argentina
19	2014	New Zealand	South Africa	Australia	Argentina
20	2015	Australia	New Zealand	Argentina	South Africa
21	2016	New Zealand	Australia	South Africa	Argentina
22	2017	New Zealand	Australia	South Africa	Argentina
23	2018	New Zealand	South Africa	Australia	Argentina
24	2019	South Africa	Australia	New Zealand	Argentina
25	2020	New Zealand	Argentina	Australia	—N/a
26	2021	New Zealand	Australia	South Africa	Argentina
27	2022	New Zealand	South Africa	Australia	Argentina
28	2023	New Zealand	South Africa	Argentina	Australia
29	2024	South Africa	New Zealand	Argentina	Australia
30	2025	South Africa	New Zealand	Australia	Argentina
31	2027	TBD			

Tri Nations Series (1996–2011; 2020)
Nation	Matches				Points			Bonus points	Table points	Titles won
Nation	P	W	D	L	PF	PA	PD	Bonus points	Table points	Titles won
New Zealand	76	52	0	24	2,054	1,449	+605	35	243	11
Australia	76	30	3	43	1,591	1,817	−226	34	160	3
South Africa	72	28	1	43	1,480	1,831	−351	24	138	3
Argentina	4	1	2	1	56	84	–28	0	8	0

Source: lassen.co.nz – Tri-Nations, Australia, New Zealand, South Africa

Bonus points given by T – 4W − 2D, for T table points, W games won and D games drawn.

Rugby Championship (since 2012)
Nation	Matches				Points			Bonus points	Table points	Titles won
Nation	P	W	D	L	PF	PA	PD	Bonus points	Table points	Titles won
New Zealand	69	55	2	12	2,313	1,348	+965	43	268	9
South Africa	69	37	4	28	1,845	1,534	+311	33	185	3
Australia	69	28	3	38	1,563	1,900	−337	16	141	1
Argentina	69	14	1	54	1,358	2,277	−919	16	66	0

Updated: 4 October 2025
Source: lassen.co.nz – TRC, Argentina, Australia, New Zealand, South Africa
Bonus points given by T – 4W − 2D, for T table points, W games won and D games drawn.

All-time Tri Nations Series and Rugby Championship Table (since 1996)
Nation	Matches				Points			Bonus points	Table points	Titles won
Nation	P	W	D	L	PF	PA	PD	Bonus points	Table points	Titles won
New Zealand	145	107	2	36	4,367	2,797	+1,570	78	511	20
South Africa	141	65	5	71	3,325	3,365	–40	57	323	6
Australia	145	58	6	81	3,154	3,717	–563	50	301	4
Argentina	73	15	3	55	1,414	2,361	–947	16	74	0

Updated: 4 October 2025
Bonus points given by T – 4W − 2D, for T table points, W games won and D games drawn.

== Attendance ==
=== Tri Nations Series ===
Year	Avg. attendance	High	Low
1996	41,423	51,000 (RSA vs NZL)	38,000 (NZL vs RSA), (RSA vs AUS)
1997	54,559	90,119 (AUS vs NZL)	36,000 (AUS vs RSA)
1998	49,283	75,127 (AUS vs NZL)	35,683 (NZL vs AUS)
1999	54,369	107,042 (AUS vs NZL)	31,667 (AUS vs RSA)
2000	63,609	109,874 (AUS vs NZL)	36,500 (NZL vs AUS)
2001	52,393	90,978 (AUS vs NZL)	36,000 (NZL vs AUS)
2002	51,127	79,543 (AUS vs NZL)	36,500 (NZL vs AUS)
2003	51,194	82,096 (AUS vs NZL)	30,200 (NZL vs RSA)
2004	52,172	83,418 (AUS vs NZL)	34,000 (NZL vs RSA)
2005	50,509	83,000 (AUS vs NZL)	29,500 (NZL vs RSA)
2006	45,211	60,522 (AUS vs RSA)	25,428 (RSA vs NZL)
2007	51,833	79,322 (AUS vs NZL)	33,708 (NZL vs RSA)
2008	49,412	78,944 (AUS vs NZL)	32,210 (NZL vs RSA)
2009	44,344	80,228 (AUS vs NZL)	31,000 (NZL vs RSA)
2010	49,111	94,713 (RSA vs NZL)	25,000^{1} (NZL vs RSA)
2011	46,497	52,718 (AUS vs RSA)	28,895 (NZL vs RSA)
2020	17,101^{2}	36,000 (AUS vs NZL)	9,063 (NZL vs ARG)

^1Full capacity at Eden Park was not available as the stadium underwent renovations to expand for the forthcoming 2011 Rugby World Cup.
^2The 2020 Tournament, held entirely in Australia, was played with maximum 50% stadium capacity allowance due to the impact of the COVID-19 pandemic. The tournament was played as a Tri Nations series for the first time since 2011, as South Africa were unable to participate.

=== Rugby Championship ===
Year	Avg. attendance	High	Low
2012	45,627	80,753 (RSA vs NZL)	22,278 (ARG vs AUS)
2013	40,676	68,765 (NZL vs AUS)	18,214 (ARG vs AUS)
2014	35,882	68,627 (NZL vs AUS)	14,281 (ARG vs AUS)
2015	40,569	73,824 (NZL vs AUS)	17,512 (ARG vs NZL)
2016	35,940	65,328 (NZL vs AUS)	16,202 (ARG vs AUS)
2017	30,610	54,846 (NZL vs AUS)	14,229 (ARG vs AUS)
2018	36,138	66,318 (NZL vs AUS)	16,019 (ARG vs AUS)
2019	38,795	61,241 (AUS vs NZL)	29,190 (RSA vs ARG)
2021	22,943	52,724 (AUS vs NZL)	0^{3} (RSA vs ARG), (ARG vs RSA)
2022	38,642	61,519 (RSA vs NZL)	20,000 (NZL vs ARG)
2023	46,383	83,944 (AUS vs NZL)	28,000 (AUS vs ARG)
2024	44,132	68,061 (AUS vs NZL)	25,000 (NZL vs ARG), (ARG vs RSA)
2025	48,424	70,360 (ARG vs RSA)	20,163 (AUS vs ARG)

^3The two matches between South Africa and Argentina were both played in empty stadiums in South Africa, as crowds were not allowed to attend due to the ongoing effects of the COVID-19 pandemic.

== Top scorers ==
The following sections contain points and tries which have been scored in the Rugby Championship.

=== Top points scorers ===
Rank	Player	Team	Points
1	Dan Carter	New Zealand	554
2	Morné Steyn	South Africa	390
3	Beauden Barrett	New Zealand	347
4	Nicolás Sánchez	Argentina	346
5	Andrew Mehrtens	New Zealand	328
6	Handré Pollard	South Africa	302
7	Matt Burke	Australia	271
8	Matt Giteau	Australia	266
9	Bernard Foley	Australia	249
10	Percy Montgomery	South Africa	210

Updated: 27 September 2025
Source: espnscrum.com

=== Top try scorers ===
Rank	Player	Team	Tries
1	Bryan Habana	South Africa	21
2	Beauden Barrett	New Zealand	20
3	Rieko Ioane	New Zealand	19
4	Ben Smith	New Zealand	18
5	Malcolm Marx	South Africa	17
5	Richie McCaw	New Zealand	17
7	Christian Cullen	New Zealand	16
8	Joe Rokocoko	New Zealand	15
9	Israel Folau	Australia	14
9	Will Jordan	New Zealand	14

Updated: 4 October 2025
Source: espnscrum.com

== U20 Rugby Championship ==
U20 Rugby Championship
- Current season or competition: 2026 U20 Rugby Championship
- Sport: Rugby union
- Instituted: July 2023; 3 years ago (Note: Announced by SANZAAR in July 2023, with the first edition taking place in May 2024.)
- Inaugural season: 2024
- Country: Argentina; Australia; New Zealand; South Africa
- Holders: South Africa (2026)
- Most titles: New Zealand (2)
- Related competition: U20 Six Nations Championship; World Rugby U20 Championship

The U20 Rugby Championship is the youth edition of the competition the Rugby Championship, played between the teams that make up SANZAAR (South Africa, New Zealand, Australia, Argentina)

In July 2023 it was announced that the first edition of the youth competition of the Rugby Championship would be played, starting in April 2024, hosted on the Gold Coast, Queensland, Australia. While Australia and New Zealand competed annually in the Oceania Rugby Under 20 Championship outside of the World Rugby U20 Championship, Argentina and South Africa did not compete in any organised international competition within their own region. Similar to the senior competition, the team that finished in first-place at the end of three rounds will be declared the champions.

=== Tournament history ===
Ed.	Year	Host	Champion (gold)	Runner-up (silver)	Third (bronze)	Fourth
1	2024	Australia	New Zealand	South Africa	Argentina	Australia
2	2025	South Africa	New Zealand	Australia	South Africa	Argentina
3	2026	South Africa	South Africa	New Zealand	Argentina	Australia

== Broadcasting rights ==
In Australia, the Rugby Championship is broadcast on the Nine Network and Stan. Nine airs Wallabies matches free-to-air while Stan broadcasts all matches. The competition was formerly broadcast by Fox Sports until 2020. Sky Sport airs the competition in New Zealand. Setanta Sports broadcast live matches of the Rugby Championship in Asia. Sky Sports shows all games live in the UK and Ireland, while ESPN holds the rights in the Americas, airing matches in Argentina on ESPN Latin America and in North America on its WatchESPN streaming service.

== See also ==
- History of rugby union matches between Argentina and Australia
- History of rugby union matches between Argentina and New Zealand
- History of rugby union matches between Argentina and South Africa
- History of rugby union matches between Australia and New Zealand
- History of rugby union matches between Australia and South Africa
- History of rugby union matches between New Zealand and South Africa
- Rugby union trophies and awards
- Six Nations Championship, an analogous tournament of national teams in the Northern Hemisphere
