= Gerhard Mostert =

South African rugby union player

- Born: Gerhard Mostert; October 4, 1984 (age 42) Rustenburg, South Africa
- Height: 1.99 m (6 ft 6 1/2 in)
- Weight: 120 kg (265 lb)
- University: North-West University

Rugby union career
- Position: Lock
Senior career
Years	Team	Apps	(Points)
2011–2018	Stade Français	94	(5)
- Correct as of 31 January 2015
Provincial / State sides
Years	Team	Apps	(Points)
2006	Leopards	4	(0)
2007–2009	Golden Lions	11	(0)
2010–2011	Sharks (Currie Cup)	7	(0)
Super Rugby
Years	Team	Apps	(Points)
2006–2009	Lions	26	(0)
2010–2011	Sharks	10	(0)
International career
Years	Team	Apps	(Points)
2011–present	South Africa	2	(0)
- Correct as of 12 December 2011

Gerhard Mostert is a professional rugby union player who played for Stade Français in the Top 14. He was schooled at Die Hoërskool Rustenburg.

Mostert made his provisional debut for the Sharks in 2010, and played for the Sharks against the Chiefs in the 2010 Super 14 season. Mostert had previously played for the Golden Lions. In October 2010, Gerhard was selected to the Springboks squad of 39 players to prepare for the November tour of Europe. He eventually made his Springbok debut during the 2011 Tri Nations Series as injury cover for Johann Muller, in a 40-7 loss against the All Blacks in Wellington. Although it was a miserable day for the team, Mostert, impressed Springbok Coach Peter de Villiers who decided to include Mostert in his 24-man squad for the home tests.

Gerhard Mostert was named on the bench for the third test against the Wallabies in Durban on 30 July 2011. Mostert made his second appearance in the green and gold off the bench for Bakkies Botha.
