= Cédric Soulette =

France international rugby union player

Cédric Soulette (born 30 May 1972) is a French rugby union footballer. He currently plays for the AS Béziers club. In the past, he also played for Toulouse and ASM Clermont Auvergne. His usual position is as a prop. He has also played for the French national team and was a part of their 1998 Grand Slam team. He was also involved in the IRB Rugby Aid Match. Whilst at Toulouse he was a replacement as they won the 2003 Heineken Cup.
