= Tom Gleeson (rugby union) =

Irish rugby union player

- Born: Thomas Gleeson; 26 September 1985 (age 41) Bishopstown, Ireland
- Height: 1.85 m (6 ft 1 in)
- Weight: 98 kg (15.4 st; 216 lb)

Rugby union career
- Position: Centre
Senior career
Years	Team	Apps	(Points)
2006–2012	Munster	19	(5)
- Correct as of 31 December 2011
International career
Years	Team	Apps	(Points)
2006	Ireland U21	3	(0)
- Correct as of 19 April 2021
National sevens team
Years	Team		Comps
2009	Ireland		1

Tom Gleeson (born 26 September 1985) is a former Irish rugby union player and doctor. He played as a centre.

== Munster & retirement ==
He made his Munster debut against Border Reivers in September 2006. His first try for Munster came against Connacht in December 2010. Gleeson left Munster at the end of the 2011–12 season. Gleeson has since become a doctor in Ireland.
