= Fletcher Dyson =

- Full name: Fletcher John Dyson
- Born: 27 May 1973 (age 53) Melbourne, Australia
- Height: 6 ft 0 in (183 cm)
- Weight: 255 lb (116 kg)

Rugby union career
- Position: Prop
Senior career
Years	Team	Apps	(Points)
1999	NSW Waratahs	8	
2000–03	Queensland Reds	51	
International career
Years	Team	Apps	(Points)
2000	Australia	10	(0)

Fletcher John Dyson (born 27 May 1973) is an Australian former professional rugby union player.

Dyson, born in Melbourne, was educated at Brisbane's John Paul College and played for the Australia national under-19 rugby union team. He made his Super 12 debut for New South Wales in 1999 after spending several seasons in the Shute Shield. In 2000, Dyson moved to the Queensland Reds and immediately caught the attention of Australian selectors, featuring in 10 Test matches that year for the Wallabies as a prop. This included all four matches in Australia's Tri Nations title win. His career was ended by a serious neck injury in 2004.

== See also ==
- List of Australia national rugby union players
