= Joe Roff =

Australian rugby union player (born 1975)

- Born: Joseph Ward Roff; 20 September 1975 (age 51) Heathcote, Victoria, Australia
- Height: 192 cm (6 ft 4 in)
- Weight: 100 kg (15 st 10 lb; 220 lb)
- School: The Armidale School; Marist College Canberra
- University: University of Southern Queensland; University of Oxford

Rugby union career
- Position(s): Wing, Fullback
Amateur team(s)
Years	Team	Apps	(Points)
- Tuggeranong Vikings
Senior career
Years	Team	Apps	(Points)
2001–2002	Biarritz Olympique		
2005–2006	Kubota Spears	9	(24)
- Correct as of 29 January 2006
Provincial / State sides
Years	Team	Apps	(Points)
1994–2004	ACT	82	(520)
- Correct as of 22 June 2014
Super Rugby
Years	Team	Apps	(Points)
1996–2004	Brumbies	86	(588)
- Correct as of 22 June 2014
International career
Years	Team	Apps	(Points)
1992–1993	Australian Schoolboys	2	(0)
1995–2004	Australia	86	(249)
- Correct as of 22 June 2014

Joseph Ward Roff (born 20 September 1975) is an Australian former professional rugby union footballer who played on the wing or at fullback for ACT Brumbies and Australia. He also had a spell at the French club Biarritz and in 2005–06 at Kubota Spears in Japan's Top League Of his 86 caps, 62 were won in consecutive games from 1996 to 2001. His final game saw him captain Oxford against Cambridge in the 2007 Varsity Match.

== Early life ==
Roff was born in Heathcote, central Victoria, Australia in 1975.

Roff's early schooling included a stint a St Lawrence's Infant School Dubbo. For a time, he attended The Armidale School in Armidale, New South Wales. He was also a student at Marist College Canberra, during which time he represented the Australian Schoolboys in 1992 and 1993. Roff's father, Glenn Roff, was Principal of St John's College, Woodlawn.

== Rugby career ==
After a successful junior career he was selected at age 19 for Australia's 1995 Rugby World Cup squad, making his debut against Canada and scoring a try, followed by another 2 against Romania.

By 1996 he was a more regular feature in the starting test side before becoming a firm test player for the 1999 Rugby World Cup win and the back to back Tri Nations wins of 2000 and 2001. He was also a capable goal kicker, kicking 18 penalties and 20 conversions in his test career.

Roff scored the intercept try from Jonny Wilkinson's pass in the second British Lions Test in 2001. This turned the test in Australia's favour before they went on to win the game with Roff scoring a second try, squaring the series at 1-1. They went on to win the series 2–1.

Until March 2007 he was the top try scorer in Super Rugby before he was overtaken by Doug Howlett. He also held the record for most tries in a Super 12 season, scoring 15 in 1997.

Midway through the super 12 season of 2004 he announced that he would retire at the end of the domestic international season. He was just 29 years old and had spent 10 years playing Test rugby and amassed 86 test caps and 244 points. He farewelled the Brumbies in 2004 as the team took the Super 12 Final.

== Education ==
Roff's secondary education was at The Armidale School in Armidale, New South Wales, and Marist College Canberra that has a proud rugby tradition.

Roff was awarded a Bachelor of Applied Finance from the University of Southern Queensland.

=== Oxford University ===
Roff matriculated at the University of Oxford, UK in October 2006 to read Philosophy, Politics, and Economics at Harris Manchester College. He was also involved in the Oxford Union.

He also made a return to amateur rugby by playing for the Oxford University (OURFC), colloquially known as the Dark Blues, representing the Blues in their traditional fixture against Cambridge at Twickenham Stadium on 12 December 2006. Oxford lost this match 15–6. On 6 December 2007, he captained the Blues to their third successive Varsity loss, losing 22–16 to Cambridge, before hanging up his boots for the last time.

== Later career ==
In June 2012, the University of Canberra Union (student body) announced that Roff had been appointed as its CEO with effect from July 2012, noting that Roff was leaving a management position with Lifeline Australia and had previously been a consultant with The Nous Group.

== Other ==
In January 2007, he won the "United Kingdom-based Young Australian of the Year for 2007" for his services to Australian Rugby in general. In 2018, Joe joined Canberra social mixed netball team 'A New Hope'. The team was runner up in the division 3 finals. He was voted Most Valuable Player for the season. During his years with the Wallabies, the rhyming slang term "Joe Roffie" gradually worked its way into the Australian vernacular, being an abbreviation for coffee.
