= Mark Connors =

Australian rugby union footballer

- Born: 17 May 1971 (age 55) Brisbane, Australia
- Height: 6 ft 5 in (1.96 m)
- Weight: 229 lb (104 kg)

Rugby union career
- Position(s): Lock, Flanker
Senior career
Years	Team	Apps	(Points)
2002–04	Northampton Saints	50	(23)
2004	Suntory Sungoliath		
Provincial / State sides
Years	Team	Apps	(Points)
1994–2006	Queensland	134	((?))
Super Rugby
Years	Team	Apps	(Points)
1996–2001	Reds	66	(30)
International career
Years	Team	Apps	(Points)
1999–2000	Australia	20	(10)

Mark Connors (born 17 May 1971, Brisbane) is an Australian former rugby union footballer. He is currently the Queensland Reds third most capped player ever, playing 134 games for the side. He has played for Australia 20 times, including their victory in the 1999 Rugby World Cup.

== Playing career ==
A product of St Laurence's College, South Brisbane, he made his debut for the Queensland Reds against La Plata in a 1994 tour of Argentina. He was part of the Queensland Reds 1995 Super 10 side that won the competition. He made his international debut for Australia on 17 July 1999 in a game against the Springboks in Brisbane, which Australia won 32 points to six. Connors was part of the Wallabies side that won the 1999 Rugby World Cup in Wales. In 2000 the Wallabies won the Tri Nations as well as the Bledisloe Cup. After spending three seasons in both England and Japan, he returned to the Queensland Reds.
