= 1993 South Africa rugby union tour of Australia =

Rugby tour

Summary
P	W	D	L
Total
15	12	0	3
Test match
3	1	0	2
Opponent
P	W	D	L
Australia
3	1	0	2

The 1993 South Africa rugby union tour of Australia was a series of matches played by the Springboks in Australia during July and August 1993. It was the first tour of the South African team to Australia since the riots of the controversial tour of 1971.

The test series was won by the Wallabies with two test wins to one.

== Results ==
Scores and results list South Africa's points tally first.

Opposing team	For	Against	Date	Venue	Status
Western Australia	71	8	14 July 1993	WACA Ground, Perth	Tour match
South Australia Pres. XV	90	3	17 July 1993	Thebarton Oval, Adelaide	Tour match
Victorian Pres. XV	78	3	21 July 1993	Olympic Park, Melbourne	Tour match
New South Wales	28	29	24 July 1993	Waratah Rugby Stadium, Sydney	Tour match
New South Wales Country	41	7	27 July 1993	Wade Park, Orange	Tour match
Australia	19	12	31 July 1993	Sydney Football Stadium, Sydney	Test match
A.C.T. Kookaburras	57	10	4 August 1993	Bruce Stadium, Canberra	Tour match
Queensland	17	3	8 August 1993	Ballymore, Brisbane	Tour match
Queensland Country	63	5	11 August 1993	Quarry Hill, Mackay	Tour match
Australia	20	28	14 August 1993	Ballymore, Brisbane	Test match
Sydney	31	20	17 August 1993	Penrith Park, Sydney	Tour match
Australia	12	19	21 August 1993	Sydney Football Stadium, Sydney	Test match
