= Thinus Delport =

South African ex rugby union player

- Born: Gehardus Martinus Delport; February 2, 1975 (age 51) Port Elizabeth, South Africa
- Height: 6.2 ft (1.9 m)
- Weight: 15.7 st (100 kg)
- School: Linden High School
- University: RAU

Rugby union career
- Position(s): Wing, Fullback
- Current team: retired
Amateur team(s)
Years	Team	Apps	(Points)
- Old Patesian veterans
- Correct as of 13 July 2014
Senior career
Years	Team	Apps	(Points)
2002–2004	Gloucester Rugby	35	(30)
2004–2008	Worcester Warriors	109	(112)
2008–2010	Kobelco Steelers		
- Correct as of 13 July 2014
Provincial / State sides
Years	Team	Apps	(Points)
1997-2001	Golden Lions	63	(210)
2002	Sharks (Currie Cup)	3	(22)
2003	→ Valke (loan)		
- Correct as of 13 July 2014
Super Rugby
Years	Team	Apps	(Points)
1998-2001	Cats	39	(35)
2002	Sharks	4	(5)
- Correct as of 13 July 2014
International career
Years	Team	Apps	(Points)
2000–2003	South Africa	18	(15)
- Correct as of 13 July 2014
Coaching career
- Years: Team
- 2010–2011: Stourbridge
- Correct as of 13 July 2014

Thinus Delport (born 2 February 1975, in Port Elizabeth) is a South African ex rugby union player who played at wing or fullback for Worcester Warriors and South Africa.

He started his career playing for the Lions from U21 level and he made his senior debut in 1997. Playing in the Super 12 for the Lions formerly known as The Cats.

Delport began his English career at Gloucester. Whilst there he started the 2003 Powergen Cup Final in which Gloucester defeated Northampton Saints. Delport joined Worcester from Gloucester in 2004. Delport left Worcester Warriors in 2007 and became a television rugby presenter He made his international debut on the Springboks' 1997 European tour. However, it was three years before he made his test debut against Canada in East London (2000).

Delport also played in the Tsunami Memorial game representing the southern hemisphere alongside some of the world's greatest players.

It was announced in March 2008 that Delport would be moving to Japanese Side Kobelco Steelers at the end of the season, to pursue a new rugby career there.

On 24 June 2010 it was announced Delport had signed a 1-year deal at National 1 outfit Stourbridge as a player coach.

After retirement he has also played an amateur game for the Old Patesian veterans, a local Gloucestershire club, in which they beat their rivals: Smiths Industries, in the third team's cup.

In 2014 Delport became an ambassador for Project Zulu, a UK based charity running the educational development projects in the Madadeni township, KZN, South Africa. In February 2015 he visited the Madadeni township to host their first schools tag rugby tournament.

Delport is also an ambassador and active member of Rugby for Heroes, a UK based charity helping active and retired service men and women make the transition to civilian life, using Rugby as a medium. He works alongside patrons Mike Tindall OBE and Nick Knowles to build up the profile of the charity.
