= Troy Jaques =

Australia international rugby union player (born 1972)

- Born: 11 March 1972 (age 54) Newcastle, Australia
- Height: 6 ft 5 in (196 cm)
- Weight: 242 lb (110 kg)

Rugby union career
- Position: Back-row
Senior career
Years	Team	Apps	(Points)
1997–00	ACT Brumbies		
2000–01	CA Brive		
2001–03	Clermont		
2003–06	Ricoh Black Rams		
International career
Years	Team	Apps	(Points)
2000	Australia	2	(0)

Troy Jaques (born 11 March 1972) is an Australian former professional rugby union player.

Jaques grew up in Tamworth, New South Wales, attending Our Lady of the Rosary College. He completed his schooling at Waverley College in Sydney after receiving a swimming scholarship. An Australian schoolboys representative, Jaques played his early rugby with Eastern Suburbs and Northern Suburbs, before joining the ACT Brumbies.

A back-rower, Jaques was capped twice for Australia in 2000, coming off the bench in Tests against South Africa in Melbourne and New Zealand in Sydney. He left Australian rugby to play professionally in France, where he competed for CA Brive and then Clermont. From 2003 to 2006, Jaques played for the Ricoh Black Rams in Japan.

== See also ==
- List of Australia national rugby union players
