= Mandela Challenge Plate =

International rugby trophy

- Sport: Rugby union
- Instituted: 2000
- Number of teams: 2
- Country: Australia; South Africa
- Holders: Australia (2026)
- Most titles: Australia (14 titles)

The Nelson Mandela Challenge Plate is a rugby union trophy contested between Australia and South Africa. It is named after South Africa's first democratically elected president, Nelson Mandela.

== History ==
Initially designed to be held every two years, the trophy was first contested as a one-off match in 2000, with Australia winning the game 44–23 at Melbourne's Docklands Stadium. The second, played in Ellis Park Stadium, Johannesburg in 2002, was also South Africa's home game in the Tri Nations Series, and was won 33–31 by South Africa. The 2004 event, delayed until 2005, was played over two legs, and was not part of the Tri Nations Series, similar to the inaugural edition. Since South Africa were the holders, Australia needed to win both games to reclaim the trophy. Australia won the first game 30–12, but lost the return leg at Ellis Park Stadium, 33–20.

Between 2006 and 2011, with the expansion of the Tri Nations Series so that each country plays each other three times, the plate was contested over three Tests, akin to the Bledisloe Cup, with the exception of 2007 and 2011, when teams only played 4 games each to accommodate for the Rugby World Cup (RWC) held in those years. In 2012, the Tri Nations Series was expanded to include Argentina and the competition was renamed The Rugby Championship (TRC). The teams now play each other twice, and the challengers are required to beat the holders in both games to win the plate. In 2026, South Africa played a four-Test "Greatest Rivalry" series against New Zealand, so the plate was contested in a single Test, which Australia won 42–38 at Perth Stadium to reclaim the trophy.

The trophy is a leather-clad silver plate containing a 24 carat (100%) rim, and a central gold disk showing a Wallaby and a Springbok (the icons of the two teams). It was designed by Flynn Silver, an Australian family company from Kyneton, Victoria, Australia.

== Matches ==
As of 27 September 2026.

Details	P	Australia	South Africa	D	Australia points	South Africa points
Australia	24	18	5	1	606	493
South Africa	20	4	15	1	350	564
Overall	44	22	20	2	954	1,057

== Results ==
Year	Date	Venue	Home	Score	Away	Trophy Winner
2026	27 September 2026	Perth Stadium, Perth	Australia	42–38	South Africa	Australia
2025	23 August 2025	Cape Town Stadium, Cape Town	South Africa	30–22	Australia	South Africa
2025	16 August 2025	Ellis Park Stadium, Johannesburg	South Africa	22–38	Australia	South Africa
2024	17 August 2024	Perth Stadium, Perth	Australia	12–30	South Africa	South Africa
2024	10 August 2024	Lang Park, Brisbane	Australia	7–33	South Africa	South Africa
2023	8 July	Loftus Versfeld, Pretoria	South Africa	43–12	Australia	South Africa
2022	3 September 2022	Allianz Stadium, Sydney	Australia	8–24	South Africa	Australia
2022	27 August 2022	Adelaide Oval, Adelaide	Australia	25–17	South Africa	Australia
2021	18 September	Suncorp Stadium, Brisbane	Australia	30–17	South Africa	Australia
2021	12 September	Robina Stadium, Robina, Queensland	Australia	28–26	South Africa	Australia
2019	20 July	Ellis Park, Johannesburg	South Africa	35–17	Australia	South Africa
2018	29 September	Nelson Mandela Bay Stadium, Port Elizabeth	South Africa	23–12	Australia	Australia
2018	8 September	Lang Park, Brisbane	Australia	23–18	South Africa	Australia
2017	30 September	Free State Stadium, Blomfontein	South Africa	27–27	Australia	Australia
2017	9 September	Perth Oval, Perth	Australia	23–23	South Africa	Australia
2016	1 October	Loftus Versfeld, Pretoria	South Africa	18–10	Australia	Australia
2016	10 September	Lang Park, Brisbane	Australia	23–17	South Africa	Australia
2015	18 July	Lang Park, Brisbane	Australia	24–20	South Africa	Australia
2014	27 September	Newlands, Cape Town	South Africa	28–10	Australia	South Africa
2014	6 September	Subiaco Oval, Perth	Australia	24–23	South Africa	South Africa
2013	28 September	Newlands, Cape Town	South Africa	28–8	Australia	South Africa
2013	7 September	Lang Park, Brisbane	Australia	12–38	South Africa	South Africa
2012	29 September	Loftus Versfeld, Pretoria	South Africa	31–8	Australia	Australia
2012	8 September	Subiaco Oval, Perth	Australia	26–19	South Africa	Australia
2011	13 August	Kings Park Stadium, Durban	South Africa	9–14	Australia	Australia
2011	23 July	Stadium Australia, Sydney	Australia	39–20	South Africa	Australia
2010	4 September	Free State Stadium, Bloemfontein	South Africa	39–41	Australia	Australia
2010	28 August	Loftus Versfeld, Pretoria	South Africa	44–31	Australia	Australia
2010	24 July	Suncorp Stadium, Brisbane	Australia	30–13	South Africa	Australia
2009	5 September	Lang Park, Brisbane	Australia	21–6	South Africa	South Africa
2009	29 August	Subiaco Oval, Perth	Australia	25–32	South Africa	South Africa
2009	8 August	Newlands, Cape Town	South Africa	29–17	Australia	South Africa
2008	30 August	Ellis Park, Johannesburg	South Africa	53–8	Australia	Australia
2008	23 August	Kings Park Stadium, Durban	South Africa	15–27	Australia	Australia
2008	19 July	Subiaco Oval, Perth	Australia	16–9	South Africa	Australia
2007	7 July	Stadium Australia, Sydney	Australia	25–17	South Africa	Australia
2007	16 June	Newlands, Cape Town	South Africa	22–19	Australia	Australia
2006	9 September	Ellis Park, Johannesburg	South Africa	24–16	Australia	Australia
2006	5 August	Stadium Australia, Sydney	Australia	20–18	South Africa	Australia
2006	15 July	Lang Park, Brisbane	Australia	49–0	South Africa	Australia
2005	23 July	Ellis Park, Johannesburg	South Africa	33–20	Australia	South Africa
2005	9 July	Stadium Australia, Sydney	Australia	30–12	South Africa	South Africa
2002	17 August	Ellis Park, Johannesburg	South Africa	33–31	Australia	South Africa
2000	8 July	Docklands Stadium, Melbourne	Australia	44–23	South Africa	Australia

== See also ==
- History of rugby union matches between Australia and South Africa
