= Charl Marais =

South African rugby union player

- Born: Charl Francois Marais; 2 September 1970 (age 56) Bothaville, Free State
- Height: 1.85 m (6 ft 1 in)
- Weight: 107 kg (236 lb)
- School: Grey College, Bloemfontein

Rugby union career
- Position: Hooker
Senior career
Years	Team	Apps	(Points)
2001–2003	Sale Sharks	33	(5)
Provincial / State sides
Years	Team	Apps	(Points)
1994–1997	Free State	41	(60)
1998–2001	Western Province	41	(15)
Super Rugby
Years	Team	Apps	(Points)
1998–2001	Stormers	42	(20)
International career
Years	Team	Apps	(Points)
1999–2000	South Africa	12	(5)

Charl Francois Marais (born 2 September 1970) is a South African former rugby union player.

== Playing career ==
Marais matriculated at Grey College and represented Free State at the annual Craven Week tournaments in 1987 and 1988. He made his senior provincial debut for Free State in 1994 and in 1998 he moved to Western Province.

Marais made his test match debut for the Springboks against Italy at the Boet Erasmus Stadium in Port Elizabeth in 1999 and he also played in the second test against Italy. During the 2000 rugby season, Marais played ten test matches for the Springboks and was a member of the end-of-year squad that toured to Argentina, Britain and Ireland. He also played three tour matches for the Springboks.

=== Test history ===
No.	Opponents	Results (SA 1st)	Position	Tries	Dates	Venue
1.	Italy	74–3	Replacement		12 Jun 1999	Boet Erasmus Stadium, Port Elizabeth
2.	Italy	101–0	Replacement	1	19 Jun 1999	Kings Park, Durban
3.	Canada	51–18	Hooker		10 Jun 2000	Basil Kenyon Stadium, East London
4.	England	18–13	Hooker		17 Jun 2000	Loftus Versfeld, Pretoria
5.	England	22–27	Hooker		24 Jun 2000	Free State Stadium, Bloemfontein
6.	Australia	23–44	Hooker		8 Jul 2000	Colonial Stadium, Melbourne
7.	New Zealand	12–25	Hooker		22 Jul 2000	Lancaster Park, Christchurch
8.	Australia	6–26	Hooker		29 Jul 2000	Stadium Australia, Sydney
9.	New Zealand	46–40	Hooker		19 Aug 2000	Ellis Park, Johannesburg
10.	Australia	18–19	Hooker		26 Aug 2000	Kings Park, Durban
11.	Argentina	37–33	Replacement		12 Nov 2000	River Plate Stadium, Buenos Aires
12.	Wales	23–13	Replacement		26 Nov 2000	Millennium Stadium, Cardiff

== See also ==
- List of South Africa national rugby union players – Springbok no. 685
