= André Vos =

South Africa international rugby union player

- Born: André Neal Vos; 9 January 1975 (age 51) East London, South Africa
- Height: 1.90 m (6 ft 3 in)
- Weight: 98 kg (15 st 6 lb; 216 lb)
- School: Selborne College
- University: University of Port Elizabeth

Rugby union career
- Position(s): Number eight, Flanker
Provincial / State sides
| Years | Team | Apps | (Points) |
| 1995 | Eastern Province | 35 | |
| 1997 | Golden Lions | | |
| 2002–2007 | Harlequins | | |
- Correct as of 27 April 2024
Super Rugby
| Years | Team | Apps | (Points) |
| 1998 | Queensland Reds | 11 | (?) |
| 1998 | The Cats | ? | (?) |
- Correct as of 31 August 2019
International career
| Years | Team | Apps | (Points) |
| 1999–2001 | South Africa | 33 | (40) |
- Correct as of 31 August 2019

André Neal Vos (born 9 January 1975) is a former South African rugby union player who played as a loose forward for Eastern Province (South Africa), Queensland Reds (Australia), The Cats, The Lions and Harlequins (England) until his retirement in 2007.

== Rugby career ==
He also captained the Springboks.

Vos attended Selborne College in East London, South Africa (he represented Border at the 1992 Craven Week) and the then University of Port Elizabeth.

He represented South Africa at the U21 and at under 23 level.

He made his senior provincial debut for Eastern Province (then coached by Alex Wyllie) in 1995, and played 35 matches for that province in 1995 and 1996.

He played for the Golden Lions in 1997.

In 1998 he wore the Queensland Reds' jersey in the Super 12 earning 11 full caps for the Australian franchise.

He returned to South African shores in 1998 to play for the Cats in the Super 12 and for the Golden Lions in the South African Currie Cup.

He made his international debut against Italy in Port Elizabeth on 12 June 1999 as a replacement. The final score was 74-3 in favour of the Springboks. He was in the starting 15 for the next match in Durban. He was in and out of the starting 15 for the next eight test matches, starting in only three.

After the IRB Rugby World Cup in 1999 he took over the captaincy of South Africa from Joost van der Westhuizen.

He went on to earn 33 test caps for South Africa (6 as substitute), 16 as captain. He scored 5 tries for South Africa. His international career record is: played 33, won 18, drew 1, lost 14.

Vos retired from international rugby in 2002, saying, "Physically I am no longer up to Springbok rugby."

=== Harlequins ===
Vos signed for Harlequins in 2002. In 2004, he captained the side to their European Challenge Cup victory, beating Clermont Auvergne, at the time known as Montferrand, 27-26 in the final.

In 2006, he captained the side as they won promotion from the RFU Championship back to the Premiership. He captained the side for three years until he resigned at the end of the 2005/6 season, when Paul Volley took over.

== Personal life ==
André Neal Vos was born in East London, South Africa, and pursued his education at Selborne College followed by the University of Port Elizabeth. Off the field, he has been a practising Christian throughout his life, underpinning his reputation as calm, warm, and approachable.

In 2002, early in his stint with Harlequins, Vos married Caroline, who was born in the UK and holds a British passport; helping him secure a free transfer to England. The couple settled first in London, living near Richmond Bridge in a house previously occupied by a predecessor, before later relocating to Cape Town, where Vos now resides.

As Harlequins’ captain in the early to mid-2000s, he was deeply involved in community outreach and charity work, particularly with schools and HopeHIV, earning praise for his humility, constant presence, and positivity; "always there to have a chat, sign an autograph…always with a smile".

After retiring from professional rugby in 2007, Vos shifted his focus to the financial sector in Cape Town, maintaining a low public profile while staying connected to the sport and his community through occasional coaching and mentorship roles.

Sporting positions
| Preceded by Joost van der Westhuizen | Springbok Captain; 1999 - 2001 | Succeeded by Bobby Skinstad |
