= Rod Kafer =

Australian rugby union player

- Born: Rodney Bruce Kafer; 25 June 1971 (age 55) Newcastle, New South Wales, Australia
- Height: 1.76 m (5 ft 9 1/2 in)
- Weight: 101 kg (223 lb)
- School: Canberra Grammar School
- Occupation(s): Wallabies and Brumbies rugby player, Chief Executive Officer, Managing Director

Rugby union career
- Position(s): Centre; Flyhalf
Senior career
| Years | Team | Apps | (Points) |
| 2001–03 | Leicester Tigers | 34 | (30) |
Provincial / State sides
| Years | Team | Apps | (Points) |
| 1991–2001 | ACT and Southern NSW | 89 | (59) |
Super Rugby
| Years | Team | Apps | (Points) |
| 1996–2001 | Brumbies | 37 | (50) |
International career
| Years | Team | Apps | (Points) |
| 1999–2000 | Australia | 12 | (5) |

Rodney B. Kafer (born 25 June 1971) is a retired rugby union player for the ACT Brumbies and the Australian Wallabies. He is remembered by Brumbies fans for kicking a drop-goal in the final minute in a 2001 game against the Cats giving the Brumbies a one-point win. He now works for Fox Sports as a rugby commentator and has a weekly segment on the show Rugby HQ called "Fox Field". He attended Canberra Grammar School in his youth. At the age of 15 he was diagnosed with type 1 diabetes.

Kafer was the first player to have received winners medals from the major Southern and Northern Hemisphere rugby tournaments, the Super 12 with the ACT Brumbies in 2001 and the Heineken Cup with the Leicester Tigers in 2002.

Kafer moved to the northern hemisphere in 2001 and spent two years playing for the Leicester Tigers before signing as player coach for Saracens F.C. However, when Buck Shelford was sacked as head coach, Kafer was appointed in his place and gave up playing.

In addition to his commentating commitments with Fox Sports Rugby, Kafer previously owned a telecommunications company and sold it in 2014 and now works in the Australian Rugby Union in a high performance role.
