= Glenn Panoho =

Australian rugby union international

- Full name: Glenn Matthew Panoho
- Born: 12 May 1971 (age 55) Kaikohe, New Zealand
- Height: 6 ft 0 in (183 cm)
- Weight: 264 lb (120 kg)

Rugby union career
- Position: Prop
International career
Years	Team	Apps	(Points)
1998–2003	Australia	21	(0)

Glenn Matthew Panoho (born 12 May 1971) is an Australian former rugby union international.

Panoho, who is of Maori heritage, was born in Kaikohe, New Zealand. He moved to Queensland at the age of 12 and attended Nudgee College, where his father had been recruited to coach rugby.

A prop, Panoho was an Australian underage representative and made his Queensland Reds debut in 1993. He gained 21 caps for the Wallabies between 1998 and 2003, which included the team's first ever 3–0 series win over the All Blacks, as well as their maiden Tri Nations title.

Panoho was coach of the Sunshine Coast Stingrays from 2007 to 2010, before which he coached Japanese club Ricoh Black Rams for three seasons. He has since joined the construction industry.

== See also ==
- List of Australia national rugby union players
