= Cobus Visagie =

South African rugby union footballer

- Born: Izak Jacobus Visagie; 31 October 1973 (age 53) Stellenbosch, Western Cape, South Africa
- Height: 1.85 m (6 ft 1 in)
- Weight: 118 kg (260 lb)
- School: Paul Roos Gymnasium, Stellenbosch
- University: Stellenbosch University

Rugby union career
- Position: Tighthead prop
Senior career
Years	Team	Apps	(Points)
2003–2009	Saracens	121	(0)
Provincial / State sides
Years	Team	Apps	(Points)
1997–2003	Western Province	42	
Super Rugby
Years	Team	Apps	(Points)
1998–2003	Stormers	46	(5)
International career
Years	Team	Apps	(Points)
1999–2003	South Africa	29	(0)

Izak Jacobus "Cobus" Visagie (born 31 October 1973) is a South African former rugby union footballer who played at tighthead prop.

== Early life ==
Visagie attended the Paul Roos Gymnasium in Stellenbosch and then studied auditing and accounting at Stellenbosch University, where he also played for Maties (Stellenbosch University) and Western Province Rugby representing the under–20 and under–21 teams.

Visagie finished his Bachelor of Commerce, majoring in accounting and audit at Stellenbosch University in 1996. He worked seven years for PricewaterhouseCoopers as a chartered accountant, whilst playing professional rugby.

== Playing career ==
Visagie made his provincial rugby debut for Western Province in 1997 and continued to represent the union as well as the Super Rugby team, the Stormers until 2003.

Visagie won three Currie Cups with Western Province Rugby, the last in 2001 with a home win (at Newlands, Cape Town) over the Natal Sharks. He also earned 46 Super 12 caps with the Stormers. He earned 29 caps for his country and was part of the Springbok team that reached the 1999 Rugby World Cup Semi Final. He was selected to the team of the tournament with fellow Springbok frontrow Os du Randt.

Visagie moved to the United Kingdom to play for the English Premiership club Saracens after being passed over for the 2003 World Cup Springbok squad. He played 121 games for Saracens and was voted into the Guinness Premiership team of the season for three consecutive years. He also represented the Barbarians (8 caps), World XV (3 caps) and the Southern Hemisphere XV that played in the Tsunami Relief game at Twickenham, before retiring from professional rugby in May 2009.

=== Test history ===
No.	Opposition	Result (SA 1st)	Position	Tries	Date	Venue
1.	Italy	74–3	Tighthead prop		12 Jun 1999	Boet Erasmus Stadium, Port Elizabeth
2.	Wales	19–29	Tighthead prop		26 Jun 1998	Millennium Stadium, Cardiff
3.	New Zealand	0–28	Tighthead prop		10 Jul 1999	Carisbrook, Dunedin
4.	Australia	6–32	Tighthead prop		17 Jul 1999	Suncorp Stadium, Brisbane
5.	New Zealand	18–34	Tighthead prop		7 Aug 1999	Loftus Versfeld, Pretoria
6.	Australia	10–9	Tighthead prop		14 Aug 1999	Newlands, Cape Town
7.	Scotland	46–29	Tighthead prop		3 Oct 1999	Murrayfield, Edinburgh
8.	Uruguay	39–3	Tighthead prop		15 Oct 1999	Hampden Park, Glasgow
9.	England	44–21	Tighthead prop		24 Oct 1999	Stade de France, Paris
10.	Australia	21–27	Tighthead prop		30 Oct 1999	Twickenham, London
11.	New Zealand	22–18	Tighthead prop		4 Nov 1999	Millennium Stadium, Cardiff
12.	Canada	51–18	Tighthead prop		10 Jun 2000	Basil Kenyon Stadium, East London
13.	England	22–27	Tighthead prop		24 Jun 2000	Free State Stadium, Bloemfontein
14.	Australia	23–44	Tighthead prop		8 Jul 2000	Colonial Stadium, Melbourne
15.	New Zealand	12–25	Tighthead prop		22 Jul 2000	Jade Stadium, Christchurch
16.	Australia	6–26	Tighthead prop		29 Jul 2000	Stadium Australia, Sydney
17.	New Zealand	46–40	Tighthead prop		19 Aug 2000	Ellis Park, Johannesburg
18.	Australia	18–19	Tighthead prop		26 Aug 2000	Kings Park, Durban
19.	New Zealand	3–12	Tighthead prop		21 Jul 2001	Newlands, Cape Town
20.	Australia	20–15	Tighthead prop		28 Jul 2001	Loftus Versfeld, Pretoria
21.	Australia	14–14	Tighthead prop		18 Aug 2001	Subiaco Oval, Perth
22.	New Zealand	15–26	Tighthead prop		25 Aug 2001	Eden Park, Auckland
23.	France	10–20	Tighthead prop		10 Nov 2001	Stade de France, Paris
24.	Italy	54–26	Substitute		17 Nov 2001	Stadio Marassi, Genova
25.	England	9–29	Substitute		24 Nov 2001	Twickenham, London
26.	United States	43–20	Tighthead prop		1 Dec 2001	Robertson Stadium, Houston
27.	Scotland	29–25	Substitute		7 Jun 2003	Kings Park, Durban
28.	Scotland	28–19	Substitute		14 Jun 2003	Ellis Park, Johannesburg
29.	Argentina	26–25	Tighthead prop		28 Jun 2003	Boet Erasmus Stadium, Port Elizabeth

== Later career ==
Visagie joined Premier Team Holdings Limited as Commercial Director of the Group of four companies based in the United Kingdom. In 2011, he was appointed Principal for Africa at Templewood Merchant Bank. The following year, he co-founded Africa Merchant Capital, based in London to focus exclusively on investment, corporate finance advisory, private equity deal origination and syndication in Sub-Saharan Africa.

== Accolades ==
Visagie was one of the five South African Rugby players of the Year for 1999, along with Breyton Paulse, Joost van der Westhuizen, Hennie le Roux and the eventual winner of Player of the Year, Andre Venter.

== See also ==
- List of South Africa national rugby union players – Springbok no. 683
