= Chris Latham (rugby union) =

Australian rugby union footballer and coach

- Born: Christopher Eric Latham; 8 September 1975 (age 51) Narrabri, New South Wales, Australia
- Height: 192 cm (6 ft 4 in)
- Weight: 99 kg (15 st 8 lb)
- School: Narrabri High School

Rugby union career
- Position: Fullback / Wing
Senior career
Years	Team	Apps	(Points)
1997–98	Waratahs	10	
1998–2008	Reds	117	(211)
2008–10	Worcester Warriors	46	(42)
2010–12	Kyuden Voltex		
- Correct as of 28 February 2012
International career
Years	Team	Apps	(Points)
1998–2007	Australia	78	(200)
- Correct as of 24 October 2011
National sevens team
Years	Team		Comps
1997, 2006	Australia		
- Correct as of 24 October 2011
Coaching career
- Years: Team
- 2013–18: NTT Docomo (assistant)
- 2018–19: Samoa (assistant)
- 2020: Utah Warriors
- 2024: Seattle Seawolves (assistant)
- 2025–pres.: Chicago Hounds

Chris Latham (born 8 September 1975) is an Australian rugby union coach and former player. He is currently head coach of Major League Rugby team the Chicago Hounds and was previously head coach of the Utah Warriors.

Latham played for the Queensland Reds and Australia between 1998 and 2007, earning 78 international caps, before signing with Worcester Warriors in England and later Japanese club Kyuden Voltex. He is the second-highest try scorer in Wallaby history with 40 international tries, behind only David Campese.

== Career ==
Latham began his career playing at the Wests Bulldogs club in Brisbane before signing a Super Rugby contract with the New South Wales Waratahs. He moved to the Queensland Reds in 1998 and cemented his place as a starting No. 15. He went on to become the first player to win the Australian Super Rugby Player of the Year award four times (2000, 2003, 2004, 2005).

Latham made his international debut against France on the 1998 spring tour and represented the Wallabies at three Rugby World Cups in 1999, 2003 and 2007. At the 2003 tournament, he racked up an Australian record five-try haul against Namibia in Adelaide.

At the Northern Hemisphere v Southern Hemisphere Tsunami Relief match held at Twickenham in March 2005, he scored two tries and was named man of the match.

The following March, he represented the Australia Sevens team at the 2006 Commonwealth Games in Melbourne, but his campaign was cut short when he suffered a rib injury.

On 12 September 2006, he became the first backline player to be awarded the John Eales Medal and was later nominated by the International Rugby Board for Player of the Year, losing out to New Zealand's Richie McCaw.

Latham suffered misfortune in early 2007 when he tore his anterior cruciate ligament in pre-season training with the Queensland Reds but managed to return for his third Rugby World Cup in October that year.

After a frustrating end to 2007 and start to the 2008 Super Rugby season where he battled a knee injury his representative career in Australia came to an untimely close in his return match against the Crusaders. In what should have been his penultimate appearance for the Queensland Reds, he ruptured his pectoral muscle 13 minutes into the game, drawing an end to his playing days on Australian soil, as he had already announced a move to Worcester for the following two seasons.

After leaving Worcester, he joined Kyuden Voltex, a second-division club in Japan, on a two-year contract. He was also involved in skills training and backs coaching at Kyuden, and helped them win promotion to the top division for 2012–13 before retiring in 2012.

Stephen Jones, chief rugby correspondent for The Times and The Sunday Times, rated Latham as the finest fullback he has ever seen.

== Coaching Career ==
Latham was head coach of the Utah Warriors of Major League Rugby during the pandemic-shortened 2020 season. In January 2021, the Warriors announced that Latham was resigning his role as head coach for personal reasons. He would later rejoin the MLR as an assistant coach for the Seattle Seawolves in 2024 before being appointed to his second head coaching position with the Chicago Hounds ahead of the 2025 season.

During the 2026 Major League Rugby season, Latham guided the Hounds to the first perfect season in league history, setting numerous league records and earning Coach of the Year honors.

Preceded by Jeremy Paul	John Eales Medal; 2006	Succeeded by Nathan Sharpe
