= Sam Cordingley =

Australia international rugby union player

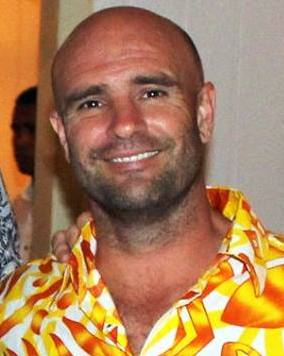
- Born: Sam Cordingley; 20 March 1976 (age 50) Sydney, Australia
- Height: 178 cm (5 ft 10 in)
- Weight: 87 kg (13 st 10 lb)
- School: St Patrick's Marist College Dundas

Rugby union career
- Position: Scrum-half
Youth career
- Dundas Valley
Senior career
Years	Team	Apps	(Points)
2002–04	Swansea		
2004–06	Grenoble	15	(0)
2008–10	Grenoble	33	(5)
Provincial / State sides
Years	Team	Apps	(Points)
- Manly
-	Brothers	50	(25)
Super Rugby
Years	Team	Apps	(Points)
1998–99	Brumbies	7	(15)
1999–2001 2006–08	Reds	58	(15)
2011	Rebels	2	(0)
International career
Years	Team	Apps	(Points)
2000–	Australia	23	(0)
2008–	Australia A		

Sam "Rat" Cordingley (born 20 March 1976) is a former Australian rugby union footballer and member of the Wallabies. Before retirement he played for the Melbourne Rebels. He was educated at the St Patrick's Marist College, Dundas.

== Career ==
He played junior rugby for Dundas Valley. He also played for the He has one daughter named Remy. Eastwood Rugby Club in Sydney, and made his debut for Queensland against Auckland in 1999. Cordingley made his Super 12 debut for the Queensland Reds that season in a match against the Wellington Hurricanes.

The following season he was called up to the Wallabies squad and made his debut against Argentina. He went back at the Reds after three seasons in Europe with Welsh side Swansea and Grenoble of France.

After playing for the Reds in 2006, he was selected for the Wallabies squad. For the European winter season 2008–09, he returned to FC Grenoble, in the French Pro D2. The Melbourne Rebels signed Cordingley as a foundation member of their Super Rugby franchise 3 April 2010. However, he missed several games early in the 2011 Super Rugby season due to a hip injury.

== After retirement ==
Cordingley remained with the Rebels after the 2011 season. In 2012, he was 'Player Recruitment Manager', first point of contact for prospective Rebels players, and continued as 'list manager' in 2013. Early in 2014 Cordingley became General Manager of Rugby Operations at QRU.
