= 1999 Tri Nations Series =

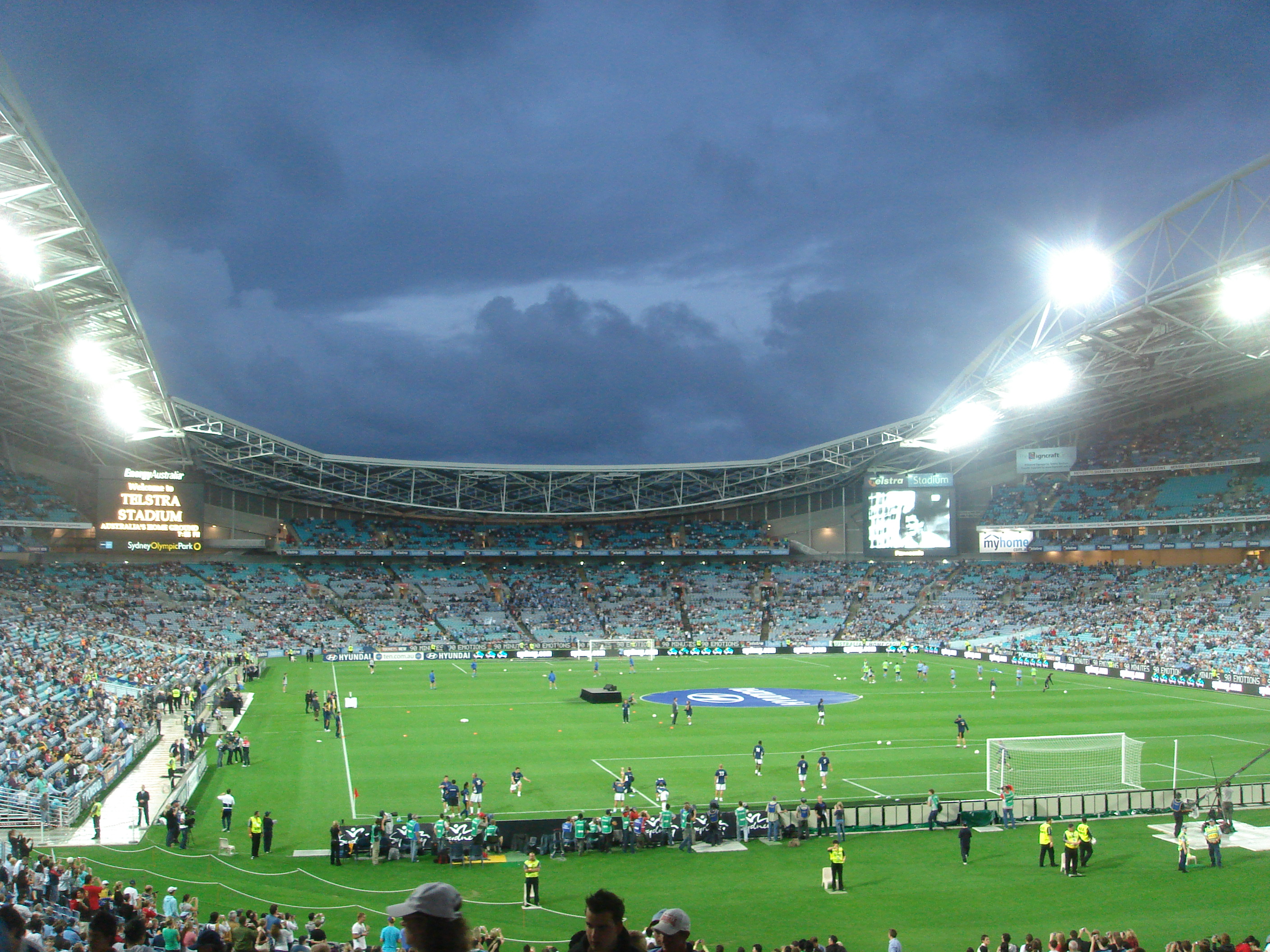

Final positions
- Champions: New Zealand (3rd title)
- Bledisloe Cup: Australia

Tournament statistics
- Matches played: 6
- Tries scored: 17 (2.83 per match)
- Attendance: 326,219 (54,370 per match)
- Top scorer(s): Mehrtens (66)
- Most tries: Cullen (3)

The 1999 Tri Nations Series was the fourth Tri Nations Series, a rugby union tournament contested by the men's national teams of Australia, New Zealand and South Africa. It was contested from 10 July to 28 August 1999. New Zealand won the title, winning three of their four matches, including both against South Africa; however, they split the series against Australia, who retained the Bledisloe Cup, having won it outright the previous year.

== Table ==
Place	Nation	Games				Points			Try bonus	Losing bonus	Table points
Place	Nation	Played	Won	Drawn	Lost	For	Against	Diff	Try bonus	Losing bonus	Table points
1	New Zealand	4	3	0	1	103	61	+42	0	0	12
2	Australia	4	2	0	2	84	57	+27	1	1	10
3	South Africa	4	1	0	3	34	103	−69	0	0	4

== Results ==
=== Round 1 ===
10 July 1999
19:35 NZST (UTC+12)

New Zealand	28–0	South Africa
Try: Cullen; Marshall; Wilson; Con: Brown; Mehrtens; Pen: Mehrtens (3)

Carisbrook, Dunedin
Attendance: 41,500
Referee: Peter Marshall (Australia)

FB	15	Jeff Wilson
RW	14	Christian Cullen
OC	13	Alama Ieremia
IC	12	Daryl Gibson
LW	11	Tana Umaga
FH	10	Andrew Mehrtens
SH	9	Justin Marshall
N8	8	Taine Randell (c)
OF	7	Josh Kronfeld
BF	6	Andrew Blowers
RL	5	Robin Brooke
LL	4	Norm Maxwell
TP	3	Kees Meeuws
HK	2	Anton Oliver
LP	1	Carl Hoeft
Replacements:
HK	16	Mark Hammett
PR	17	Greg Feek
LK	18	Royce Willis
FL	19	Dylan Mika
SH	20	Byron Kelleher
FH	21	Tony Brown
WG	22	Jonah Lomu
Coach:
John Hart

FB	15	Percy Montgomery
RW	14	Breyton Paulse
OC	13	Pieter Muller
IC	12	Japie Mulder
LW	11	Pieter Rossouw
FH	10	Gaffie du Toit
SH	9	Dave von Hoesslin
N8	8	Gary Teichmann (c)
BF	7	Rassie Erasmus
OF	6	André Venter
RL	5	Mark Andrews
LL	4	Krynauw Otto
TP	3	Cobus Visagie
HK	2	Naka Drotské
LP	1	Os du Randt
Replacements:
PR	16	Ollie le Roux
PR	17	Willie Meyer
LK	18	Selborne Boome
FL	19	André Vos
SH	20	Werner Swanepoel
CE	21	Robbie Fleck
FH	22	Braam van Straaten
Coach:
Nick Mallett

=== Round 2 ===
17 July 1999
20:00 AEST (UTC+10)

(1 BP) Australia	32–6	South Africa
Try: Roff (2); Horan; Burke; Con: Burke (3); Pen: Burke (2)		Pen: Van Straaten (2)

Lang Park, Brisbane
Attendance: 31,677
Referee: Paddy O'Brien (New Zealand)

FB	15	Matt Burke
RW	14	Ben Tune
OC	13	Daniel Herbert
IC	12	Nathan Grey
LW	11	Joe Roff
FH	10	Tim Horan
SH	9	George Gregan
N8	8	Toutai Kefu
OF	7	David Wilson (c)
BF	6	Matt Cockbain
RL	5	John Welborn
LL	4	David Giffin
TP	3	Patricio Noriega
HK	2	Jeremy Paul
LP	1	Dan Crowley
Coach:
Rod Macqueen

FB	15	Percy Montgomery
RW	14	Breyton Paulse
OC	13	Robbie Fleck
IC	12	Pieter Muller
LW	11	Stefan Terblance
FH	10	Braam van Straaten
SH	9	Werner Swanepoel
N8	8	Anton Leonard
BF	7	André Venter
OF	6	Rassie Erasmus (c)
RL	5	Krynauw Otto
LL	4	Selborne Boome
TP	3	Cobus Visagie
HK	2	Naka Drotské
LP	1	Os du Randt
Coach:
Nick Mallett

=== Round 3 ===
24 July 1999
19:35 NZST (UTC+12)

New Zealand	34–15	Australia
Try: Marshall; Con: Mehrtens; Pen: Mehrtens (9)		Try: Gregan; Herbert; Con: Burke; Pen: Burke

Eden Park, Auckland
Attendance: 49,000
Referee: Derek Bevan (Wales)

FB	15	Jeff Wilson
RW	14	Christian Cullen
OC	13	Alama Ieremia
IC	12	Daryl Gibson
LW	11	Tana Umaga
FH	10	Andrew Mehrtens
SH	9	Justin Marshall
N8	8	Taine Randell (c)
OF	7	Josh Kronfeld
BF	6	Dylan Mika
RL	5	Robin Brooke
LL	4	Norm Maxwell
TP	3	Kees Meeuws
HK	2	Anton Oliver
LP	1	Carl Hoeft
Replacements:
HK	16	Mark Hammett
PR	17	Greg Feek
LK	18	Andrew Blowers
FL	19	Royce Willis
SH	20	Byron Kelleher
FH	21	Tony Brown
WG	22	Jonah Lomu
Coach:
John Hart

FB	15	Matt Burke
RW	14	Ben Tune
OC	13	Daniel Herbert
IC	12	Nathan Grey
LW	11	Joe Roff
FH	10	Tim Horan
SH	9	George Gregan
N8	8	Tiaan Strauss
OF	7	David Wilson (c)
BF	6	Matt Cockbain
RL	5	John Welborn
LL	4	David Giffin
TP	3	Patricio Noriega
HK	2	Jeremy Paul
LP	1	Glen Panaho
Replacements:
PR	16	Phil Kearns
PR	17	Dan Crowley
LK	18	Mark Connors
N8	19	Toutai Kefu
SH	20	Chris Whitaker
CE	21	Jason Little
FB	22	Chris Latham
Coach:
Rod Macqueen

=== Round 4 ===
7 August 1999
15:00 SAST (UTC+02)

South Africa	18–34	New Zealand
Try: Snyman; Van der Westhuizen; Con: Du Toit; Pen: Du Toit (2)		Try: Cullen (2); Pen: Mehrtens (7); Drop: Wilson

Loftus Versfeld Stadium, Pretoria
Attendance: 49,000
Referee: Ed Morrison (England)

FB	15	Percy Montgomery
RW	14	Deon Kayser
OC	13	André Snyman
IC	12	Franco Smith
LW	11	Pieter Rossouw
FH	10	Gaffie du Toit
SH	9	Joost van der Westhuizen (c)
N8	8	Rassie Erasmus
BF	7	Ruben Kruger
OF	6	André Venter
RL	5	Albert van den Berg
LL	4	Selborne Boome
TP	3	Cobus Visagie
HK	2	Naka Drotské
LP	1	Os du Randt
Replacements:
HK	16	Chris Rossouw
PR	17	Ollie le Roux
LK	18	Mark Andrews
FL	19	André Vos
SH	20	Werner Swanepoel
CE	21	Robbie Fleck
WG	22	Stefan Terblanche
Coach:
Nick Mallett

FB	15	Jeff Wilson
RW	14	Christian Cullen
OC	13	Alama Ieremia
IC	12	Daryl Gibson
LW	11	Tana Umaga
FH	10	Andrew Mehrtens
SH	9	Justin Marshall
N8	8	Taine Randell (c)
OF	7	Josh Kronfeld
BF	6	Andrew Blowers
RL	5	Robin Brooke
LL	4	Norm Maxwell
TP	3	Kees Meeuws
HK	2	Anton Oliver
LP	1	Greg Feek
Replacements:
HK	16	Mark Hammett
PR	17	Craig Dowd
LK	18	Royce Willis
FL	19	Reuben Thorne
SH	20	Byron Kelleher
FH	21	Tony Brown
WG	22	Jonah Lomu
Coach:
John Hart

=== Round 5 ===
14 August 1999
15:00 SAST (UTC+02)

South Africa	10–9	Australia (1 BP)
Try: Fleck; Con: De Beer; Pen: De Beer		Pen: Burke (3)

Newlands Stadium, Cape Town
Attendance: 48,000
Referee: Colin Hawke (New Zealand)

FB	15	Percy Montgomery
RW	14	Deon Kayser
OC	13	Robbie Fleck
IC	12	Brendan Venter
LW	11	Pieter Rossouw
FH	10	Jannie de Beer
SH	9	Joost van der Westhuizen (c)
N8	8	Rassie Erasmus
BF	7	André Venter
OF	6	André Vos
RL	5	Albert van den Berg
LL	4	Selborne Boome
TP	3	Cobus Visagie
HK	2	Naka Drotské
LP	1	Os du Randt
Coach:
Nick Mallett

FB	15	Matt Burke
RW	14	Ben Tune
OC	13	Daniel Herbert
IC	12	Nathan Grey
LW	11	Joe Roff
FH	10	Tim Horan
SH	9	George Gregan
N8	8	Toutai Kefu
OF	7	David Wilson (c)
BF	6	Matt Cockbain
RL	5	Tom Bowman
LL	4	David Giffin
TP	3	Andrew Blades
HK	2	Phil Kearns
LP	1	Richard Harry
Coach:
Rod Macqueen

=== Round 6 ===
28 August 1999
20:00 AEST (UTC+10)

Australia	28–7	New Zealand
Try: Connors; Con: Burke; Pen: Burke (7)		Try: Mehrtens; Con: Mehrtens

Stadium Australia, Sydney
Attendance: 107,042
Referee: Jim Fleming (Scotland)

FB	15	Matt Burke
RW	14	Ben Tune
OC	13	Daniel Herbert
IC	12	Tim Horan
LW	11	Jason Little
FH	10	Rod Kafer
SH	9	George Gregan
N8	8	Toutai Kefu
OF	7	David Wilson (c)
BF	6	Matt Cockbain
RL	5	Mark Connors
LL	4	David Giffin
TP	3	Andrew Blades
HK	2	Phil Kearns
LP	1	Richard Harry
Replacements:
HK	16	Michael Foley
PR	17	Patricio Noriega
FL	18	Owen Finegan
N8	19	Tiaan Strauss
SH	20	Chris Whitaker
CE	21	Nathan Grey
WG	22	Joe Roff
Coach:
Rod Macqueen

FB	15	Jeff Wilson
RW	14	Christian Cullen
OC	13	Alama Ieremia
IC	12	Daryl Gibson
LW	11	Tana Umaga
FH	10	Andrew Mehrtens
SH	9	Justin Marshall
N8	8	Taine Randell (c)
OF	7	Josh Kronfeld
BF	6	Dylan Mika
RL	5	Robin Brooke
LL	4	Norm Maxwell
TP	3	Kees Meeuws
HK	2	Anton Oliver
LP	1	Carl Hoeft
Replacements:
HK	16	Mark Hammett
PR	17	Craig Dowd
LK	18	Royce Willis
FL	19	Andrew Blowers
SH	20	Byron Kelleher
FH	21	Tony Brown
WG	22	Jonah Lomu
Coach:
John Hart
