= 1998 Tri Nations Series =

Final positions
- Champions: South Africa (1st title)
- Bledisloe Cup: Australia

Tournament statistics
- Matches played: 6
- Tries scored: 22 (3.67 per match)
- Attendance: 295,697 (49,283 per match)
- Top scorer(s): Matt Burke (50)
- Most tries: Matt Burke (3)

The 1998 Tri Nations Series was contested from 11 July to 22 August between the Australia, New Zealand and South Africa national rugby union teams. The Springboks won the tournament.

Australia won the Bledisloe Cup, which New Zealand had won for the 3 previous years. The two Tri-Nations tests gave it a winning 2–0 lead. (It went on to make it 3–0 in the third test which came after the Tri-Nations.)

== Table ==
Place	Nation	Games				Points			Try bonus	Losing bonus	Table points
Place	Nation	Played	Won	Drawn	Lost	For	Against	Diff	Try bonus	Losing bonus	Table points
1	South Africa	4	4	0	0	80	54	+26	1	0	17
2	Australia	4	2	0	2	79	82	–3	1	1	10
3	New Zealand	4	0	0	4	65	88	–23	0	2	2

== Results ==
=== Round 1 ===
11 July 1998
20:00 AEST (UTC+10)

Australia	24–16	New Zealand
Try: Burke 29' c, 33' m Con: Burke (1/2) 29'; Pen: Burke (4/6) 25', 47', 54', 70'	Report	Try: Kronfeld 22' m I. Jones 40' m Pen: Mehrtens 20'; Spencer (1)

Melbourne Cricket Ground, Melbourne
Attendance: 75,127
Referee: Clayton Thomas (Wales)

FB	15	Matt Burke
RW	14	Ben Tune
OC	13	Daniel Herbert
IC	12	Tim Horan
LW	11	Joe Roff
FH	10	Stephen Larkham
SH	9	George Gregan
N8	8	Toutai Kefu	(substituted off) 45'
OF	7	David Wilson
BF	6	Matt Cockbain
RL	5	John Eales (c)
LL	4	Tom Bowman
TP	3	Andrew Blades
HK	2	Phil Kearns
LP	1	Richard Harry	(substituted off) 15'
Replacements:
PR	16	Dan Crowley	(substituted in) 15'
FL	17	Viliami Ofahengaue	(substituted in) 45'	(substituted off) 76'
HK	18	Jeremy Paul
FL	19	Owen Finegan		(substituted in) 76'
SH	20	Chris Whitaker
CE	21	Nathan Grey
CE	22	Jason Little
Coach:
(Australia) Rod Macqueen

FB	15	Christian Cullen
RW	14	Jeff Wilson
OC	13	Scott McLeod		(substituted off) 72'
IC	12	Walter Little
LW	11	Joeli Vidiri	(substituted off) 62'
FH	10	Andrew Mehrtens	(substituted off) 45'	(substituted in) 72'
SH	9	Justin Marshall
N8	8	Taine Randell (c)
OF	7	Josh Kronfeld
BF	6	Michael Jones	(substituted off) 62'
RL	5	Robin Brooke
LL	4	Ian Jones
TP	3	Olo Brown
HK	2	Anton Oliver
LP	1	Craig Dowd
Replacements:
HK	16	Mark Hammett
PR	17	Carl Hoeft
LK	18	Royce Willis
FL	19	Isitolo Maka	(substituted in) 62'
SH	20	Ofisa Tonu'u
FH	21	Carlos Spencer	(substituted in) 45'
WG	22	Jonah Lomu	(substituted in) 62'
Coach:
(New Zealand) John Hart

Man of the Match:
Matt Burke (Australia)

Touch judges:
Ed Morrison (England)
Andre Watson (South Africa)

=== Round 2 ===
18 July 1998
20:05 AEST (UTC+10)

(1 BP) Australia	13–14	South Africa
Try: Tune 5' m Gregan 52' m Pen: Burke 40'	Report	Try: Van der Westhuizen m Pen: Montgomery 8', 43', 61'

Subiaco Oval, Perth
Attendance: 38,079
Referee: Colin Hawke (New Zealand)

FB	15	Matt Burke
RW	14	Ben Tune
OC	13	Daniel Herbert
IC	12	Tim Horan
LW	11	Joe Roff
FH	10	Stephen Larkham
SH	9	George Gregan
N8	8	Toutai Kefu
OF	7	David Wilson
BF	6	Matt Cockbain
RL	5	John Eales (c)
LL	4	Tom Bowman
TP	3	Andrew Blades
HK	2	Phil Kearns
LP	1	Dan Crowley
Replacements:
SH	16	Chris Whitaker
CE	17	Nathan Grey
WG	18	Damian Smith
FL	19	Viliami Ofahengaue
FL	20	Owen Finegan
PR	21	Glen Panoho
HK	22	Jeremy Paul
Coach:
(Australia) Rod Macqueen

FB	15	Percy Montgomery
RW	14	Stefan Terblanche
OC	13	Andre Snyman
IC	12	Pieter Muller
LW	11	Pieter Rossouw
FH	10	Henry Honiball
SH	9	Joost van der Westhuizen
N8	8	Gary Teichmann (c)
OF	7	Andre Venter
BF	6	Rassie Erasmus
RL	5	Mark Andrews
LL	4	Krynauw Otto
TP	3	Adrian Garvey
HK	2	James Dalton
LP	1	Robbie Kempson
Replacements:
WG	16	Chester Williams
PR	17	Ollie le Roux
FH	18	Franco Smith
SH	19	Werner Swanepoel
FL	20	Andrew Aitken
N8	21	Bobby Skinstad
HK	22	Naka Drotské
Coach:
(South Africa) Nick Mallett

Notes:

- This was the first rugby test match staged at Subiaco Oval.

=== Round 3 ===
25 July 1998
19:35 NZST (UTC+12)

New Zealand	3–13	South Africa
Pen: Mehrtens		Try: Rossouw; Con: Montgomery; Pen: Montgomery (2)

Athletic Park, Wellington
Attendance: 39,500
Referee: Ed Morrison (England)

FB	15	Christian Cullen
RW	14	Jeff Wilson
OC	13	Mark Mayerhofler
IC	12	Walter Little
LW	11	Jonah Lomu
FH	10	Carlos Spencer
SH	9	Justin Marshall
N8	8	Taine Randell (c)
OF	7	Josh Kronfeld
BF	6	Michael Jones
RL	5	Robin Brooke
LL	4	Ian Jones
TP	3	Olo Brown
HK	2	Anton Oliver
LP	1	Craig Dowd
Replacements:
CE	16	Scott McLeod
FH	17	Andrew Mehrtens
SH	18	Ofisa Tonu'u
N8	19	Isitolo Maka
LK	20	Royce Willis
PR	21	Carl Hoeft
HK	22	Mark Hammett
Coach:
John Hart

FB	15	Percy Montgomery
RW	14	Stefan Terblanche
OC	13	Andre Snyman
IC	12	Pieter Muller
LW	11	Pieter Rossouw
FH	10	Henry Honiball
SH	9	Joost van der Westhuizen
N8	8	Gary Teichmann (c)
BF	7	Andre Venter
OF	6	Andrew Aitken
RL	5	Mark Andrews
LL	4	Krynauw Otto
TP	3	Adrian Garvey
HK	2	James Dalton
LP	1	Robbie Kempson
Replacements:
WG	16	Chester Williams
FH	17	Franco Smith
SH	18	Werner Swanepoel
LK	19	Selborne Boome
N8	20	Bobby Skinstad
PR	21	Ollie le Roux
HK	22	Naka Drotské
Coach:
(South Africa) Nick Mallett

=== Round 4 ===
1 August 1998
19:35 NZST (UTC+12)

(1 BP) New Zealand	23–27	Australia (1 BP)
Try: Cullen; Lomu; Con: Mehrtens (2); Pen: Mehrtens (3)		Try: Bowman; Burke; Larkham; Little; Con: Eales (2); Pen: Burke

Lancaster Park, Christchurch
Attendance: 35,683
Referee: Derek Bevan (Wales)

FB	15	Christian Cullen
RW	14	Jeff Wilson
OC	13	Mark Mayerhofler
IC	12	Walter Little
LW	11	Jonah Lomu
FH	10	Andrew Mehrtens
SH	9	Justin Marshall
N8	8	Taine Randell (c)
OF	7	Mark Carter
BF	6	Michael Jones
RL	5	Robin Brooke
LL	4	Ian Jones
TP	3	Olo Brown
HK	2	Anton Oliver
LP	1	Craig Dowd
Replacements:
CE	16	Scott McLeod
FH	17	Carlos Spencer
SH	18	Ofisa Tonu'u
FL	19	Scott Robertson
LK	20	Royce Willis
PR	21	Carl Hoeft
HK	22	Mark Hammett
Coach:
John Hart

FB	15	Matt Burke
RW	14	Jason Little
OC	13	Daniel Herbert
IC	12	Tim Horan
LW	11	Joe Roff
FH	10	Stephen Larkham
SH	9	George Gregan
N8	8	Toutai Kefu
OF	7	David Wilson
BF	6	Matt Cockbain
RL	5	John Eales (c)
LL	4	Tom Bowman
TP	3	Andrew Blades
HK	2	Phil Kearns
LP	1	Richard Harry
Replacements:
SH	16	Chris Whitaker
CE	17	Nathan Grey
WG	18	Damian Smith
FL	19	Viliami Ofahengaue
FL	20	Owen Finegan
PR	21	Glen Panoho
HK	22	Jeremy Paul
Coach:
(Australia) Rod Macqueen

=== Round 5 ===
15 August 1998
15:00 SAST (UTC+02)

(1 BP) South Africa	24–23	New Zealand (1 BP)
Try: Dalton; Skinstad; Terblanche; Van der Westhuizen; Con: Montgomery (2)		Try: Marshall; Randell; Con: Mehrtens (2); Pen: Mehrtens (3)

Kings Park Stadium, Durban
Attendance: 45,000
Referee: Peter Marshall (Australia)

FB	15	Percy Montgomery
RW	14	Stefan Terblanche
OC	13	Andre Snyman
IC	12	Pieter Muller
LW	11	Pieter Rossouw
FH	10	Henry Honiball
SH	9	Joost van der Westhuizen
N8	8	Gary Teichmann (c)
BF	7	Andre Venter
OF	6	Rassie Erasmus
RL	5	Mark Andrews
LL	4	Krynauw Otto
TP	3	Adrian Garvey
HK	2	James Dalton
LP	1	Robbie Kempson
Replacements:
WG	16	Chester Williams
FH	17	Franco Smith
SH	18	Werner Swanepoel
FL	19	Andrew Aitken
N8	20	Bobby Skinstad
PR	21	Ollie le Roux
HK	22	Naka Drotské
Coach:
(South Africa) Nick Mallett

FB	15	Christian Cullen
RW	14	Jeff Wilson
OC	13	Eroni Clarke
IC	12	Mark Mayerhofler
LW	11	Jonah Lomu
FH	10	Andrew Mehrtens
SH	9	Justin Marshall
N8	8	Isitolo Maka
OF	7	Josh Kronfeld
BF	6	Taine Randell (c)
RL	5	Robin Brooke
LL	4	Royce Willis
TP	3	Olo Brown
HK	2	Anton Oliver
LP	1	Carl Hoeft
Replacements:
WG	16	Norm Berryman
FH	17	Carlos Spencer
SH	18	Mark Robinson
N8	19	Scott Robertson
LK	20	Ian Jones
PR	21	Craig Dowd
HK	22	Mark Hammett
Coach:
John Hart

=== Round 6 ===
22 August 1998
15:00 SAST (UTC+02)

South Africa	29–15	Australia
Try: Garvey; Skinstad; Con: Montgomery (2); Pen: Montgomery (5)		Pen: Burke (5)

Ellis Park Stadium Johannesburg
Attendance: 62,308
Referee: Jim Fleming (Scotland)

FB	15	Percy Montgomery
RW	14	Stefan Terblanche
OC	13	Andre Snyman
IC	12	Pieter Muller
LW	11	Pieter Rossouw
FH	10	Henry Honiball
SH	9	Joost van der Westhuizen
N8	8	Gary Teichmann (c)
BF	7	Andre Venter
OF	6	Rassie Erasmus
RL	5	Mark Andrews
LL	4	Krynauw Otto
TP	3	Adrian Garvey
HK	2	James Dalton
LP	1	Robbie Kempson
Replacements:
WG	16	Chester Williams
FH	17	Franco Smith
SH	18	Werner Swanepoel
FL	19	Andrew Aitken
N8	20	Bobby Skinstad
PR	21	Ollie le Roux
HK	22	Naka Drotské
Coach:
(South Africa) Nick Mallett

FB	15	Matt Burke
RW	14	Ben Tune
OC	13	Daniel Herbert
IC	12	Tim Horan
LW	11	Joe Roff
FH	10	Stephen Larkham
SH	9	George Gregan
N8	8	Toutai Kefu
OF	7	David Wilson
BF	6	Matt Cockbain
RL	5	John Eales (c)
LL	4	Tom Bowman
TP	3	Andrew Blades
HK	2	Phil Kearns
LP	1	Dan Crowley
Replacements:
SH	16	Chris Whitaker
CE	17	Nathan Grey
WG	18	Damian Smith
FL	19	Viliami Ofahengaue
FL	20	Owen Finegan
PR	21	Glen Panoho
HK	22	Jeremy Paul
Coach:
(Australia) Rod Macqueen
