= 1999 Rugby World Cup final =

Rugby competition in Cardiff, Wales

1999 Rugby World Cup Final
- Event: 1999 Rugby World Cup
Australia	France
(Australia)	(France)
35	12
- Date: 6 November 1999
- Venue: Millennium Stadium, Cardiff, Wales
- Referee: André Watson (South Africa)
- Attendance: 72,500

The 1999 Rugby World Cup Final was the final match in the 1999 Rugby World Cup. It was played at the Millennium Stadium in Cardiff, Wales, on 6 November 1999, between Australia and France with 72,500 in attendance.

Australia won the game by 35 points to 12, and with it, their second World Cup, having also won the 1991 tournament in England.

== Match summary ==
=== First half ===
In front of a capacity crowd of 72,500 at the recently completed Millennium Stadium, Australia met France in the fourth Rugby World Cup final. For both teams it was their second final. Australia were resilient in defence throughout the tournament while France promised an attacking back line full of talent. In damp and cold conditions France took an early lead with a Christophe Lamaison penalty after two minutes. Matt Burke equalled the scores after four minutes with a successful kick. The Australian forwards dominated in the loose and their tactic of continually kicking for territory and position proved effective. Lamaison offered some respite by slotting a 12th-minute penalty to give France a 6–3 lead. Injury and the subsequent substitution of Olivier Magne disrupted the France back row line-up after 20 minutes. Matt Burke's kicking was important as time and again French exuberance in the loose was penalised. By half-time the Australians led 12–6 with all points from the two goal kickers.

=== Second half ===
As with the first half Burke and Lamaison traded penalty goals. After an hour the contest was still in the balance with the score at 18–12 to Australia. France continued to look lacklustre as the Wallabies began to mount a series of attacks.

A Burke penalty after 64 minutes put Australia more than one score in front, and theoretically clear. With only 15 minutes remaining Ben Tune crashed over for the first try of the contest with Burke again adding the conversion points. The last action of the final was a rolling forward surge and try for Australian second-half substitute Owen Finegan. Inevitably Matt Burke slotted the conversion. Referee André Watson called time on the contest with Australia emphatic winners 35–12.

Again the final was hardly a classic match, though the modern approach of effective defensive lines and an outstanding goal kicking display proved to be rewarded. Australia were rewarded for their efforts with a second World Cup win and captain John Eales accepted the Webb Ellis Cup from Queen Elizabeth.

== Match details ==
6 November 1999
15:00 WET/GMT (UTC+00)

Australia	35–12	France
Try: Tune 65' c Finegan 80' c Con: Burke (2/2) 65', 80'; Pen: Burke (7/7) 4', 14' 24', 40', 45', 58', 64'	Report	Pen: Lamaison (4/4) 1', 11', 51', 60'

Millennium Stadium, Cardiff
Attendance: 72,500
Referee: André Watson (South Africa)

Australia	France

FB	15	Matt Burke
RW	14	Ben Tune
OC	13	Daniel Herbert	(substituted off) 46'
IC	12	Tim Horan	(substituted off) 79'
LW	11	Joe Roff
FH	10	Stephen Larkham
SH	9	George Gregan	(substituted off) 79'
N8	8	Toutai Kefu
OF	7	David Wilson
BF	6	Matt Cockbain	(substituted off) 55'
RL	5	John Eales (c)
LL	4	David Giffin
TP	3	Andrew Blades
HK	2	Michael Foley	(substituted off) 76'
LP	1	Richard Harry	(substituted off) 70'
Replacements:
CE	16	Nathan Grey	(substituted in) 79'
CE	17	Jason Little	(substituted in) 46'
SH	18	Chris Whitaker	(substituted in) 79'
FL	19	Owen Finegan	(substituted in) 55'
LK	20	Mark Connors
PR	21	Dan Crowley	(substituted in) 70'
HK	22	Jeremy Paul	(substituted in) 76'
Coach:
(Australia) Rod Macqueen

FB	15	Xavier Garbajosa	(substituted off) 68'
RW	14	Philippe Bernat-Salles
OC	13	Richard Dourthe	(substituted off) 75'
IC	12	Émile Ntamack
LW	11	Christophe Dominici
FH	10	Christophe Lamaison
SH	9	Fabien Galthié	(substituted off) 78'
N8	8	Christophe Juillet	(substituted off) 41'
OF	7	Olivier Magne
BF	6	Marc Lievremont	(substituted off) 68'
RL	5	Fabien Pelous
LL	4	Abdelatif Benazzi
TP	3	Franck Tournaire
HK	2	Raphaël Ibañez (c)	(substituted off) 80'
LP	1	Cedric Soulette	(substituted off) 47'
Replacements:
FB	16	Ugo Mola	(substituted in) 68'
FH	17	Stephane Glas	(substituted in) 75'
SH	18	Stéphane Castaignède	(substituted in) 78'
FL	19	Arnaud Costes	(substituted in) 68'
LK	20	Olivier Brouzet	(substituted in) 41'
PR	21	Pieter de Villiers	(substituted in) 47'
HK	22	Marc Dal Maso	(substituted in) 80'
Coach:
(France) Jean-Claude Skrela

== See also ==
- List of Rugby World Cup finals
