= Toutai Kefu =

Australia international rugby union player (born 1974)

- Full name: Rodger Siaosi Toutai Kefu
- Born: 8 April 1974 (age 52) Tonga
- Height: 1.91 m (6 ft 3 in)
- Notable relative(s): Mafileo Kefu (brother); Steve Kefu (brother)

Rugby union career
- Position: Number 8
- Current team: Tonga (head coach)
Senior career
Years	Team	Apps	(Points)
1996–2004	Queensland Reds	103	
2004–2010	Kubota Spears		
- Correct as of 15 May 2023
International career
Years	Team	Apps	(Points)
1997–2003	Australia	60	(50)
2006	Barbarian F.C.	1	(0)
- Correct as of 15 May 2023
Coaching career
- Years: Team
- 2010–2011: Sunshine Coast Stingrays
- 2011–2012: Tonga (assistant)
- 2012–2016: Kubota Spears
- 2016–2023: Tonga
- 2016: Queensland Country
- Correct as of 15 May 2023

Rodger Siaosi Toutai Kefu (born 8 April 1974) is a Tongan-Australian professional rugby union coach and former player who has been coaching the Tonga national team since 2016.

Kefu acquired 60 test caps while primarily playing the position of number eight for Australia. In 2012, he served as the caretaker coach for Tonga and acted as Iona College's assistant. When there was a gap in the international window, Kefu also served as the head coach of Queensland Country in the National Rugby Championship.

== Playing career ==
Big, quick and powerfully built, he was a stand out school boy performer representing at the underage level from Coorparoo State High School. He was selected for the Queensland Reds for the inaugural season of the Super 12 in 1996, aged 21. He made his international test debut for Australia at the age of 23, coming off the bench against South Africa on 23 August during the 1997 Tri Nations Series. Kefu made his first start on his second cap almost a year later. He took over the position of number 8 from fellow Tongan Viliami Ofahengaue in 1998 in Australia's record 76–0 win over England. After helping Australia qualify for the 1999 Rugby World Cup in September 1998, he played a vital role in winning the Webb Ellis Cup for Australia's second time. He played in 4 of their matches, scoring against Romania in the opening game, and playing the full 80 minutes in the final.

Kefu helped Australia to their first ever Tri-nations title in 2000, which saw the Wallabies win their third consecutive Bledisloe Cup title, the first ever time they had done this. In 2001, he helped Australia to their first series win over the British and Irish Lions in over 70 years, playing in all three tests. Later that year he scored the try which beat the All Blacks to retain the Bledisloe Cup, giving his Skipper, John Eales, a perfect send off, as this was his last game for the Wallabies.

After failing to make the 2003 Rugby World Cup squad, Kefu signed with Kubota Spears in the Top League in Japan, leaving the Queensland Reds after earning 103 caps for his state. In the six seasons Kefu was with the Japanese club, Kubota Spears failed to move from the midsection of the table, only getting as high as fifth in the 2009–10 Top League season. Following the 2009–10 season, Kefu retired from playing rugby.

In 2006, Kefu represented the Barbarians, playing against England at Twickenham Stadium, with England winning 46–19.

=== Honours ===
- Rugby World Cup / Webb Ellis Cup
  - Winner: 1999
- Tri Nations Series
  - Winner: 2000, 2001
  - Runner-up: 1998, 1999, 2002, 2003
- Bledisloe Cup
  - Winner: 1998, 1999, 2000, 2001, 2002
- Mandela Challenge Plate
  - Winner: 2000
- Tom Richards Cup
  - Winner: 2001
- Puma Trophy
  - Winner: 2002
- Trophée des Bicentenaires
  - Winner: 1998, 2000, 2002
- Cook Cup
  - Winner: June 1998, Nov 1998, 1999
- Hopetoun Cup
  - Winner: 1998, 2000
- Lansdowne Cup
  - Winner: 1999

== Coaching career ==
In 2010 Kefu became head coach of the Sunshine Coast Stingrays, a team in the Queensland Premier League. In his first season in charge, he led the Stingrays to the Senior Championship title, defeating Gold Coast 37–12 in the final. Kefu continued on to coach the Stingrays, but temporarily left the side in 2011 to take up the role of assistant coach for the Tongan national team in preparation for the 2011 Rugby World Cup. He helped Tonga to second in the 2011 IRB Pacific Nations Cup, their best positioning since the tournament was formed in 2006. It saw Tonga earn their first victory over Fiji since 2008, winning 45–21, their largest winning margin over the Flying Fijians. In addition to this, they beat Samoa 29–19, which was their first victory over Manu Samoa since 2007. Their only loss came to Japan going down narrowly 28–27. During the World Cup, Tonga earned two victories, beating Japan 31–18 and beating France 19–14 for the first time since 1999. However, the two wins were not enough to progress Tonga further in the tournament.

In 2012, following Isitolo Maka resignation as Tongan head coach, Kefu acted as interim head coach for the 2012 IRB Pacific Nations Cup. He guided Tonga to a sole victory, beating Japan in Tokyo 24–20. In September 2012, Mana Otai was named the full coach.

Following his leave from the Tongan national team, Kefu became the head coach of his former club Kubota Spears in Japan. They had dropped to the Eastern A League. He had recruited high-profile players including Kurt Morath and Hoani Matenga, and brought in young Japanese players. Kefu led the team to promotion for the 2013–14 Top League season, and in his second year in charge, he led his side to top of Group 2, though failed to make it past the Wildcard play-offs, after losing to NEC Green Rockets 47–10. Unfortunately, in the 2014–15 Top League season, Kubota Spears finished fifth in their group which meant they played in the Promotion and relegation play-offs. They played Kamaishi Seawaves on 14 February 2015, where they secured a 34–5 victory to remain in the Top League for the 2015–16 Top League season. Following another poor season in 2015/16, Kefu left the club at the end of the season.

In August 2016, just three months after being appointed head coach of Tonga, Kefu was named the head coach of Queensland Country for the 2016 National Rugby Championship in Australia. Kefu was only able to lead his side to a single victory during their campaign, coming against finalist and table leaders New South Wales Country Eagles 40–38. This meant Queensland Country finished bottom of the table on 7 points.

=== Head coach of Tonga ===
On 6 May 2016, Kefu was announced as the Tongan national team's head coach, replacing Mana Otai after Tonga failed to automatically qualify for the 2019 Rugby World Cup due to finishing fourth in their pool at the 2015 Rugby World Cup. Kefu started his reign as Tongan head coach with a 23–18 loss to Fiji, though Tonga did lead the Fijians 15–0 at half time. A week later, he led his side to a 23–20 loss to Georgia, before going down to Samoa 30–10. Tonga finished last in the 2016 World Rugby Pacific Nations Cup, placing them bottom of the table - putting them in a disadvantage ahead of the 2017 tournament, where they will need to win both matches to qualify for the 2019 Rugby World Cup. Kefu gained his first win against Spain during the 2016 end-of-year internationals, where they won 28–13 in the first ever meeting between the two nations. A week later, Tonga defeated the United States 20–17 before going on to win against Tier 1 side Italy 19–17. This was Tonga's first win over Italy since 1999 and their first win over a Tier 1 nation since beating Scotland in 2012.

In June 2017, Kefu named a squad that included 15 uncapped players in an attempt to increase depth in the national team of players playing in elite rugby in various countries. On 16 June, 7 players earned their debut in Tonga's 24–6 loss to Wales at Eden Park. Two weeks late, Kefu led Tonga into their first home game since 2009 - against Samoa in the first round of the 2017 World Rugby Pacific Nations Cup. Despite a late come back from Samoa, Tonga earned their first victory over Samoa (30–26) since 2011, in a game that included 2 further debutantes. The following week saw Fiji down Tonga for the sixth consecutive time, losing 14–10. Tonga had a promising starts to the End-of-year tour, narrowly losing to invitational side Barbarians, 27–24, in the first ever match between the two sides. Unfortunately, they were unable to continue their form from that match in to their second match on tour, losing to Japan 39–6, a record defeat for the Tongan's against Japan. Tonga's third match on tour ended in a victory, defeating Romania 25–20.

The 2018 World Rugby Pacific Nations Cup saw Tonga maintain their position as the second ranked Pacific Nation behind Fiji. In the opening round of the PNC, Tonga lost to newly invited Georgia 16–15, but went onto to defeat Samoa 28–18 in round 2. Despite there only being two rounds of the PNC, Tonga later went onto to beat Fiji in Lautoka 27–19, in a one-off test match - it was the first time since 2011 that Tonga had defeated Fiji in Fiji. The start of the World Cup year saw Tonga finish in fifth place during the 2019 World Rugby Pacific Nations Cup, winning just once, beating Canada 33–23, before later going onto to secure just one victory during the 2019 Rugby World Cup; defeating USA 31–19 in the final game of the pool.

Due the COVID-19 pandemic, Tonga didn't next play until 2021, which commenced with a 102–0 defeat to New Zealand, followed by back-to-back losses to Samoa during the opening phases of the 2023 Rugby World Cup – Oceania qualification. They secured their first win against the Cook Islands by the end of July, seeing them advance to a play-off match against Hong Kong in 2022. Tonga won that game 44–22 to see the ʻIkale Tahi qualify for the 2023 Rugby World Cup.

In November 2022, Kefu led Tonga to their first undefeated November tour, beating Spain, Chile and Uruguay, but their form struggled leading into the 2023 Rugby World Cup, finishing last in the 2023 World Rugby Pacific Nations Cup ahead of the tournament. During the World Cup, like 4 years earlier, Tonga only gained one victory (in the last round), coming against Romania 45–24.

After the tournament, Kefu stood down as head coach of Tonga, becoming the longest standing head coach in history of the Tongan national side (7 years) - previously New Zealander David Mullins who coached for five years between 1969 and 1974.

==== Honours ====
- World Rugby Pacific Nations Cup
  - Runners-up: 2017, 2018

== Personal life ==
Kefu's is the son of Fatai Kefu, a member of the Tongan team that caused a huge upset by beating the Wallabies at Ballymore in 1973.

Kefu is married to his wife Rachel and they have an adult son and daughter and live in Coorparoo, a suburb of Brisbane.

On 16 August 2021 Kefu and his family were allegedly the victims of a violent home invasion in which all four family members were seriously injured and required surgery. Reportedly the Kefus were at home when three people broke in and a brawl erupted during which Kefu was stabbed in the liver and abdomen. Kefu told reporters that his son showed no fear as he helped him to fight off two of the alleged attackers. “He absolutely went into beast mode,” Kefu said. A 15-year-old male was charged with four counts of attempted murder, three counts of assault causing grievous bodily harm and one count each of unlawful use of a motor vehicle, breaking and entering, burglary and deprivation of liberty. This prompted statements of support from the rugby community both in Australia and overseas.

Sporting positions
Preceded by (New Zealand) Isitolo Maka	Tonga national rugby union team coach (caretaker); 2012	Succeeded by (Tonga) Mana Otai
Preceded by (Tonga) Mana Otai	Tonga national rugby union team coach 2016–2023	Succeeded by (Tonga) Tevita Tuʻifua
