= Adam Leach =

Australian rugby union player

- Full name: Adam Charles Leach
- Born: 24 November 1971 (age 54) Corowa, NSW, Australia
- Height: 6 ft 2 in (188 cm)
- Weight: 216 lb (98 kg)

Rugby union career
- Position: Back-row
Senior career
Years	Team	Apps	(Points)
1997–2000	Harlequins	52	(30)
Super Rugby
Years	Team	Apps	(Points)
1997	Waratahs	1	(0)
Coaching career
- Years: Team
- 2006–2007: Tonga

Adam Charles Leach (born 24 November 1971) is an Australian former professional rugby union player.

Born in Corowa, Leach was a flanker and won the 1997 AAMI Medal for the best player in Sydney first-grade, while captaining Eastwood. He appeared for the New South Wales Waratahs against the Chiefs in the opening round of the 1997 Super 12 season, then was restricted to the bench for the remaining fixtures. After his Waratahs contract was not renewed, Leach continued his career in England with Harlequins.

Leach succeeded Viliami Ofahengaue as Tonga head coach in 2006 and steered the team to a place in the 2007 Rugby World Cup, though he resigned prior to the tournament over frustration with administrators.
