= Ollie le Roux =

South Africa international rugby union player

- Full name: Andre-Henri le Roux
- Born: 10 May 1973 (age 53) Fort Beaufort, South Africa
- Height: 1.83 m (6 ft 0 in)
- Weight: 150 kg (23 st 9 lb; 331 lb)
- School: Grey College

Rugby union career
- Position: Prop
Senior career
Years	Team	Apps	(Points)
1993–1994	Free State	22	(20)
1995–2003	Sharks (Currie Cup)	100	
1996–2003	Sharks	84	
2005	Cats	3	(0)
2005–2007	Free State Cheetahs	25	(5)
2006–2007	Cheetahs	20	(5)
2007–2009	Leinster	19	(20)
International career
Years	Team	Apps	(Points)
1994–2002	South Africa	54	(5)

Andre-Henri "Ollie" le Roux (born 10 May 1973) is a South African rugby union footballer with 54 caps for his country.

== Rugby career ==
Le Roux was born in Fort Beaufort, Eastern Cape. In his professional club rugby career he has played for: the Sharks, Durban, Free State Cheetahs, Cheetahs, Bloemfontein, Leinster and the Stormers. He has also played invitational rugby for the Barbarians.

Le Roux made his international debut for the Springboks against England in 1994 and won 54 Springbok caps. He holds the record as the youngest prop forward to ever play for South Africa.

He became a crowd favourite on joining Leinster. He was part of their Celtic League success in 2008. Despite Le Roux's large size – 6' (1.8m) and 136 kilograms (or 21 st 7 lbs/ 301 lbs) his work rate around the field is top drawer.

== Retirement ==
Now retired, the chicken farming entrepreneur recently completed an Ironman triathlon. He lives in Bloemfontein with his wife Mariska and their four daughters Mia, Chloe, Donna and Lisa. He currently is part of the Optimum Financial Services group

== Honours ==
South Africa

- Tri Nations: 1998

Sharks

- Currie Cup: 1992

Free State Cheetahs

- Currie Cup: 2005, 2006 (shared), 2007 (Le Roux did not feature in final)

Leinster

- Celtic League: 2008

== See also ==
- List of South Africa national rugby union players – Springbok no. 600
