= Krynauw Otto =

South African rugby union footballer

- Born: 8 October 1971 (age 55) Belfast, Mpumalanga, South Africa
- Height: 2.00 m (6 ft 7 in)
- Weight: 117 kg (258 lb)
- School: Witbank Technical High School

Rugby union career
- Position: Lock
Provincial / State sides
Years	Team	Apps	(Points)
1990	South Eastern Transvaal	3	
1993–1999	Northern Transvaal	87	
Super Rugby
Years	Team	Apps	(Points)
1998–2000	Bulls	47	(10)
International career
Years	Team	Apps	(Points)
1995–2000	South Africa	38	(5)

Krynauw Otto (born 8 October 1971) is a South African former professional rugby union player who played as a lock.

== Playing career ==
=== Provincial ===
Otto made his provincial debut as a nineteen-year-old, for South Eastern Transvaal in 1990. He then moved to Northern Transvaal, playing for the under-20 side and in 1993, made his debut for the senior side. He was a member of the Blue Bulls team that won the Currie Cup in 1998.

=== International ===
Otto made his debut for the South African national team in the 1995 Rugby World Cup against Romania at Newlands in Cape Town and went on to play 38 tests.

He was part of the 1998 Springbok team that won the Tri-Nations and a member of the 1999 World Cup squad that finished third in the tournament.

Otto retired at the age of 28 after medical examinations revealed a subdural haematoma in the left frontal area of his brain, incurred during a match against Australia on 8 July 2000.

=== Test history ===
No.	Opposition	Result (SA 1st)	Position	Tries	Date	Venue
1.	Romania	21–8	Lock		30 May 1995	Newlands, Cape Town
2.	Canada	20–0	Substitute		3 Jun 1995	Boet Erasmus Stadium, Port Elizabeth
3.	Samoa	42–14	Substitute		10 Jun 1995	Ellis Park, Johannesburg
4.	(British & Irish Lions) British Lions	35–16	Lock		5 Jul 1997	Ellis Park, Johannesburg
5.	New Zealand	32–35	Lock		19 Jul 1997	Ellis Park, Johannesburg
6.	Australia	20–32	Lock		2 Aug 1997	Suncorp Stadium, Brisbane
7.	New Zealand	35–55	Lock		9 Aug 1997	Eden Park, Auckland
8.	Italy	61–31	Lock		8 Nov 1997	Dall'Ara Stadium, Bologna
9.	France	36–32	Lock		15 Nov 1997	Stade de Gerland, Lyon
10.	France	52–10	Lock		22 Nov 1997	Parc des Princes, Paris
11.	England	29–11	Lock		29 Nov 1997	Twickenham, London
12.	Scotland	68–10	Lock		6 Dec 1997	Murrayfield, Edinburgh
13.	Ireland	37–13	Lock		13 Jun 1998	Free State Stadium, Bloemfontein
14.	Ireland	33–0	Lock		20 Jun 1998	Loftus Versfeld, Pretoria
15.	Wales	96–13	Lock	1	27 Jun 1998	Loftus Versfeld, Pretoria
16.	England	18–0	Lock		4 Jul 1998	Newlands, Cape Town
17.	Australia	14–13	Lock		18 Jul 1998	Subiaco Oval, Perth
18.	New Zealand	13–3	Lock		25 Jul 1998	Athletic Park, Wellington
19.	New Zealand	24–23	Lock		15 Aug 1998	Kings Park, Durban
20.	Australia	29–15	Lock		22 Aug 1998	Ellis Park, Johannesburg
21.	Wales	28–20	Lock		14 Nov 1998	Wembley, London
22.	Scotland	35–10	Lock		21 Nov 1998	Murrayfield, Edinburgh
23.	Ireland	27–13	Lock		28 Nov 1998	Lansdowne Road, Dublin
24.	England	7–13	Lock		5 Dec 1998	Twickenham, London
25.	Italy	74–3	Lock		12 Jun 1999	Boet Erasmus Stadium, Port Elizabeth
26.	Wales	19–29	Lock		26 Jun 1998	Millennium Stadium, Cardiff
27.	New Zealand	0–28	Lock		10 Jul 1999	Carisbrook, Dunedin
28.	Australia	6–32	Lock		17 Jul 1999	Suncorp Stadium, Brisbane
29.	Scotland	46–29	Substitute		3 Oct 1999	Murrayfield, Edinburgh
30.	Spain	47–3	Lock		10 Oct 1999	Murrayfield, Edinburgh
31.	Uruguay	39–3	Lock		15 Oct 1999	Hampden Park, Glasgow
32.	England	44–21	Lock		24 Oct 1999	Stade de France, Paris
33.	Australia	21–27	Lock		30 Oct 1999	Twickenham, London
34.	New Zealand	22–18	Lock		4 Nov 1999	Millennium Stadium, Cardiff
35.	Canada	51–18	Lock		10 Jun 2000	Basil Kenyon Stadium, East London
36.	England	18–13	Lock		17 Jun 2000	Loftus Versfeld, Pretoria
37.	England	22–27	Lock		24 Jun 2000	Free State Stadium, Bloemfontein
38.	Australia	23–44	Lock		8 Jul 2000	Colonial Stadium, Melbourne

== Accolades ==
In 1993, Otto was nominated one of the five most Promising Players of the Year (under-23), along with FP Naude, Ryno Opperman, Christiaan Scholtz and Johan Roux.

== See also ==
- List of South Africa national rugby union players – Springbok no. 615
