= Matt Burke (rugby union, born 1973) =

Australian rugby union player (born 1973)

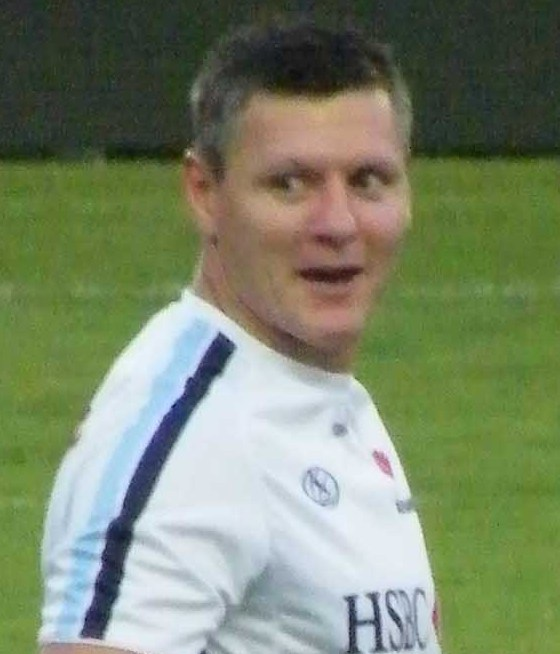
- Born: Matthew Coleman Burke; 26 March 1973 (age 53) Sydney
- Height: 184 cm (6 ft 0 in)
- Weight: 97 kg (15 st 4 lb)
- School: St. Joseph's College

Rugby union career
- Position: Fullback
- Correct as of 2 November 2007
Senior career
Years	Team	Apps	(Points)
1990–96	Eastwood	58	(373)
2004–08	Newcastle Falcons	59	(288)
- Correct as of 10 July 2014
Provincial / State sides
Years	Team	Apps	(Points)
1993–04	New South Wales Waratahs	115	(1172)
- Correct as of 10 July 2014
Super Rugby
Years	Team	Apps	(Points)
1996–04	New South Wales Waratahs	78	(959)
- Correct as of 10 July 2014
International career
Years	Team	Apps	(Points)
1993–04	Australia	81	(878)
1990–91	Australian Schoolboys	5	
- Correct as of 21 August 2004
National sevens team
Years	Team		Comps
1993	Australia		1
- Correct as of 10 July 2014

Matthew Coleman Burke (born 26 March 1973) is an Australian former international rugby union player who is currently a rugby commentator for Stan Sport and Channel Nine.

Burke was a goalkicker and regular try-scorer for the Wallabies who contributed to the team's victories in the 1999 Rugby World Cup, multiple Bledisloe Cups and Australia's sole test series win against the British & Irish Lions in 2001.

When he retired from international rugby in 2004 he was the leading points scorer in the multinational Super Rugby Competition. He is the most-capped fullback and the second highest scorer for Australia in Test rugby.

== Early life ==
Burke grew up in Carlingford, New South Wales, and attended at St Gerard Majella Catholic Primary School, Carlingford and St. Joseph's College, Hunters Hill. He was selected for the Australian Schoolboys team in 1990 and toured with the teams to the United Kingdom and Ireland. He played his club rugby with Eastwood and maintained his association with the club throughout his career.

== Rugby career ==
Burke progressed to the Australian Under 21s team in 1992 and 1993 at the same time as playing at the Hong Kong Sevens in 1992 and the Rugby World Cup Sevens in 1993. He made his Test debut in 1993 when he played in the third Test against the South African Springboks.

=== Bledisloe Cup and early Wallabies years ===
In the national team for two years as the starting fullback and goal-kicker, Burke gained early attention for scoring arguably one of the most impressive tries in Bledisloe Cup history during the second match of the 1996 tournament, held on 27 July at Brisbane's Lang Park. After gathering a low pass from felled teammate Richard Tombs (from a standing start from his own 22-metre line), Burke dodged a total of six defenders culminating with a 'dummy pass' to another teammate Ben Tune – allowing him to cover approximately 75 metres to score a try. The try put Australia ahead 16–9 at half time. Whilst the All Blacks would win with a last minute try to Frank Bunce – this game is particularly remembered for Burke's try.

He just carved up through the middle and nobody touched him between there and the line. To me, it was probably the single most special moment of Bledisloe Cup games that I know – to see that young man score

— Chris 'Buddha' Handy, Former player and rugby commentator

In 1997, Burke was excluded from the Wallabies by a groin strain suffered during the domestic season and he was temporarily replaced by Stephen Larkham; then also a goal-kicking fullback. However he returned in time for the first Bledisloe Cup match in 1998, at the Melbourne Cricket Ground where he scored all 24 (2 tries, 1 conversion and 4 penalties) of the Wallabies points against New Zealand. It is an individual point-scoring world record against the All Blacks – which still stands. Australia had not beaten the All Blacks for four years in a single game up to that point and this heralded not only an Australian comeback, but an unprecedented five-year domination of the tournament.

=== Goal-kicking and shoulder injury ===
Burke was considered one of the finest test goal-kickers of his day – second, perhaps, to contemporary rival New Zealand kicker Andrew Mehrtens. At a time before it became common in test rugby, Burke was one of the few goal-kickers able to take successful penalty attempts from beyond the half-way line. Yet he was known to have clusters of missed goal-kicking attempts. In the third match of the 1998 Bledisloe Cup, he missed three straightforward kicking attempts in the first half – before being relieved of kicking duties under instruction from Australian Captain John Eales in the second half (being in fact relieved of the goal-kicking by Eales himself). In the dying minutes of that particular march, he gained some measure of redemption by scoring a match-winning try but was also afflicted by a serious shoulder injury (Note: He was rolled onto his shoulder whilst landing just over the try-line by desperate New Zealand tackler Christian Cullen) – sidelining him for the better part of the next year.

=== Rugby World Cup 1999 ===
After undergoing surgery on the affected shoulder, Burke delayed his comeback to the domestic Rugby season, in an attempt to right himself for the 1999 Rugby World Cup. As a result, Burke faced some criticism for NSW's subsequent poor performance in the Super 12 competition that year and also caused tension between himself and NSW Coach Matt Williams. (Note: Williams had in fact been a schoolteacher of Burke, years earlier) At test level, he was being relieved by emerging rival Chris Latham, at the fullback position. Despite making it back in the squad in time to contribute to the 1999 Rugby World Cup victory, it has been speculated that this injury affected his counter-attacking playing style and future fitness.

As part of the campaign to "Bring back Bill", (Note: This was the media campaign to regain the Rugby World Cup, known as the William Webb Ellis Cup after the sport's mythical founder, which Australia had last won in 1991) as the starting Wallaby fullback and primary goal-kicker in the 1999 Rugby World Cup, he scored the majority of Australia's points in the last two games to help secure victory – 24 points against South Africa in the Rugby World Cup semi-final and 25 points against France in the grand final. Earlier in 1999, in an echo of the previous year at the MCG, he individually kicked 23 (1 conversion and 7 penalties) points against the All Blacks at Stadium Australia.

=== Selection battles with Chris Latham ===
After the 1999 World Cup, Burke had become plagued by ongoing injuries which were severely limiting his recovery and return to form. While his goal kicking and fairly regular try-scoring had saved Australia in many games; his injuries would soon take their toll. (Note: Burke never regained full function in his injured shoulder and in 2000 he suffered an injury to his ankle. Initially he remained in the national team, but was replaced by Stirling Mortlock in kicking duties. He eventually required an operation, being replaced at fullback by Chris Latham for the rest of the 2000 season.) Queensland Reds fullback Chris Latham was soon competing with him for Wallabies selection and Latham was the favoured Australian fullback in the 2000 Bledisloe Cup. (Note: Latham, whilst originally from Northern NSW, had moved to Queensland to play for the Queensland Reds to further his rugby career due to Burke's incumbency at NSW) This began the twilight phase of Burke's career where he was switched between various back-line positions before intermittently being recalled to starting fullback. Latham, who had performed strongly at Super Rugby level began his test career with many costly defensive errors at fullback in 2000 and 2001– which initially helped to preserve Burke's place at the number 15 jersey.

=== Lions series 2001 ===
Burke regained his starting fullback position for the Wallabies in the second test of the 2001 British & Irish Lions tour to Australia, after Latham was dropped for a poor performance in the first game of the series. This was Burke's first start in the number 15 jersey since the 1999 Rugby World Cup and he ended-up playing a starring role in the Australian comeback in the final two games. In the deciding third game, both sides drew on tries and conversions but his five penalties against three by future Newcastle Falcons teammate Jonny Wilkinson left the hosts 29–23 winners at Sydney's Stadium Australia. To date, it is the only Australian series victory over the combined multi-nation British Lions. He was also part of the Wallabies team which beat the New Zealand All-blacks for the first time in 2001 at their traditional stronghold at Carisbrook, Dunedin.

=== Positional switch to outside centre ===
Burke was made to switch positions when playing for the Wallabies for most of the remainder of his career – at first to wing, and then to outside centre during a period of continual experimentation with the Wallabies back-line. This was initially done to accommodate both Chris Latham at test level, (Note: Latham having earlier been trialled at wing as well over the 2000–2001 period.) and for newly converted former professional rugby league footballer Mat Rogers at the state level for the NSW Waratahs (Rogers later playing fullback for the Wallabies as well while Latham was either benched or playing at wing). (Note: 'Rogers had made it clear to Bob Dwyer and the coaching staff he wanted to play fullback' – M. Burke. A Rugby Life (2006).) Burke was considered versatile enough to satisfactorily fulfill these roles whilst now primarily considered a specialist kicker. Many commentators said that he was restricted from playing more freely in a counter-attacking role, while not in his favoured fullback position. Burke himself has stated that he always considered himself a fullback and that the decision to switch him to outside centre was a mistake. (Note: "I never thought of myself as a jack-of-trades in the game, yet down the years that's pretty much the way it turned out....Probably I should have stayed at fullback the whole time and just contested that position... – (Matt Burke (2006). Matthew Burke: A Rugby Life. Sydney: Pan Macmillan Publishing. p52)) (Note: "I would have preferred to stay at fullback. After all, I hadn't played number 13 since 1995. But I understood the decision had probably already been made. Whatever the reasons behind it – whether it was part of an agreed deal when Rogers had signed – it had been decided" – (Matt Burke (2006). Matthew Burke: A Rugby Life. Sydney: Pan Macmillan Publishing. p249))

Complicating matters for national selectors, the Australian National Rugby Team now became saturated with a flurry of traded National Rugby League 'convert' players ready to replace ageing back-line first generation professional players such as Burke (Rugby Union was only made a professional sport in 1996 (Note: Rugby Union, which distinguished itself from league over this issue in the early 1900s, was previously manned with dedicated amateurs up to the top level until professionalism in 1996 enabled top-tier (such as test rugby) players to get paid.)). Burke was otherwise retained as vice-captain and goal-kicker for the 2002 season. That year, he famously kicked a penalty after full-time to win the Bledisloe Cup in windy conditions at Stadium Australia – one of the last times his influence was crucial to the outcome of a match (and incidentally, the last time Australia held the Bledisloe Cup as of 2024).

=== Rugby World Cup 2003 ===
In 2003 he was given back the starting fullback position, one last time – but ultimately did not perform well enough to retain it. Midway through the 2003 Rugby World Cup he was axed from the starting line-up following a narrow pool win over Ireland (17–16); a match in which he was substituted after 64 minutes. He was replaced by former professional rugby league footballer Mat Rogers, which drew mixed reactions and he would be relegated to the bench for the rest of his test career. By this time Mat Rogers was already the starting goal-kicker (after being brought on the field as a substitute in the world cup pool game against Namibia, Burke was signaled that Rogers was to continue as primary kicker by the coaching staff after attempting to take the ball from him for an attempt at goal (Note: This match is notable for the 142–0 world record scoreline – of which Roger's 42 points is an individual record for points in any test match – a record previously held by Matt Burke. When later writing a newspaper match report, he reflected on why Burke had attempted to take the ball from him for goal-kicking at one point in the match. Rogers stated that he assumed it was a force of habit as opposed to an attempt by Burke to stop his record from being broken. Burke, however in his autobiography, later clarified that Rogers had previously agreed that when Burke was off the bench – he was still to be the primary goal kicker. This informal deal was essentially stifled by the coaching staff that day and helped to signal to Burke that he was now completely supplanted in the Australian team.)) and he, along with Chris Latham, had finally emerged as the two preferred fullbacks. Future wallabies captain Stirling Mortlock had also simultaneously become the leading outside centre. Further diminishing the ageing Burke's place on the team was that there were now at least four other recognised goal-kickers in the team – Mortlock, Rogers, Matt Giteau and Elton Flatley – who all admirably performed as replacements to Burke. However Australia, to date, has never again had a regular goal kicker with a similar tenure.

=== Final year with the Waratahs ===
In 2004, any hope of rekindling his international career was over when he was controversially completely dropped from his state team, the NSW Waratahs. While he was injured early in that Super 12 season – he still managed to score 62 points from his first six games; placing him ahead of Andrew Mehrtens in the all-time points lead of the Super 12 (now Super Rugby) competition. Yet 'inconsistent performance' was cited as the key reason behind the axing. Others have speculated his age as the reason for Burke's dumping – this is questionable considering NSW simultaneously attempted to 'convert' footballer Andrew Johns from rival code league, despite Johns' and Burke's similar ages. (Note: Burke, as captain of NSW, had come under some criticism himself for endorsing the pursuit of Andrew Johns when both he and Johns have the same manager – John Fordham.) NSW Coach (and former NSW and Australian teammate) Ewen McKenzie's decision to drop Burke drew ire from many in the union fraternity, including Phil Kearns and Simon Poidevin, who accused McKenzie of disloyalty and being shortsighted.

In a sign of continued bad blood between the two, McKenzie would later ridicule suggestions that Burke would be recalled to the Australian Wallabies in 2007 (see below); describing it as return of the "superannuation crew". Burke responded by deriding McKenzie's apparent "ignorance of British Club Football" – where he was playing at that time. However, Burke would later endorse McKenzie for Wallabies coach prior to his appointment in late 2013.

Despite his expected retirement, Australian Coach Eddie Jones described Burke's axing from the NSW squad as an "independent event" – indicating some use for Burke at test level. Indeed, Burke did appear intermittently as a substitute in various roles, including fullback, for the Wallabies in the 2004 season. He played his last international test for the Wallabies on 21 August 2004 against South Africa, coming off the bench for the final six minutes – where he missed a penalty attempt (Australia lost 23 – 19). In 2006, in his last international appearance, he was starting fullback for the World XV Rugby team against the South African Springboks for their first 2006 game – contributing 17 points (5 pen, 1 con) in their 27 to 30 points loss.

=== Playing in England ===
After losing his Super Rugby playing contract with the NSW Waratahs, Burke was offered contracts by eight different clubs – including other teams in the Super Rugby competition. Interested teams reportedly included the Queensland Reds and teams in New Zealand, South Africa, Italy, France and England. Wallaby coach Eddie Jones also kept the door open for further test duty depending on the availability/fitness of certain players for the Wallabies tour of the UK in late 2004, but Burke contradicted this statement by confirming his retirement and stating it was unlikely that he would play test rugby again.

Burke joined the Newcastle Falcons in the English Premiership. Here he has played alongside former English rival Jonny Wilkinson (his opposite kicker in Lions tour of Australia). He has also won the 'Player of the Year' at the Falcons and was named as captain of the side. In February 2007, he obtained a British passport (while retaining Australian citizenship), qualifying through his England-born mother. His main reason for doing so was Guinness Premiership regulations prohibiting teams from having more than one non-European Union citizen on the field at any time. This enabled the Falcons to play him at the same time as New Zealand prop Joe McDonnell.

In 2007, there was again brief speculation that Burke would return as starting fullback for the Wallabies in the Tri-nations and Bledisloe Cup tournament; which would lead up to the world cup. Chris Latham was recovering from knee reconstruction and Mat Rogers had since returned to Rugby League. He was even formally approached by new Wallabies coach John Connolly regarding his availability for that season. Burke rejected this, citing commitments to his Newcastle side in the UK – but did state he would consider another approach regarding the 2007 Rugby World Cup. Burke was not ultimately approached, as Latham had sufficiently recovered. (Note: Latham had in fact criticised the choice of an aging Burke to replace him, stating his support for local talent. Some speculated that this was due to "selfish motives". Burke had explicitly stated in his autobiography that he and Latham had always maintained a cordial, if competitive relationship during their careers.) Had Burke come back to play for Australia – it would have set a new precedent as the ARU have stood firm in only considering Australia-based talent for Test selection since the game went professional in 1996. (Note: For this reason, players would go overseas to play in other (more lucrative) club competitions only after they had finished their international career. This is similar to the stance taken by NZ Rugby in response to professionalism to stem a drain of local talent to northern hemisphere competitions (such as France – where player contracts are more generous and have been longstanding prior to the 1996 changes))

=== Retirement ===
In May 2008 Burke announced his immediate retirement from playing after failing to recover from a torn anterior cruciate ligament in his knee suffered the previous October.

== Legacy in the game ==
Owing to Matt Burke's lasting impact in the New South Wales jersey, the Waratahs' Player of the Year is now awarded the Matt Burke Trophy.

In addition to being a leading fullback and playing with the Wallabies for over a decade, Burke's third year as New South Wales Waratahs captain saw him become the first player in the history of Waratah rugby to play over 100 games.

Burke is still Australia's most capped fullback, having played 54 of his 81 Tests in that position. After breaking 1000 career points for NSW in 2003, he has scored 878 Test points for Australia. In Bledisloe Cup contests, he still holds the individual record for total test points against New Zealand (176 points in 17 Tests).

Burke was voted starting fullback in the Wallaby Team of the Decade which celebrated the first ten years of professional rugby union, spanning 1996 to 2005.

Burke was inducted into the World Rugby Hall of Fame in 2025.

== Post-rugby sports and media career ==
Since his retirement, Burke has opened a sports business that specialises in skills sessions for children. In early 2013, Burke joined Network Ten's coverage of the 2013 British & Irish Lions tour to Australia, and is an expert commentator for Australia's coverage of the 2013 Rugby Championship.

In October 2013, Burke was appointed as sport presenter on 10 News in Sydney, after Brad McEwan moved to Melbourne to present sport for 10 News. Between September 2020 and September 2024, Burke also presented sport on the Brisbane bulletin, following a major restructure of 10's news brand.

In October 2024, it was announced that Burke would depart Network 10 at the end of the year. He was replaced as the sports presenter on the now-standalone Sydney bulletin by Tara Rushton.

In February 2025, Burke joined Stan Sport as an expert commentator for its coverage of the Super Rugby Pacific competition and Wallabies Tests.

== Honours ==
- Held 22 Australian Rugby records and 7 International records when he retired
  - Most test points in a calendar year (189 points: 6 tries, 27 conversions, 35 penalty goals – 1996)
  - Most test points against NZ in one match (24 points – 1998)
  - Most test points against the British Lions in one match (25 points – 2001)
  - Most test points against England in one match(22 points – 1998)
  - Most test points against France in one match (25 points – 1999 Rugby World Cup Final)
- Was the 4th highest international points scorer at time of retirement—see List of leading Rugby union Test point scorers
- Twentieth most capped international of all time at the time of his retirement
- World XV team (2006)
- Rugby World Cup Win – Australia (1999)
- Barbarians (1999, 2001, 2003, 2004, 2005)
- Wallaby of the Year (1996)
- Sydney Morning Herald Player of the Year (1996, 98)
