= Isitolo Maka =

Former New Zealand rugby union footballer

- Born: 25 May 1975 (age 51)
- Height: 6 ft 2 in (1.88 m)
- Weight: 275 lb (125 kg)
- Notable relative: Finau Maka (brother)

Rugby union career
- Position: Number 8
Amateur team(s)
Years	Team	Apps	(Points)
- Whitsunday Raiders
Senior career
Years	Team	Apps	(Points)
1995-1996	Blues		
1996-2000	Highlanders		
2000	Chiefs		
2000-2006	Toulouse		
2006-2009	Marseille Vitrolles Rugby		
International career
Years	Team	Apps	(Points)
1998	All Blacks	4	(5)

Isitolo Maka (born 25 May 1975) is a former rugby union footballer for the All Blacks playing as a number 8 and making four appearances, all in 1998. Maka was the coach of the Tonga squad at the 2011 Rugby World Cup.

Whilst at Toulouse he helped them win the 2005 Heineken Cup, featuring as a replacement in the final.

Sporting positions
Preceded by (Tonga) Quddus Fielea	Tonga National Rugby Union Coach; 2010-2011	Succeeded by (Australia) Toutai Kefu (caretaker)
