= Mark Hammett =

New Zealand rugby union player and coach

- Born: Mark Garry Hammett; 13 July 1972 (age 54) Christchurch, New Zealand
- Height: 1.85 m (6 ft 1 in)
- Weight: 107 kg (16 st 12 lb)
- School: St Thomas of Canterbury College

Rugby union career
- Position: Hooker
Amateur team(s)
| Years | Team | Apps | (Points) |
- Marist Albion
Provincial / State sides
| Years | Team | Apps | (Points) |
| 1992–03 | Canterbury | 76 | (45) |
Super Rugby
| Years | Team | Apps | (Points) |
| 1996–03 | Crusaders | 81 | (35) |
International career
| Years | Team | Apps | (Points) |
| 1999–03 | New Zealand | 29 | (15) |
Coaching career
- Years: Team
- 2006: Crusaders (Forwards coach)
- 2006: Canterbury (Forwards coach)
- 2007–10: Crusaders (Asst. Coach)
- 2011–14: Hurricanes
- 2014–15: Cardiff Blues (Director of Rugby)
- 2016: Sunwolves
- 2016: Japan (Caretaker)
- 2016–: Tasman Makos (Asst. Coach)
- 2017–: Highlanders (Asst. Coach)
- Correct as of 17 July 2016

Mark Garry 'Hammer' Hammett (born 13 July 1972) is a New Zealand rugby union coach and former player. Having represented Canterbury provincially 76 times, and the Crusaders 81 times and the All Blacks 30 times – including 29 Test matches, Hammett later went on to coach both Canterbury and Crusaders as a forwards/assistant coach. He is currently on the assistant coach of the Highlanders in Super Rugby and the Tasman Makos in the Mitre 10 Cup.

== Playing career ==
=== Early career: 1989–97 ===
Hammett first represented New Zealand, while he was a pupil at St Thomas of Canterbury College, when selected for the New Zealand Under 17 team in 1989. He then captained the Under 19 team in 1991, before making his first appearance for Canterbury in 1992. Although his one game for Canterbury in 1992 was as a replacement, he played seven games the following season. As hooker, he played mainly as backup to Matt Sexton in 1993; however, by 1994 they were sharing the role. By 1995, Hammett played more games than Sexton.

Rugby turned professional in late 1995, and in 1996 the Canterbury Crusaders (now called the Crusaders) franchise was established. Hammett became a founding member of the side, which struggled in the inaugural Super 12, finishing in last place. The 1997 season went better for Hammett; the Crusaders finished sixth, and the Canterbury provincial team won the National Provincial Championship (NPC) after beating Counties in the final. Although Hammett was receiving more and more game time, he still only participated in the NPC final as a replacement.

=== Super 12 success: 1998–2001 ===
Hammett started regularly for both Canterbury, and the Crusaders in 1998, with the latter he won his first Super 12 title. The 1998 Super 12 final was played against the Blues at Eden Park; Hammett said of the match "If we'd been polled in that week, and had to give an honest answer, most of the boys, deep down, would probably have thought that the Blues would beat us." Despite this, the Crusaders defeated the reigning champions 20–13. Hammett was rewarded with a New Zealand trial, where he captained his team. He was subsequently selected for New Zealand A and played against Tonga.

The Crusaders achieved more success in 1999 as they finished the round-robin in fourth place, then won their semi-final, and final (both away from home) to take another championship. Hammett's achievements with the Crusaders were rewarded by being called into the All Blacks in 1999, at the age of 26. His first game was against New Zealand 'A', on 11 June in Christchurch, quickly followed by his first Test against France on 26 June. Hammett eventually played in the 1999 Tri Nations Series, and was selected for the 1999 Rugby World Cup.

After winning a third title with the Crusaders in 2000, he was again selected for the All Blacks; getting a start against Tonga, and in that years Tri-Nations. After returning from All Blacks duty, he played for Canterbury and contributed to a Ranfurly Shield win over Waitako. Canterbury then reached the NPC final, giving Hammett the opportunity to be part of a Super 12, Ranfurly Shield, and NPC winning team, all in the same year. Wellington won the NPC final however, and the opportunity was lost. Hammett was then selected for the end-of-year All Blacks tour, and played against France and Italy (both as a substitute).

Hammett's 2001 Super 12 season was marred by a shoulder injury, and the Crusaders eventually finished tenth. Due to injury, Hammett only played one game for the All Blacks, as a substitute against Argentina in June. He missed the entire NPC campaign due to injury: an ankle problem which required surgery and causes him to also miss the 2001 end-of-year All Black tour.

=== Final seasons: 2002–03 ===
After the 2001 NPC, Crusaders' captain Todd Blackadder left New Zealand to play rugby in Scotland. During the 2002 Super 12 pre-season, half-back Justin Marshall questioned which of the senior players were going to step into Blackadder's leadership role for the tough matches. Hammett took the comment "as a slap in the face", as "one player doesn't make a team." Hammett later said "I took it that way, and I think a lot of the others must have as well, because we all ended up stepping up!" Subsequently, the Crusaders went through the season unbeaten, including a 96–19 victory over the New South Wales Waratahs. He again played for the All Blacks in 2002, starting against Australia and South Africa in the Tri-Nations. The 2002 NPC season was Hammett's last, and although Canterbury were knocked out in their semi-final, they managed to retain the Ranfurly Shield. Hammett's last match was his 76th for Canterbury.

The 2003 Super 12 season was Hammett's last. The team ended the round-robin second on the table, and eventually travelled to Eden Park to face the Blues in the final. Although the Crusaders lost the final, Hammett scored two tries, becoming one of only three players to score two tries in a Super 12 final. Despite the two tries, Hammett calls the match the biggest disappointment of his career. Hammett was again chosen for the All Blacks, and eventually played in the 2003 Rugby World Cup. The All Blacks call-up made Hammett reconsider his retirement plans. He planned to continue playing after 2003, however a neck injury during the 2004 pre-season ended his playing career.

=== Honours ===
New Zealand

- Rugby World Cup / Webb Ellis Cup
  - Third: 2003
  - Fourth: 1999
- Tri Nations
  - Winners: 1999, 2002, 2003
  - Runners-up: 2000, 2001
- Bledisloe Cup
  - Winners: 2003
- Dave Gallaher Trophy
  - Winners: 2000

Crusaders

- Super 12
  - Winners: 1998, 1999, 2000, 2002
  - Runners-up: 2003

Canterbury

- National Provincial Championship
  - Winners: 1997, 2001
  - Runners-up: 2000

== Coaching career ==
=== In New Zealand: 2006–2014 ===
Two years after his playing career ended with the Crusaders, Hammett was back with the Crusaders, working as a forwards coaching adviser for the 2006 Super 14 season. He went on to fulfill the same role for Canterbury in the 2006 Air New Zealand Cup. He was later appointed as the new Crusaders assistant coach in November 2006 as a replacement for Vern Cotter who departed to France. Hammett remained as assistant coach from 2007 to 2010, and was not appointed as Crusaders' head coach when Robbie Deans left to coach Australia in 2008; Todd Blackadder was given the head coach role instead. During his time at the Crusaders, he helped guide the team to the semi-finals of every single season he was at the franchise, before securing their sixth and seventh title in 2006 and 2008. In later 2010, he was appointed coach of the Wellington-based Hurricanes ahead of the 2011 Super Rugby season. After the 2011 Super Rugby season – his first season in charge – Hammett decided controversially not to renew the contracts of All Blacks Ma'a Nonu and then Hurricanes' captain Andrew Hore. In the three years at the helm in Wellington, the Hurricanes failed to progress to the knock-out phase of the competition, only getting as high as seventh on the table; in 2014 Super Rugby season. In April 2014 Hammett indicated he would not be seeking to renew his contract when it expired at the end of the 2014 season.

=== Outside New Zealand: 2014–2016 ===
On 18 May 2014, Hammett was named Director of Rugby for Wales-based team Cardiff Blues, working alongside Dale McIntosh and Paul John. The Mark Hammett era was a slow start, losing both the pre-season friendlies. However, the first round saw Cardiff defeat Zebre 41–26. Despite only winning one game in his first competitive 6 games, Hammett lead Cardiff to a surprise victory over French side Grenoble and an easy victory over Rovigo Delta in the 2014–15 European Rugby Challenge Cup. These games were backed-up by a narrow loss to Irish giants Munster. On 24 January 2015, Hammett led the Blues to an away victory over Grenoble, to see the side through to the quarter-finals of the 2014–15 European Rugby Challenge Cup. On 20 February 2015, Cardiff were beaten by Benetton Treviso 40–24 in Treviso, which later turned out to be Hammett's last game in charge of the Welsh side. On 25 February 2015, after six months of a three-year contract, Cardiff Blues agreed to release Hammett at his request for personal reasons, to allow him to return home to New Zealand.

On 21 December 2015, the Japan Rugby Football Union announced Hammett as the head coach of the newly formed Japanese Super Rugby franchise, the Sunwolves. In their debut season, the side finished bottom of the newly expanded table, with 1 win. Ironically, their win came against the other newly formed team, the Jaguares, a team made up predominantly of the successful Argentine side from the 2015 Rugby World Cup. On 27 June, it was announced that Hammett would be leaving the Japanese side to return to New Zealand. It had previously been announced that Hammett would be joining the Tasman Makos in 2016 as their new assistant coach for the 2016 Mitre 10 Cup. While in June 2016, it was announced that Mark Hammett will remain in Super Rugby, but as an assistant coach at the Highlanders.

In March 2016, Hammett was named as the caretaker coach for the Japanese national team, while Jamie Joseph closes out his contract with the Highlanders. Hammett led the Brave Blossoms to a 26–22 win over Canada, before losing 2–0 to Scotland during their two-test series.

=== 2017 onwards ===
Hammett was assistant coach for the Highlanders under the Head coach Aaron Mauger.

=== Coaching Honours ===
Crusaders (as assistant coach)

- Super 14 / Super Rugby
  - Winners: 2006, 2008
  - Runners-up: 2011

== Bibliography ==
- Gifford, Phil (2004). The Passion – The Stories Behind 125 years of Canterbury Rugby. Wilson Scott Publishing. ISBN 0-9582535-1-X.
- McIlraith, Matt (2005). Ten Years of Super 12. Hodder Moa. ISBN 1-86971-025-8.

Sporting positions
| Preceded by (Japan) Ryuji Nakatake (Caretaker) | Japan National Rugby Union Coach (Caretaker); 2016 | Succeeded by (New Zealand) Jamie Joseph |
