= Patricio Noriega =

Argentine-Australian rugby union player (born 1971)

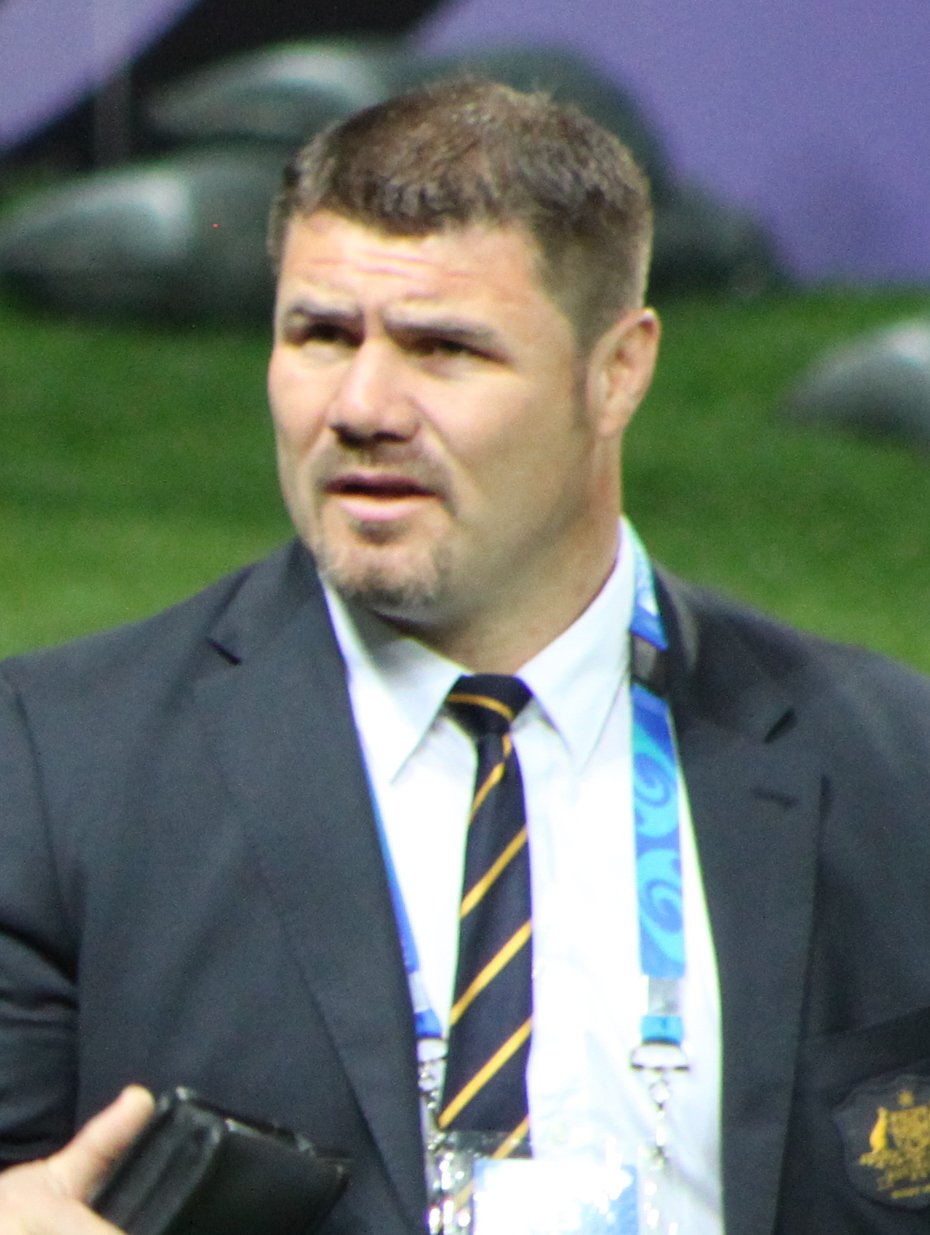
- Born: 22 October 1971 (age 55) Buenos Aires, Argentina
- Height: 1.85 m (6 ft 1 in)
- Weight: 117 kg (18 st 6 lb)

Rugby union career
- Position: Prop
Senior career
Years	Team	Apps	(Points)
2001–04	Waratahs	14	
2000–01	Stade Français		
1996–2000	Brumbies	56	
19??-1996	Hindú Club		
- Correct as of 5 March 2007
International career
Years	Team	Apps	(Points)
1998–2003	Australia	24	(0)
1991–95	Argentina	25	(10)
- Correct as of 5 March 2007
Coaching career
- Years: Team
- 2005–07: Hindú Club
- 2008: Lomas Athletic Club
- 2009–: Australia (Scrum Coach)
- Correct as of 5 March 2007

Patricio Noriega (born 22 October 1971, Argentina) is a former Argentine rugby union footballer who played prop. He started his career in local club Hindu and had his test debut for Los Pumas in 1991 against Paraguay. After playing two Rugby World Cup's (1991 and 1995) he then migrated to Australia to join Super 12 team the ACT Brumbies in 1996. After a couple of seasons, he was offered to play for the Wallabies and made his debut against France in 1998. However, he suffered a shoulder injury on the eve of the 1999 Rugby World Cup and was unable to play for his new national team in their victorious campaign. In 2000 he played for French team Stade Français before joining another Super 12 team, the New South Wales Waratahs in Sydney the following year. He played his final Wallabies test in 2003 against South Africa and in March 2004 he retired due to a chronic back injury. He was capped 25 times for the Argentine Pumas and 24 times for the Australian Wallabies.

After returning to Argentina he became head coach of his former club Hindú, leading them to win the National Clubs Championship in 2005.
