= Robbie Fleck =

South African rugby union player (born 1975)

- Born: Robert Frank Fleck; 17 July 1975 (age 51) Cape Town, South Africa
- Height: 6.0 ft (1.8 m)
- Weight: 15 st (95 kg)
- School: Bishops
- University: University of Cape Town

Rugby union career
- Position: Centre
Senior career
Years	Team	Apps	(Points)
2003–2004	Bath Rugby	13	(5)
Provincial / State sides
Years	Team	Apps	(Points)
1997–2003	Western Province	56	(70)
Super Rugby
Years	Team	Apps	(Points)
1998–2003	Stormers	48	(80)
International career
Years	Team	Apps	(Points)
1999–2002	South Africa	31	(50)

Robert Frank Fleck better known as Robbie (born 17 July 1975 in Cape Town) is a former rugby union footballer who played at centre for South Africa. He is also the former head coach of the Stormers team.

He made his international debut in the Tour of the UK & Ireland in 1998 and went on to make his test debut in 1999 against Italy.

He played for Bath Rugby in the English Premiership for a number of seasons.

Fleck attended Wynberg Boys' High School and Diocesan College in Cape Town.

At Bishops College Fleck played for their First XV in the same team alongside Herschelle Gibbs and Selborne Boome.
