= Stefan Terblanche =

South African rugby union player

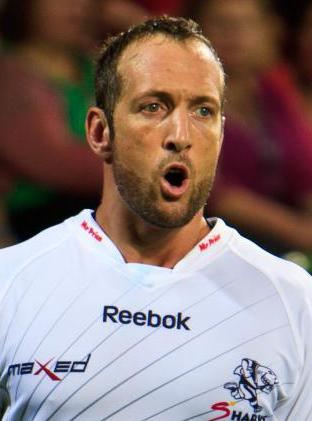
- Born: Carl Stefan Terblanche; 2 July 1975 (age 51) Mossel Bay, South Africa
- Height: 1.87 m (6 ft 2 in)
- Weight: 95 kg (14 st 13 lb)
- School: Swellendam High School

Rugby union career
- Position: Fullback / Wing / Centre
Youth career
- Boland Cavaliers
Senior career
Years	Team	Apps	(Points)
2003–07	Ospreys	87	(87)
2011–12	Ulster	16	(15)
Provincial / State sides
Years	Team	Apps	(Points)
	Boland Cavaliers	66	(66)
1998–2003	Sharks (Currie Cup)	42	(161)
Super Rugby
Years	Team	Apps	(Points)
2007–11	Sharks	122	(175)
International career
Years	Team	Apps	(Points)
1998–2003	South Africa	37	(95)

Carl Stefan Terblanche (born 2 July 1975, in Mossel Bay) is a South African former rugby union player. He played wing, centre and fullback.

== Career ==
Terblanche played in 37 tests for South Africa, scoring 19 tries, including a South African test record of four tries (equalled with Chester Williams and Pieter Rossouw) on debut against Ireland at Bloemfontein on 13 June 1998, which he later bettered by scoring a then record five tries against Italy on 19 June 1999.

Terblanche started his career under the tutelage of Nick Mallet at the Boland Cavaliers (66 caps). He made his debut in 1999 for the Sharks and played for the Ospreys in Wales. Terblanche moved back to the Sharks for the 2007 Currie Cup season in South Africa. He played his return game for the Durban-based franchise at Fullback and scored two tries and claimed man of the match in the Shark's 32–16 defeat over Western Province, the team who has won the Currie Cup title a record 32 times. This was also his 100th match played for the Sharks.

He is known as a great finisher—his test try per match ratio of 0.51 is among the highest in Springbok history and is significantly better than those of players like Carel du Plessis (0.33), Breyton Paulse (0.4) and Jean de Villiers (0.4), on par with current stars Jaque Fourie (0.5), Bryan Habana (0.54) and old legend Pieter Rossouw (0.48) but short of Ray Mordt (0.66 or two tries in every three tests), and Danie Gerber's (0.79) incredible scoring records. On 3 October 2007 it was announced that Terblanche had re-signed for the Sharks on a one-year contract. In 2010, Terblanche was appointed captain of the Sharks. In that same year he led them to victory in the Currie Cup final, with the Sharks beating Western Province 30–10.

On 1 November 2011 he signed a 3-month contract with Ulster rugby to provide cover for Jared Payne, who ruptured his Achilles tendon in the PRO12 match against Treviso on 7 October.

== National & International Representation ==
- Craven Week: South Western District 1991–93
- Boland U23 1995
- Boland Cavaliers (66 caps)
- Sharks 1999–2007 (101 caps) as at 17 July 2007
- Ospreys 2003–07 (87 apps) as at 3 October 2007
- South Africa U21 1996
- South African Barbarians 1996
- South Africa 1998–2003 (37 caps)
- British Barbarians 2000–01

== Other Achievements ==
- Holds Boland Cavaliers record for most tries in a season (20 in 1997)
- Holds Boland Cavaliers record for career tries (49)
- Equal top try scorer in 1998 Super 12 with 10 tries.
- Tri-Nations winner with South Africa 1998
- Member of Ospreys squad winning the 2006–07 Celtic League
- Currie Cup winner with Sharks 2008
- Currie Cup winner with Sharks 2010
