= Pieter Rossouw (rugby union) =

South African rugby union player (born 1971)

- Born: Pieter Willem Gabriel Rossouw; 3 December 1971 (age 54) Swellendam, South Africa
- Height: 1.93 m (6 ft 4 in)
- Weight: 94 kg (14 st 11 lb)
- School: Paarl Gimnasium
- University: University of Stellenbosch
- Notable relative: Chris Rossouw
- Occupation: Backline coach at Namibia national rugby union team

Rugby union career
- Position: Wing
Provincial / State sides
Years	Team	Apps	(Points)
1991	Boland Cavaliers	5	(0)
1994–2001	Western Province	121	(345)
2002	London Irish	7	(5)
- Correct as of 22 June 2014
Super Rugby
Years	Team	Apps	(Points)
1996–2004	Stormers	75	(155)
International career
Years	Team	Apps	(Points)
1997–2003	South Africa	43	(105)
Coaching career
- Years: Team
- 2007: Western Province u/19
- 2008–2015: Bulls (Backline coach)
- 2015–2016: Namibia (Backs coach)
- 2016–present: Paarl Gimnasium
- 2025: Namibia (Consultant)
- 2025: Namibia

Pieter Willem Gabriel Rossouw (born 3 December 1971) is a South African former professional rugby player and current coach. Rossouw played wing for Western Province in the Currie Cup and the Stormers in the Super Rugby competition. He played a total of 43 times for the Springboks, making him one of the most capped Springbok wingers after South Africa's readmission to international rugby. He was also one of South Africa's most prolific try-scoring wingers, post-isolation, with only Breyton Paulse(26) and Bryan Habana(53) scoring more tries. He is 7th on the all-time try-scoring list for the Springboks. Rossouw is currently the backline coach of the Bulls in Super rugby and the Blue Bulls in the Currie Cup. He was known as "Slaptjips" (Afrikaans for potato chips or french fries), apparently because the sight of his running legs was like potato chips slapping together.

== Personal and Early life ==
Rossouw was born in Swellendam in 1971. He went to school in Paarl at Paarl Gimnasium before going to university at the University of Stellenbosch, where he played for the university's rugby team. Pieter is the older brother of Chris Rossouw, who played flyhalf for Western Province and the Free State Cheetahs.

== Playing career ==
=== 1994 to 1998 ===
Pieter Rossouw made his debut for Western Province in 1994.

In 1996 Rossouw was selected for the Western Province team to compete in the Super 12.

In 1997, South African Rugby has not yet adopted the franchise system, which New Zealand has done. Instead, the four semi-finalists of the previous year's Currie Cup competition qualified for the Super 12. In 1996, Western Province was defeated in the quarter-finals by the Gauteng Lions and did not progress to the semi-finals. Their place in 1997's Super 12 was therefore taken by the Free State Cheetahs. This meant Pieter Rossouw did not play any Super Rugby in 1997.

Despite not featuring in the Super 12 in 1997, Rossouw was selected for the Springboks to face the touring British and Irish Lions in 1997. He made his Springbok debut against the Lions in the second test of the tour on 28 June 1997 at Kings Park in Durban. South Africa lost the game 15-18. Rossouw was again in the team to face the Lions in the third and final test, when he scored the first of his 21 test tries. South Africa won 35-16, but lost the test series 2-1.

Rossouw was part of the Springbok team that played in the annual Tri-nations series in 1997. He was one of the try scorers when South Africa beat Australia with 61 points to 22. It remains the Springboks' highest score against the Wallabies.

At the end of 1997 the Springboks toured to Europe, playing test matches against Italy, France, England and Scotland. Pieter Rossouw was a member of this touring squad. On 22 November 1997 South Africa faced France at the Parc des Princes in Paris, which was the French's last game at the stadium before moving to the Stade de France in Saint-Denis. The Springboks humiliated France by 52 points to 10. Rossouw became only the second Springbok in history to score 4 tries in one test.

In 1997, Western Province won the Currie Cup by beating Free State in the final by 14 points to 12 at Newlands in Cape Town. Rossouw was the left wing for Western Province on the day.

In 1998 South African rugby adopted the franchise system for the Super 12. New teams were formed located in Pretoria, Durban, Cape Town and Johannesburg. Cape Town had again a team in the Super 12. They weren't called Western Province, but the Stormers. The Stormers were selected from players representing Western Province, Boland and South Western Districts. This gave Rossouw the opportunity to return to Super Rugby.

The Springboks won the 1998 Tri Nations Series, having not lost a single game. The away game for the Springboks against the All Blacks took place at Athletic Park in Wellington on 25 July 1998. Rossouw scored the only try of the game from either side, and South Africa ended up winning 13-3. This was the Springboks' first win on New Zealand soil since readmission and also their first since 29 August 1981 at the same venue.

From the 1997 tour to Europe to the second last game of the European tour of 1998, South Africa played in 17 consecutive unbeaten tests, equalising the record set by the All Blacks between 1965 and 1970. The All Blacks eclipsed this record by winning 23 consecutive tests, starting with the World Cup in 1987. However, South Africa, who ended their unbeaten run in 1970, was not part of their opposition during this period, due to the sporting boycott. Pieter Rossouw played in all 17 victorious tests for the Springboks in their unbeaten run from 1997 to 1998.

=== 1999 ===
Rossouw continued to play Currie Cup rugby for Western Province and Super Rugby for the Stormers from 1999 until his retirement in 2004, except in 2002 when he joined London Irish for one season.

Rossouw was part of the only Springbok team to have lost to Wales. On 26 June 1999 at the Millennium Stadium in Cardiff, Wales beat South Africa by 29 to 19. The first and, to date, only time Wales have beaten the Springboks.

He remained a regular selection for the Springboks in 1999, which included the World Cup, hosted by Wales. He was selected for the pool games against Scotland and Uruguay as well as the quarter-final against England and the semi-final against Australia. His only try of the tournament came against England in the quarterfinal.

=== 2000 to 2003 ===
From 2000 Rossouw played less frequently for the Springboks. He played his last Tri-nations game against Australia in Sydney on 29 July 2000. He was selected for the Springboks for seven more tests with his final Springbok test on 28 June 2003 at Boet Erasmus Stadium in Port Elizabeth.

Rossouw continued to be a regular starting selection for Western Province and the Stormers and he won two successive Currie Cups with Western Province in 2000 and 2001, beating the Sharks in both finals and scoring a try in the 2000 final.

In 2002 it was announced that Rossouw did not renew his contract with the Stormers and SARFU and elected to sign with English Premiership team, London Irish. Arriving at London Irish, Rossouw struggled with a hamstring injury and ended up playing only eight games for the team, scoring one try. London Irish did not have a very good season, which prompted coach Brendan Venter to make himself available to play again. At the time Premiership teams were only allowed to field to overseas players, with the other being Naka Drotske. Rossouw was therefore released from his contract towards the end of 2002.

Rossouw returned to Cape Town and again played Currie Cup for Western Province and Super Rugby for the Stormers.

=== 2004 ===
Although Rossouw formed part of the Stormers squad for the 2004 Super 12 season and the Western Province squad for the Currie Cup, he was eventually dropped from the team by coach Carel du Plessis before a game against the Bulls in August 2004. This led him to announce his retirement at the beginning of October 2004.

In total Pieter Rossouw scored 31 Super Rugby tries, placing him at 27th on the all-time highest try-scorers in Super Rugby competition history. He holds this position jointly with Ben Tune of the Reds and Lelia Masaga of the Chiefs.

== Coaching career ==
Pieter Rossouw started his coaching career at Majuba residence at the Stellenbosch University in 2006. There after, he was involved in coaching with the Western Province Vodacom Cup team as well as the Western Province under 19 team in 2007 and signed with the Blue Bulls Rugby Union as backline coach for the Bulls and Blue Bulls in February 2008.

As part of the Bulls' coaching set-up, Rossouw has won a Currie Cup trophy in 2009 and Super Rugby trophies in 2009 and 2010. He resigned from the job in June 2015 and started was appointed as backs coach with the Namibian national team under Phil Davies ahead of the 2015 Rugby World Cup.

Following the Rugby World Cup campaign, Rossouw returned to South Africa where be became head coach of his former high school Paarl Gimnasium.

In September 2025, he rejoined the Namibian National team ahead of the 2027 Rugby World Cup Final Qualification Tournament as an attacking consultant However, in October 2025 he was later appointed Head Coach, replacing Jacques Burger who served as interim head coach after Chrysander Botha suddenly resigned in July 2025. With Rossouw's promotion to Head Coach, Burger returned to his original position of Director of Rugby.

== Honours ==
=== Playing career ===
SA Rugby Player of the Year nominee, 1997

Western Province

- Currie Cup: 1997, 2000, 2001

South Africa

- Tri Nations: 1998

=== Coaching career ===
Blue Bulls

- Currie Cup: 2009

Bulls

- Super 14: 2009, 2010

Sporting positions
Preceded by (Namibia) Jacques Burger (Interim)	Namibia National Rugby Union Coach; 2025–	Succeeded by Incumbent
