= Viliami Ofahengaue =

Australian rugby union player (born 1968)

- Full name: Viliami Ofahengaue
- Born: 3 May 1968 (age 58) Kolofoou, Tonga
- Height: 1.93 m (6 ft 4 in)
- Weight: 118 kg (18 st 8 lb)
- School: Tupou College Toloa, Seddon High School
- Notable relative: Joe Ofahengaue (nephew)

Rugby union career
- Position(s): Flanker, No.8
Senior career
Years	Team	Apps	(Points)
1988-1990	Manly RUFC		
1991-1999	NSW Waratahs		
1992-1993	Rugby Rovigo		
1999-2004	Kubota Spears		
- Correct as of 30 January 2024
International career
Years	Team	Apps	(Points)
1988	New Zealand Schools		
1990-1998	Australia	41	(55)
1992	World XV	2	(0)
- Correct as of 30 January 2024
National sevens team
Years	Team		Comps
1993	Australia		1
- Correct as of 30 January 2024
Coaching career
- Years: Team
- 2004-2005: Tonga (head coach)
- Correct as of 30 January 2024

Viliami Ofahengaue (born 3 May 1968 in Kolofoou, Tonga), widely known as Willie O, is a former rugby union player who earned 41 caps for the Australian Wallabies from 1990 to 1998, and played in the World Cups of 1991 and 1995 as well as the 1993 World Cup Sevens.

Ofahengaue attended Tupou College Toloa in Tonga. He was included in Toloas 1st XV team that was undefeated throughout all the secondary schools in Tonga, it was after his years at Tupou College Toloa where he had the opportunities to travel around Australia and New Zealand through rugby. Ofahengaue moved to stay with relatives in Auckland to complete his education at Seddon High School and he was selected to play for New Zealand Schoolboys in 1988 and participated in a tour to Australia. However, on the return trip, he was refused re-entry to New Zealand with his Tongan passport so he moved to Australia.

It was while playing for the Manly Rugby Club that he was selected for the NSW and Australian teams. He scored 11 Test tries for Australia from the back of the scrum before handing over the No.8 jersey to fellow Tongan Toutai Kefu at the end of 1998.

== Coaching ==
After finishing his playing career in Australia, Ofahengaue worked as player/coach in Japan for the next five years, visiting Fiji in 2001 to lend assistance to Tonga's Pacific Rim campaign. He became head coach of the 'Ikale Tahi in January 2004. He has also coached Japanese and Manly club sides.

Former Wallabies No.8 Wycliff Palu mentioned Ofahengaue as someone he looked up to during his early career.

He now resides in the western suburbs of Melbourne in Sunshine, Victoria with his wife and children where he serves as a minister for the Free Wesleyan Church of Tonga.

Ofahengaue is the uncle of former NRL player Joe Ofahengaue.

== Honours and awards ==
On 31 July 2008, Ofahengaue was appointed a Member of the Order of Queen Sālote Tupou III.

In 2025, Ofahengaue was inducted into the Pasifika Rugby Hall of Fame.

Sporting positions
Preceded by (New Zealand) Jim Love	Tonga National Rugby Union Coach; 2004–05	Succeeded by (Australia) Adam Leach
