= Nathan Grey (rugby union) =

Australia international rugby union player

- Born: Nathan Patrick Grey; 31 March 1975 (age 51) Gosford, Australia
- School: The Southport School
- Occupation: Rugby union Coach

Rugby union career
- Position: Centre
Senior career
Years	Team	Apps	(Points)
-1997	Queensland Reds	?	(?)
1998–2005	NSW Waratahs	94	(108)
International career
Years	Team	Apps	(Points)
1998–2003	Australia	35	(35)
Coaching career
- Years: Team
- 2003–11: Kyuden Voltex (player-coach)
- 2011–13: Melbourne Rebels (Asst. Coach)
- 2013–: NSW Waratahs (Defence coach)
- 2014–: Australia (Defence coach)

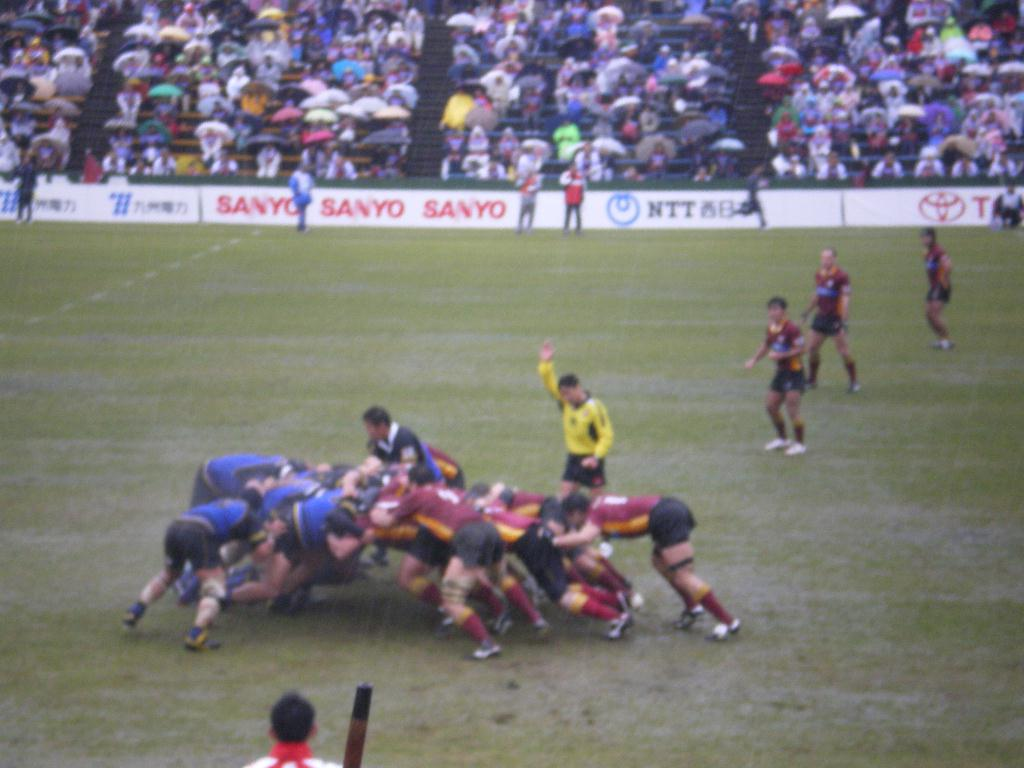
Fukuoka v Kyuden, January 2008. Grey is inside centre (No. 12).

Nathan Patrick Grey (born 31 March 1975 in Gosford) is a former Australian rugby union footballer, who played mostly at centre, sometimes flyhalf. He is currently the defence coach for the New South Wales Waratahs and the Australian national team.

== Early years ==
As a boy, Grey lived in Papua New Guinea and Fiji for three years. He moved to Queensland and started at The Southport School in 1987.

== Career ==
After he left school Grey joined the Queensland Reds extended training squad. In 1997 he played two games for Queensland against France, at Ballymore Stadium. At the end of 1997, after being invited on a NSW development tour of the UK, he was offered a full contract with the New South Wales Waratahs.

He made his Waratahs debut in March 1998, against the ACT Brumbies, at Sydney Football Stadium. Between 1998 and 2005, Grey played 94 Super games for the Waratahs, 92 at centre, one at flyhalf, and one as a flanker. (For the Wallabies, he was also named to play at least one Test at flyhalf.)

In 1998, Grey played his first Test for Australia, when he came off the bench against Scotland to score a try.

In 2001 Grey was involved in controversy after a cynical high tackle on Richard Hill during a Lions test match.

In 2005, Grey made a strong statement against racist slurs of the kind attributed to him during a Test against South Africa. According to a UK newspaper, Grey said: "I am personally offended by the reports because I consider remarks of the type I am alleged to have made to be appalling in every respect."

Grey went on to play 35 Tests for Australia. He was a member of the victorious Wallabies at the 1999 Rugby World Cup, coached by Rod Macqueen. In 89th minute of the final, Grey left the bench to relieve inside centre Tim Horan. He was a member of Australia's 2003 Rugby World Cup squad, and trained with fellow centre Stirling Mortlock.

After leaving the Waratahs, Grey spent five years in Japan. Commencing in 2005, Grey played for Kyushu Electric Power Company's Kyuden Voltex, in Fukuoka. As player-coach he helped Kyuden achieve promotion to the Top League for the 2007-8 season.

In April 2010, Grey became the Melbourne Rebels first defence (or skills) Coach. The 2011 Super Rugby season was the Rebels first in Super Rugby. Grey had been recruited by Rebels founding coach Rod Macqueen. Stirling Mortlock became captain. After the 2011 season Macqueen handed over to Damien Hill who promoted Grey to Assistant Coach in preparation for 2012.

However, in 2013, Grey was recruited by newly appointed Waratahs head coach Michael Cheika for the 2013 Super Rugby season. He had a massive influence on the team in his debut season, improving the Waratahs defence to secure 9th in the standings with a better points for than against. In 2014, he helped guide the Waratahs to their first ever Super Rugby title, which included the Waratahs having a home grand final as they finished top of the standings after the regular season. In February 2015, he was appointed as defence coach for the Australian national side for the 2015 Rugby World Cup by newly appointed head coach Michael Cheika.

During the 2015 Super Rugby season, Grey's defensive structures were challenged, with the Waratahs leaking 41 tries, almost double the amount of the 2013 Season, 24. He was heavily criticised after the 35–17 loss to the Highlanders in the semi-final in Sydney, having conceded 20 points in the second half of the match to see the Waratahs knocked out of the tournament.

== Education ==
Grey has a bachelor's degree in Business Management and a master's in Marketing.
