= Carl Hoeft =

- Born: Carl Henry Hoeft; 13 November 1974 (age 52) Auckland, New Zealand
- Height: 1.84 m (6 ft 0 in)
- Weight: 115 kg (18 st 2 lb)
- School: Te Aroha College

Rugby union career
- Position: Prop
Amateur team(s)
Years	Team	Apps	(Points)
- Dunedin Pirates, Te Aroha COBRAS
Senior career
Years	Team	Apps	(Points)
2005-2011	Castres Olympique		
2011-2011	Stade Toulousain		
Provincial / State sides
Years	Team	Apps	(Points)
1994–1995	Thames Valley	37	
1996–2005	Otago	70	
Super Rugby
Years	Team	Apps	(Points)
1997–2005	Highlanders	98	
International career
Years	Team	Apps	(Points)
1998–2003	New Zealand	30	(0)

Carl Henry Hoeft (born 13 November 1974) is a former rugby union footballer from New Zealand, currently working as coach.

His usual position was at loosehead prop. He was a part of the New Zealand national rugby union team squad at both the 1999 and 2003 Rugby World Cups. Hoeft was known as a powerful scrummager.

He played club rugby for the Highlanders (rugby union) in New Zealand and for Castres Olympique and Toulouse in France. After his retirement from rugby in late 2011 he became coach and entered the provincial side Waikato's staff as assistant for the scrum.
