= Tom Bowman (rugby union) =

Australian rugby union player (born 1976)

Tom Bowman (born 13 May 1976) is an Australian former professional rugby union player who played as a lock. Born in Molong, New South Wales, Australia, he won 16 caps for Australia, making his debut in the 76–0 win over England in June 1998. The last test he played for Australia was the World Cup pool match against United States in 1999.
