= Werner Swanepoel =

South Africa international rugby union player

- Born: 15 April 1973 (age 53) Bloemfontein, South Africa
- Height: 5 ft 8 in (1.73 m)
- Weight: 168 lb (12 st 0 lb)
- School: Grey College
- University: University of Pretoria

Rugby union career
- Position: Scrum-half
Senior career
Years	Team	Apps	(Points)
2002–2004	Worcester		
Provincial / State sides
Years	Team	Apps	(Points)
1993, 95–98	Free State	61	(105)
1994	Northern Transvaal	8	(15)
1999	Golden Lions	16	(10)
Super Rugby
Years	Team	Apps	(Points)
1998–2001	Cats	34	(25)
International career
Years	Team	Apps	(Points)
1997–2000	South Africa	20	(30)

Werner Swanepoel (born 15 April 1973) is a former South African rugby union player. He played as a scrum half for the Springboks from 1997 to 2000. His appearances for the Springboks were curtailed by virtue of his career coinciding with that of Joost van der Westhuizen. For the toothy grin he often flashed on the rugby field, he was given the nickname, "Smiley".

== Career ==
Swanepoel attended Grey College in Bloemfontein and played for the Free State Craven Week team from 1989 to 1991 and was selected for the South African Schools team in 1991. His senior provincial debut for the Free State was in 1993, whereafter he also played for Northern Transvaal, the Golden Lions and the Cats.

Swanepoel made his debut for the Springboks in 1997 against the British Lions at Ellis Park in Johannesburg. He represented South Africa in the 1999 Rugby World Cup, scoring a try in their pool match against Spain. In 2001, he was a replacement for The Barbarians in their match against Australia in Cardiff. His career was ended unexpectedly when he contracted viral meningitis while he was playing with the English club, Worcester.

=== Test history ===
No.	Opposition	Result (SA 1st)	Position	Tries	Date	Venue
1.	British Lions	35–16	Replacement		5 Jul 1997	Ellis Park, Johannesburg
2.	Australia	62–32	Replacement		23 Aug 1997	Loftus Versfeld, Pretoria
3.	France	36–32	Replacement		15 Nov 1997	Stade de Gerland, Lyon
4.	France	52–10	Scrumhalf		22 Nov 1997	Parc des Princes, Paris
5.	England	29–11	Scrumhalf	1	29 Nov 1997	Twickenham, London
6.	Scotland	68–10	Scrumhalf		6 Dec 1997	Murrayfield, Edinburgh
7.	Ireland	33–0	Replacement		20 Jun 1998	Loftus Versfeld, Pretoria
8.	Wales	96–13	Replacement		27 Jun 1998	Loftus Versfeld, Pretoria
9.	England	7–13	Replacement		5 Dec 1998	Twickenham, London
10.	Italy	74–3	Scrumhalf		12 Jun 1999	Boet Erasmus Stadium, Port Elizabeth
11.	Italy	101–0	Replacement		19 Jun 1999	Kings Park, Durban
12.	Wales	19–29	Scrumhalf	1	26 Jun 1998	Millennium Stadium, Cardiff
13.	Australia	6–32	Scrumhalf		17 Jul 1999	Suncorp Stadium, Brisbane
14.	Spain	47–3	Scrumhalf	1	10 Oct 1999	Murrayfield, Edinburgh
15.	New Zealand	22–18	Replacement		4 Nov 1999	Millennium Stadium, Cardiff
16.	Australia	23–44	Scrumhalf	1	8 Jul 2000	Colonial Stadium, Melbourne
17.	New Zealand	12–25	Scrumhalf		22 Jul 2000	Jade Stadium, Christchurch
18.	Australia	6–26	Scrumhalf		29 Jul 2000	Stadium Australia, Sydney
19.	New Zealand	46–40	Scrumhalf	2	19 Aug 2000	Ellis Park, Johannesburg
20.	Australia	18–19	Scrumhalf		26 Aug 2000	Kings Park, Durban

== See also ==
- List of South Africa national rugby union players – Springbok no. 654
