= Selborne Boome =

South African rugby union player

- Born: Christopher Selborne Boome; 16 April 1975 (age 51) Somerset West, South Africa
- Height: 1.98 m (6 ft 6 in)
- Weight: 107 kg (236 lb)
- School: Diocesan College
- University: Stellenbosch University

Rugby union career
- Position(s): Lock, Flank
Amateur team(s)
Years	Team	Apps	(Points)
- Maties
Senior career
Years	Team	Apps	(Points)
2000–02	Montferrand	19	(5)
2004–06	Northampton Saints	19	(0)
Provincial / State sides
Years	Team	Apps	(Points)
1997–98, 02, 06–07	Western Province	54	(15)
Super Rugby
Years	Team	Apps	(Points)
1998–00, 03–04	Stormers	41	(25)
International career
Years	Team	Apps	(Points)
1999–03	South Africa	20	(10)

Christopher Selborne Boome (born 16 April 1975) is a South African former professional rugby union player who has made 20 appearances for the South African national rugby union team, the Springboks. He represented Northampton Saints and Montferrand overseas and had 2 spells in Super Rugby with the Stormers franchise.

== Playing career ==
Boome attended Bishops College in Cape Town and played for their First XV in the same team alongside Herschelle Gibbs and Robbie Fleck.

Boome won the 1997 Currie Cup with Western Province and made his test debut against Italy 2 years later. He was ruled out of the 1999 Rugby World Cup with a thumb injury but was back the following year to represent the Springboks in the millennium test against Canada.

Boome represented South Africa at the 2003 Rugby World Cup playing against Uruguay, Georgia and in the 29-9 quarter-final exit at the hands of the All Blacks. He was involved in the controversial Kamp Staaldraad incident as well as a racial feud with then roommate Geo Cronjé who refused to share a room with a "coloured".

In 2004 Boome departed to join Northampton Saints and later returned to South Africa in 2007 for his swansong season with Western Province in that season's Currie Cup.

== See also ==
- List of South Africa national rugby union players – Springbok no. 670
