= Royce Willis =

- Born: 28 August 1975 (age 51) Tokoroa
- Height: 1.97 m (6 ft 5 1/2 in)
- Weight: 120 kg (265 lb)
- School: Tauranga Boys' College

Rugby union career
- Position: Lock
Senior career
Years	Team	Apps	(Points)
2003-2009	Kobelco Steelers		
- Correct as of 2012
Provincial / State sides
Years	Team	Apps	(Points)
- Bay of Plenty
-	Waikato	50	
Super Rugby
Years	Team	Apps	(Points)
- Blues
–	Chiefs		
International career
Years	Team	Apps	(Points)
1998-2002	New Zealand	12	(0)

Royce Kevin Willis (born 28 August 1975 in Tokoroa) was an international rugby union player who represented New Zealand in 12 matches between 1998 and 2002.

== Rugby career ==
Willis was educated at Tauranga Boys College where he first began playing rugby, he made the national secondary schools sides for three seasons in the early 1990s. In 1994 while still at school he played one game for the Bay of Plenty representative side. He returned to do 2nd year in 7th form so that he could be a member of the successful rowing eight in the year below him. This crew went on to win the Maadi cup and Springbok shield.

Willis made the New Zealand Colts in 1995-96 and took a major step forward as a member of the Waikato representative side in 1997. Though he received just the one start in the NPC, Willis impressed as a replacement from the bench and shared in the Ranfurly Shield win over Auckland.

In 1998 he entered the Super made the New Zealand A squad for matches against England and Tonga.

With the World Cup looming in 1999 Willis was one of the players coach John Hart and his selectors turned to bolster the squad.

Willis took over from veteran Ian Jones and played the last two tests of the season, against South Africa and Australia.

He missed most of the 1999 Super 12 with the Chiefs, but he recovered in time to play a couple of matches for New Zealand A. He came on as a substitute in the final four domestic matches and was also used as a bench player in the World Cup with Robin Brooke and Norman Maxwell the preferred locks.

Jones was also in the squad and so Willis's chances were limited. At the World Cup he made five appearances, but started only in the pool match against Italy and in the third-fourth playoff against South Africa.

For the 2000 season, with Wayne Smith now the All Black coach, Willis was not a first choice selection as the All Blacks were concerned. He was overlooked in both the 2000 and the 2001 seasons, his only national representation coming with four appearances with New Zealand A on the tour of Europe at the end of the 2000 season.

In 2002 Willis was recalled to the All Black squad under the coaching now of John Mitchell. He made just one appearance, getting the final 10 minutes of the tri-nations test against the Springboks at the Wellington Stadium as a replacement. Willis had an excellent season with Waikato in the 2002 NPC but then departed along with other Waikato stalwarts such as Bruce Reihana and Deon Muir for overseas.

Willis managed 114 first class matches, of which 50 were for Waikato and 36 in the Super 12. Of his dozen tests eight were as a replacement or as a substitute.

Royce is now working as a physiotherapist specialising in balance disorders in Nelson, NZ.

== Honours ==
- 2003-04 Japan Rugby Top League Best15
