= Naka Drotské =

South African rugby union player

- Full name: Allen Erasmus Drotské
- Born: 15 March 1971 (age 55) Senekal, Free State, South Africa
- Height: 1.82 m (5 ft 11 1/2 in)
- Weight: 108 kg (17 st 0 lb; 238 lb)
- School: Grey College, Bloemfontein

Rugby union career
- Position: Hooker
Youth career
- 1989: SA Schools
Senior career
| Years | Team | Apps | (Points) |
| 2001–2003 | London Irish | 58 | (10) |
Provincial / State sides
| Years | Team | Apps | (Points) |
| 1992–99 | Free State | 97 | (135) |
| 2000 | Blue Bulls | 10 | (5) |
| 2001 | Pumas | 1 | (0) |
| 2004–05 | Cheetahs | 30 | (5) |
Super Rugby
| Years | Team | Apps | (Points) |
| 1998–99, 05 | Cats | 23 | (20) |
| 2000–01 | Bulls | 16 | (0) |
International career
| Years | Team | Apps | (Points) |
| 1993–99 | South Africa | 26 | (15) |
Coaching career
- Years: Team
- 2007–13: Free State Cheetahs
- 2007–15: Cheetahs

Allen Erasmus Drotské (born 15 March 1971), commonly known as Naka Drotské, is a South African former rugby union player, who played as a hooker. He played for the South Africa national team, the Springboks, 26 times between 1993 and 1999.

== Playing career ==
=== Provincial ===
Drotské played as a flank for the Free State Schools team at the 1989 Craven Week tournament and gained selection for the South African Schools team. In 1992 he made his provincial debut for Free State, also playing as a flank and during the 1993 he converted to the playing position of hooker. Drotské moved to the Blue Bulls for the 2000 provincial season and also played the Bulls in the Super Rugby competition.

In 2001 Drotské signed with London Irish to play for the club until 2003 and the following year he started in the 2002 Powergen Cup Final at Twickenham, as London Irish defeated the Northampton Saints.

=== International ===
Drotské played his first test match for the Springboks on 13 November 1993 against Argentina in Buenos Aires, a game the 'Boks won 52–23. He was a member of the 1995 Rugby World Cup winning squad, playing in one match and was also a member of the 1999 Rugby World Cup squad. During the 1999 World Cup, he played in six matches for the Springboks.

=== Test history ===
| No. | Opposition | Result (SA 1st) | Position | Tries | Date | Venue |
|---|---|---|---|---|---|---|
| 1. | Argentina | 52–23 | Hooker | | 13 Nov 1993 | Ferro Carril Oeste, Buenos Aires |
| 2. | Samoa | 42–14 | Replacement | | 10 Jun 1995 | Ellis Park, Johannesburg |
| 3. | Australia | 16–21 | Replacement | | 13 Jul 1996 | Sydney Football Stadium, Sydney |
| 4. | Tonga | 74–10 | Hooker | 1 | 10 Jun 1997 | Newlands, Cape Town |
| 5. | British Lions | 16–25 | Hooker | | 21 Jun 1997 | Newlands, Cape Town |
| 6. | British Lions | 15–18 | Hooker | | 28 Jun 1997 | Kings Park, Durban |
| 7. | British Lions | 35–16 | Replacement | | 5 Jul 1997 | Ellis Park, Johannesburg |
| 8. | New Zealand | 32–35 | Hooker | 1 | 19 Jul 1997 | Ellis Park, Johannesburg |
| 9. | Australia | 20–32 | Hooker | | 2 Aug 1997 | Suncorp Stadium, Brisbane |
| 10. | New Zealand | 35–55 | Replacement | | 9 Aug 1997 | Eden Park, Auckland |
| 11. | Ireland | 33–0 | Replacement | | 20 Jun 1998 | Loftus Versfeld, Pretoria |
| 12. | Wales | 96–13 | Replacement | | 27 Jun 1998 | Loftus Versfeld, Pretoria |
| 13. | Ireland | 27–13 | Replacement | | 28 Nov 1998 | Lansdowne Road, Dublin |
| 14. | Italy | 74–3 | Hooker | | 12 Jun 1999 | Boet Erasmus, Port Elizabeth |
| 15. | Italy | 101–0 | Hooker | 1 | 19 June 1999 | Kings Park, Durban |
| 16. | Wales | 19–29 | Hooker | | 26 June 1999 | Millennium Stadium, Cardiff |
| 17. | New Zealand | 0–28 | Hooker | | 10 July 1999 | Carisbrook, Dunedin |
| 18. | Australia | 6–32 | Hooker | | 17 July 1999 | Suncorp Stadium, Brisbane |
| 19. | New Zealand | 18–34 | Hooker | | 7 Aug 1999 | Loftus Versfeld, Pretoria |
| 20. | Australia | 10–9 | Hooker | | 14 Aug 1999 | Newlands, Cape Town |
| 21. | Scotland | 46–29 | Hooker | | 3 Oct 1999 | Murrayfield, Edinburgh |
| 22. | Spain | 47–3 | Replacement | | 10 Oct 1999 | Murrayfield, Edinburgh |
| 23. | Uruguay | 39–3 | Hooker | | 15 Oct 1999 | Hampden Park, Glasgow |
| 24. | England | 44–21 | Hooker | | 24 Oct 1999 | Stade de France, Paris |
| 25. | Australia | 21–27 | Hooker | | 30 Oct 1999 | Twickenham, London |
| 26. | New Zealand | 22–18 | Hooker | | 4 Nov 1999 | Millennium Stadium, Cardiff |

== Coaching career ==
After retiring from playing, Drostké coached the Free State Cheetahs in the Currie Cup and the Cheetahs in Super Rugby between 2007 and 2015. He announced his retirement from coaching on 8 May 2015 to pursue other business interests.

== Personal life ==
In November 2018, Drostké was shot during a robbery in Pretoria, and was left in a critical condition.

== See also ==
- List of South Africa national rugby union players – Springbok no. 601
