= Phil Kearns =

Australian former rugby union player

Phil Kearns AM
- Born: Philip Nicholas Kearns; 27 June 1967 (age 59) Sydney, New South Wales, Australia
- School: Newington College, Sydney
- University: University of New South Wales
- Occupation(s): Commentator, Journalist

Rugby union career
Senior career
Years	Team	Apps	(Points)
- Randwick
Provincial / State sides
Years	Team	Apps	(Points)
	New South Wales	73	
International career
Years	Team	Apps	(Points)
1989–1999	Australia	67	(34)

Philip Nicholas Kearns AM (born 27 June 1967) is an Australian former rugby union player. He represented the Wallabies 67 times and was captain on ten occasions. He is a rugby commentator with Fox Sports Australia.

== Biography ==
Kearns was born in Sydney Australia and educated at Newington College (1979–84) and the University of New South Wales where he graduated with an Arts degree, majoring in Economics. He played his provincial rugby for New South Wales.

He made his Wallaby debut in 1989.

He enjoyed a rivalry on the pitch with New Zealand's Sean Fitzpatrick. During one Bledisloe Cup match he scored a try by barging through Fitzpatrick and then made a two fingered gesture to him, saying something which most TV watchers thought they could lip read. Kearns insisted he said "Two sausages at tonight's barbecue please". The catalyst for this incident was from the previous season when Fitzpatrick sledged Kearns without mercy, telling him to "Go home to your Mummy". Mr Kearns has subsequently stated that Mr Fitzpatrick was one of the toughest opponents he played against and that they have subsequently developed a close friendship.

He was a member of Australia's Rugby World Cup-winning teams of 1991 and 1999. Although he was injured midway through the 1999 tournament he is one of only 43 players who have won multiple Rugby World Cups.

In October 2005 in the driveway of his home, Kearns accidentally ran over his 19-month-old daughter, Andie. After a long hospital stay, his daughter made a full recovery. Kearns later launched a driveway safety campaign.

Another of Kearns' daughters, Matilda, is a member of the Australian women's national water polo team competing at the 2020 Tokyo Olympics and The World Aquatics Water PoloChampionships 2026 held in Sydney July 22-26th.

== Honours ==
Kearns was appointed a Member of the Order of Australia in 2017 for significant service to the community through support for charitable organisations, to business, and to rugby union at the elite level.

He was inducted into the Australian Rugby Hall of Fame in 2018.

== Post rugby career ==
As at August 2025, Kearns is the Chief Executive Officer of AVJennings.

Sporting positions
Preceded by Michael Lynagh	Australian national rugby union captain 1992-1995	Succeeded by Rod McCall
