= Owen Finegan =

Australia international rugby union player

- Born: Owen Finegan; 22 April 1972 (age 54) Sydney, New South Wales, Australia
- Height: 197 cm (6 ft 6 in)
- Weight: 119 kg (18 st 10 lb)
- School: Waverley College

Rugby union career
- Position(s): Flanker, Lock
Youth career
- -: Randwick Rugby Club
- –: Waverley Rugby Club
Senior career
Years	Team	Apps	(Points)
1996-05	ACT Brumbies	90	(155)
2005-06	Newcastle Falcons	28	(15)
2006-07	Leinster	24	(5)
2007	Leicester Tigers	1	(0)
International career
Years	Team	Apps	(Points)
1996-2003	Australia	56	(56)

Owen Finegan (born 22 April 1972, in Sydney) is an Australian former rugby union player of Irish descent who played as a flanker or lock, for the Australian national team, the Wallabies. Finegan is currently the CEO of The Kids' Cancer Project Australia.

He was a key performer for the ACT Brumbies from their inception in 1996, joining from Randwick Rugby Club. Finegan played in 90 Super 12 matches for the Brumbies and was one of three remaining foundation players in the 2005 squad. He has helped them to two titles, including captaining them to their 2004 triumph, and scoring a Super 12 record 31 tries for a forward.

He made his international debut against Wales in 1996 and went on to win 56 caps despite having ankle and knee reconstructions, plus operations on both shoulders. He was an integral part of the Wallabies' success over following decade and was named in the Wallaby team of the first professional decade in 2005.

The highlight of Finegan's career came in 1999, when he scored an injury time try as Australia won the Rugby World Cup.

Australia's player of the year in 2001, Finegan was controversially not picked by the Wallabies for the 2003 World Cup on home soil.

In 2005, he signed with English club Newcastle Falcons for two seasons, but was subsequently released after one year. Finegan played the 2006–7 season in Dublin with Bective Rangers and the Irish province Leinster, where he was coached by his former Randwick boss and teammate, Michael Cheika.

Finegan signed for English Rugby Union team Leicester Tigers, on a short term five-month contract as cover during the 2007 Rugby World Cup. He featured in many pre-season games and started the first game of the season against Bristol Rugby before picking up a groin injury which prevented him from making any more appearances.

== Retirement ==
In 2008, Finegan returned to the ACT Brumbies as assistant coach.

Finegan, at one time played for Waverley Rugby Club.

Finegan is an Ambassador for the White Ribbon Foundation, an organisation committed to the elimination of violence against women.

In 2011, Finegan commenced the role of CEO of the Snowy Hydro SouthCare Rescue Helicopter Service. The helicopter is based in Canberra and provides aero-medical retrieval services for the ACT & Southern NSW. In 2015, Finegan commenced as the CEO of The Kids' Cancer Project, an independent national charity driven to supporting bold childhood cancer research. Since 1993, thanks to strong community support, the charity has committed over $36 million to scientific research projects to help children with many types of cancer.
