= Dan Crowley (rugby union) =

Australia international rugby union player

- Born: 28 August 1965 (age 61) Brisbane, Australia
- Height: 5 ft 9 in (1.75 m)

Rugby union career
- Position: Prop
Provincial / State sides
Years	Team	Apps	(Points)
- Souths Rugby
Super Rugby
Years	Team	Apps	(Points)
	Queensland Reds	124	
International career
Years	Team	Apps	(Points)
1989–1999	Australia	55	(5)

Dan Crowley (born 28 August 1965) is an Australian former rugby union player who played as a prop. He won 38 caps for the Australia national team and played over 100 times for the Queensland Reds during his rugby career. He is one of only 43 players who have won the Rugby World Cup on multiple occasions.

Crowley made his first appearance for the Wallabies at age 23 on 1 July 1989 in a match against the British Lions, which Australia won 30 points to 12. He also played in the two subsequent tests, which the Lions won. His next appearance for the Wallabies was at the 1991 Rugby World Cup which Australia went on to win. He earned two international caps in 1999 in tests against Ireland and Wales. He also played against Canada in Calgary the following year.

In 1995 he was capped twice for Australia for two games against Argentina, before heading to South Africa for the 1995 Rugby World Cup. He played in the losses to the Springboks and England. In 1997 he was capped on seven occasions for Australia, and then ten times during 1998. He was subsequently selected in Australia's 1999 Rugby World Cup squad for Wales. Crowley finished his international career as a double world champion, as his last game was the final against France, which Australia won 35 to 12. He was also named on the bench of the Wallaby Team of the Decade.

Crowley also worked as an undercover police officer with the Queensland Police Force, specialising in busting drug-rings on Queensland's Gold Coast. He writes of his experiences in his book Undercover Prop, and works as a motivational speaker. On some occasions, he was even working undercover during rugby tours in New Zealand.
