= Andrew Blades =

Australia international rugby union player

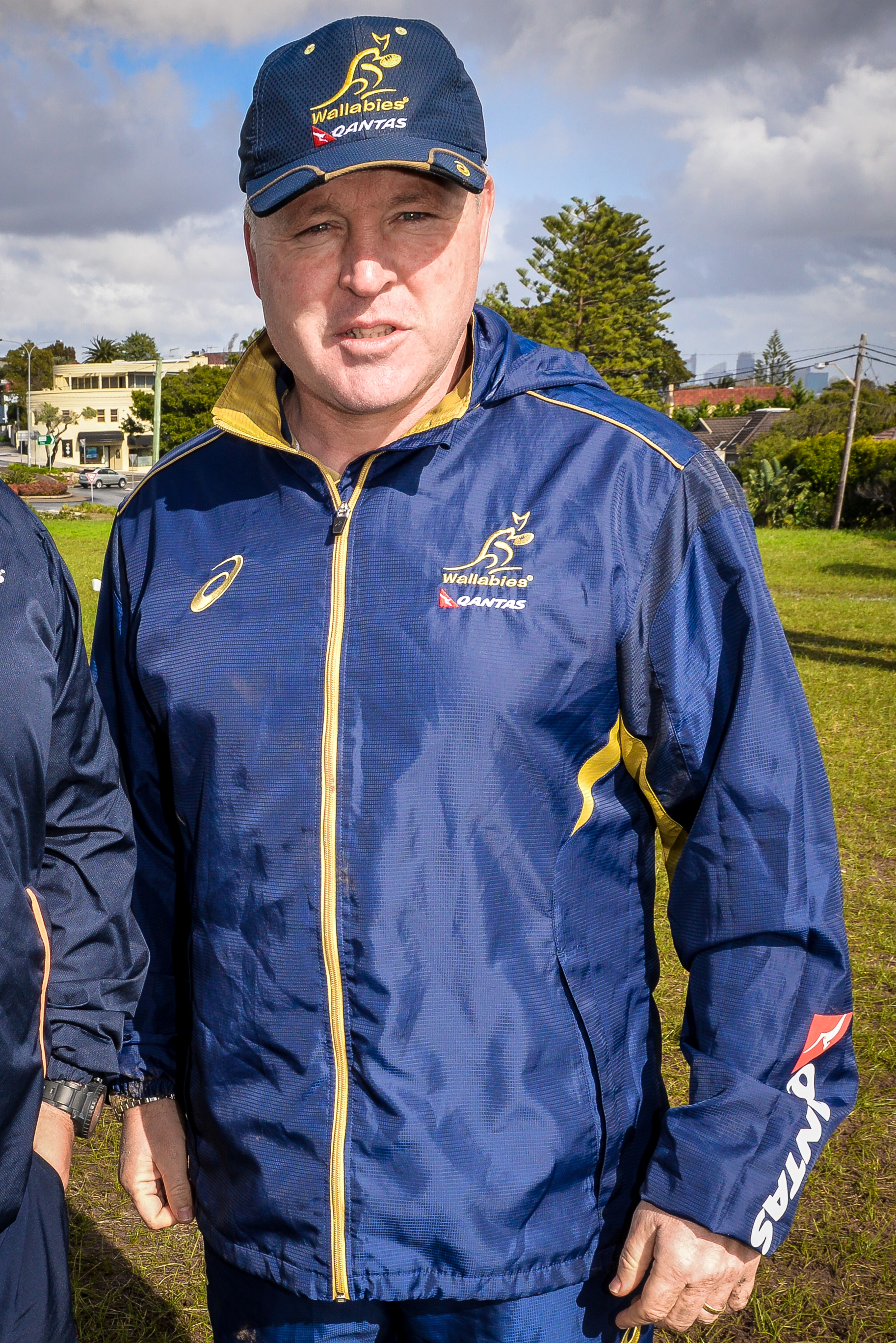
- Born: Andrew Thomas Blades; 4 June 1967 (age 59) Sydney, New South Wales, Australia
- Height: 1.75 m (5 ft 9 in)
- Weight: 110 kg (243 lb)
- School: Killara High School
- University: University of Technology – Kuringgai
- Notable relative: Cameron Blades
- Occupation: Rugby Coach

Rugby union career
- Position: Prop
Amateur team(s)
Years	Team	Apps	(Points)
1986-1994	Gordon RFC		
1995	Souths Rugby		
1996-1999	Gordon RFC		
Provincial / State sides
Years	Team	Apps	(Points)
1992-1994	NSW Waratahs	49	(4)
1995	Queensland Reds	11	
1996-1999	NSW Waratahs		
International career
Years	Team	Apps	(Points)
1992-1999	Australia	32	

Andrew Thomas Blades (born 4 June 1967) is an Australian former rugby union player. He played for the Australia national team from 1992 to 1999. Blades was first chosen for the Wallabies match 22 in 1992 against the All Blacks but did not get on the field. Later that year he toured with the Wallabies to South Africa and the United Kingdom playing in non-test matches. His first test cap was not achieved until 1996 against Scotland. His last game for Australia was their victory over France in final of the 1999 Rugby World Cup. After retiring from playing he became a coach, leading the Newcastle Falcons for two years before becoming the forwards coach for the Wallabies.

His brother Cameron also played for the Australia national team.
