= Matt Cockbain =

Australia international rugby union player

Matthew Cockbain
- Born: Matthew James Cockbain; 19 September 1972 (age 54) Coffs Harbour, New South Wales
- Height: 198 cm (6 ft 6 in)
- Weight: 108 kg (17 st 0 lb)
- Notable relative: Brent Cockbain (brother)

Rugby union career
- Position(s): Lock, flanker
Amateur team(s)
Years	Team	Apps	(Points)
1990–2003	GPS		
Senior career
Years	Team	Apps	(Points)
2004	Cardiff Blues	7	(5)
2004–06	World Fighting Bull		
2007	Melbourne Rebels (ARC)		
Provincial / State sides
Years	Team	Apps	(Points)
1995–2003	Queensland Reds	91	(35)
Super Rugby
Years	Team	Apps	(Points)
1997–2003	Reds	73	(30)
International career
Years	Team	Apps	(Points)
1997–2003	Australia	63	(5)
Coaching career
- Years: Team
- Melbourne Rebels (assistant coach)

Matt Cockbain (born 19 September 1972) is an Australian rugby union football coach and a former international player. He played over 60 tests for the national team, the Wallabies including winning the 1999 Rugby World Cup. Cockbain was an assistant coach to the Fijian national team on their 2014 end-of-year tour, and the forwards coach at the Melbourne Rebels from 2012 to 2014.

Cockbain began his professional career with the Queensland Reds in 1995. He made his debut for Australia in 1997 at Brisbane in a Test match against France. After a short stint with the Cardiff Blues in 2004, he played with World Corporation in Japan from 2004 to 2006 before returning to Australia to play for the Melbourne Rebels (ARC) team in the Australian Rugby Championship in 2007. He was called up as an injury standby for the 2007 Wallaby World Cup squad.

His brother, Brent Cockbain, played rugby union for Wales.
