= Ben Tune =

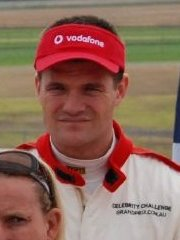
- Ben Tune in 2008
- Born: 28 December 1976 (age 49) Brisbane, Queensland, Australia
- Height: 185 cm (6 ft 1 in)
- Weight: 96 kg (212 lb)

Rugby union career
- Position: Wing / Centre
Senior career
Years	Team	Apps	(Points)
1996-2007	Queensland	84	(155)
International career
Years	Team	Apps	(Points)
1996-2006	Australia	47	(120)

Ben Tune (born 28 December 1976) is a former Australian rugby union player. He played most of his rugby career on the wing but later switched to outside centre.

== Early career ==
Tune was born in Brisbane and educated at St Paul's School, Bald Hills and played his junior rugby for Brothers/Teachers North. He went on to play for GPS Rugby. He played for the Queensland Reds in their inaugural Super 12 season in 1996, making his debut against the Highlanders.

== Wallabies ==
Tune made his test debut in 1996, playing Wales. Tune was an important member of the national side that claimed the 1999 Rugby World Cup in Wales, even scoring a try in the final against France. He returned to the Reds' lineup and retired after the 2007 season. He was named on the right wing in the Wallaby Team of the Decade. At the end of his career, Tune had scored 24 tries in 47 tests for the Wallabies.

== Post-playing career ==
He took a commentating position on Network Ten alongside Rupert McCall and former teammate Ben Darwin. in 2013, Tune went public about his mental health issues and suicide attempt (resulting in his being sectioned for 4 weeks), reporting, "I can honestly say I am now a relatively content man, who can actually get excited about a future I never thought I'd have."
