= 2001 Tri Nations Series =

Final positions
- Champions: Australia (2nd title)
- Bledisloe Cup: Australia

Tournament statistics
- Matches played: 6
- Tries scored: 13 (2.17 per match)
- Attendance: 314,356 (52,393 per match)

The 2001 Tri Nations Series was contested from 21 July to 1 September between the Australia, New Zealand and South Africa national rugby union teams. The Wallabies won another thrilling game at Stadium Australia in Sydney with number eight Toutai Kefu scoring a try at the death in captain John Eales' final test match, to successfully defend the Tri Nations trophy.

Australia made it four wins in a row in the Bledisloe Cup, having taken it from New Zealand in 1998.

== Table ==
| Place | Nation | Games | | | | Points | | | Try bonus | Losing bonus | Table points |
| Place | Nation | Played | Won | Drawn | Lost | For | Against | Diff | Try bonus | Losing bonus | Table points |
|---|---|---|---|---|---|---|---|---|---|---|---|
| 1 | Australia | 4 | 2 | 1 | 1 | 81 | 75 | +6 | 0 | 1 | 11 |
| 2 | New Zealand | 4 | 2 | 0 | 2 | 79 | 70 | +9 | 0 | 1 | 9 |
| 3 | South Africa | 4 | 1 | 1 | 2 | 52 | 67 | −15 | 0 | 0 | 6 |

== Results ==
=== Round 1 ===
21 July 2001
15:00 SAST (UTC+02)

| South Africa | 3–12 | New Zealand |
| Pen: Montgomery | | Pen: Brown (4) |

Newlands Stadium, Cape Town
Attendance: 49,720
Referee: Scott Young (Australia)

| FB | 15 | Percy Montgomery |
| RW | 14 | Breyton Paulse |
| OC | 13 | Robbie Fleck |
| IC | 12 | Marius Joubert |
| LW | 11 | Dean Hall |
| FH | 10 | Butch James |
| SH | 9 | Joost van der Westhuizen |
| N8 | 8 | Bobby Skinstad (c) |
| BF | 7 | André Venter |
| OF | 6 | André Vos |
| RL | 5 | Mark Andrews |
| LL | 4 | Victor Matfield |
| TP | 3 | Cobus Visagie |
| HK | 2 | Lukas van Biljon |
| LP | 1 | Robbi Kempson |
Replacements:
| PR | 16 | Ollie le Roux |
| HK | 17 | John Smit |
| LK | 18 | Johan Ackermann |
| FL | 19 | Joe van Niekerk |
| SH | 20 | Neil de Kock |
| WG | 21 | Deon Kayser |
| FB | 22 | Conrad Jantjes |
Coach:
Harry Viljoen

| FB | 15 | Jeff Wilson |
| RW | 14 | Doug Howlett |
| OC | 13 | Tana Umaga |
| IC | 12 | Pita Alatini |
| LW | 11 | Jonah Lomu |
| FH | 10 | Tony Brown |
| SH | 9 | Justin Marshall |
| N8 | 8 | Ron Cribb |
| OF | 7 | Taine Randell |
| BF | 6 | Reuben Thorne |
| RL | 5 | Troy Flavell |
| LL | 4 | Norm Maxwell |
| TP | 3 | Greg Somerville |
| HK | 2 | Anton Oliver (c) |
| LP | 1 | Carl Hoeft |
Replacements:
| HK | 16 | Mark Hammett |
| PR | 17 | Carl Hayman |
| LK | 18 | Chris Jack |
| FL | 19 | Marty Holah |
| SH | 20 | Byron Kelleher |
| FH | 21 | Andrew Mehrtens |
| FB | 22 | Leon MacDonald |
Coach:
Wayne Smith

=== Round 2 ===
28 July 2001
15:00 SAST (UTC+02)

| South Africa | 20–15 | Australia (1 BP) |
| Try: Skinstad; Pen: Van Straaten (5) | | Pen: Burke (4); Edmonds |

Loftus Versfeld Stadium, Pretoria
Attendance: 50,000
Referee: David McHugh (Ireland)

| FB | 15 | Conrad Jantjes |
| RW | 14 | Breyton Paulse |
| OC | 13 | Robbie Fleck |
| IC | 12 | Braam van Straaten |
| LW | 11 | Dean Hall |
| FH | 10 | Butch James |
| SH | 9 | Joost van der Westhuizen |
| N8 | 8 | Bobby Skinstad (c) |
| BF | 7 | André Venter |
| OF | 6 | André Vos |
| RL | 5 | Mark Andrews |
| LL | 4 | Johan Ackermann |
| TP | 3 | Cobus Visagie |
| HK | 2 | Lukas van Biljon |
| LP | 1 | Robbi Kempson |
Replacements:
| HK | 16 | John Smit |
| PR | 17 | Ollie le Roux |
| FL | 18 | Corné Krige |
| FL | 19 | Joe van Niekerk |
| SH | 20 | Neil de Kock |
| WG | 21 | Deon Kayser |
| CE | 22 | Thinus Delport |
Coach:
Harry Viljoen

| FB | 15 | Matt Burke |
| RW | 14 | Andrew Walker |
| OC | 13 | Daniel Herbert |
| IC | 12 | Nathan Grey |
| LW | 11 | Joe Roff |
| FH | 10 | Elton Flatley |
| SH | 9 | George Gregan |
| N8 | 8 | Toutai Kefu |
| OF | 7 | George Smith |
| BF | 6 | Owen Finegan |
| RL | 5 | John Eales (c) |
| LL | 4 | David Giffin |
| TP | 3 | Rod Moore |
| HK | 2 | Jeremy Paul |
| LP | 1 | Nick Stiles |
Replacements:
| HK | 16 | Michael Foley |
| PR | 17 | Ben Darwin |
| LK | 18 | Matt Cockbain |
| N8 | 19 | David Lyons |
| SH | 20 | Chris Whitaker |
| FH | 21 | Manny Edmonds |
| FB | 22 | Chris Latham |
Coach:
Eddie Jones

=== Round 3 ===
11 August 2001
19:35 NZST (UTC+12)

| New Zealand | 15–23 | Australia |
| Try: Lomu; Wilson; Con: Mehrtens; Pen: Brown | | Try: Burke; Penalty try Con: Burke (2); Pen: Burke (3) |

Carisbrook, Dunedin
Attendance: 36,000
Referee: Steve Lander (England)

| FB | 15 | Jeff Wilson |
| RW | 14 | Doug Howlett |
| OC | 13 | Tana Umaga |
| IC | 12 | Pita Alatini |
| LW | 11 | Jonah Lomu |
| FH | 10 | Tony Brown |
| SH | 9 | Justin Marshall |
| N8 | 8 | Ron Cribb |
| OF | 7 | Taine Randell |
| BF | 6 | Reuben Thorne |
| RL | 5 | Troy Flavell |
| LL | 4 | Norm Maxwell |
| TP | 3 | Greg Somerville |
| HK | 2 | Anton Oliver (c) |
| LP | 1 | Carl Hoeft |
Replacements:
| HK | 16 | Mark Hammett |
| PR | 17 | Carl Hayman |
| LK | 18 | Mark Cooksley |
| FL | 19 | Marty Holah |
| SH | 20 | Byron Kelleher |
| FH | 21 | Andrew Mehrtens |
| FB | 22 | Leon MacDonald |
Coach:
Wayne Smith

| FB | 15 | Matt Burke |
| RW | 14 | Andrew Walker |
| OC | 13 | Daniel Herbert |
| IC | 12 | Nathan Grey |
| LW | 11 | Joe Roff |
| FH | 10 | Stephen Larkham |
| SH | 9 | George Gregan |
| N8 | 8 | Toutai Kefu |
| OF | 7 | George Smith |
| BF | 6 | Owen Finegan |
| RL | 5 | John Eales (c) |
| LL | 4 | Justin Harrison |
| TP | 3 | Rod Moore |
| HK | 2 | Michael Foley |
| LP | 1 | Nick Stiles |
Replacements:
| HK | 16 | Brendan Cannon |
| PR | 17 | Ben Darwin |
| LK | 18 | Matt Cockbain |
| FL | 19 | Phil Waugh |
| SH | 20 | Chris Whitaker |
| FH | 21 | Elton Flatley |
| FB | 22 | Chris Latham |
Coach:
Eddie Jones

=== Round 4 ===
18 August 2001
18:00 AWST (UTC+08)

| Australia | 14–14 | South Africa |
| Try: Grey; Pen: Burke (3) | | Try: Andrews; Pen: Van Straaten (3) |

Subiaco Oval, Perth
Attendance: 42,658
Referee: Steve Walsh (New Zealand)

| FB | 15 | Matt Burke |
| RW | 14 | Chris Latham |
| OC | 13 | Daniel Herbert |
| IC | 12 | Nathan Grey |
| LW | 11 | Joe Roff |
| FH | 10 | Stephen Larkham |
| SH | 9 | George Gregan |
| N8 | 8 | Toutai Kefu |
| OF | 7 | George Smith |
| BF | 6 | Owen Finegan |
| RL | 5 | John Eales (c) |
| LL | 4 | Justin Harrison |
| TP | 3 | Rod Moore |
| HK | 2 | Michael Foley |
| LP | 1 | Nick Stiles |
Replacements:
| HK | 16 | Brendan Cannon |
| PR | 17 | Ben Darwin |
| LK | 18 | Matt Cockbain |
| FL | 19 | Phil Waugh |
| SH | 20 | Chris Whitaker |
| FH | 21 | Elton Flatley |
| CE | 22 | Graeme Bond |
Coach:
Eddie Jones

| FB | 15 | Conrad Jantjes |
| RW | 14 | Breyton Paulse |
| OC | 13 | Robbie Fleck |
| IC | 12 | Braam van Straaten |
| LW | 11 | Dean Hall |
| FH | 10 | Butch James |
| SH | 9 | Joost van der Westhuizen |
| N8 | 8 | Bobby Skinstad (c) |
| BF | 7 | André Venter |
| OF | 6 | André Vos |
| RL | 5 | Mark Andrews |
| LL | 4 | Victor Matfield |
| TP | 3 | Cobus Visagie |
| HK | 2 | Lukas van Biljon |
| LP | 1 | Robbi Kempson |
Replacements:
| HK | 16 | John Smit |
| PR | 17 | Ollie le Roux |
| FLK | 18 | Albert van den Berg |
| FL | 19 | Corné Krige |
| SH | 20 | Neil de Kock |
| WG | 21 | Deon Kayser |
| CE | 22 | Thinus Delport |
Coach:
Harry Viljoen

=== Round 5 ===
25 August 2001
19:35 NZST (UTC+12)

| New Zealand | 26–15 | South Africa |
| Try: Alatini; Penalty try Con: Mehrtens (2); Pen: Mehrtens (4) | | Pen: Van Straaten (5) |

Eden Park, Auckland
Attendance: 45,000
Referee: Peter Marshall (Australia)

| FB | 15 | Leon MacDonald |
| RW | 14 | Jeff Wilson |
| OC | 13 | Tana Umaga |
| IC | 12 | Pita Alatini |
| LW | 11 | Jonah Lomu |
| FH | 10 | Andrew Mehrtens |
| SH | 9 | Byron Kelleher |
| N8 | 8 | Ron Cribb |
| OF | 7 | Taine Randell |
| BF | 6 | Troy Flavell |
| RL | 5 | Chris Jack |
| LL | 4 | Norm Maxwell |
| TP | 3 | Greg Somerville |
| HK | 2 | Anton Oliver (c) |
| LP | 1 | Carl Hoeft |
Replacements:
| HK | 16 | Mark Hammett |
| PR | 17 | Carl Hayman |
| LK | 18 | Mark Cooksley |
| FL | 19 | Marty Holah |
| SH | 20 | Justin Marshall |
| FH | 21 | Tony Brown |
| WG | 22 | Doug Howlett |
Coach:
Wayne Smith

| FB | 15 | Conrad Jantjes |
| RW | 14 | Breyton Paulse |
| OC | 13 | André Snyman |
| IC | 12 | Braam van Straaten |
| LW | 11 | Dean Hall |
| FH | 10 | Butch James |
| SH | 9 | Joost van der Westhuizen |
| N8 | 8 | Bobby Skinstad (c) |
| BF | 7 | André Venter |
| OF | 6 | André Vos |
| RL | 5 | Mark Andrews |
| LL | 4 | Victor Matfield |
| TP | 3 | Cobus Visagie |
| HK | 2 | Lukas van Biljon |
| LP | 1 | Robbi Kempson |
Replacements:
| HK | 16 | John Smit |
| PR | 17 | Ollie le Roux |
| FLK | 18 | Albert van den Berg |
| FL | 19 | Joe van Niekerk |
| SH | 20 | Neil de Kock |
| WG | 21 | Thinus Delport |
| CE | 22 | Deon Kayser |
Coach:
Harry Viljoen

=== Round 6 ===
1 September 2001
20:00 AEST (UTC+10)

| Australia | 29–26 | New Zealand (1 BP) |
| Try: Kefu; Latham; Con: Burke; Flatley; Pen: Burke (4); Walker | | Try: Alatini; Howlett; Con: Mehrtens (2); Pen: Mehrtens (4) |

Stadium Australia, Australia
Attendance: 90,978
Referee: Tappe Henning (South Africa)

| FB | 15 | Daniel Herbert |
| RW | 14 | Chris Latham |
| OC | 13 | Matt Burke |
| IC | 12 | Nathan Grey |
| LW | 11 | Joe Roff |
| FH | 10 | Stephen Larkham |
| SH | 9 | George Gregan |
| N8 | 8 | Toutai Kefu |
| OF | 7 | George Smith |
| BF | 6 | Owen Finegan |
| RL | 5 | John Eales (c) |
| LL | 4 | David Giffin |
| TP | 3 | Rod Moore |
| HK | 2 | Michael Foley |
| LP | 1 | Nick Stiles |
Replacements:
| HK | 16 | Brendan Cannon |
| PR | 17 | Ben Darwin |
| LK | 18 | Matt Cockbain |
| FL | 19 | Phil Waugh |
| SH | 20 | Chris Whitaker |
| FH | 21 | Elton Flatley |
| WG | 22 | Andrew Walker |
Coach:
Eddie Jones

| FB | 15 | Leon MacDonald |
| RW | 14 | Doug Howlett |
| OC | 13 | Tana Umaga |
| IC | 12 | Pita Alatini |
| LW | 11 | Jonah Lomu |
| FH | 10 | Andrew Mehrtens |
| SH | 9 | Byron Kelleher |
| N8 | 8 | Ron Cribb |
| OF | 7 | Taine Randell |
| BF | 6 | Troy Flavell |
| RL | 5 | Chris Jack |
| LL | 4 | Norm Maxwell |
| TP | 3 | Greg Somerville |
| HK | 2 | Anton Oliver (c) |
| LP | 1 | Carl Hoeft |
Replacements:
| HK | 16 | Mark Hammett |
| PR | 17 | Carl Hayman |
| LK | 18 | Mark Cooksley |
| FL | 19 | Marty Holah |
| SH | 20 | Justin Marshall |
| FH | 21 | Tony Brown |
| FB | 22 | Christian Cullen |
Coach:
Wayne Smith
