= 2001 British & Irish Lions tour to Australia =

- 2001 tour badge
- Date: 8 June – 14 July
- Coach: (New Zealand) Graham Henry
- Tour captain: (England) Martin Johnson
- Test series winners: Australia (2–1)
- Top test point scorer: (England) Jonny Wilkinson (36)
Summary
P	W	D	L
Total
10	7	0	3
Test match
3	1	0	2
Opponent
P	W	D	L
Australia
3	1	0	2

Tour chronology
- ← South Africa 1997 New Zealand 2005 →

The 2001 British & Irish Lions tour to Australia was a series of matches played by the British & Irish Lions rugby union team in Australia.

The Lions squad was captained by Martin Johnson, the first player to lead the Lions on two tours. The head coach was New Zealander Graham Henry. After winning the first of their matches against Australia, the Lions lost the remaining two matches of the test series. This was the first time that Australia defeated the Lions in a series. The tour was noted for tension between the test squad and the midweek squad as well as controversial newspaper columns written by scrum-halves Matt Dawson and Austin Healey, accusing the coaching staff of poor scheduling and training regimes and lack of team spirit.

== Squad ==
Player	Position	Date of birth (age)	National team	Club/province	National caps (Lions tests)	Notes
Iain Balshaw	Full-back		England	Bath		
Matt Perry	Full-back		England	Bath		
Ben Cohen	Wing		England	Northampton Saints		
Dafydd James	Wing		Wales	Llanelli		
Dan Luger	Wing		England	Saracens		
Jason Robinson	Wing		England	Sale Sharks		
Tyrone Howe	Wing		Ireland	Ulster		Injury replacement for Dan Luger
Mike Catt	Centre		England	Bath		
Will Greenwood	Centre		England	Harlequins		
Rob Henderson	Centre		Ireland	London Wasps		
Brian O'Driscoll	Centre		Ireland	Leinster		
Mark Taylor	Centre		Wales	Swansea		
Scott Gibbs	Centre		Wales	Swansea		Injury replacement for Mike Catt
Neil Jenkins	Fly-half		Wales	Cardiff		
Ronan O'Gara	Fly-half		Ireland	Munster		
Jonny Wilkinson	Fly-half		England	Newcastle Falcons		
Matt Dawson	Scrum-half		England	Northampton Saints		
Austin Healey	Scrum-half		England	Leicester Tigers		
Rob Howley	Scrum-half		Wales	Cardiff		
Andy Nicol	Scrum-half		Scotland	Glasgow		Injury replacement for Rob Howley
Jason Leonard	Prop		England	Harlequins		
Darren Morris	Prop		Wales	Swansea		
Tom Smith	Prop		Scotland	Brive		
Phil Vickery	Prop		England	Gloucester		
Dai Young	Prop		Wales	Cardiff		
Phil Greening	Hooker		England	London Wasps		
Robin McBryde	Hooker		Wales	Llanelli		
Keith Wood	Hooker		Ireland	Harlequins		
Mark Regan	Hooker		England	Bristol		
Gordon Bulloch	Hooker		Scotland	Glasgow		Injury replacement for Phil Greening
Dorian West	Hooker		England	Leicester Tigers		Called up as back-up after a number of injuries to the squad
Jeremy Davidson	Lock		Ireland	Castres		
Danny Grewcock	Lock		England	Saracens		
Martin Johnson (c)	Lock		England	Leicester Tigers		
Scott Murray	Lock		Scotland	Saracens		
Malcolm O'Kelly	Lock		Ireland	St Mary's College		
Neil Back	Back row		England	Leicester Tigers		
Colin Charvis	Back row		Wales	Swansea		
Lawrence Dallaglio	Back row		England	London Wasps		
Richard Hill	Back row		England	Saracens		
Scott Quinnell	Back row		Wales	Llanelli		
Simon Taylor	Back row		Scotland	Edinburgh		
Martyn Williams	Back row		Wales	Cardiff		
Martin Corry	Back row		England	Leicester Tigers		Injury replacement for Simon Taylor
David Wallace	Back row		Ireland	Munster		Injury replacement for Lawrence Dallaglio

== Results ==
Date	Home team	Score	Away team	Ground	Result
8 June	Western Australia	10–116	British & Irish Lions	WACA, Perth	Win
12 June	Queensland Presidents XV	6–83	British & Irish Lions	Dairy Farmers Stadium, Townsville	Win
16 June	Queensland Reds	8–42	British & Irish Lions	Ballymore, Brisbane	Win
19 June	Australia A	28–25	British & Irish Lions	North Power Stadium, Gosford	Loss
23 June	NSW Waratahs	24–41	British & Irish Lions	Sydney Football Stadium, Sydney	Win
26 June	NSW Country	3–46	British & Irish Lions	International Stadium, Coffs Harbour	Win
30 June	Australia	13–29	British & Irish Lions	The Gabba, Brisbane	Win
3 July	ACT Brumbies	28–30	British & Irish Lions	Bruce Stadium, Canberra	Win
7 July	Australia	35–14	British & Irish Lions	Colonial Stadium	Loss
14 July	Australia	29–23	British & Irish Lions	Stadium Australia	Loss

== Test series ==
=== First test ===
Jason Robinson scored the first try of the match, putting the Lions up 5–0. Andrew Walker successfully kicked a penalty for Australia's first points. The Lions scored through Dafydd James, which was converted by Wilkinson. The score at half-time was 12–3.

Brian O'Driscoll scored for the Lions in the second half. Wilkinson converted the try before kicking a penalty to make the score 22–3. Scott Quinnell then scored for the Lions, with Wilkinson converting. Grey then scored a try for Australia.

30 June 2001
19:00

Australia
Try:
- Grey 66' m
- Walker 68' m
Pen: Walker 18'
13–29
Report
British & Irish Lions
Try:
- Robinson 3' m
  James 32' c
  O'Driscoll 41' c
- Quinnell 50' c
Con: Wilkinson (3)
Pen: Wilkinson 44'

The Gabba, Brisbane
Attendance: 37,460
Referee: André Watson (South Africa)

FB	15	Chris Latham	(substituted off) 41'
RW	14	Andrew Walker
OC	13	Daniel Herbert
IC	12	Nathan Grey
LW	11	Joe Roff
FH	10	Stephen Larkham	(substituted off) 52'
SH	9	George Gregan
N8	8	Toutai Kefu
OF	7	George Smith
BF	6	Owen Finegan	(substituted off) 72'
RL	5	John Eales (c)	(substituted off) 61'
LL	4	David Giffin
TP	3	Glen Panoho	(substituted off) 61'
HK	2	Jeremy Paul	(substituted off) 52'
LP	1	Nick Stiles
Replacements:
HK	16	Michael Foley	(substituted in) 52'
PR	17	Ben Darwin	(substituted in) 61'
LK	18	Matt Cockbain	(substituted in) 61'
FL	19	David Lyons	(substituted in) 72'
SH	20	Chris Whitaker
FH	21	Elton Flatley	(substituted in) 52'
FB	22	Matt Burke	(substituted in) 41'
Coach:
Rod Macqueen

FB	15	(England) Matt Perry		(substituted off) 41'
RW	14	(Wales) Dafydd James
OC	13	(Ireland) Brian O'Driscoll
IC	12	(Ireland) Rob Henderson
LW	11	(England) Jason Robinson
FH	10	(England) Jonny Wilkinson
SH	9	(Wales) Rob Howley
N8	8	(Wales) Scott Quinnell		(substituted off) 61'
OF	7	(England) Richard Hill
BF	6	(England) Martin Corry	(yellow card) 61'
RL	5	(England) Danny Grewcock
LL	4	(England) Martin Johnson (c)
TP	3	(England) Phil Vickery	(yellow card) 74'
HK	2	(Ireland) Keith Wood	Substituted off
LP	1	(Scotland) Tom Smith		(substituted off) 74'
Replacements:
HK	16	(Scotland) Gordon Bulloch		Substituted in
PR	17	(England) Jason Leonard		(substituted in) 74'
FL	18	(Wales) Colin Charvis		(substituted in) 61'
FL	19	(Wales) Martyn Williams
SH	20	(England) Matt Dawson
SH	21	(England) Austin Healey
FB	22	(England) Iain Balshaw		(substituted in) 41'
Coach:
Graham Henry

=== Second test ===
The second test was played at Colonial Stadium in Melbourne. Wilkinson was successful with two penalty goals, giving the Lions a 6–0 lead. Burke then kicked a penalty goal for Australia. Neil Back scored the first try of the match, giving the Lions an 11–3 lead over Australia. Burke kicked another penalty goal to make the score 11–6 to the Lions.

Joe Roff scored a try for Australia in the second half, making the score 11–11. Burke kicked a penalty goal to give Australia the lead. The score became 21–11 when Roff scored his second try. Wilkinson then kicked a penalty goal to make it 21–14. Burke then scored a try for Australia, making it 29–14. Burke kicked another two penalty goals.

7 July 2001
19:00

Australia
Try:
- Roff (2)
- Burke
Con: Burke
Pen: Burke (6)
35–14
Report
British & Irish Lions
Try: Back
Pen: Wilkinson (3)

Colonial Stadium, Melbourne
Attendance: 56,605
Referee: Jonathan Kaplan (South Africa)

FB	15	Matt Burke
RW	14	Andrew Walker
OC	13	Daniel Herbert
IC	12	Nathan Grey
LW	11	Joe Roff
FH	10	Stephen Larkham
SH	9	George Gregan
N8	8	Toutai Kefu
OF	7	George Smith
BF	6	Owen Finegan
RL	5	John Eales (c)
LL	4	David Giffin
TP	3	Rod Moore
HK	2	Michael Foley
LP	1	Nick Stiles
Replacements:
HK	16	Brendan Cannon
PR	17	Ben Darwin
LK	18	Matt Cockbain
FL	19	David Lyons
SH	20	Chris Whitaker
FH	21	Elton Flatley
FB	22	Chris Latham
Coach:
Rod Macqueen

FB	15	(England) Matt Perry
RW	14	(Wales) Dafydd James
OC	13	(Ireland) Brian O'Driscoll
IC	12	(Ireland) Rob Henderson
LW	11	(England) Jason Robinson
FH	10	(England) Jonny Wilkinson
SH	9	(Wales) Rob Howley
N8	8	(Wales) Scott Quinnell
OF	7	(England) Neil Back
BF	6	(England) Richard Hill
RL	5	(England) Danny Grewcock
LL	4	(England) Martin Johnson (c)
TP	3	(England) Phil Vickery
HK	2	(Ireland) Keith Wood
LP	1	(Scotland) Tom Smith
Replacements:
PR	16	(England) Jason Leonard
HK	17	(England) Dorian West
FL	18	(England) Martin Corry
FL	19	(Wales) Martyn Williams
SH	20	(England) Matt Dawson
FH	21	(Wales) Neil Jenkins
FB	22	(England) Iain Balshaw
Coach:
Graham Henry

=== Third test ===
With the series tied at 1–1, the third test at Stadium Australia in Sydney was the decider and was refereed by New Zealander Paddy O'Brien. The scoring began in the third minute, when Burke successfully kicked a penalty for Australia, giving them a 3–0 lead. Wilkinson, who was under an injury cloud leading up to the match, levelled the scores in the fifth minute with a successful penalty goal. Burke then landed another penalty goal for Australia. Four minutes later, Burke kicked another penalty goal, giving Australia a 9–3 lead. Robinson scored the first try of the match, which was converted by Wilkinson, giving the Lions a 10–9 lead. Daniel Herbert scored Australia's first try which was converted by Burke, giving Australia a 16–10 lead. Wilkinson was successful with a penalty goal that made the score 16–13.

The Lions took the lead in the second half, with Wilkinson crossing the line to score a try and then converting it, giving the Lions a 20–16 lead. Herbert scored his second try in the 49th minute, Burke converted, giving Australia a 23–20 lead. Wilkinson kicked a penalty goal, levelling scores at 23–23. Burke was successful with a subsequent penalty goal five minutes after. Burke kicked another in the 76th minute, to make the score 29–23.

14 July 2001
19:00

Australia	29–23	British & Irish Lions
Try: Herbert (2); Con: Burke (2); Pen: Burke (5)	Report	Try: Robinson; Wilkinson; Con: Wilkinson (2); Pen: Wilkinson (3)

Stadium Australia, Sydney
Attendance: 84,188
Referee: Paddy O'Brien (New Zealand)

FB	15	Matt Burke
RW	14	Andrew Walker
OC	13	Daniel Herbert
IC	12	Nathan Grey
LW	11	Joe Roff
FH	10	Elton Flatley
SH	9	George Gregan
N8	8	Toutai Kefu
OF	7	George Smith
BF	6	Owen Finegan
RL	5	John Eales (c)
LL	4	Justin Harrison
TP	3	Rod Moore
HK	2	Michael Foley
LP	1	Nick Stiles
Replacements:
HK	16	Brendan Cannon
PR	17	Ben Darwin
LK	18	Matt Cockbain
FL	19	David Lyons
SH	20	Chris Whitaker
FH	21	James Holbeck
FB	22	Chris Latham
Coach:
Rod Macqueen

FB	15	(England) Matt Perry
RW	14	(Wales) Dafydd James
OC	13	(Ireland) Brian O'Driscoll
IC	12	(Ireland) Rob Henderson
LW	11	(England) Jason Robinson
FH	10	(England) Jonny Wilkinson
SH	9	(England) Matt Dawson
N8	8	(Wales) Scott Quinnell
OF	7	(England) Neil Back
BF	6	(England) Martin Corry
RL	5	(England) Danny Grewcock
LL	4	(England) Martin Johnson (c)
TP	3	(England) Phil Vickery
HK	2	(Ireland) Keith Wood
LP	1	(Scotland) Tom Smith
Replacements:
PR	16	(Wales) Darren Morris
HK	17	(England) Dorian West
FL	18	(Wales) Colin Charvis
FL	19	(Wales) Martyn Williams
FH	20	(Ireland) Ronan O'Gara
SH	21	(Scotland) Andy Nicol
FB	22	(England) Iain Balshaw
Coach:
Graham Henry

== Television coverage ==
In Australia, Seven Network and Fox Sports jointly televised the British & Irish Lions matches. In the United Kingdom and Ireland, matches were shown on Sky Sports.
