= Dean Hall (rugby union) =

South African rugby union player

- Born: Dean Bradley Hall; 2 September 1977 (age 49) Springs, South Africa
- Height: 1.85 m (6 ft 1 in)
- Weight: 103 kg (16 st 3 lb)
- School: Springs Boys High School
- Occupation: Business Owner Solo Chemicals

Rugby union career
- Position: Wing
Senior career
Years	Team	Apps	(Points)
- Pirates Rugby Club
2006–2007	Ricoh Black Rams	12	
Provincial / State sides
Years	Team	Apps	(Points)
1997–1998	Golden Lions U/21		
1997–2004	Golden Lions	57	
2005	Sharks (Currie Cup)	7	
2006	Natal Wildebeest		
Super Rugby
Years	Team	Apps	(Points)
2000–2003	Cats	26	
2005	Sharks	0	
International career
Years	Team	Apps	(Points)
2000	South Africa U/23	7	
2002	South Africa A	1	
2001–2002	South Africa	13	(20)

Dean Bradley Hall (born 2 September 1977) is a South African former professional rugby player. He played on the wing. He played the majority of his career for the Johannesburg based teams, the Golden Lions in the Currie Cup and Vodacom Cup and the Cats in Super Rugby. Later in his career he moved to Durban and played for the Sharks in the Currie Cup, the Natal Wildebeest in the Vodacom Cup and the Sharks in Super Rugby. He was also capped thirteen times for the Springboks and scored four test tries. His career was hampered with injury and he never reached his full potential. He was quite large for a wing, but in the wake of Jonah Lomu's sensation at the 1995 Rugby World Cup, it was hoped that Dean Hall would become the Springbok's massive wing.

== Early life and youth career ==
Dean Hall was born in Springs, in the Gauteng Province of South Africa on 2 September 1977. He went to Selection Park Primary School and then to Springs Boys High School. He played for Pirates Rugby Club in Gauteng. In 1996 Hall was selected for the South Africa U/23 team. He got selected for the under 23's again in 2000 when they competed in the African Rugby Championships. In 1997 and 1998 he played for the Golden Lions U/21 team, even though he got selected for the Golden Lions' senior team to play in the Currie Cup as early as 1997.

== Senior career ==
=== 1997 to 1998 ===
In 1997 while still eligible for age-group rugby, Hall was selected in the Golden Lions senior squad for the Currie Cup. He was not selected in the senior team in 1998, but continued to play for the Golden Lions U/21 team.

=== 1999 to 2000 ===
Hall started playing Currie Cup rugby in 1999 and became a regular starter for the Golden Lions in the Currie Cup as well as the Vodacom Cup. In 2000 he was selected for the Cat's Super Rugby squad. He went on to play 26 Super Rugby games for the Cats. He scored 20 tries for the Golden Lions in the Currie Cup season, which is fifth on the list of most tries scored in a season by a Lions player. In 1999, while Hall was part of the Golden Lions' team, they won the Currie Cup. Hall came on as a replacement during the final, which the Lions won 33-9 against the Sharks in Durban.

=== 2001 ===
In 2001 Hall continued to play Super Rugby for the Cats and gained instant fame when he flattened Highlanders back Iliesa Tanivula on his way to the tryline. This good form resulted in him being selected for the Springboks, ahead of veteran winger Pieter Rossouw. Jake White who was the Springboks' assistant coach at the time mentioned that Hall selection was to increase the skill level of the team in general and was viewed as a powerful statement of intent of Bok coach Harry Viljoen's plan to utilise the full width of the pitch in his game plan. On 16 June 2001, Hall made his test debut against France at his home ground, Ellis Park in Johannesburg. The Springboks lost the game 23-32. Hall was again in the team the following week at Kings Park in Durban when the Springboks changed it around and ran out winners, 20-15.

Hall played in all South Africa's Tri Nations games of 2001 Tri Nations Series, but failed to score a try. He was also selected for the Springboks' end of year tour to France, Italy, England and the USA. Hall scored his first test try in a 54-26 victory over Italy at the Luigi Ferraris Stadium in Genoa on 17 November 2001. His other try of the tour came against the USA at the Robertson Stadium in Houston, Texas.

=== 2002 to 2004 ===
From 2002 to 2003 Hall continued to play Currie Cup rugby for the Golden Lions and Super Rugby for the Cats. Hall fell out of favour with the Springbok coaches in early 2002 and Breyton Paulse was preferred at left wing with Stefan Terblanche at right wing in the mid-year tests against Wales and Argentina. He was selected to play in the South Africa A team which faced Argentina on 26 June 2002 in Witbank. A game South Africa A won 42-36, thanks to two tries scored by Hall. One of these tries came three minutes after the final hooter, to deny the Argentinians victory. Argentina led 36-35 before Hall's try. Paulse, coming back from injury, struggled with his form in the tests against Wales and Argentina and was replaced by Hall for the test against Samoa at Loftus Versfeld in Pretoria on 6 July 2002. Hall scored 2 tries in a 60-18 victory for the Springboks. He also played in the first Tri Nations game of the season, against the All Blacks at Westpac Stadium in Wellington. South Africa lost this game 41-20 with Hall picking up an injury. He was replaced by Paulse the following game against Australia in Brisbane. Hall played both games during the home leg of the tournament against Australia and New Zealand. The game against Australia on 17 August 2002 at Ellis Park turned out to be his last game in a Springbok jersey. Although he was part of the Golden Lions' Currie Cup squad during 2002, he was injured before the Currie Cup semi final and subsequently did not go on tour with the Springboks for their 2002 end of year tour.

In 2003 he was recovering from a serious knee injury. He formed part of the Cats' Super Rugby squad, but injuries kept him on the sidelines for the majority of his remaining career. He never fully recovered from this serious knee injury and was never again selected for the Springboks. According to one doctor who examined him in 2002, his knee cartilage had turned into that of a pensioners.

=== 2005 to 2007 ===
In a bid to revive his career, Hall moved to the Sharks. He was included in the Sharks' Super Rugby squad for 2005, but failed to make the team for any Super Rugby match. In 2006 he played Vodacom Cup rugby for the Natal Wildebeest and was part of the Currie Cup squad. In total he played seven games for the Durban-based team, including a Sharks Invitational XV who faced the Western Force in Pietermaritzburg in June 2006 in preparation for the Currie Cup.

At the start of the 2006/2007 Japanese season, Hall joined the Ricoh Black Rams in Japan. Hall went on to earn 12 caps for Ricoh during the season.

== After retirement ==
Hall has remained involved with rugby, being involved in rugby development in previously disadvantaged communities. In 2011 he was also involved in an Advanced Players and Coaches course at St Stithians College in Bryanston, hosted by The Investec International Rugby Academy, where young rugby players aged 16 to 18 spent time with top coaches and players.

He currently runs his own business Solo chemicals in Johannesburg

== Honours ==
Golden Lions

- Currie Cup: 1999
