= Deon Kayser =

South African rugby union player

- Born: Deon Jerome Kayser; 3 July 1970 (age 56) Uitenhage, South Africa
- Height: 175 cm (5 ft 9 in)
- Weight: 78 kg (172 lb)

Rugby union career
Provincial / State sides
Years	Team	Apps	(Points)
1996–1998	Eastern Province	43	(70)
2000–2004	Natal Sharks	50	(70)
2005	Eastern Province Elephants	2	
Super Rugby
Years	Team	Apps	(Points)
1998–2004	Sharks	49	(50)
International career
Years	Team	Apps	(Points)
1999–2001	South Africa	13	(25)
National sevens team
Years	Team		Comps
1998	South Africa 7s		2
Coaching career
- Years: Team
- 2009 - 2023: Sharks (under-19)
- 2023: Ąžuolas Kaunas (Lithuania)

Deon Jerome Kayser (born 3 July 1970 in Uitenhage) is a South African former rugby union player and current coach. He played as a wing.

== Career ==
Kayser made his senior provincial debut for Eastern Province in 1996 and at the end of the 1999 season he moved to the Sharks. He was called up for the Springboks during the test match at Durban on 19 June 1999 against Italy.

He was also part of the 1999 Rugby World Cup roster, where he took part in 5 matches, and played the 1999 and 2001 Tri Nations.

Until 2004, he played for the Sharks the following season with the Mighty Elephants, at the end of which he retired. Since 2009, he is technical consultant - and then coach of the Sharks' youth team.

=== Test history ===
No.	Opposition	Result (SA 1st)	Position	Tries	Date	Venue
1.	Italy	101–0	Replacement	3	19 Jun 1999	Kings Park, Durban
2.	Australia	6–32	Replacement		17 Jul 1999	Suncorp Stadium, Brisbane
3.	New Zealand	18–34	Wing		7 Aug 1999	Loftus Versfeld, Pretoria
4.	Australia	10–9	Wing		14 Aug 1999	Newlands, Cape Town
5.	Scotland	46–29	Wing	1	3 Oct 1999	Murrayfield, Edinburgh
6.	Spain	47–3	Replacement		10 Oct 1999	Murrayfield, Edinburgh
7.	Uruguay	39–3	Wing	1	15 Oct 1999	Hampden Park, Glasgow
8.	England	44–21	Wing		24 Oct 1999	Stade de France, Paris
9.	Australia	21–27	Wing		30 Oct 1999	Twickenham, London
10.	Italy	60–14	Replacement		30 Jun 2001	Boet Erasmus, Port Elizabeth
11.	New Zealand	3–12	Replacement		21 Jul 2001	Newlands, Cape Town
12.	Australia	14–14	Replacement		18 Aug 2001	Subiaco Oval, Perth
13.	New Zealand	15–26	Replacement		25 Aug 2001	Eden Park, Auckland

== See also ==
- List of South Africa national rugby union players – Springbok no. 675
- List of South Africa national rugby sevens players
