= Mark Wilkinson (rugby union) =

English rugby union player

- Born: Mark James Philip Wilkinson; 21 November 1977 (age 48) Wokingham, England
- Height: 6 ft 3 in (1.91 m)
- Weight: 238 lb (108 kg)

Rugby union career
- Position: Centre
Amateur team(s)
Years	Team	Apps	(Points)
2001–2002	Darlington Mowden Park	10	(15)
- Correct as of 6 May 2013
Senior career
Years	Team	Apps	(Points)
2002–2006	Newcastle Falcons	16	(5)
- Correct as of 6 May 2013

Mark James Philip Wilkinson (born 21 October 1977) is an English former professional rugby union player. He spent his three-year professional career at Newcastle Falcons, alongside his brother, Jonny Wilkinson, predominantly playing as a Centre.

== Career ==
=== Early career ===
Born in Wokingham, Wilkinson played for National League 3 North side Darlington Mowden Park during the 2001/02 season, making 20 appearances and scoring 3 tries.

=== 2002–2006 ===
In August 2002, Wilkinson signed for Newcastle Falcons, where his brother, Jonny, was captain. He made his professional debut against Leeds Carnegie, playing as centre, but unusually, for that position, wearing the 15 shirt. His performance drew praise from then-manager Rob Andrew, who stated "It was a pretty big debut for someone who hasn't played higher than Third Division North before." He made his European Challenge Cup debut in a 27–8 defeat to Treviso, His first appearance at fly-half, would not prove successful, as Newcastle lost 20–0 against London Irish. By the end of that season, he had made six appearances in the league and five in the Challenge Cup. He would feature far less the following season, making just four league appearances and two in the European Challenge Cup, although he did score his first professional tries against Valladolid RAC in a 71–10 victory for the Falcons. He made five Premiership appearances in the 2004/05 season, with his Heineken Cup debut coming against Newport Gwent Dragons, playing at fly half in a 25–17 victory. 2005/06 would see him play just once, a brief appearance from the replacement's bench in a 27–18 defeat against Saracens.

=== Post-retirement ===
In 2006, Wilkinson retired from professional rugby, aged 28, to become the academy fitness and conditioning coach at Newcastle, at the same time Rob Bowen joined the club's academy. He remained in the post for three years, before departing the club in 2009. Two years after his departure, he started the Fineside clothing range alongside his brother.
