= Matt O'Connor (rugby union) =

Australia international rugby union & league player

- Born: Matthew Gerard O'Connor; 29 January 1971 (age 55) Canberra, Australia

Rugby union career
- Position: Centre
Senior career
Years	Team	Apps	(Points)
- ACT
1998–2001	Kubota		
International career
Years	Team	Apps	(Points)
1994	Australia	1	(0)
Coaching career
- Years: Team
- 2017–2018: Leicester
- 2016: Queensland Reds (interim)
- 2013–2015: Leinster
- 2010–2013: Leicester
- Rugby league career

Playing information
Club
Years	Team	Pld	T	G	FG	P
1997	Paris Saint-Germain	15	1	26	0	58

Matt O'Connor (born 29 January 1971) is an Australian professional rugby union coach and a former international player. He was recently the head coach of the Leicester Tigers. O'Connor has held head coaching positions with the Queensland Reds (co-head coach alongside Nick Stiles during 2016); at Irish province Leinster, where he won the Pro12 in 2013–14; and in a previous stint with Leicester, where he won the Premiership in 2013.

== Playing career ==
O'Connor played rugby for the ACT in the 1990s and was awarded a single cap for Australia against Ireland in 1994.

He signed for rugby league club the Hunter Mariners in 1996, but the club's existence was threatened by the Super League war, so he played in only several trial matches that year. He played for Paris Saint-Germain in 1997. O'Connor spent three years in Japan playing for and then coaching Kubota Rugby Team. He lived in Japan with his wife and three children.

== Coaching ==
Returning to Australia, O'Connor joined the Brumbies as a backline coach in Canberra. He was appointed head coach of Australia A for the Pacific Nations Cup competition.

O'Connor joined the Leicester Tigers as the backline coach under Heyneke Meyer, replacing another Australian former centre, Pat Howard. Leicester won the English Premiership in 2009. O'Connor remained as attack coach when Richard Cockerill took over as head coach for the following season with the club going on to win the Premiership again in 2010. Cockerill was promoted to the position of director of rugby and O'Connor was appointed head coach of Leicester in July 2010, and he was extremely influential in the Tigers Premiership win of 2013.

He was signed as the head coach of Irish province Leinster in 2013, and won the 2013–14 Pro12 title in his first season. The following season, when the team missed out on a play-off spot in the Pro12 and lost at the semi-final stage of the Champions Cup, O'Connor was sacked by Leinster after completing two years of a three-year contract.

O'Connor joined the Queensland Reds as attack coach for 2016. After Richard Graham was sacked two games into the season, O'Connor was appointed as co-interim head coach of the team alongside Nick Stiles.

In March 2017, following the sacking of Richard Cockerill as director of rugby in January, Leicester Tigers announced that O'Connor would return to the club as head coach, with current head coach Aaron Mauger leaving with immediate effect. On 3 September 2018 it was announced O'Connor had left Leicester with immediate effect.

Preceded by Joe Schmidt	Leinster Rugby coach 2013–2015	Succeeded by Leo Cullen
