= Conrad Jantjes =

South African rugby union player

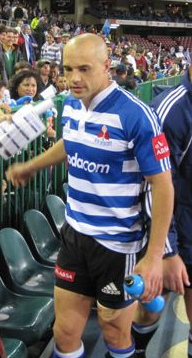
- Full name: Conrad Alcon Jantjes
- Born: 24 March 1980 (age 46) Boksburg, South Africa
- Height: 1.83 m (6 ft 0 in)
- Weight: 92 kg (203 lb; 14 st 7 lb)
- School: Christian Brothers' College, Boksburg
- Occupation: Professional rugby player

Rugby union career
- Position: Full back
Provincial / State sides
Years	Team	Apps	(Points)
2000–2005	Golden Lions	?	(?)
2007–2011	Western Province	36	(22)
- Correct as of 11 February 2011
Super Rugby
Years	Team	Apps	(Points)
2001–2006	Cats	?	(?)
2007–2011	Stormers	27	(65)
- Correct as of 11 February 2011
International career
Years	Team	Apps	(Points)
2001–2008	South Africa	24	(22)
- Correct as of 11 February 2011
Medal record
Men's rugby sevens
Representing South Africa
Commonwealth Games
Bronze medal – third place	2002 Manchester	Team competition

Conrad Alcon Jantjes (born 24 March 1980 in Boksburg, Gauteng) is a South African retired rugby union footballer who used to play primarily as a fullback for the Springboks in international rugby and the Stormers in Super Rugby. In the domestic Currie Cup he spent six seasons with the Golden Lions before switching to his final team, Western Province.

Former Springbok coach Harry Viljoen handed Jantjes his debut against Italy in 2001, but he fell out of favour before forcing his way back into contention during Jake White's reign as the team's coach.

He failed to win a place in the 2007 Rugby World Cup but found a new lease of life under coach Peter de Villiers, playing all South Africa's test matches in 2008.

However, despite looking like being South Africa's first choice full back for the 2009 British & Irish Lions series he broke his leg during the 2009 Super 14 season, and was sidelined for over a year until making a return to the 2010 Currie Cup.

Jantjes was born in a close-knit family as the only son and youngest of three children. He grew up with a love for all sports and represented South Africa not only in rugby, but also in both cricket and football at junior level.
