= Nathan Grey =

Nathan Grey may refer to:

- Nathan Grey (rugby union), Australian rugby union footballer
- Nate Grey, the X-Man, Nathaniel Grey
