= Jonny Wilkinson =

British Lions & England international rugby union player

Jonny Wilkinson CBE
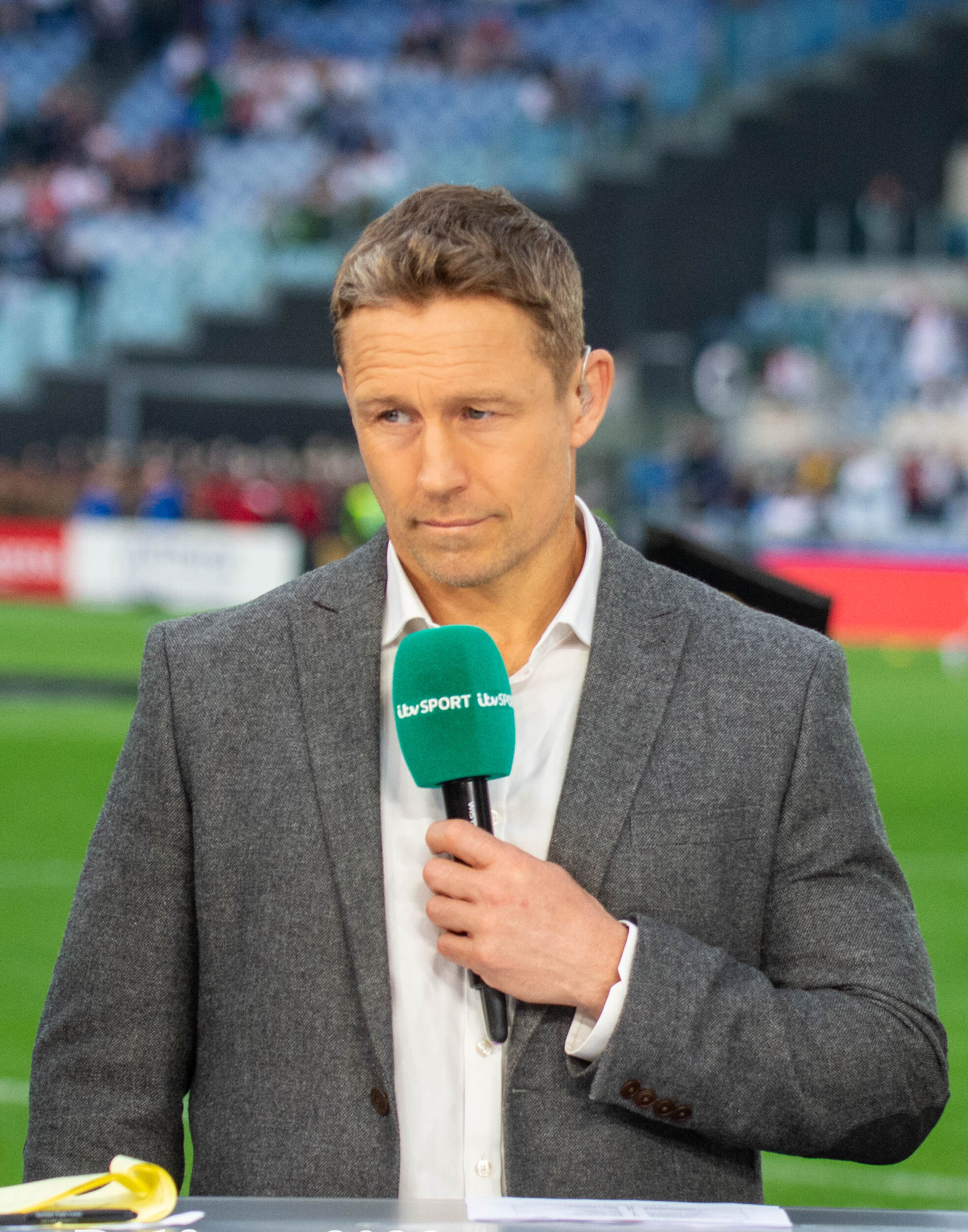
- Wilkinson with ITV Sport in 2026
- Born: Jonathan Peter Wilkinson; 25 May 1979 (age 47) Frimley, Surrey, England
- Height: 5 ft 10 in (1.78 m)
- Weight: 196 lb; 14 st 0 lb (89 kg)
- School: Lord Wandsworth College

Rugby union career
- Position: Fly-half
Amateur team(s)
Years	Team	Apps	(Points)
- Farnham
Senior career
Years	Team	Apps	(Points)
1997–2009	Newcastle Falcons	182	(2,049)
2009–2014	Toulon	141	(1,884)
1997–2014	Total	323	(3,933)
International career
Years	Team	Apps	(Points)
1998–2011	England	91	(1,179)
2001, 2005	British & Irish Lions	6	(67)

Official website
- http://www.jonnywilkinson.com

Jonathan Peter Wilkinson (born 25 May 1979) is an English former rugby union player. A fly-half, he played for Newcastle Falcons and French side Toulon and represented England and the British & Irish Lions. He is particularly known for scoring the winning drop goal in the 2003 Rugby World Cup final and is widely acknowledged as one of the best rugby union players of all time.

He played club rugby for twelve seasons in the English Premiership with Newcastle Falcons. In 2009, he moved to Toulon, where he won two Heineken Cups and one Top 14 championship in five seasons. He holds the record of top point-scorer at both clubs.

Wilkinson won 91 caps for England. He was an integral member of the England squad which won the 2003 World Cup, scoring the winning drop goal in the last minute of extra time against Australia in the final. He came back from several injuries and was part of the England team which reached the final of the 2007 World Cup. He toured twice with the British & Irish Lions, in 2001 to Australia and 2005 to New Zealand, winning 6 caps.

He retired from rugby at the end of the 2013–14 season. In 2016, he was inducted into the World Rugby Hall of Fame. Wilkinson is currently a studio pundit for ITV Sport, working on their coverage of the Six Nations Championship, Rugby World Cup and other rugby events.

== Early life ==
Wilkinson was born on 25 May 1979 at Frimley Park Hospital in Frimley, Surrey and grew up in Farnham. He attended Pierrepont School, Frensham and Lord Wandsworth College near Hook, Hampshire, and played at youth level for Farnham Rugby Club.

He gained a place at the University of Durham, but gave his place up in 1997 to become a professional rugby union player with the Newcastle Falcons.

== Career ==
=== 1998–2000 ===
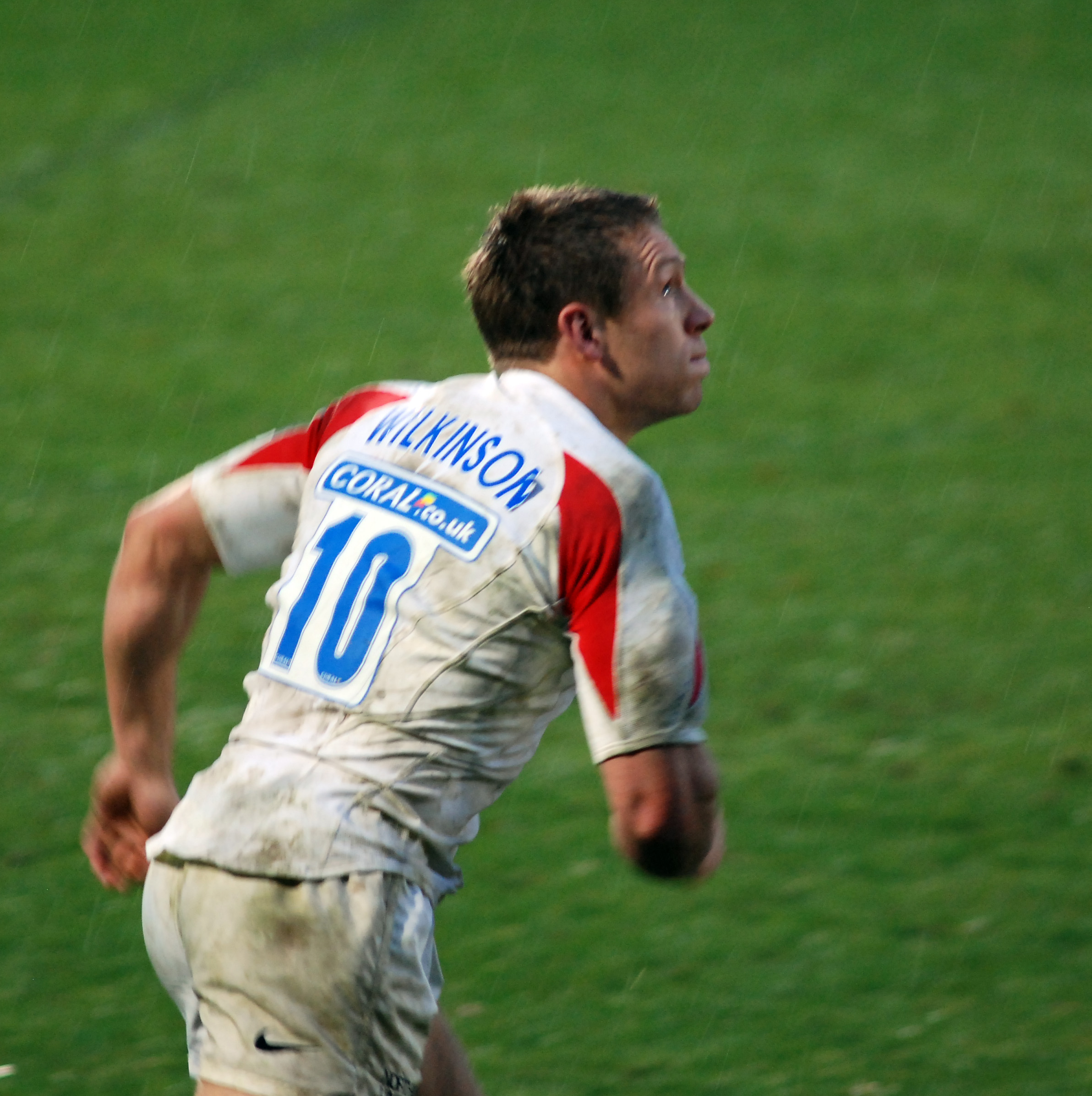
Wilkinson playing for Newcastle

Wilkinson started his career at Newcastle School of Rugby as an inside centre, competing for a place with international veterans such as Inga Tuigamala, and Lion Alan Tait. He became a fixture in a side that went on to win the 1997-98 Allied Dunbar Premiership title. By March 1998 he was in the full England Test squad. Wilkinson began his international career as an unused replacement against Scotland, before coming off the bench, replacing Mike Catt, to play on the wing against Ireland at Twickenham on 4 April 1998; he was only 18.

He then participated in England's "Tour of Hell" in June 1998 that saw them suffer heavy defeats to both New Zealand and Australia (who defeated them 76–0). Wilkinson returned to domestic duties by taking over from Rob Andrew, who was made Falcons head coach (later Director of Rugby), as both their fly-half and goal kicker. Wilkinson became a fixture in the England team, and started in all their matches in the 1999 Five Nations Championship. He played for the Falcons in their 1999 Tetley's Bitter Cup final defeat to London Wasps.

Wilkinson played for England in matches against Australia, the United States and Canada as the 1999 Rugby World Cup approached. He made his Rugby World Cup debut against Italy, scoring one try, converting another six and landing five penalty goals to rack up 32 individual points in the 67–7 win. After playing another pool game against the All Blacks, which England lost 30–16, he was rested against Tonga, a match won by England 101–10. Following the quarter-final playoff win against Fiji, Wilkinson was relegated to the bench for the quarter-final against South Africa. England lost the match by 44–21 and exited the tournament. Clive Woodward refused to expand on his selection choice at the time, and following the match some commentators blamed the head coach's lack of consistency in team selection as harming England's World Cup bid.

The following year Wilkinson played in all five of England's 2000 Six Nations Championship matches. England won the championship, however they missed a Grand Slam after losing their final match against Scotland. Wilkinson then toured South Africa with England in June 2000, kicking all of the points in their 27–22 win in Bloemfontein. He was then capped another three times for England during the end of year internationals.

=== 2001–2002 ===
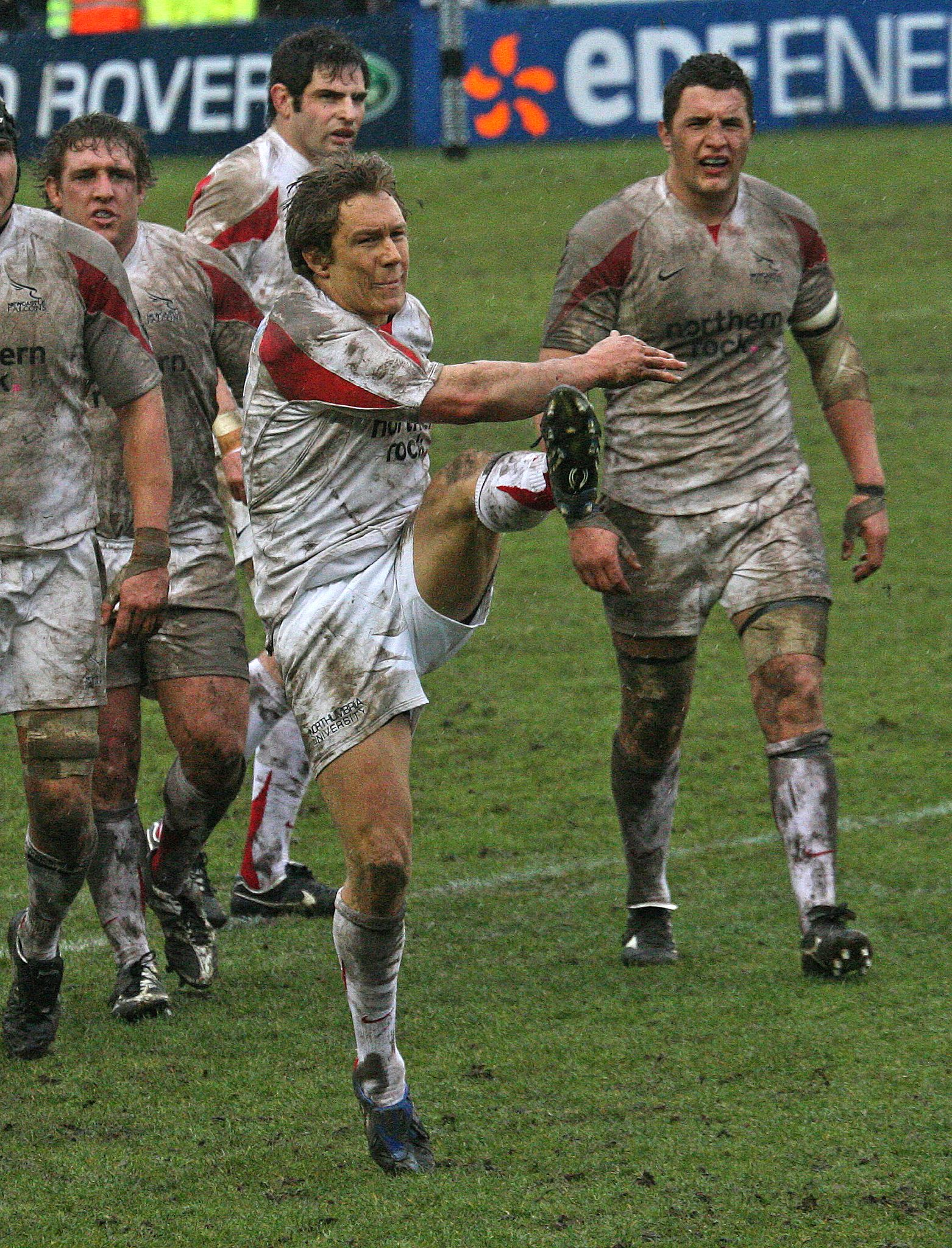
Wilkinson kicking for Newcastle

In 2001, England again won the Six Nations Championship. After the opening win over Wales, Wilkinson set an individual Six Nations Championship points scoring record with 35 points against Italy at Twickenham on 17 February, to overtake the record of his Newcastle Falcons mentor, Rob Andrew. England won all their subsequent matches during the tournament, with the exception of the Irish match, which was postponed until October.

More success followed for Wilkinson after the Six Nations, as the Falcons won the Powergen Cup: a late Newcastle try saw them defeat Harlequins by three points, by 30–27. As a result of Neil Jenkins suffering a number of injuries and a dip in form, Wilkinson was picked as the first choice fly-half and goal kicker for the 2001 British Lions tour to Australia in July. The Lions won the first test over Australia by 29–13 in Brisbane, in which Wilkinson scored nine points through his kicking.

The second test, on 7 July, saw the Lions lose 35–14 at the Docklands Stadium. Wilkinson was blamed by many for throwing a long pass inside his 22 that was intercepted by Joe Roff: this was seen as the turning point in the match, and probably the test series. During the match, Wilkinson injured his leg and was stretchered off the pitch. The injury was thought to be particularly serious, but he made a full recovery before the Third and final test on 14 July. Wilkinson's try at the start of the second half ensured that, along with his kicking scores, he equalled the Lions' best individual scoring total in a Test, with 18 points.

The incomplete 2001 Six Nations Championship was concluded in October, with England playing Ireland. England lost 20–14 at Lansdowne Road. Both Ireland and England had won four out of the five Six Nations fixtures, but England's superior points difference ensured they clinched the title although, for the second year running, not the Grand Slam. In a match against Australia for the Cook Cup in November, Wilkinson scored all of England's points in their 21–15 victory at Twickenham. After being rested as an unused bench replacement in the subsequent match against Romania, he then played a large role in a win over the Springboks, in which he kicked seven penalty goals in the 29–9 victory. Going for a third Six Nations title in a row, England got off to a good start in their 2002 Six Nations Championship with wins over Scotland and Ireland, before losing to France at the Stade de France. England won their remaining fixtures against Wales and Italy but France went on to complete a Grand Slam. The Falcons were in Pool 6 in the 2001–02 Heineken Cup, and won one match, finishing fourth in the pool.

In the November 2002 end-of-year tests England faced Australia, New Zealand and South Africa in subsequent weekends. Wilkinson played a large role in England's win over the All Blacks. He scored a try (although he commented later that the chip he kicked over the New Zealand defence was in fact meant for Jason Robinson to receive), and kicked two conversions and three penalty goals, as well as a drop goal. England then faced the 2002 Tri Nations Series champions Australia, who came to Twickenham on the back of a loss to Ireland. Two tries by winger Ben Cohen and Wilkinson's kicking accuracy saw England come back from a 19–31 deficit to defeat Australia by a single point in a 32–31 victory. England went into the last test against South Africa with the possibility of beating the Big Three rugby nations of the Southern Hemisphere on subsequent weekends, and defeated the Springboks by 53–3. Springbok Jannes Labuschagne was red-carded after 23 minutes for a late tackle on Wilkinson. The very physical match later saw Wilkinson leave the pitch with a dislocated left shoulder. The England camp believed that Wilkinson was targeted by South Africa during the game. His half-back partner Matt Dawson, who had also been forced off that match with an injury after being rammed by a Springbok player, later wrote in his autobiography Nine Lives that he felt South Africa had started out the match with the intent of injuring England players.

=== 2003 Six Nations and victory at the World Cup ===
The opening match of the 2003 Six Nations Championship saw France, the reigning champions and Grand Slam winners, play England. Both teams were high in confidence, following successes in their end of year tests against nations from the Southern hemisphere. Many saw this game as the tournament decider and England won the match 25–17. Now considered favourites to win the tournament, as well as a Grand Slam, England defeated Wales, Italy and Scotland. For the game against Italy, Wilkinson was chosen as the captain of the squad for the first time in his England career, as Martin Johnson was unavailable due to the birth of his first child. The final match was against Ireland at Lansdowne Road and would determine the tournament, and Grand Slam winner of 2003. By winning 42–6, England became the 2003 champions and serious contenders for the upcoming 2003 Rugby World Cup in Australia. Wilkinson was named Man of the Match.

After the Six Nations, England commenced a tour to the Southern Hemisphere, to play New Zealand and Australia in June. On 14 June and in difficult weather conditions, Wilkinson scored all 15 points as England beat New Zealand 15–13 in Wellington. He was also a major force in their 25–14 win over Australia a week later, which was their first ever victory on Australian soil. With England's 45–14 win over France in September, in which Wilkinson scored 18 points, England were now considered one of the favourites at the World Cup, set to start in October. Wilkinson was the youngest member of England's World Cup squad.

England's first match at the 2003 World Cup was at Subiaco Oval in Perth, where they defeated Georgia 84–6, with Wilkinson scoring 16 points from his goal kicking. He played a major role in the pool match against the Springboks, in which he scored 20 of England's 25 points, in the victory which held their opponents to just six. The subsequent match against Samoa in Melbourne was surprisingly close for the number-one-ranked rugby nation against a supposed "minnow" of international competition, but England pulled off a 35–22 win. Wilkinson was rested for England's final win against Uruguay. England finished at the top of Pool D, four points ahead of South Africa.

England moved into the quarter finals, where they met Wales at Suncorp Stadium in Brisbane. Aided by the arrival of Catt at half-time, Wilkinson went on to score 23 points in the match, which England won 28–17 to proceed to the semi-finals. England met France, whom they had beaten earlier that year on two occasions. England won 24–7, with Wilkinson scoring all of England's points through his kicking. In the final versus Australia, with the scores level at 17–17, Wilkinson received a pass and kicked a drop goal in extra time with just 26 seconds remaining; England won 20–17. The last time Australia had lost a World Cup match was eight years earlier in the 1995 Rugby World Cup, when Wilkinson's mentor Rob Andrew scored a drop goal at the stroke of full-time to win the game for England. After the match, Wilkinson expressed his relief at converting the winning drop goal, as it was his first success in four attempts during the match. The win gave England its first Rugby World Cup, and broke the Southern Hemisphere's dominance of the tournament. Wilkinson became the tournament's leading points scorer with 113 points. He was voted the BBC Sports Personality of the Year and also named the 2003 IRB International Player of the Year.

=== 2004–2005 ===
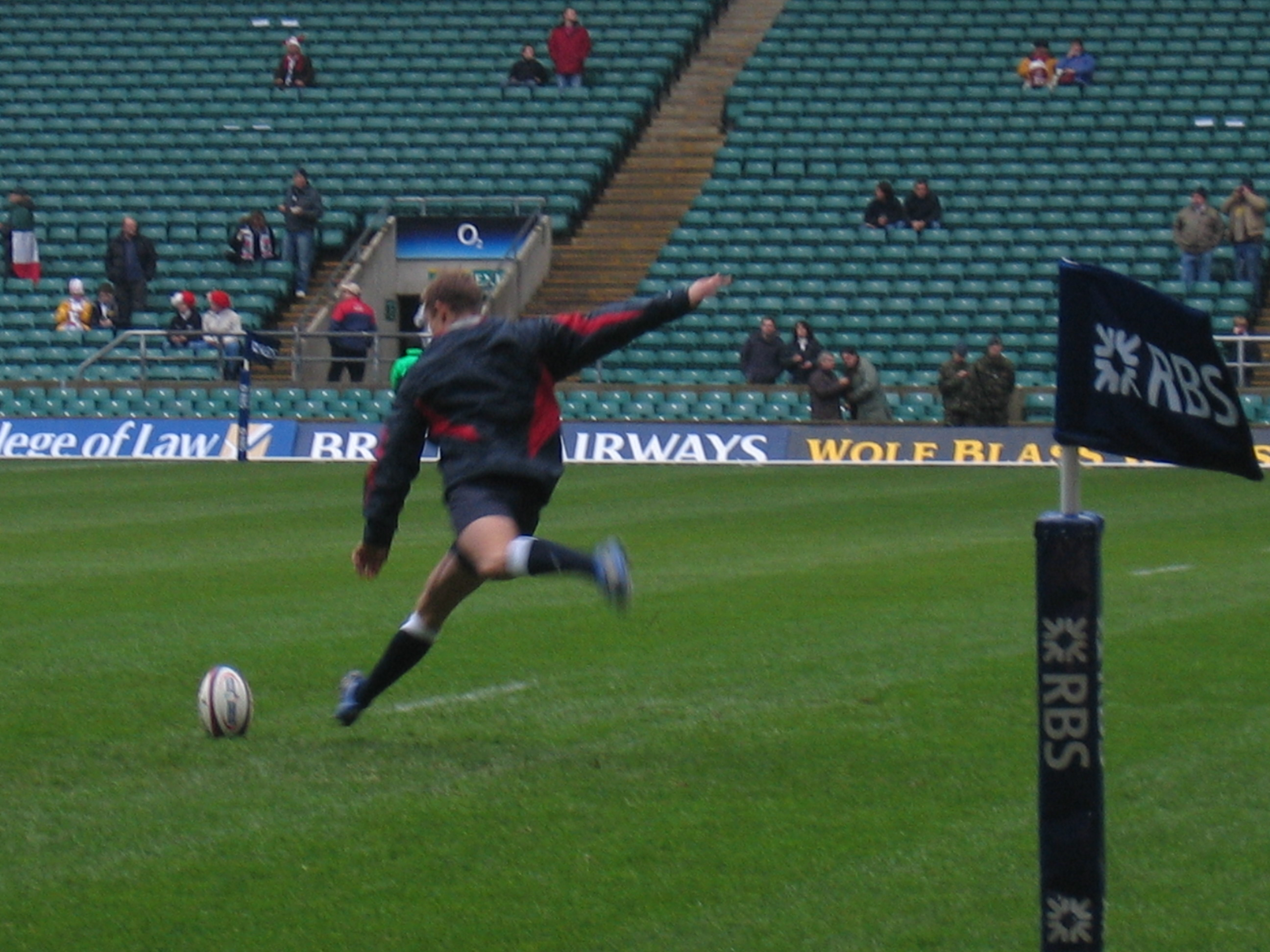
Wilkinson training before a Six Nations match

Within a couple of weeks of winning the World Cup, Wilkinson was found to have had a broken facet in his shoulder and missed the 2004 Six Nations Championship and the disastrous tour of New Zealand and Australia. He was named captain of the England team on 4 October 2004, replacing Lawrence Dallaglio, who had resigned five weeks earlier. However, he was kept out of the 2004 autumn internationals by a haematoma in his upper right arm, the captaincy being taken over by Jason Robinson and then Martin Corry. In January 2005, he injured his medial knee ligament in a match against Perpignan. He missed the opening matches of the 2005 Six Nations Championship and on his return to Newcastle on 13 March 2005 he injured the same knee again.

In almost 18 months, he had played a total of only 937.5 minutes of competitive rugby union, but was nonetheless given a chance to prove his fitness for the 2005 British & Irish Lions tour to New Zealand. Initially Wilkinson was left out of the 44-strong squad which was announced by Clive Woodward on 11 April 2005. However, on 8 May Woodward announced he had added the fly-half to the squad after Wilkinson had proved he was injury-free and fit. Wilkinson made his first international appearance since the 2003 Rugby World Cup Final on 23 May at the Millennium Stadium in Cardiff as the Lions played Argentina. Wilkinson, along with the rest of the team, played poorly, but he kicked a conversion and six penalties and salvaged a 25–25 draw with the last kick of the game.

Wilkinson's next international appearance was in the Lions' first test against New Zealand, starting at inside centre. Wilkinson scored the Lions' only points in their comprehensive 21–3 defeat. In the second test, another heavy loss, he started in his normal fly-half position, but suffered a stinger injury, which ruled him out of the third test. Wilkinson was replaced by Stephen Jones in the final test.

Wilkinson had to forgo participation in the Falcons' August pre-season games in Japan due to appendicitis. Then, after having appeared in five successive matches for Newcastle, the injury litany continued in late November with surgery for a sportsman's hernia, which he himself associated with the strain of his heavy training sessions, often involving long kicking sessions.

=== 2006–2007 ===
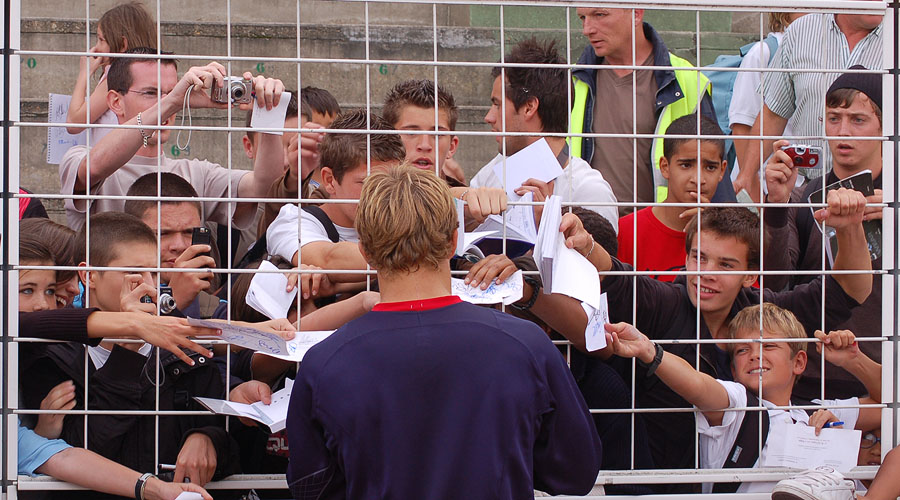
Wilkinson signing autographs, 2007

Rob Andrew, then Director of Rugby at Falcons, said that there was no chance of Wilkinson going on England's summer tour and that he would be taking the summer off. Despite missing two conversions, he demonstrated his playmaker skills in the game against the Worcester Warriors on 30 April, in which he played the whole second half. Afterwards, Andrew reiterated that Wilkinson should not tour during the summer to prolong his recovery period. Wilkinson started as captain in the Falcons last 2005-06 Guinness Premiership game of the season on Saturday, 6 May 2006, converting six of his team's eight tries in their 54–19 victory over Leeds Tykes.

Rob Andrew stated in July, pre-season to the 2006-07 Guinness Premiership, that Wilkinson would be ready to challenge for an England position come the November internationals. Captaincy of the Falcons was also given to former Wallabies fullback Matt Burke, a move that Andrew believed would allow Wilkinson to concentrate more on his game and a full return to rugby. In early August head coach of England, Andy Robinson announced the Elite Player Squad for the 2006–07 season, in which Wilkinson was included.

During the second game of the 2006-07 Guinness Premiership season against Worcester Warriors on Friday, 8 September, Wilkinson was helped from the pitch after 47 minutes with a knee injury incurred when one of his team members fell on him after he was tackled. A scan confirmed that he had torn the medial ligament of his right knee. He returned to play a full 80 minutes in the 26–21 win against leaders Bristol on Friday, 3 November, kicking a conversion, a drop-goal and two penalties. It was reported on 9 November that Wilkinson suffered a lacerated kidney during the match. He returned from this injury in the Premiership game against Leicester Tigers on 27 January 2007, coming off the bench after 37 minutes. On 29 January 2007, Wilkinson was selected at fly-half in the starting line up for England in their 2007 Six Nations Championship opener against Scotland. England comprehensively beat Scotland 42–20 to regain the Calcutta Cup, Wilkinson making an impressive return, scoring 27 points with five penalties, two conversions, a drop goal, and a try. This broke the previous Calcutta Cup individual record of 24, set by Rob Andrew. Wilkinson was awarded the RBS Man of the Match as adjudicated by BBC commentator, Brian Moore. In the following match against Italy at Twickenham, Wilkinson scored 15 points to become the highest individual point scorer in the history of the Five/Six Nations with 421 points.

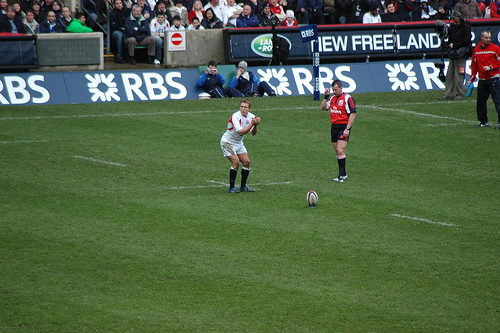
Wilkinson performing his familiar pre kick ritual

Despite another injury scare just before the match against Ireland on 26 February at Croke Park, Wilkinson started, scoring 8 points in the game which England lost 43–13. Wilkinson did not play in the two remaining Six Nations games against France and Wales due to the effects of a cramp that forced him off in the Premiership 38–12 defeat to London Irish on 3 March. On 13 April, he suffered a rib injury that forced him off during his fourth consecutive appearance for Newcastle in their 19–12 win over Gloucester.

Despite missing the season's last Premiership game against Bath, Wilkinson made the England squad for the summer tour and scored 5 points in the first test's record 58–10 loss to South Africa. He scored 17 points in the second test, which England lost 55–22. In the first of three warm up tests before the 2007 Rugby World Cup in France, Wilkinson had an impressive game, scoring 17 points (seven conversions and a penalty) in the 62–5 demolition of Wales.

=== 2007 World Cup ===
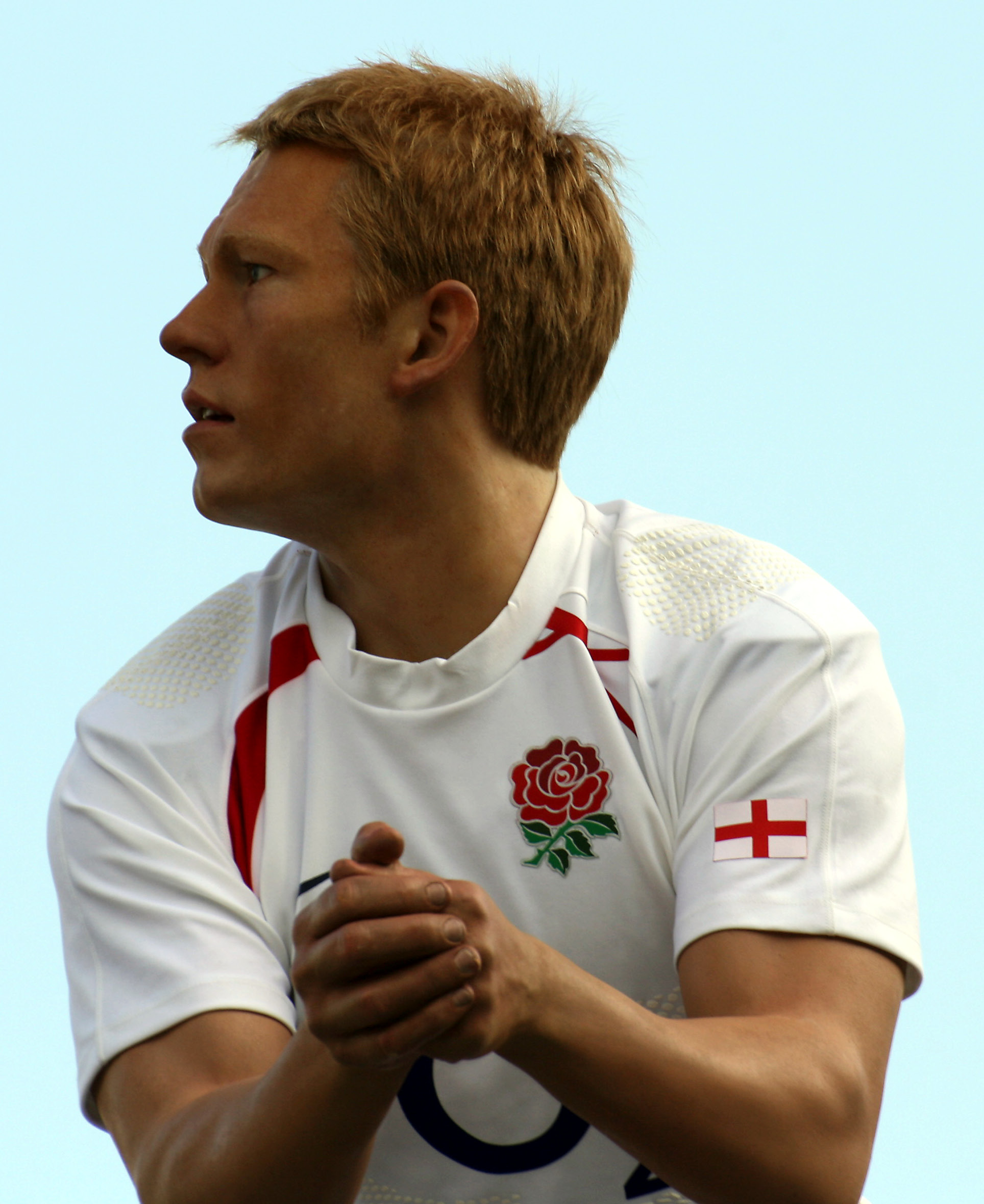
Wax figure of Jonny Wilkinson in Trafalgar Square in London before the 2007 Rugby World Cup Final in Paris

Due to a non-contact ankle injury sustained in training, Wilkinson was not included in the teams for the opening games of the 2007 Rugby World Cup against the United States and then South Africa. He returned to score 24 points in the 44–22 win over Samoa. He helped England to victory against Tonga which put them through to the quarter-finals. During England's 12–10 quarter final win against Australia, in which he scored all of England's points, Wilkinson became the Rugby World Cup's leading point scorer with 231 points, surpassing Gavin Hastings of Scotland. He continued to play a major role in England's defence of the World Cup by kicking 9 points, including a 40-metre drop goal in the dying minutes, in their 14–9 semi-final victory over France.

In the 2007 Rugby World Cup Final, on 20 October at the Stade de France, South Africa won the Webb Ellis Cup in a game where Wilkinson kicked two penalties, but missed two drop goal attempts. He was one of only four players to start both the 2003 and 2007 Rugby World Cup Finals, the other three being Phil Vickery, Jason Robinson and Ben Kay.

=== 2008–2009 international season ===
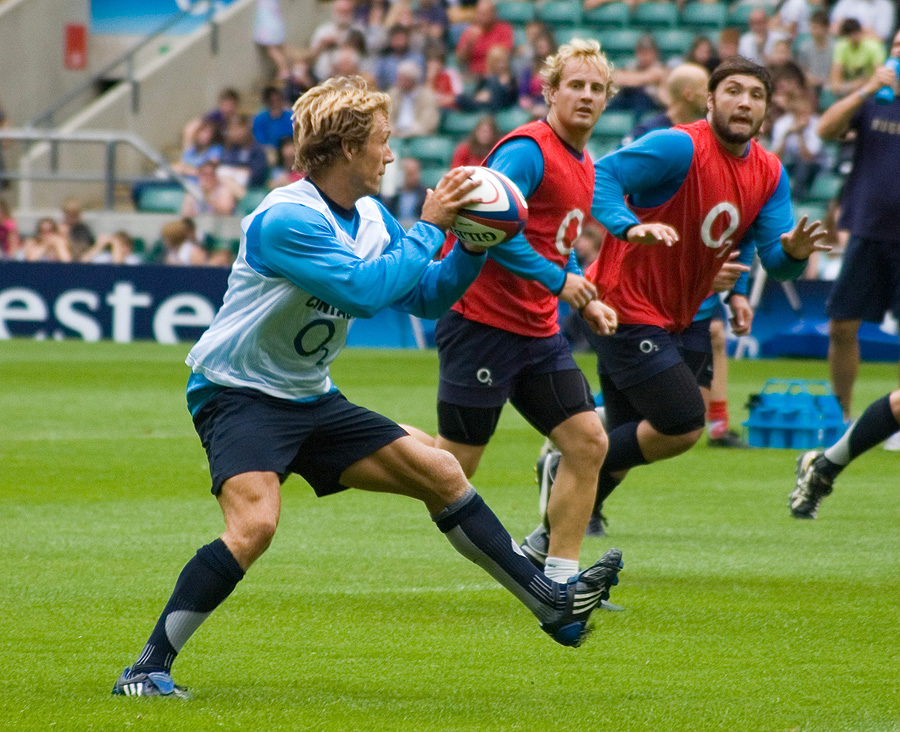
Wilkinson passing to his backline in training

Going into the 2008 Six Nations Championship, Wilkinson was the obvious choice as England's number 10 and started the first four matches. Against Wales on 2 February 2008, Wilkinson scored 14 points, but England put in a poor display to fall 19–26 after squandering a 10-point lead at half-time. Wilkinson then amassed 27 points in England's next two wins against Italy and France. A disappointing loss against Scotland on 8 March, in which a number of the England squad put in poor performances, raised questions about Wilkinson's inclusion in the starting line-up given the emerging English talents at the number 10 position. 20-year-old Danny Cipriani was the main back up stand-off throughout the tournament (along with Charlie Hodgson), and replaced Wilkinson in the starting line-up for the last match of the tournament against Ireland. This was only the second time in his England career that Wilkinson was dropped to the bench (the first time being for the 1999 Rugby World Cup quarter final match with South Africa for which Paul Grayson was preferred). However, close to the start of the second half during the Ireland match on 15 March, Wilkinson was brought off the bench to replace Toby Flood, thus playing alongside Cipriani at inside centre. This suggests a possible synthesis to the balance of nurturing up-and-coming fly-halves while incorporating the leading player in the position in recent years into the squad.

Following the Ireland match and speculation about Wilkinson's future as the England number 10, Lawrence Dallaglio expressed his opinion that Wilkinson was unlikely to let the position be handed to Cipriani from then on: the competition for the place was likely to inspire Wilkinson, rather than discourage him.

Despite competition over his position, Wilkinson ended the 2008 Six Nations as the tournament's top points scorer, with 50 points. He was not considered for Martin Johnson's first England squad (the 2008 summer tour of New Zealand) due to a shoulder injury. He was joined by Danny Cipriani on the sidelines after the Wasps player also missed out due to injury. On 1 July 2008, Wilkinson was named in Martin Johnson's Elite Player Squad and was the only specialist fly-half in the squad.

=== 2008–2009 Guinness Premiership season ===
Wilkinson made his recovery from shoulder surgery to score 22 points on his return game against Northampton on 14 September 2008, including a 45-metre last minute drop goal. Further sparkling performances and robust play indicated Wilkinson was playing injury free and back to his best. Unfortunately, the injury jinx struck again in the Guinness Premiership fixture against Gloucester on 30 September 2008. Wilkinson was forced off the field with a dislocated knee, which left him unavailable for England's autumn internationals and for the rest of the 2008-09 Guinness Premiership season. Wilkinson's injury facilitated a recall to the England squad for the Autumn Internationals for Danny Cipriani, who had returned from a serious ankle injury on 1 October 2008. In May 2009, it was confirmed that Wilkinson had ended his 12 years with the Falcons to join the French team Toulon for the 2009-10 Top 14 season.

=== 2009 autumn internationals ===
Wilkinson made a successful injury free comeback to international test rugby on 7 November against Australia after an 18-month absence. He then went on to play consecutive games against Argentina on 14 November and New Zealand on 21 November. Wilkinson along with Lewis Moody were England's most consistent performers as they lost to Australia and New Zealand and narrowly beat Argentina. During the first two games he was partnered with Shane Geraghty at inside centre for the third game he was partnered with Ayoola Erinle at inside centre.

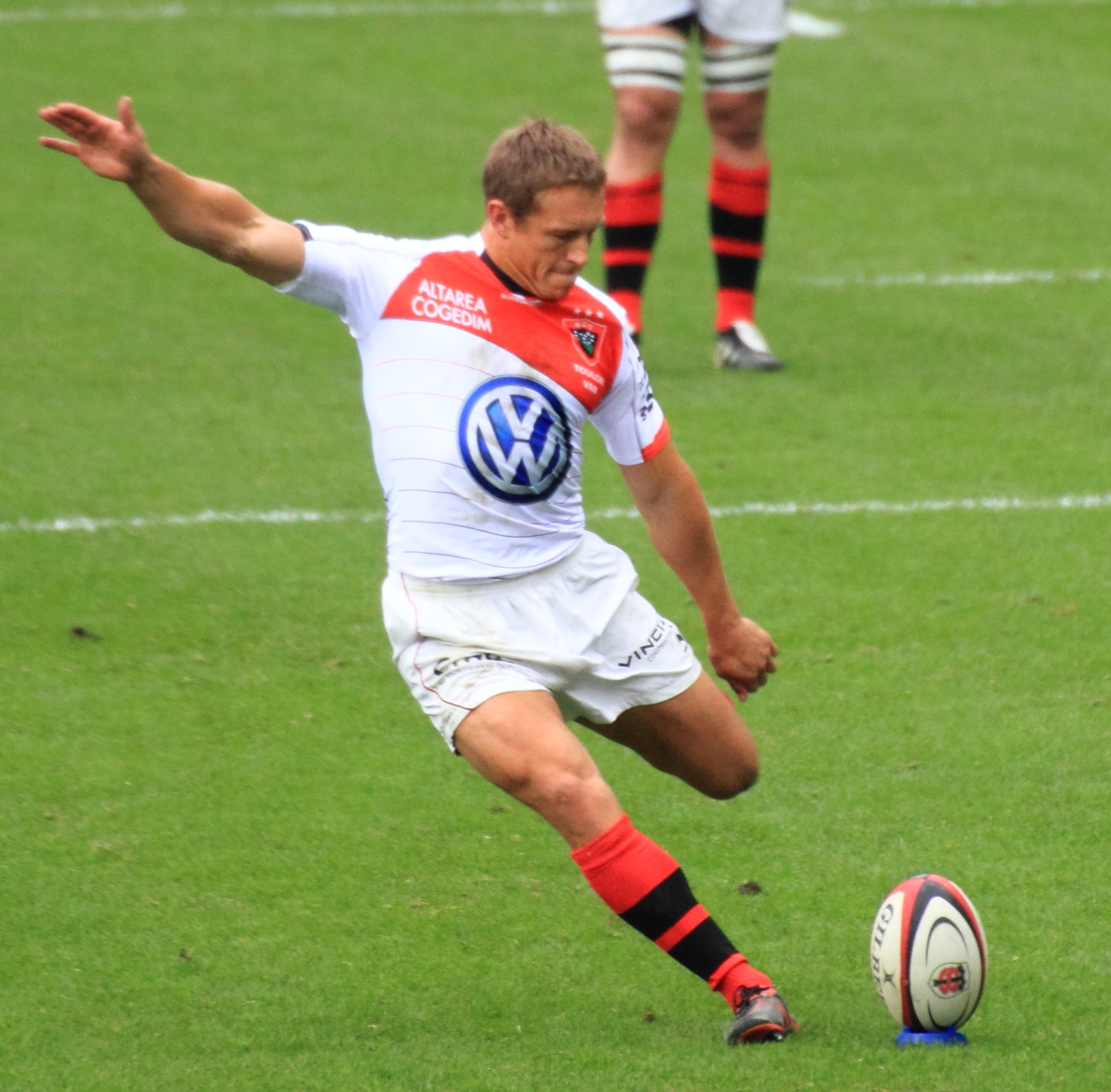
Wilkinson playing for Toulon

=== 2007–2014 ===
Because of a succession of injuries – affecting his knee ligaments, arm, shoulder and kidney – Wilkinson's international career was severely disrupted. He did not appear again for England until 1,169 days after the 2003 Rugby World Cup triumph, for the opening game of the 2007 Six Nations Championship against Scotland on 3 February 2007. In his comeback international match, Wilkinson scored 27 points (a record in the Calcutta Cup) in a full house (scoring points by all four possible methods), and was proclaimed Man of the Match.

The following week against Italy, he became the highest point-scorer in the history of the Five/Six Nations Championship (he has since been overtaken by Ronan O'Gara of Ireland). On 6 October 2007, he also became the highest point-scorer in the history of the Rugby World Cup, kicking four penalties to overtake Scotland's Gavin Hastings in a quarter-final against Australia.

In a 2008 Six Nations Championship match against Italy, Wilkinson became the first English player (and third overall) to score 1,000 Test points. He is also the world record drop goal scorer in international rugby with a total of 36. In March 2008, he became the highest international point-scorer, overtaking Neil Jenkins of Wales. In September 2008 he was injured again, ending his 2008-09 Guinness Premiership season.

In July 2009 he was recalled into the England Elite Squad for the first time since the 2008 Six Nations Championship and was confirmed in the squad for the 2009 Autumn internationals after a successful run of games with Toulon. Wilkinson was then selected to tour Australia with the elite squad but was not selected as first choice fly half, nevertheless Wilkinson landed the winning points in the second test between England and Australia. Injury forced him to miss out on the 2010 autumn internationals, in the process losing his position as the all-time leading points scorer in test rugby to Dan Carter. However, Wilkinson reclaimed the record during the 2011 Six Nations Championship, a tournament during which he came off the bench in each of England's five games. He again lost the record to Carter in July 2011. On 12 December 2011, he announced his retirement from Test Rugby.

=== Toulon ===
In May 2009 Wilkinson agreed to join French club Toulon on a two-year contract, leaving Newcastle after 12 years.

In April 2013 Wilkinson played the full 80 minutes in Toulon's Heineken Cup Quarter-Final, scoring all 21 points against Leicester Tigers. Wilkinson then landed 7 penalties and a drop goal to defeat Owen Farrell's Saracens. In May 2013 he scored 11 points as Toulon won the 2013 Heineken Cup Final by 16–15 against Clermont Auvergne. Wilkinson finished as the ERC European Player of the Year for the 2013 tournament, having not missed a single place kick in the knockouts with 17 from 17 attempts and finished with 56 points in the knockouts alone and 108 points in the entire tournament.

On 24 May 2014, he led Toulon to a decisive 23–6 win against Saracens in the 2014 Heineken Cup Final. He scored 13 points in the game. One week later on 31 May 2014, he led Toulon once again to another win in a final, this time the Top 14 Final against Castres in which Toulon won 18–10. Wilkinson kicked 15 points. This was the last match of his career. After the final whistle, supporters from both clubs sang "God Save the Queen" in tribute to him.

Wikinson's contribution to Toulon's success, increased experience and very high kicking success rate, included his leadership role within a multi-cultural team;

- "One of the reasons the team is so successful is because it’s driven by him. He’s the leader and he puts in more work than anyone but he’s incredibly humble. It’s a team full of superstars but they can’t let their egos get the better of them because Jonny’s in charge. He’s the most famous and the most talented but also the most grounded. In his team talks he speaks first in perfect French and then repeats it in English."

Wilkinson was the highest paid player in French rugby.

=== Retirement ===
In May 2014, Wilkinson announced that he would retire from all rugby at the end of the season.

== International records ==
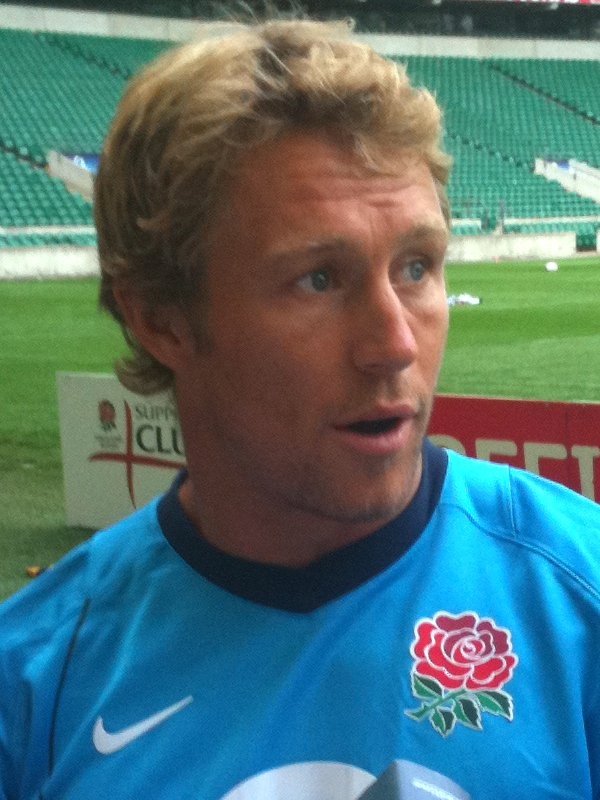
Wilkinson at Twickenham

England won 67 of the 91 games Wilkinson played in. Wilkinson scored a record 29th Test drop goal against France in the 2008 Six Nations Championship. His first converted penalty against Scotland on 8 March 2008, took him 3 points past Wales's Neil Jenkins tally of 1090 Test rugby points. This achievement came due to the IRB (now known as World Rugby) retroactively granting full Test status to the 2005 British & Irish Lions warm-up test against Argentina, in which he scored 20 points, without which he would have remained behind Jenkins on that day. Two more penalties in the second half took his tally to 1099 points.

On 26 February 2011, Wilkinson regained the record for the highest tally of International points, overtaking Dan Carter of New Zealand by scoring a penalty against France in a Six Nations match at Twickenham. Carter then reclaimed the record on 30 July 2011 in the second 2011 Tri Nations Series match against South Africa. Wilkinson passed Ronan O'Gara (522) to regain the overall points record total of 526 in the 2010 Six Nations Championship, on 13 March 2010. Wilkinson holds the Rugby World Cup points record with 277.

As of 2015, Wilkinson had made more tackles in world cups than any other back.

== Honours ==
In 2002, Wilkinson was appointed Member of the Order of the British Empire (MBE). In the 2004 New Year Honours, he was promoted to Officer of the Order of the British Empire (OBE). In the 2015 Queen's Birthday Honours, he was promoted to Commander of the Order of the British Empire (CBE) 'for services to Rugby Union'.

On 3 April 2009 at Guildford Cathedral, Wilkinson was awarded an honorary doctorate by the University of Surrey for services to the sports industry. Wilkinson announced his retirement from the English national squad in early December 2011.

On 17 November 2016, he was inducted into the World Rugby Hall of Fame at the opening ceremony for the Hall's first physical location in Rugby, Warwickshire.

=== Newcastle Falcons ===
- Premiership: 1997–98
- Powergen Cup: 2001, 2004

=== Toulon ===
- Heineken Cup: 2012–13, 2013–14
- Top 14: 2013–14

=== International ===
England

- Six Nations Championship:
  - Winner (4): 2000, 2001, 2003, 2011
- Grand Slam:
  - Winner (1): 2003
- Triple Crown:
  - Winner (3): 1998, 2002, 2003
- World Cup:
  - Winner (1): 2003

Runner up - 2007

== Statistics ==
=== International tries ===
Jonny Wilkinson's International Tries
Try	Opponent	City/Country	Venue	Competition	Year
[1]	Italy	London, England	Twickenham	Rugby World Cup	1999
[2]	Italy	London, England	Twickenham	Six Nations	2001
[3]*	Australia	Sydney, Australia	Stadium Australia	Test match	2001
[4]	Ireland	London, England	Twickenham	Six Nations	2002
[5]	Wales	London, England	Twickenham	Six Nations	2002
[6]	New Zealand	London, England	Twickenham	Test match	2002
[7]	Scotland	London, England	Twickenham	Six Nations	2007
*Try number three was scored while playing for the British & Irish Lions

=== International analysis by opposition ===
Against	Played	Won	Lost	Drawn	Tries	Points	% Won
Argentina*	4	3	0	1	0	53	75
Australia*	14	8	6	0	1	150	57.14
Canada	1	1	0	0	0	11	100
Fiji	1	1	0	0	0	23	100
France	14	9	5	0	0	161	56.25
Georgia	1	1	0	0	0	16	100
Ireland	11	7	4	0	1	107	63.64
Italy	9	9	0	0	2	148	100
New Zealand*	7	2	5	0	1	64	28.57
Romania	1	1	0	0	0	9	100
Samoa	2	2	0	0	0	39	100
Scotland	10	7	2	1	1	114	70
South Africa	9	5	4	0	0	127	55.56
Tonga	1	1	0	0	0	16	100
United States	1	1	0	0	0	26	100
Wales	11	9	2	0	1	182	81.82
Total	97	67	28	2	7	1246	69.07
*Includes matches played with the British & Irish Lions

Correct as of 18 August 2023

== Media ==
Wilkinson wrote a column for The Times occasionally until 2011, often during periods of high media focus on rugby, such as Six Nations tournaments and Rugby World Cups. He has also written five books, which have been published by Headline. The first, Lions and Falcons: My Diary of a Remarkable Year, written with ghostwriter Neil Squires who also helped Wilkinson in a few other books, was published in 2001, and followed a turbulent rugby year for him. The diary documented the England rugby players' strike, the Newcastle Falcons winning the Powergen Cup, the 2001 Six Nations Championship and the British & Irish Lions tour at the end of the year. After helping England win the Rugby World Cup with his last-ditch effort in 2003, he published his second book in 2004. The book, My World, was largely picture-based, with less text than in his previous book. The book focused on his experience of the 2003 World Cup, and how his life had altered following the winning drop goal.

In 2005 How to Play Rugby My Way, which accompanied the BBC series Jonny's Hotshots, was published. It was largely a coaching/instruction manual, with tips and techniques for rugby playing. It also included small insights into Wilkinson's family life and the relationships which have allowed his rugby playing to flourish. Wilkinson's next book, Tackling Life, was published in 2008. This book focuses on how his attitude to life changed after his injury woes, and how he overcame them. His fifth book, Jonny: My Autobiography, was published in 2011.

Since his retirement from playing, Wilkinson has appeared as a studio pundit for Sky Sports and ITV Sport, working on coverage of the Champions Cup, Six Nations Championship, Rugby World Cup and England Internationals.

== Coaches and mentors ==
Steve Black, the Newcastle Falcons' fitness trainer, was particularly influential on Wilkinson's rugby career. Wilkinson has previously stated that he respects Black a great deal, and that Black taught him a lot about "values and ethics".

Wilkinson also worked with kicking coach Dave Alred.

== Mental conditioning ==
Wilkinson has been open about managing the stresses he felt during his playing career.

== Personal life ==
=== Family ===
Wilkinson's older brother, Mark, was also a Newcastle player who made 16 appearances in the Premiership for the side between 2002 and 2005, predominantly as a centre. His father, Phil, was a rugby player and cricketer, and his mother, Philippa, played squash at county level.

On 28 October 2013, Wilkinson married his girlfriend of eight years, scaffolding company heiress Shelley Jenkins, in a private ceremony at the town hall of the French resort of Bandol, to the west of Toulon. Only two guests, one of them Wilkinson's mother, were present at the ceremony officiated by Bandol mayor Christian Palix, who said that "both [are] viewed with great respect" in the community.

=== Ventures ===
In September 2011, Wilkinson launched Fineside, an online men's fashion label.

In 2018, he founded kombucha company, No.1 Living, after brewing kombucha with his wife at home and discovering the benefits of a "living diet".

=== Attitudes and philosophy ===
Wilkinson followed Buddhist principles and teachings to help control his perfectionist tendencies, according to an interview he gave with The Times newspaper in 2009.

Wilkinson seeks to live consciously rather than reactively, and to embrace all the positive aspects of humanity such as acceptance, compassion and a true connection with others.

He is widely known as a teetotaller, but broke that habit after England lost to South Africa in the 2007 Rugby World Cup Final. Wilkinson seeks to eat natural foods, avoiding toxins.

=== Hobbies and interests ===
Wilkinson enjoys playing music, describing it as "very therapeutic". He and his brother Mark set up a studio in their home where Jonny would play the piano and Mark on drums.

He is an American football fan. In 2003, he contemplated playing in the National Football League; the San Diego Chargers also sent a scout to the 2003 World Cup final. The Wilkinsons have attended NFL International Series games at Wembley Stadium, and in 2009 was joined by Black in visiting the Denver Broncos' facility to research how NFL players trained. Wilkinson also pondered switching to football after his rugby career, but felt he would be "too tired to do anything" in retirement.

== Awards ==
In December 2005, Wilkinson was awarded an honorary doctorate in Civil Law by Northumbria University.

He was the 2003 BBC Sports Personality of the Year, the 2003 International Rugby Board (IRB) International Player of the Year and the 2013 (ERC) European Player of the Year.

In 2025, he was an inaugural inductee of the Stadium Australia Hall of Fame.

== See also ==
- List of top English points scorers and try scorers
- List of leading rugby union test point scorers

Sporting positions
Preceded by Martin Johnson	England national rugby union team captain Mar 2003	Succeeded by Martin Johnson
Preceded by Jason Robinson	England national rugby union team captain Jun 2007	Succeeded by Phil Vickery
