= Darren Morris =

Former Welsh rugby union player/current coach

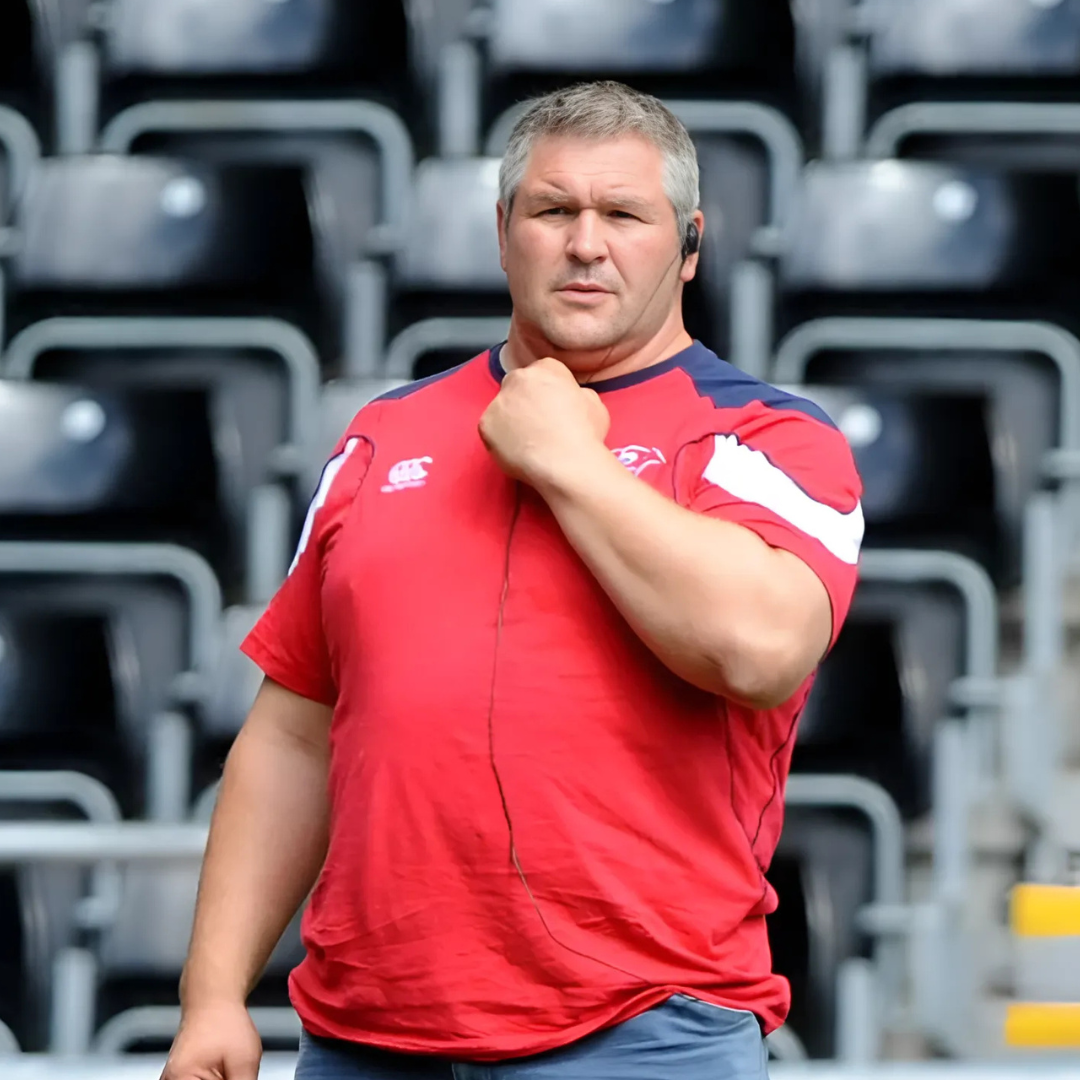
- At 2011 Rugby World Cup
- Born: 24 September 1974 (age 52) Aberdare, Wales
- Height: 6 ft 1 in (1.85 m)
- Weight: 19 st 2 lb (122 kg)

Rugby union career
- Position(s): Prop, Hooker
Amateur team(s)
Years	Team	Apps	(Points)
- Rhigos RFC, Brisbane Easts
Senior career
Years	Team	Apps	(Points)
1992–1998	Neath		
1998–2003	Swansea	120	(30)
2003–2006	Leicester	74	(5)
2006–2009	Worcester	64	(10)
2009–2010	Cardiff Blues	0	(0)
2010	Northampton Saints		
International career
Years	Team	Apps	(Points)
1998–2004	Wales	18	(5)
2001	British & Irish Lions	1	(0)
Coaching career
- Years: Team
- 2019-: Houston SaberCats (forwards)

Darren Morris (born 24 September 1974) is a Welsh former rugby union player who represented Wales and the British & Irish Lions as a prop. Over nearly two decades at the top level, he played for leading clubs such as Neath, Swansea, Leicester Tigers, Worcester Warriors, Cardiff Blues (now Cardiff Rugby) and Northampton Saints registering more than 300 senior appearances. He earned 18 caps for Wales between 1998 and 2004 and toured with the Lions in 2001, entering the third and final Test.

At club level, Morris won league titles with Neath and Swansea and captained Swansea in the 2002–03 season. He was noted by coaches and fitness staff for combining scrummaging strength and mobility, and his inclusion in the Lions Test squad underlined his standing among the foremost front-rowers of his generation.

After retiring from playing, he transitioned into coaching. He served as scrum coach for Russia (including at the 2011 Rugby World Cup), led club rugby in Krasnodar, and later moved to the U.S., working in Texas with Griffins Rugby, becoming Head Coach of Dallas RFC and joining Houston SaberCats in Major League Rugby as forwards coach in 2019. He remains actively involved in American rugby development.

== Early life ==
Morris was born on 24 September 1974 in Aberdare, Wales. He attended Aberdare Boys School and later studied at Neath College before enrolling at the University of Glamorgan (now the University of South Wales).

He began his rugby career with his local side Rhigos RFC, initially playing in the back row before converting to prop. His strength and technical ability soon marked him out as a front-row forward, and by the age of 18 he had joined Neath RFC in the Welsh Premier Division.

At youth level, Morris represented Wales Schools Under-18s, which he captained, before progressing to the Wales Under-19 and Wales Under-21 teams. Captaining the Welsh Schools U18s side was considered a notable achievement, as the team regularly produced future internationals and Lions players, underlining Morris’s status as one of the country’s leading young prospects.

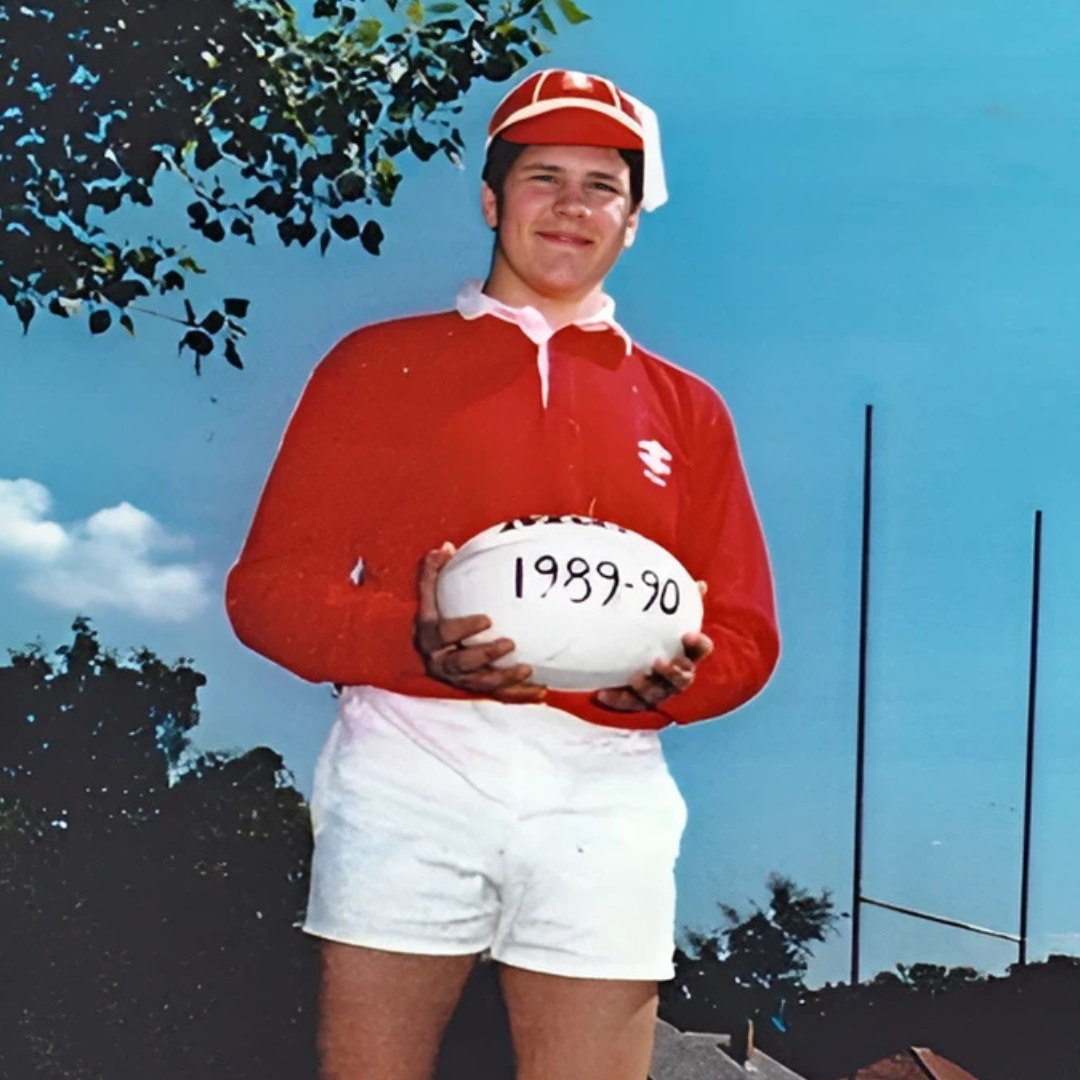
Darren Morris, Wales Schools Under-15s.

== Club career ==
=== Neath (1992–1998) ===
Morris joined Neath RFC in 1992 at the age of 18, where he initially played at tighthead prop. Over six seasons he became a key figure in the pack, making more than 100 appearances and helping Neath win the Welsh Premier Division in 1995–96.

During this period he also spent a season in Australia with Eastern Suburbs (Brisbane), reaching the Queensland Premier Rugby Grand Final in 1995, and trained with the Queensland Reds squad. This experience exposed him to the faster Southern Hemisphere style of play and broadened his technical development.

It was at Neath that Morris began the unusual transition from tighthead to loosehead prop. Few players succeed in playing both positions at elite level, but his versatility became a hallmark of his career and would later help earn him selection for the British & Irish Lions.

=== Swansea (1998–2003) ===
In 1998 Morris transferred to Swansea RFC, where he became a first-choice loosehead and established himself as one of the leading scrummagers in Welsh rugby. He played a central role as Swansea won the Welsh Cup in 1999, defeating Llanelli 37–0 in the final, and as the club secured the Welsh-Scottish League title in 2000–01.

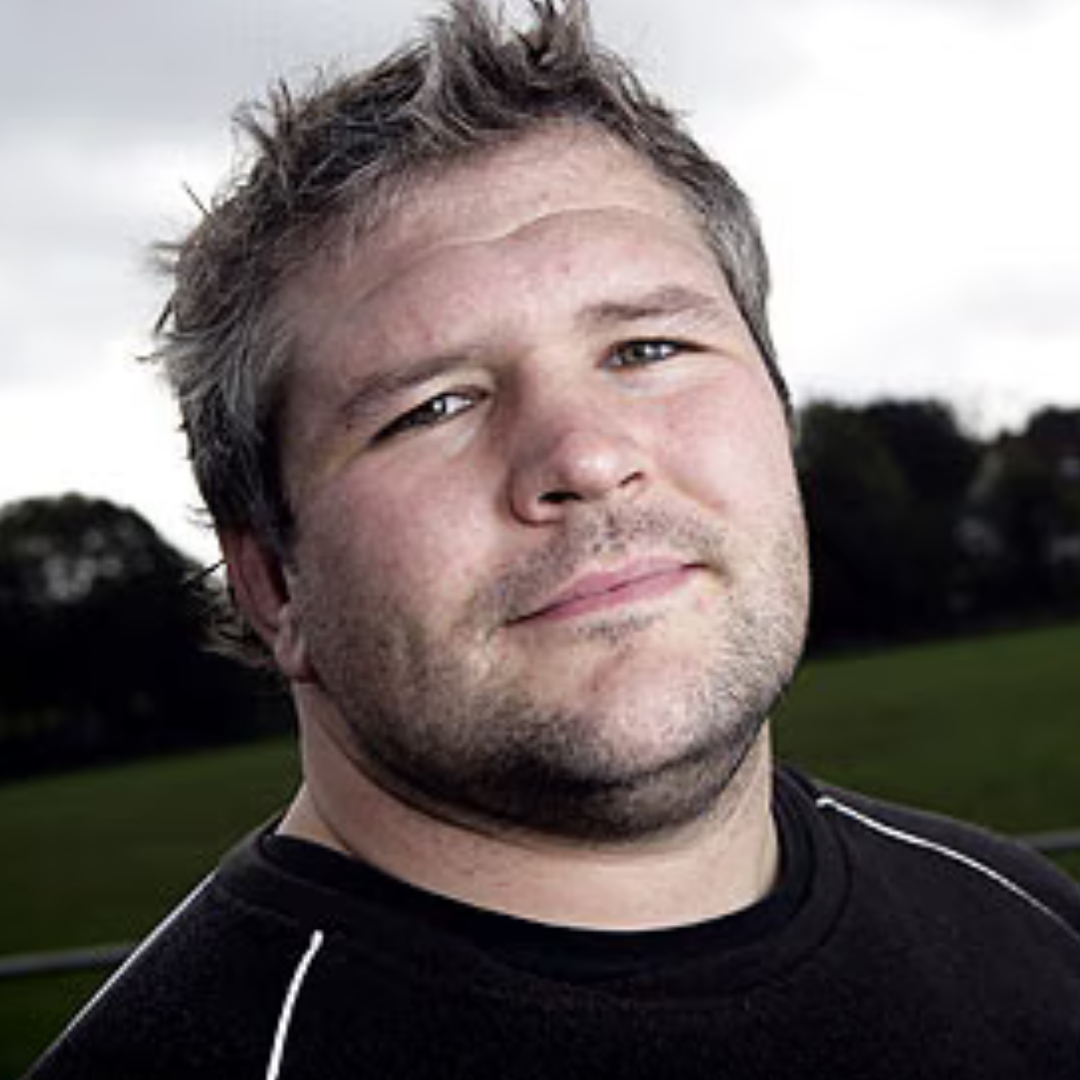
Rugby Kit photoshoot.

In 2002 he was appointed club captain, succeeding Scott Gibbs. His ability to cover both prop positions made him particularly valuable during European competitions, where squad depth was often tested.

=== Leicester Tigers (2003–2006) ===
Morris signed for Leicester Tigers in 2003, joining a front row that included England internationals Graham Rowntree, Julian White and 2003 Rugby World Cup winning captain Martin Johnson. Over three seasons he made more than 70 appearances in the Premiership and Heineken Cup.

He featured in several Premiership play-off campaigns, including the semi-final win over London Wasps in 2005 and the Premiership finals of 2005 and 2006. His capacity to play on either side of the scrum gave Leicester crucial flexibility during a highly competitive period for the club.

=== Worcester Warriors (2006–2009) ===
In 2006 Morris joined Worcester Warriors, where he made 64 appearances over three seasons. He was a cornerstone of the Worcester pack as the club battled to secure its Premiership status.

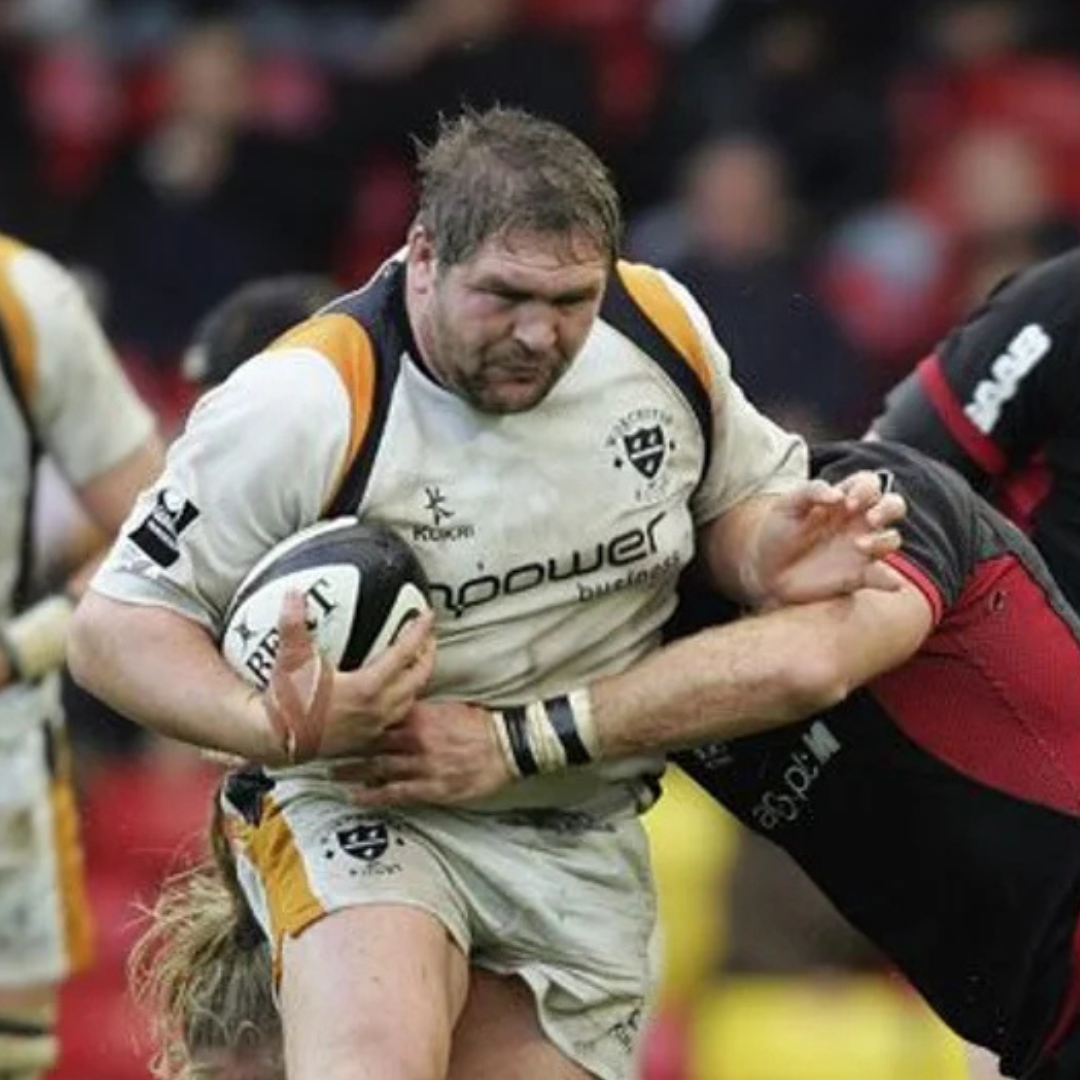
Darren Morris in action for Worcester Warriors.

At Worcester, he also began to take on an informal mentoring role, helping to develop younger props. His scrummaging knowledge and experience across both prop positions made him one of the most reliable senior figures in the squad.

=== Cardiff Blues and Northampton Saints (2009–2010) ===
Morris returned to Wales in 2009 for a short stint with Cardiff Blues, before moving in January 2010 to the Northampton Saints on a short-term deal. Head coach Jim Mallinder noted at the time that Morris brought “considerable experience of Premiership, European and international rugby” and highlighted his rare ability to play both loosehead and tighthead.

His signing provided crucial cover during the latter stages of the season, and his technical expertise in the scrum was valued within the squad.

=== RGC 1404, Ampthill and Hartpury College (2010–2012) ===
After leaving Northampton, Morris combined playing and coaching roles. He joined RGC 1404 in North Wales as a forwards coach while also being involved with Ampthill RUFC. In 2011 he moved to Hartpury College as a player-coach, contributing to the development of young players while making occasional on-field appearances.

Morris announced his retirement from playing at the end of the 2011–12 season, closing his professional playing career after nearly two decades at senior level.

=== Doncaster Knights (2013–2014) ===
In late 2013 Morris briefly came out of retirement to join Doncaster Knights as a player-coach. He made appearances in the National League One campaign and helped the Knights secure promotion back to the RFU Championship in 2014. Local reports credited his Lions pedigree and scrummaging experience as key contributions to the club’s successful season.

== International career ==
Morris represented Wales at all age grades, beginning with the Wales Under-15s at the age of 15. He went on to captain the Wales Schools Under-18s side, a team noted for producing future internationals, before progressing to Wales Under-19s and Wales Under-21s.

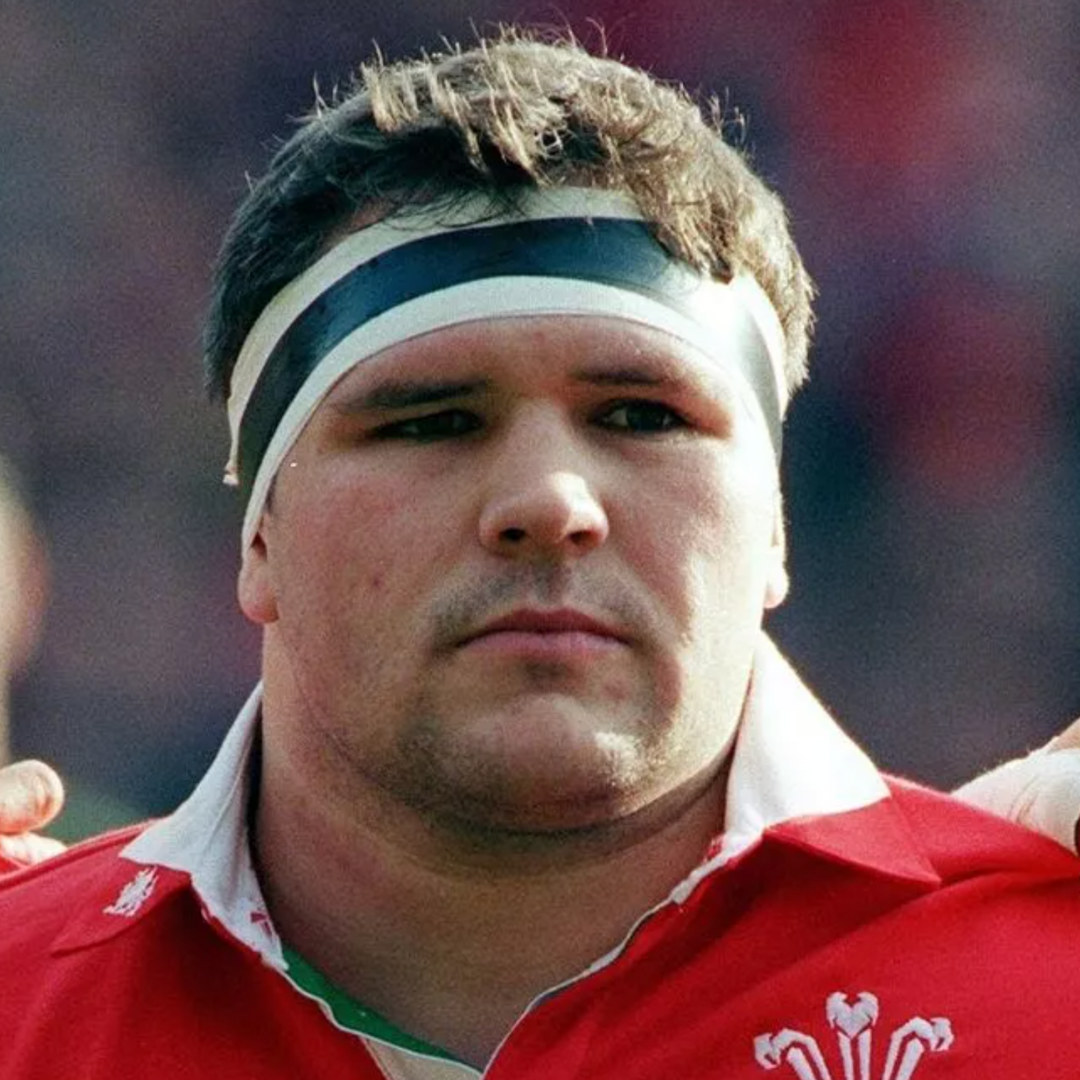
Darren Morris playing for Wales.

He received his first senior call-up in 1996 but was unable to win a cap at that time due to injury. Morris made his Test debut for Wales on 6 June 1998 against Zimbabwe in Harare. Over the next six years he earned 18 caps, scoring one try (5 points). His only Test try came against Japan during the 2001 summer tour.

Morris played in the 2001 Six Nations Championship and that year was selected for the 2001 British & Irish Lions tour to Australia. He featured in six tour matches, including starts against the New South Wales Waratahs and ACT Brumbies, and appeared as a replacement in the third Test in Sydney. His Test appearance placed him among the select group of Welsh front-rowers to have played for the Lions in the professional era.

He continued to represent Wales during the early 2000s, including the 2004 summer tour to Argentina and South Africa. Morris’s final appearances for Wales came later that year, bringing his international tally to 18 caps.

In 2005 he was again involved with the British & Irish Lions, named as part of the wider training and standby squad ahead of the tour to New Zealand.
