= Dallas RFC =

Dallas Rugby
- Full name: Dallas Rugby Football Club
- Nickname: The Reds
- Founded: 1968
- Ground: Lake Highlands Park
- President: Jeff Robertson
- Coach: Filip Keuppens
- League(s): USA Men's Rugby Division I, Div. II, Div. III, Div. IV; USA Women's Rugby Division II

Dallas Rugby Football Club is an American rugby team based in Dallas. The flagship team plays in the Red River Conference of the USA Rugby Division I, with additional teams playing in USA Rugby Division II and USA Rugby Division III.

== History ==
The club was founded in 1968. In 1978 they became the first Texas club to tour overseas when they toured England and Wales. Dallas RFC was also the first Texas rugby club to tour Australia in 1988. The side played matches in Sydney, Brisbane and the Sunshine Coast.

== Notable former coaches ==
- (Wales) Darren Morris
