= Rod Moore (rugby union) =

Australian rugby union player (born 1972)

Rodney Charles Moore (born 6 January 1972) is an Australian former rugby union player who played tighthead prop for the ACT Brumbies, New South Wales Waratahs, North Harbour, Ulster, and the Australia national team.

Born in Sydney, he was educated at Carlingford High School, and represented Australia at schoolboy level. He played club rugby for Eastwood, and signed professionally for the Brumbies in 1997. He moved to the Waratahs in 1999. His first cap for Australia came in the 1999 Rugby World Cup, which Australia won. In 2000 he spent a year with North Harbour in New Zealand's National Provincial Championship. Returning to the Waratahs, he was recalled for Australia and played in their series win against the British and Irish Lions and Tri Nations Championship in 2001. He won 14 caps for Australia, his last coming in 2002.

He missed out on selection for the 2003 Rugby World Cup, and signed for Ulster, initially as short-term injury cover. He later signed long-term, and ended up spending three seasons with the Irish province, winning the 2003 Celtic Cup and the 2006 Celtic League. He moved to Italian club Calvisano in 2006, and in 2007 he returned to Australia to play for the Central Coast Rays in the Australian Rugby Championship. He coached for a while, before leaving rugby to work in banking. As of 2022 he was a senior manager with Mizuho Bank.
