= Nick Stiles =

Australia international rugby union player & coach

- Born: Nicholas Bryan Stiles; 17 October 1973 (age 53) Melbourne, Australia
- Height: 1.70 m (5 ft 7 in)
- Weight: 120 kg (18 st 13 lb)
- School: Gregory Terrace

Rugby union career
- Position: Loosehead prop
Senior career
| Years | Team | Apps | (Points) |
| 1993–96 | Souths | | |
| 1997–2005 | University | | |
Provincial / State sides
| Years | Team | Apps | (Points) |
| 1993–2005 | Queensland Reds | 93 | (25) |
Super Rugby
| Years | Team | Apps | (Points) |
| 1999–2005 | Queensland Reds | 68 | (25) |
- Correct as of 22 June 2005
International career
| Years | Team | Apps | (Points) |
| 2001–02 | Australia | 12 | (51t) |
| 1992 | Australian Schoolboys | | |
Coaching career
- Years: Team
- 2005–2007: University of Queensland
- 2007–2010: Kubota Spears (forwards coach)
- 2010–2013: RugbyWA (forwards coach)
- 2013–2015: Reds (forwards coach)
- 2014–2015: Brisbane City
- 2015–2016: Reds (assistant coach)
- 2016–2017: Reds
- 2018–2021: Kintetsu Liners
- 2022–: Rebels (General Manager of Rugby)

Nick Stiles (born 17 October 1973) is an Australian professional rugby union coach and a former player for the Queensland Reds. He also played in twelve Tests for Australia as a loosehead prop.

== Family and early life ==
Stiles was born in Melbourne, but grew up in Brisbane. He was educated at Gregory Terrace, where he rowed in the first VIII and played rugby for the first XV. Stiles was selected for the Australian Schoolboys side in 1992 and named as captain.

In 1993 and 1994, Stiles played in the Queensland Under 21s side and was a fringe player in the Queensland Reds squad. During this time, Stiles played for Souths in the Brisbane club competition. Because of the physical development and technical ability needed to play front row at representative level, his progression to the senior Queensland side took several years. In 1997, he switched clubs to join University where he was made the club captain – a role he held until 2005 when he retired from playing. He captained the Australian Universities team in 1997 and 1998.

== Rugby career ==
=== Queensland ===
After having been a squad member for nearly five years, Stiles made his senior Queensland starting debut in 1998. He made his Super 12 starting debut for the Reds at Cape Town in 1999, in a match with the Stormers. The Reds managed to finish on top of the table that year for the regular season but squandered their semi-final home advantage and were defeated by the Crusaders who went on to win the 1999 title.

Stiles became the first choice at loosehead prop for the Reds in 2001, and remained so for the next five seasons. An injury to Queensland's captain Elton Flatley in 2004 allowed him to assume the captain's role at the Reds.

In the last season of his Reds contract in 2005, the 31-year-old Stiles was still playing strongly enough to be the starting loosehead. However, he wasn't offered a new contract and played his final Queensland game against New Zealand A in June 2005, finishing with 93 state caps.

=== Australia ===
Stiles was selected in the Wallaby squad for the European tour in 2000. While he did not play any matches, he gained crucial experience training with the team ahead of the 2001 season. The Australians as reigning Rugby World Cup champions would be seriously challenged and Stiles would play a crucial role for the Wallabies in defending their status.

In 2001, he was selected in the Australian squad to face the touring British and Irish Lions side. It was the first such visit from the Lions for twelve years. Stiles made his Australian debut in the lead-up to the series, playing in the match against New Zealand Maori. He scored a try in the 41–29 win over the visiting including a number of All Black players. The ARU did not award test caps for the encounter, though, unlike past matches with the Maori.

A good performance against the Maori led to his selection for first Lions test at Brisbane. The Australian team lost in a stunning defeat to the British side but the selection panel persevered with the players and Stiles kept his place for the Melbourne test. After a poor start, the Wallabies finished the stronger in the second test to secure a 35–14 win. They then went on to claim the Tom Richards Trophy the next week in the decider at Sydney.

In the following month, the Wallabies retained both the Bledisloe Cup and Tri-Nations trophy. The Australians were the dominant force in world rugby. From 2001 to 2002, Stiles was an integral part of the team. Although in good form during the Super 12, he lost his place in the Wallabies squad in 2003 as the Reds finished with a losing record for the season.

== Coaching ==
In his playing years, Stiles had taken several off-field roles, including Coaching Director of the Queensland Rugby Union in 1995 and 1996, and coaching several first XV school teams.

After retiring from playing, he was the head coach of Premier Grade at University of Queensland from 2005 to 2007. He then moved to Japan as the forwards coach of the Kubota Spears for three seasons, before returning to Australia to take up the forwards coaching position at the Western Force. Stiles was at the Force from 2010 to 2013, before linking again with the Queensland Reds as the forwards coach for 2014 season. He was appointed as head coach of Brisbane City for the inaugural season of Australia's National Rugby Championship, winning the competition twice in his first two seasons in 2014 and 2015.

Stiles was appointed as co-interim head coach of the Reds alongside Matt O'Connor two games into the 2016 season, after Richard Graham was sacked as head coach. On 26 July 2016, he was named the new head coach of the franchise.
