= RK Ąžuolas =

Ąžuolas
- Full name: Kauno regbio klubas Ąžuolas
- Founded: 1989
- Location: Kaunas, Lithuania
- President: Vytautas Vasilenko
- Coach(es): Giedrius Narakas
Team kit

Regbio klubas Ąžuolas (English: Rugby Club Ąžuolas) are an amateur rugby club based in Kaunas, Lithuania, founded in 1989.

In 2015 it became the rugby section for the primarily basketball club Žalgiris Kaunas, adapting the name Regbio klubas Žalgiris (English: Rugby Club Žalgiris). The partnership fell apart in 2019, and the rugby club was renamed back to RK Ąžuolas.
