= Ben Darwin =

Australia international rugby union player

- Born: 17 October 1976 (age 50)
- Height: 188 cm (6 ft 2 in)
- Weight: 115 kg (18 st 2 lb)

Rugby union career
International career
Years	Team	Apps	(Points)
2001-2003	Australia		
Coaching career
- Years: Team
- –: Northern Suburbs
- –: Western Force
- –: NTT Shining Arcs
- –: Melbourne Rebels

Ben Darwin (born 17 October 1976) is an Australian former rugby union player and coach. He played 28 times for the Wallabies, Australia's national team, from 2001 to 2003. During this time, Darwin played games against the British and Irish Lions and was part of the Wallabies' 2003 Rugby World Cup team. His usual position was tighthead prop, although on occasion he played on the loosehead side.

== Playing career ==
Darwin made his international debut for Australia in June 2001, coming off the bench against the touring Lions in Brisbane. He also played in the 2001 Tri Nations Series later that year, and was capped against Spain, England, France and Wales. He played in the 2002 Tri Nations Series, as well as being capped another four times during the end of year tour. He played 11 times for Australia in 2003, and was included in the 2003 World Cup squad. It was during the Wallabies' World Cup semi-final win against the All Blacks that Darwin sustained a neck injury that forced him to retire from rugby.

== Coaching career ==
After retirement, Darwin made the switch from player to coach, starting at club rugby level with Sydney's Northern Suburbs where he was appointed head coach in 2005. In 2006, Darwin was involved with the start up of the Super 14 club, the Western Force, as the Forwards Coach until mid-2006. In 2007, Darwin was selected to be a part of the commentary team covering the 2007 Rugby World Cup in France for the Australian television network, Channel 10. While he France, Darwin was also in training for his first Iron Man triathlon, which he completed in Port Macquarie in April 2008. He finished his second Iron Man, again at Port Macquarie, the following year.

At the beginning of June 2008, Darwin moved to Tokyo where he served as the Forwards Coach for the Japanese Top League Rugby team, the NTT Shining Arcs, a team owned by Japanese telecommunications giant NTT. Darwin was integral to the club's promotion from the 2nd Division Top East competition to Top League at the end of the 09/10 season. In 2010, Darwin returned to Melbourne,Australia in order to take up the Scrum Coach/Video Analyst position for the Melbourne Rebels Super Rugby franchise team.

Darwin writes regular columns on rugby matters for www.rugbyzone.com. Darwin began Gain Line Analytics in 2013 and works with leading sporting clubs, national teams and corporate clients.

== Career Timeline ==
2005: Head Coach at Northern Suburbs, Sydney Australia

2006: Forwards Coach at Western Force, Perth, Australia

2008–10: Forwards Coach and Video Analyst at NTT Shining Arcs, Tokyo, Japan.

2010–12: Scrum Coach and Video Analyst/Head of IT at Melbourne Rebels, Melbourne, Australia.

2012–13: Forwards Coach for Suntory Sungoliath, Tokyo, Japan.

2013-:Co Founded Gain Line Analytics with Simon Strachan former senior interior designer with Holden Australia.
