= Elton Flatley =

Australia international rugby union player

- Born: Elton Flatley; 7 May 1977 (age 49) Tamworth, New South Wales, Australia
- Height: 178 cm (5 ft 10 in)
- Weight: 87 kg (13 st 10 lb)
- School: St. Joseph's Nudgee College

Rugby union career
- Position(s): Fly-half; inside centre
- Current team: Retired
Senior career
Years	Team	Apps	(Points)
1996–2006	Queensland Reds	114	(609)
International career
Years	Team	Apps	(Points)
1997–2005	Australia	38	(187)

Elton Flatley (born 7 May 1977, Tamworth, New South Wales) is an Australian former international rugby union footballer. He played for the Queensland Reds.

== Career ==
Flatley was educated at St. Joseph's Nudgee College where he was signed into the professional ranks of rugby union upon graduating. He made his debut for the Queensland Reds in 1996, the inaugural season of the Super 12, at the very young age of 18 against New Zealand side, Highlanders. In 1997, he made his international debut for Australia, playing against England at Twickenham on 15 November, aged 20. The game was a 15–15 draw. Flatley was again in the team for the next game against Scotland, which Australia won. In 2001, he was a member of the Wallabies team that won the test series against the British & Irish Lions during the 2001 tour to Australia.

Flatley figured prominently in Australia's 2003 Rugby World Cup campaign, going right to the final against England and scoring the penalty that took the match to extra time, then another penalty which evened the scores at 17–17 before England ultimately prevailed. He finished the tournament as the third highest point score, scoring 100 points for Australia. In April 2004, Flatley reached another milestone, becoming the youngest player ever to reach 100 caps for the Queensland Reds when he led the side out against the Sharks in Durban. Flatley prematurely retired from all forms of rugby on 16 March 2006, on medical advice as he was suffering from continued blurred vision due to a number of concussions.

== Personal life ==
Flatley has two children with his wife, whom he separated from in 2007. In 2006 he was a contestant on Australian Celebrity Survivor: Vanuatu.

== Post-retirement ==
Flatley works as a promotional speaker, and works in the finance industry. He also worked for a period for the Australian Rugby Union (now known as Rugby Australia) as a consultant.
