= Harry Viljoen =

South African rugby union coach

Harry Viljoen is a South African former rugby coach and player. He coached the provincial teams of the Transvaal, Natal, and Western Province, before being appointed as coach of the South African national side. He retired as Springboks coach after a disappointing season in 2001 with five wins from eleven test matches.

Earlier in life, he played at scrum half for Transvaal.

== Business career ==
In 1988 Viljoen founded The Harry Viljoen Group, an insurance brokerage. This business subsequent moved into the field of investment consulting. In 1999 he founded another capital management company, Edge Investments.

Sporting positions
Preceded by (South Africa) Nick Mallet	South Africa National Rugby Union Coach; 2000–2002	Succeeded by (South Africa) Rudolf Straeuli
