= 1996 Australia rugby union tour of Europe =

- Manager: P R A Falk
- Tour captain: J A Eales
Summary
P	W	D	L
Total
12	12	0	0
Test match
4	4	0	0
Opponent
P	W	D	L
Italy
1	1	0	0
Scotland
1	1	0	0
Ireland
1	1	0	0
Wales
1	1	0	0

The 1996 Australia rugby union tour was a series of rugby union matches played between 19 October and 7 December 1996 in Europe by the Australia national rugby union team.

== Results ==
Scores and results list Australia's points tally first.

Opposing Team	For	Against	Date	Venue	Status
Italy A	55	19	19 October 1996	St. Maria Goretti, Catania	Tour match
Italy	40	18	23 October 1996	Stadio Plebiscito, Padua	Test Match
Scotland A	47	20	30 October 1996	Netherdale, Galashiels	Tour match
Glasgow-Edinburgh	37	19	3 November 1996	Old Anniesland, Glasgow	Tour match
Combined Scottish Districts	25	9	5 November 1996	McDiarmid Park, Perth	Tour match
Scotland	29	19	9 November 1996	Murrayfield, Edinburgh	Test Match
Connacht	37	20	13 November 1996	The Sports Grounds, Galway	Tour match
Ulster	39	26	16 November 1996	Ravenhill, Belfast	Tour match
Ireland	22	12	23 November 1996	Lansdowne Road, Dublin	Test Match
Munster	55	19	26 November 1996	Thomond Park, Limerick	Tour match
Wales	28	19	1 December 1996	Cardiff Arms Park, Cardiff	Test Match
Barbarians	39	12	7 December 1996	Twickenham, London	Tour match

=== In Italy ===
19 October 1996

Italy A	19–55	Australia XV

St. Maria Goretti, Catania

23 October 1996

Italy	18–40	Australia
Try: Stefano Bordon, Diego Dominguez; Con: Diego Dominguez; Pen: Diego Dominguez; Drop: Diego Dominguez		Try: Tim Horan, Daniel Manu; David Wilson; Con: Matt Burke 4 Pen: Matt Burke 4

Stadio Plebiscito, Padua
Referee: Don Reordan (USA)

Italy: 15. Javier Pertile, 14. Massimo Ravazzolo, 13. Ivan Francescato, 12. Stefano Bordon, 11. Leandro Manteri, 10. Diego Dominguez, 9. Alessandro Troncon, 8. Orazio Arancio, 7. Andrea Sgorlon, 6. Massimo Giovanelli (capt.), 5. Diego Scaglia, 4. Walter Cristofoletto, 3. Franco Properzi-Curti, 2. Carlo Orlandi, 1. Mauro dal Sie, replacements:, Andrea Barattin
Australia : 15. Matt Burke, 14. Tim Horan, 13. Dan Herbert, 12. Pat Howard, 11. David Campese, 10. David Knox, 9. George Gregan, 8. Mike Brial, 7. David Wilson, 6. Daniel Manu, 5. John Eales (capt.), 4. John Welborn, 3. Andrew Heath, 2. Michael Foley, 1. Richard Harry, replacements:, Brett Robinson, Jason Little

- David Campese won his 100th cap for Australia.

=== In Scotland ===
30 October 1996

Scotland A	20–47	Australia XV
Try: Smith; Pen: Hodge 4 Drop: Hodge		Try: Horan 2, Burke, Connors, Payne; Con: Burke 5 Pen: Burke 4

Netherdale, Galashiels
Referee: J. Pearson

3 November 1996

Glasgow–Edinburgh	19–37	Australia XV
Try: Logan; Con: Donaldson; Pen: Donaldson 4		Try: Connors, Manu, Wilson, Knox, Campese; Con: Knox 3 Pen: Knox 2

Old Anniesland, Glasgow
Referee: A. Watson (Ireland)

5 November 1996

Combined Scottish Districts	9–14	Australia XV
Pen: Parker 3		Try: Williams, Magro, Roff; Con: Wallace 2 Pen: Wallace 2

McDiarmid Park, Perth
Referee: T Rowlands (Wales)

9 November 1996

Scotland	19–29	Australia
Try: Kenny Logan, Tony Stanger; Pen: Rowen Shepherd 3		Try: Dan Herbert, Warwick Waugh; Con: Matt Burke 2 Pen: Matt Burke 5

Murrayfield, Edinburgh
Referee: Patrick Thomas (France)

Scotland: 15. Rowen Shepherd, 14. Tony Stanger, 13. Gregor Townsend (capt.), 12. Ronnie Eriksson, 11. Kenny Logan, 10. Craig Chalmers, 9. Gary Armstrong, 8. Eric Peters, 7. Ian Smith, 6. Murray Wallace, 5. Doddie Weir, 4. Damian Cronin, 3. Barry Stewart, 2. Kevin McKenzie, 1. Dave Hilton, replacements:, Bryan Redpath, Unused:, Derek Stark, Scott Hastings, Scott Murray, Alan Watt

Australia: 15. Matt Burke, 14. Tim Horan, 13. Dan Herbert, 12. Pat Howard, 11. Joe Roff, 10. David Knox, 9. Sam Payne, 8. Daniel Manu, 7. David Wilson, 6. Owen Finegan, 5. Warwick Waugh, 4. John Eales (capt.), 3. Andrew Blades, 2. Michael Foley, 1. Richard Harry, replacements:, Brett Robinson Unused:, Marco Caputo, Andrew Heath, George Gregan, Richard Tombs, David Campese

=== In Ireland ===
13 November 1996

Connacht	20–37	Australia XV
Try: Leahy; Pen: Elwood		Try: Cregan 2, Finegan; Gavin, Murdoch; Con: T Wallace 3 Pen: T. Wallace 2

The Sports Ground, Galway

16 November 1996

Ulster	26–39	Australia XV

Ravenhill, Belfast

23 November 1996

Ireland	12–22	Australia
Pen: Paul Burke (4)		Try: David Knox; Con: Matt Burke; Pen: Matt Burke (5)

Lansdowne Road, Dublin
Attendance: 52,000
Referee: Brian Campsall (England)

Ireland: 15. Jim Staples, 14. James Topping, 13. Jonny Bell, 12. Mark McCall, 11. Dominic Crotty, 10. Paul Burke, 9. Stephen McIvor, 8. Anthony Foley, 7. Denis McBride, 6. David Corkery, 5. Jeremy Davidson, 4. Gabriel Fulcher, 3. Paul Wallace, 2. Keith Wood (cap.), 1. Nick Popplewell, substitutes , Maurice Field
Australia: 15. Matt Burke, 14. Jason Little, 13. Dan Herbert, 12. Tim Horan, 11. Joe Roff, 10. David Knox, 9. George Gregan, 8. Mike Brial, 7. David Wilson, 6. Daniel Manu, 5. John Eales (cap.), 4. Warwick Waugh, 3. Andrew Blades, 2. Michael Foley, 1. Dan Crowley, substitutes:, Brett Robinson

26 November 1996

Munster	19–55	Australia XV
Try: Keane; Con: Keane; Pen: Keane 3 Drop: Murray		Try: Campese 2, Murdoch 2 Finegan, Kefu, Little; Payne, Tune; Con: Larkham 5

Thomond Park, Limerick

=== In Wales ===
1 December 1996

Wales	19–28	Australia
Try: Gareth Thomas; Con: Jonathan Davies; Pen: Jonathan Davies 4		Try: Mike Brial, Matt Burke; 1 penalty try Con: Matt Burke 2 Pen: Matt Burke 3

Cardiff Arms Park, Cardiff
Referee: Iain Ramage (Scotland)

Wales: 15. Wayne Proctor, 14. Ieuan Evans, 13. Scott Gibbs, 12. Gareth Thomas, 11. Dafydd James, 10. Jonathan Davies, 9. Rob Howley, 8. Steve Williams, 7. Kingsley Jones, 6. Hemi Taylor, 5. Derwyn Jones, 4. Gareth Llewellyn, 3. Dai Young, 2. Jonathan Humphreys (cap.), 1. Christian Loader, sostituti:, Colin Charvis, Neil Jenkins, Craig Quinnell
Australia : 15. Matt Burke, 14. Joe Roff, 13. Jason Little, 12. Tim Horan(cap.), 11. David Campese, 10. Pat Howard, 9. George Gregan, 8. Mike Brial, 7. David Wilson, 6. Owen Finegan, 5. David Giffin, 4. Tim Gavin, 3. Andrew Blades, 2. Michael Foley, 1. Dan Crowley

=== The match against Barbarians ===
7 December 1996

Barbarians	12–39	Australia XV
Try: Bateman, S Quinnell; Con: Andrew		Try: Burke 2, Roff; Campese, Horan; Con: Burke 4 Pen: Burke 2

Twickenham
Referee: Ed Morrison (England)

Barbarians: 15. T Stimpson (England) , (Joel Stransky 22' (South Africa) ), 14 N Walker (Wales) , 13 A Bateman (Wales) , 12 Gregor Townsend (Scotland) , (M Allen 73' (England) ), 11 T Underwood (England) , 10 Rob Andrew (capt) (England) , 9 R Howley (Wales) , (A Moore 59' (Wales) ), 8 S Quinnell (Wales) , (D. Weir 79' (Scotland) ), 7 Neil Back (England) , 6 D McIntosh (Wales) , 5 I Jones (New Zealand) , 4 C Quinnell (Wales) , 3 D.Garforth (England) , 2 N. Hewitt (New Zealand) , 1 N Popplewell (Republic of Ireland)
Australia: 15. Matt Burke, (Stephen Larkham, 79'), 14. Joe Roff, 13.D Herbert, 12 T Horan (capt), 11. David Campese, 10.P Howard, (R Tombs, 73'), 9. S Payne, 8.M Brial, (B Robinson 23'), 7. D Wilson, 6.O Finnegan, 5. T Gavin, 4. D Giffin, 3. A Blades, (A Heath, 77), 2. M Caputo, (M Foley, 25) 1. D.Crowley,

== See also ==
- History of rugby union matches between Australia and the Barbarians
- History of rugby union matches between Australia and Ireland
- History of rugby union matches between Australia and Italy
- History of rugby union matches between Australia and Scotland
- History of rugby union matches between Australia and Wales
