= Llanelli RFC 13–9 Australia =

Rugby union match in November 1992

Llanelli 13–9 Australia
| Llanelli | Australia |
| (Wales) | (Australia) |
| 13 | 9 |
- Date: 14 November 1992
- Venue: Stradey Park, Llanelli
- Referee: Fred Howard (England)

As part of their 1992 tour of Europe, the Australia national rugby union team played 13 matches in Ireland and Wales. The ninth match was played against Welsh club side Llanelli RFC on 14 November 1992 at Stradey Park, Llanelli. The hosts won the match 13–9 thanks to a first-half try from wing Ieuan Evans, converted by Colin Stephens, who added two drop goals in the second half. All of Australia's points came from penalties kicked by Marty Roebuck.

== Background ==
In October and November 1992, the Australia national rugby union team played a series of 13 matches in Ireland and Great Britain. They came into the tour as world champions, having won the 1991 Rugby World Cup twelve months earlier. They played test matches against Ireland and Wales, with tour matches against smaller teams from each country leading up to each test. On the Wales leg of the tour, they lost to Swansea in their opening match before beating Wales B and Neath ahead of their clash with Llanelli. Meanwhile, the Scarlets had won eight of their first nine games in WRU Division One, losing at home to rivals Swansea on 26 September.

== Match details ==
14 November 1992
14:30

| Llanelli | 13–9 | Australia |
| Try: I. Evans c Con: Stephens; Drop: Stephens (2) | Report | Pen: Roebuck (3) |

Stradey Park, Llanelli
Attendance: 14,000
Referee: Fred Howard (England)

| FB | 15 | Huw Williams |
| RW | 14 | Ieuan Evans |
| OC | 13 | Nigel Davies |
| IC | 12 | Simon Davies |
| LW | 11 | Wayne Proctor |
| FH | 10 | Colin Stephens |
| SH | 9 | Rupert Moon (c) |
| N8 | 8 | Emyr Lewis |
| OF | 7 | Lyn Jones |
| BF | 6 | Mark Perego |
| RL | 5 | Tony Copsey |
| LL | 4 | Phil Davies |
| TP | 3 | Laurance Delaney | (substituted off) 42' |
| HK | 2 | Andrew Lamerton |
| LP | 1 | Ricky Evans |
Replacements:
| FL | 16 | Gary Jones |
| LK | 17 | Paul Jones |
| PR | 18 | Dai Joseph | (substituted on) 42' |
| SH | 19 | Steve Wake |
| CE | 20 | Neil Boobyer |
| HK | 21 | Barry Williams |
Coach:
(Wales) Gareth Jenkins

| FB | 15 | Marty Roebuck |
| RW | 14 | Damian Smith |
| OC | 13 | Tim Kelaher |
| IC | 12 | Jason Little |
| LW | 11 | Darren Junee |
| FH | 10 | Tim Horan |
| SH | 9 | Peter Slattery |
| N8 | 8 | Tim Gavin |
| OF | 7 | David Wilson |
| BF | 6 | Viliami Ofahengaue |
| RL | 5 | John Eales | (substituted off) 10' |
| LL | 4 | Rod McCall |
| TP | 3 | Ewen McKenzie |
| HK | 2 | Phil Kearns (c) |
| LP | 1 | Dan Crowley |
Replacements:
| SH | 16 | Anthony Ekert |
| FH | 17 | Paul Kahl |
| HK | 19 | David Nucifora |
| PR | 20 | Andrew Blades |
| LK | 21 | Troy Coker | (substituted on) 10' |
Coach:
(Australia) Bob Dwyer
