= 2005–06 European Challenge Cup pool stage =

- Season: 2005–06 European Challenge Cup
- Date: 22 October 2005 – 22 January 2006

Qualifiers
- Seed 1: (England) Gloucester
- Seed 2: (England) Newcastle Falcons
- Seed 3: (England) London Irish
- Seed 4: (England) Northampton Saints
- Seed 5: (England) Worcester Warriors
- Seed 6: (France) Bayonne
- Seed 7: (Ireland) Connacht
- Seed 8: (France) Brive

The 2005–06 European Challenge Cup pool stage was the opening stage of the tenth season of the European Challenge Cup, the second-tier competition for European rugby union clubs. It began with all twenty teams playing on 22 October 2005 and ended when Bristol hosted Narbonne on 22 January 2006.

Twenty teams participated in this phase of the competition; they were divided into five pools of four teams each, with each team playing the others home and away. Competition points were earned using the standard bonus point system. The five pool winners and the best three runners-up advanced to the knockout stage. These teams then competed in a single-elimination tournament that ended with the final at the Twickenham Stoop in London on 21 May 2006.

== Results ==
All times are local to the game location.

Key to colours
Winner of each pool, advance to quarterfinals. Seed # in parentheses
Three highest-scoring second-place teams advance to quarterfinals. Seed # in parentheses

=== Pool 1 ===
Team	P	W	D	L	Tries for	Tries against	Try diff	Points for	Points against	Points diff	TB	LB	Pts
(England) Northampton Saints (4)	6	5	0	1	32	12	20	194	96	98	5	0	25
(France) Narbonne	6	4	0	2	16	11	5	125	113	12	2	0	18
(England) Bristol	6	3	0	3	26	21	5	203	150	53	3	1	16
(Italy) Viadana	6	0	0	6	9	39	−30	81	244	−163	0	1	1

22 October 2005
15:00

Northampton Saints (England)	47–25	(Italy) Viadana

Franklin's Gardens
Attendance: 10,802

22 October 2005
18:30

Narbonne (France)	20–13	(England) Bristol

Parc des Sports Et de l'Amitié
Attendance: 5,250

28 October 2005
19:30

Viadana (Italy)	14–20	(France) Narbonne

Stadio Luigi Zaffanella
Attendance: 500

30 October 2005
15:00

Bristol (England)	36–28	(England) Northampton Saints

Memorial Stadium
Attendance: 5,662

9 December 2005
19:30

Viadana (Italy)	23–39	(England) Bristol

Stadio Luigi Zaffanella
Attendance: 600

10 December 2005
15:00

Northampton Saints (England)	32–20	(France) Narbonne

Franklin's Gardens
Attendance: 11,572

16 December 2005
19:30

Narbonne (France)	7–22	(England) Northampton Saints

Parc des Sports Et de l'Amitié
Attendance: 3,500

18 December 2005
15:00

Bristol (England)	89–5	(Italy) Viadana

Memorial Stadium
Attendance: 4,426

14 January 2006
15:00

Northampton Saints (England)	45–8	(England) Bristol

Franklin's Gardens
Attendance: 12,227

14 January 2006
18:30

Narbonne (France)	29–14	(Italy) Viadana

Parc des Sports Et de l'Amitié
Attendance: 2,500

21 January 2006
19:30

Viadana (Italy)	0–20	(England) Northampton Saints

Stadio Luigi Zaffanella
Attendance: 0

22 January 2006
15:00

Bristol (England)	18–29	(France) Narbonne

Memorial Stadium
Attendance: 4,762

=== Pool 2 ===
Team	P	W	D	L	Tries for	Tries against	Try diff	Points for	Points against	Points diff	TB	LB	Pts
(England) London Irish (3)	6	6	0	0	32	11	21	239	81	158	3	0	27
(France) Agen	6	3	0	3	23	15	8	163	143	20	3	0	14
(France) Pau	6	2	0	4	12	19	−7	107	153	−46	2	1	11
(Italy) Overmach Parma	6	1	0	5	8	30	−22	74	206	−132	0	0	4

22 October 2005
15:00

Overmach Parma (Italy)	23–50	(France) Agen

Sergio Lanfranchi
Attendance: 490

22 October 2005
18:30

Pau (France)	13–20	(England) London Irishÿ

Stade du Hameau
Attendance: 5,800

29 October 2005
18:30

Agen (France)	23–6	(France) Pau

Stade Armandie
Attendance: 8,000

30 October 2005
15:00

London Irish (England)	64–0	(Italy) Overmach Parma

Madejski Stadium
Attendance: 5,760

10 December 2005
18:30

Pau (France)	29–3	(Italy) Overmach Parma

Stade du Hameau
Attendance: 2,000

11 December 2005
15:00

London Irish (England)	29–21	(France) Agen

Madejski Stadium
Attendance: 4,452

17 December 2005
14:30

Overmach Parma (Italy)	20–11	(France) Pau

Sergio Lanfranchi
Attendance: 200

17 December 2005
18:30

Agen (France)	24–32	(England) London Irish

Stade Armandie
Attendance: 12,000

14 January 2006
14:30

Overmach Parma (Italy)	11–19	(England) London Irish

Sergio Lanfranchi
Attendance: 1,000

14 January 2006
18:30

Pau (France)	36–12	(France) Agen

Stade du Hameau
Attendance: 4,000

21 January 2006
14:00

London Irish (England)	75–12	(France) Pau

Madejski Stadium
Attendance: 4,647

21 January 2006
15:00

Agen (France)	33–17	(Italy) Overmach Parma

Stade Armandie
Attendance: 5,000

=== Pool 3 ===
Team	P	W	D	L	Tries for	Tries against	Try diff	Points for	Points against	Points diff	TB	LB	Pts
(England) Gloucester (1)	6	6	0	0	49	6	43	331	53	278	5	0	29
(France) Bayonne (6)	6	4	0	2	31	11	20	202	93	109	4	0	20
(Romania) București	6	1	0	5	7	40	−33	71	253	−182	0	1	5
(France) Toulon	6	1	0	5	9	39	−30	64	269	−205	0	1	5

22 October 2005
15:00

București (Romania)	16–20	(France) Toulon

Steaua Stadium
Attendance: 500

22 October 2005
19:00

Bayonne (France)	10–26	(England) Gloucester

Stade Jean Dauger
Attendance: 5,000

29 October 2005
15:00

Gloucester (England)	106–3	(Romania) București

Kingsholm
Attendance: 7,500

29 October 2005
18:30

Toulon (France)	19–28	(France) Bayonne

Stade Mayol
Attendance: 5,000

10 December 2005
14:00

București (Romania)	10–38	(France) Bayonne

Steaua Stadium
Attendance: 600

10 December 2005
18:30

Toulon (France)	3–74	(England) Gloucester

Stade Mayol
Attendance: 4,200

16 December 2005
19:30

Bayonne (France)	45–6	(Romania) București

Stade Jean Dauger
Attendance: 1,200

17 December 2005
15:00

Gloucester (England)	66–5	(France) Toulon

Kingsholm
Attendance: 9,037

13 January 2006
19:00

Bayonne (France)	62–0	(France) Toulon

Stade Jean Dauger
Attendance: 4,000

14 January 2006
14:00

București (Romania)	13–27	(England) Gloucester

Steaua Stadium
Attendance: 700

21 January 2006
14:00

Gloucester (England)	32–19	(France) Bayonne

Kingsholm
Attendance: 8,000

21 January 2006
15:00

Toulon (France)	17–23	(Romania) București

Stade Mayol
Attendance: 1,000

=== Pool 4 ===
Team	P	W	D	L	Tries for	Tries against	Try diff	Points for	Points against	Points diff	TB	LB	Pts
(England) Newcastle Falcons (2)	6	6	0	0	44	10	34	324	81	243	4	0	28
(France) Brive (8)	6	3	0	3	30	19	11	203	169	34	4	2	18
(Scotland) Borders	6	3	0	3	19	23	−4	155	177	−22	2	1	15
(Italy) L'Aquila	6	0	0	6	14	55	−41	103	358	−255	0	1	1

22 October 2005
14:30

Newcastle Falcons (England)	51–19	(France) Brive

Kingston Park
Attendance: 6,080

22 October 2005
15:00

L'Aquila (Italy)	25–32	(Scotland) Borders

Stadio Communale Frattem
Attendance: 1,000

29 October 2005
18:30

Brive (France)	64–22	(Italy) L'Aquila

Parc Municipal des Sports
Attendance: 4,107

30 October 2005
16:00

Borders (Scotland)	11–26	(England) Newcastle Falcons

Netherdale
Attendance: 4,029

10 December 2005
15:00

L'Aquila (Italy)	0–86	(England) Newcastle Falcons

Stadio Communale Frattem
Attendance: 1,000

11 December 2005
16:00

Borders (Scotland)	25–22	(France) Brive

Netherdale
Attendance: 1,050

17 December 2005
18:30

Brive (France)	34–28	(Scotland) Borders

Parc Municipal des Sports
Attendance: 5,850

18 December 2005
14:30

Newcastle Falcons (England)	90–14	(Italy) L'Aquila

Kingston Park
Attendance: 5,216

14 January 2006
15:00

L'Aquila (Italy)	19–47	(France) Brive

Stadio Tommaso Fattori
Attendance: 800

15 January 2006
14:30

Newcastle Falcons (England)	47–20	(Scotland) Borders

Kingston Park
Attendance: 5,866

21 January 2006
14:00

Borders (Scotland)	39–23	(Italy) L'Aquila

Netherdale
Attendance: 923

21 January 2006
15:00

Brive (France)	17–24	(England) Newcastle Falcons

Parc Municipal des Sports
Attendance: 6,700

=== Pool 5 ===
Team	P	W	D	L	Tries for	Tries against	Try diff	Points for	Points against	Points diff	TB	LB	Pts
(England) Worcester Warriors (5)	6	5	0	1	24	12	12	181	103	78	3	1	25
(Ireland) Connacht (7)	6	4	0	2	25	14	11	190	119	71	3	1	20
(Italy) Catania	6	2	0	4	15	41	−26	116	257	−141	1	1	8
(France) Montpellier	6	1	0	5	26	23	3	170	178	−8	2	2	7

22 October 2005
14:00

Worcester Warriors (England)	36–18	(France) Montpellier

Sixways
Attendance: 6,078

22 October 2005
14:30

Connacht (Ireland)	62–17	(Italy) Catania

Sportsground
Attendance: 600

28 October 2005
19:30

Montpellier (France)	13–19	(Ireland) Connacht

Stade Sabathé
Attendance: 2,000

29 October 2005
16:00

Catania (Italy)	14–19	(England) Worcester Warriors

Stadio Santa Maria Goretti
Attendance: 900

9 December 2005
19:30

Montpellier (France)	74–12	(Italy) Catania

Stade Sabathé
Attendance: 1,000

10 December 2005
14:00

Worcester Warriors (England)	30–20	(Ireland) Connacht

Sixways
Attendance: 6,137

17 December 2005
14:00

Connacht (Ireland)	22–21	(England) Worcester Warriors

Sportsground
Attendance: 2,200

18 December 2005
15:00

Catania (Italy)	37–34	(France) Montpellier

Stadio Santa Maria Goretti
Attendance: 400

14 January 2006
14:00

Connacht (Ireland)	43–10	(France) Montpellier

Sportsground
Attendance: 2,500

14 January 2006
14:00

Worcester Warriors (England)	44–8	(Italy) Catania

Sixways
Attendance: 600

20 January 2006
19:30

Catania (Italy)	28–24	(Ireland) Connacht

Stadio Santa Maria Goretti
Attendance: 900

20 January 2006
19:30

Montpellier (France)	21–31	(England) Worcester Warriors

Stade Sabathé
Attendance: 2,500

== Seeding and runners-up ==
Seed	Pool Winners	Pts	TF	+/-
1	(England) Gloucester	29	49	+278
2	(England) Newcastle Falcons	28	44	+243
3	(England) London Irish	27	32	+158
4	(England) Northampton Saints	25	32	+98
5	(England) Worcester Warriors	25	24	+78
Seed	Pool Runners-up	Pts	TF	+/-
6	(France) Bayonne	20	31	+109
7	(Ireland) Connacht	20	25	+71
8	(France) Brive	18	30	+34
–	(France) Narbonne	18	16	+12
–	(France) Agen	14	16	+20

== See also ==
- European Challenge Cup
- 2005–06 Heineken Cup
