= History of rugby union matches between Australia and the Barbarians =

Australia and the Barbarians have played each other 12 times, of which Australia has won the most, with nine victories.

The first match between the teams was played at Cardiff Arms Park on 31 January 1948 as a fundraiser to help pay for the Australian team's matches in Canada on their way home. The Barbarians won 9–6, and the match began a tradition for teams from the Southern Hemisphere to end tours of the British Isles with a match against the Barbarians.

== Summary ==
The summary below is for all matches where test caps were awarded by both national unions, which leaves out all 24 meetings from 1920 to 1928, in which the governing New Zealand Rugby Union fielded the second level New Zealand XV team rather than the highest All Blacks team. The Australian Rugby Union retroactively awarded test status caps to its own players for those matches.

=== Overall ===
Details	Played	Won by Australia	Won by Barbarians	Drawn	Australia points	Barbarian points
In Australia	2	2	0	0	86	35
In Great Britain	12	9	3	0	349	227
Overall	14	11	3	0	435	262

=== Records ===
Note: Date shown in brackets indicates when the record was or last set.

Record	Australia	Barbarians
Longest winning streak	10 (15 December 1984 – present)	2 (31 January 1948 – 28 January 1967)
Largest points for
Home	55 (6 June 2009)	36 (1 November 2014)
Away	60 (26 November 2011)	28 (28 October 2017)
Largest winning margin
Home	48 (6 June 2009)	12 (24 January 1976)
Away	49 (26 November 2011)	—
Most aggregate points
84 (Barbarians 35–49 Australia) (28 November 2001)

== Matches ==
No.	Date	Venue	Score	Winner	Competition
1	31 January 1948	Cardiff Arms Park, Cardiff	9–6	Barbarians	1947–48 Australia tour of Great Britain, Ireland, France and North America
2	22 February 1958	Cardiff Arms Park, Cardiff	11–6	Barbarians	1957–58 Australia tour of Great Britain, Ireland and France
3	28 January 1967	Cardiff Arms Park, Cardiff	11–17	Australia	1966–67 Australia tour of Great Britain, Ireland and France
4	24 January 1976	Cardiff Arms Park, Cardiff	19–7	Barbarians	1975–76 Australia tour of Great Britain, Ireland and the United States
5	15 December 1984	Cardiff Arms Park, Cardiff	30–37	Australia	1984 Australia tour of Great Britain and Ireland
6	26 November 1988	Cardiff Arms Park, Cardiff	22–40	Australia	1988 Australia tour of Great Britain and Italy
7	28 November 1992	Twickenham Stadium, London	20–30	Australia	1992 Australia tour of Great Britain and Ireland
8	7 December 1996	Twickenham Stadium, London	12–39	Australia	1996 Australia tour of Great Britain, Ireland and Italy
9	28 November 2001	Millennium Stadium, Cardiff	35–49	Australia	2001 Australia tour of Great Britain, France and Spain
10	3 December 2008	Wembley Stadium, London	11–18	Australia	2008 Australia tour of Great Britain, Italy and France
11	6 June 2009	Sydney Football Stadium, Sydney	55–7	Australia	2009 Summer International
12	26 November 2011	Twickenham Stadium, London	11–60	Australia	2011 Autumn International
13	1 November 2014	Twickenham Stadium, London	36–40	Australia	2014 Autumn International
14	28 October 2017	Sydney Football Stadium, Sydney	31–28	Australia	2017 Autumn International
