= History of rugby union matches between Australia and Wales =

Australia and Wales before their first Test match in 1908

Since 1908, Australia and Wales have gone head-to-head in rugby union Test matches. The two have contested the James Bevan Trophy on each encounter outside a Rugby World Cup since 2007. Australia currently hold the statistical advantage (and have since 1996), having won over 30 Test matches to Wales' 14.

== History ==
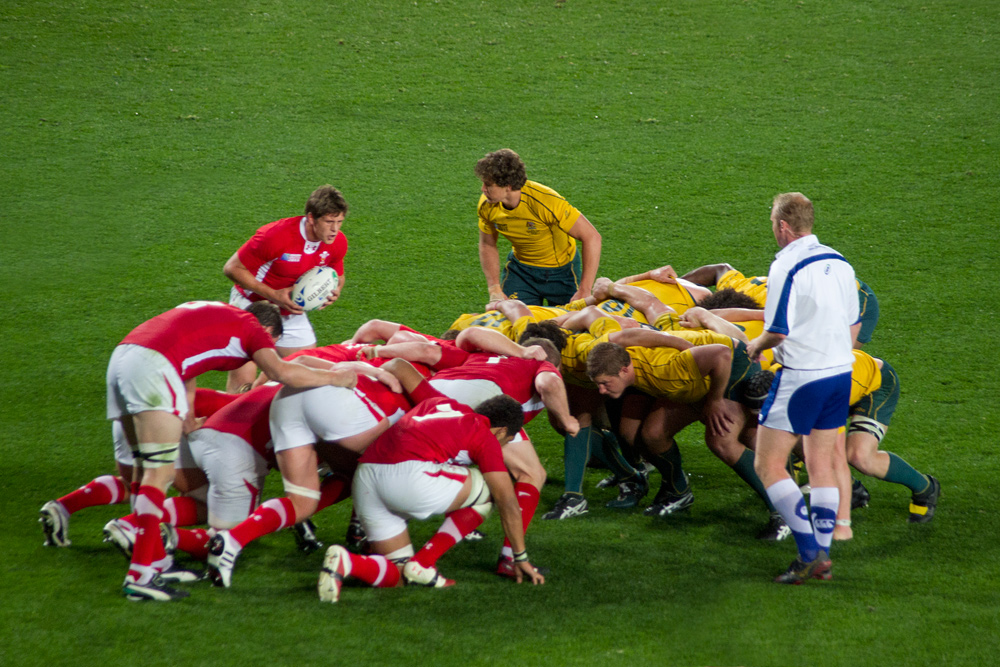
A scrum between Australia and Wales at the 2011 Rugby World Cup

In the first 70 years, Wales won six of the eight matches. Over the next 10 years it was fairly even, but since the first World Cup in 1987, Australia has dominated by 26 wins to 6. The 2006 match ended in the second highest-scoring draw of all time, 29–29.

Australia snatched victory in the inaugural James Bevan Trophy test match 29–23 with a last minute try at the Telstra Stadium in Sydney on 26 May 2007. They followed this up with a 31–0 victory at Suncorp Stadium in Brisbane.

Wales captured the trophy the following year with a 21–18 victory in Cardiff, but since then it remained in Australian hands with 13 consecutive wins. Three victories in Cardiff in 2009–11 were followed up by a 3–0 series win in Australia in 2012, all by narrow margins. In the return match at Cardiff, Australia once again won with a last minute try.

The 2011 Rugby World Cup brought Australia and Wales together again for another third-place play-off, and once again it was a close finish, with Australia claiming third place in a reversal of the first World Cup in 1987, when Wales won the play-off 22–21.

Wales ended a run of 13 consecutive defeats against Australia on 10 November 2018, winning 9–6. They have since defeated Australia 29–25 in the 2019 Rugby World Cup, 29–28 in Cardiff on 20 November 2021 and a record 40–6 in the 2023 Rugby World Cup.

== Summary ==
=== Overview ===
Details	Played	Won by Australia	Won by Wales	Drawn	Australia points	Wales points
In Australia	14	13	1	0	437	216
In Wales	31	20	10	1	694	525
Neutral venue	5	2	3	0	88	115
Overall	50	35	14	1	1,219	856

=== Records ===
Note: Date shown in brackets indicates when the record was or last set.

Record	Australia	Wales
Longest winning streak	13 (28 Nov 2009 – 10 Nov 2018)	3 (21 Jun 1969 – 11 Jun 1978)
Largest points for
Home	63 (22 July 1991)	34 (26 November 2022)
Away	52 (17 November 2024)	40 (24 September 2023)
Largest winning margin
Home	57 (22 July 1991)	25 (20 December 1975)
Away	35 (12 October 1991)	34 (24 September 2023)

== Results ==
No.	Date	Venue	Score	Winner	Competition
1	12 December 1908	National Stadium, Cardiff	9–6	Wales	1908–09 Australia tour of Great Britain
2	26 November 1927	National Stadium, Cardiff	8–18	Australia	1927–28 Waratahs tour of Europe and North America
3	20 December 1947	National Stadium, Cardiff	6–0	Wales	1947–48 Australia tour of Europe and North America
4	4 January 1958	National Stadium, Cardiff	9–3	Wales	1957–58 Australia tour of Great Britain, Ireland and France
5	3 December 1966	National Stadium, Cardiff	11–14	Australia	1966–67 Australia tour of Great Britain, Ireland and France
6	21 June 1969	Sydney Cricket Ground, Sydney	16–19	Wales	1969 Wales tour of Australia, New Zealand and Fiji
7	10 November 1973	National Stadium, Cardiff	24–0	Wales	1973 Australia tour of Great Britain and Italy
8	20 December 1975	National Stadium, Cardiff	28–3	Wales	1975–76 Australia tour of Great Britain, Ireland and North America
9	11 June 1978	Ballymore Stadium, Brisbane	18–8	Australia	1978 Wales tour of Australia
10	17 June 1978	Sydney Cricket Ground, Sydney	19–17	Australia	1978 Wales tour of Australia
11	5 December 1981	National Stadium, Cardiff	18–13	Wales	1981–82 Australia tour of Great Britain and Ireland
12	24 November 1984	National Stadium, Cardiff	9–28	Australia	1984 Australia tour of Great Britain and Ireland
13	18 June 1987	Rotorua Int. Stadium, Rotorua (New Zealand)	21–22	Wales	1987 Rugby World Cup
14	22 July 1991	Ballymore Stadium, Brisbane	63–6	Australia	1991 Wales tour of Australia
15	12 October 1991	National Stadium, Cardiff	3–38	Australia	1991 Rugby World Cup
16	21 November 1992	National Stadium, Cardiff	6–23	Australia	1992 Australia tour of Great Britain and Ireland
17	9 June 1996	Ballymore Stadium, Brisbane	56–25	Australia	1996 Wales tour of Australia
18	22 June 1996	Sydney Football Stadium, Sydney	42–3	Australia	1996 Wales tour of Australia
19	1 December 1996	National Stadium, Cardiff	19–28	Australia	1996 Australia tour of Great Britain, Ireland and Italy
20	23 October 1999	Millennium Stadium, Cardiff	9–24	Australia	1999 Rugby World Cup
21	25 November 2001	Millennium Stadium, Cardiff	13–21	Australia	2001 Australia tour of Europe
22	14 June 2003	Stadium Australia, Sydney	30–10	Australia	2003 Wales tour of Australia and New Zealand
23	26 November 2005	Millennium Stadium, Cardiff	24–22	Wales	2005 Autumn International
24	4 November 2006	Millennium Stadium, Cardiff	29–29	draw	2006 Autumn International
25	26 May 2007	Stadium Australia, Sydney	29–23	Australia	2007 Wales tour of Australia
26	2 June 2007	Lang Park, Brisbane	31–0	Australia	2007 Wales tour of Australia
27	15 September 2007	Millennium Stadium, Cardiff	20–32	Australia	2007 Rugby World Cup
28	29 November 2008	Millennium Stadium, Cardiff	21–18	Wales	2008 Autumn International
29	28 November 2009	Millennium Stadium, Cardiff	12–33	Australia	2009 Autumn International
30	6 November 2010	Millennium Stadium, Cardiff	16–25	Australia	2010 Autumn International
31	21 October 2011	Eden Park, Auckland (New Zealand)	21–18	Australia	2011 Rugby World Cup
32	3 December 2011	Millennium Stadium, Cardiff	18–24	Australia	2011 Autumn International
33	9 June 2012	Lang Park, Brisbane	27–19	Australia	2012 Wales tour of Australia
34	16 June 2012	Docklands Stadium, Melbourne	25–23	Australia	2012 Wales tour of Australia
35	23 June 2012	Sydney Football Stadium, Sydney	20–19	Australia	2012 Wales tour of Australia
36	1 December 2012	Millennium Stadium, Cardiff	12–14	Australia	2012 Autumn International
37	30 November 2013	Millennium Stadium, Cardiff	26–30	Australia	2013 Autumn International
38	8 November 2014	Millennium Stadium, Cardiff	28–33	Australia	2014 Autumn International
39	10 October 2015	Twickenham Stadium, London (England)	15–6	Australia	2015 Rugby World Cup
40	5 November 2016	Millennium Stadium, Cardiff	8–32	Australia	2016 Autumn International
41	11 November 2017	Millennium Stadium, Cardiff	21–29	Australia	2017 Autumn International
42	10 November 2018	Millennium Stadium, Cardiff	9–6	Wales	2018 Autumn International
43	29 September 2019	Tokyo Stadium, Chōfu (Japan)	25–29	Wales	2019 Rugby World Cup
44	20 November 2021	Millennium Stadium, Cardiff	29–28	Wales	2021 Autumn International
45	26 November 2022	Millennium Stadium, Cardiff	34–39	Australia	2022 Autumn International
46	24 September 2023	Parc Olympique Lyonnais, Lyon (France)	6–40	Wales	2023 Rugby World Cup
47	6 July 2024	Sydney Football Stadium, Sydney	25–16	Australia	2024 Wales tour of Australia
48	13 July 2024	Melbourne Rectangular Stadium, Melbourne	36–28	Australia	2024 Wales tour of Australia
49	17 November 2024	Millennium Stadium, Cardiff	20–52	Australia	2024 Autumn International
50	21 November 2026	Millennium Stadium, Cardiff	26–29	Australia	2026 Nations Championship

== List of series ==
Played	Won by Australia	Won by Wales	Drawn
5	5	0	0

Year	Australia	Wales	Series winner	James Bevan Trophy
1978	2	0	Australia	Not awarded
1996	2	0	Australia	Not awarded
2007	2	0	Australia	
2012	3	0	Australia	
2024	2	0	Australia	
