= Brett Robinson =

Brett Robinson may refer to:

- Brett Robinson (rugby union) (born 1970), Australian rugby union player and executive
- Brett Robinson (runner) (born 1991), Australian distance runner
