= Iwan Stephens =

English rugby union player (born 2002)

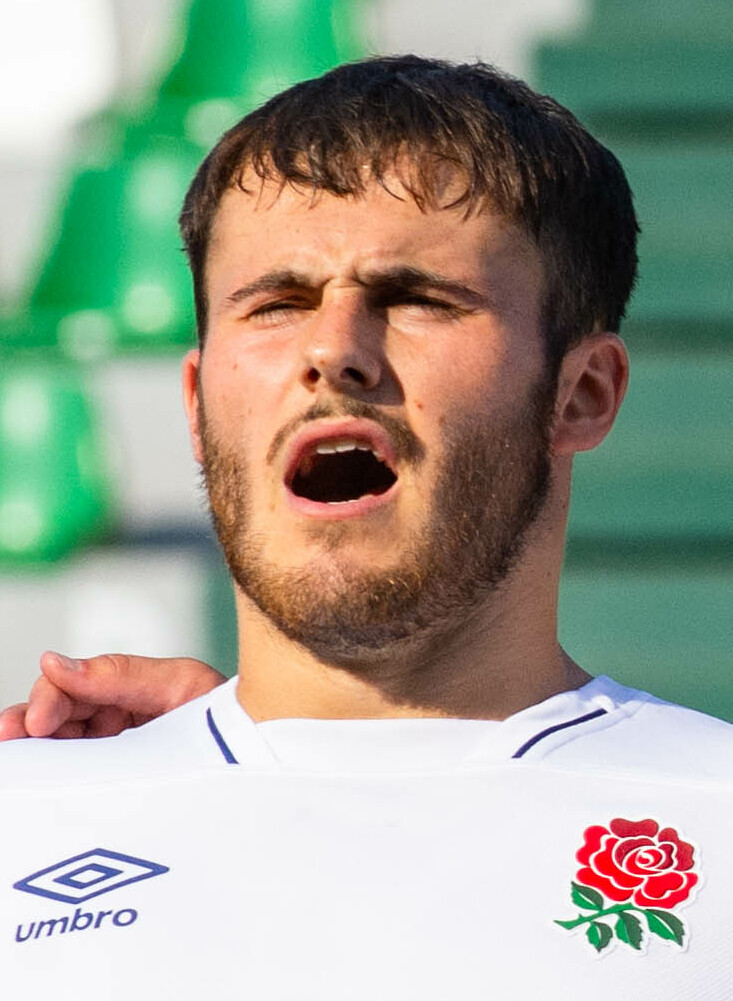
- Born: 24 March 2002 (age 24) Leeds, England
- Height: 170 cm (5 ft 7 in)
- Weight: 83 kg (13 st 1 lb)
- Notable relative: Colin Stephens (Father)

Rugby union career
- Position: Wing
- Current team: Cardiff
Youth career
- –2020: Leeds Rhinos
Senior career
Years	Team	Apps	(Points)
2020–2024	Newcastle Falcons	25	(55)
2024–	Cardiff	8	(15)
- Correct as of 19 October 2026
International career
Years	Team	Apps	(Points)
2022	England U20	5	(10)
- Correct as of 19 October 2026

Iwan Stephens (born 24 March 2002) is a professional rugby union player who plays as a wing for United Rugby Championship club Cardiff.

== Early life ==
Born in Leeds, Stephens began playing rugby league as an 11 year-old but also played rugby union for his local club Morley and was in the academy of Leeds Tykes until the age of fifteen. He is also a qualified joiner.

== Career ==
=== Newcastle ===
Stephens left Super League side Leeds Rhinos to join the academy at Newcastle Falcons in September 2020. Stephens scored a try on debut for Newcastle Falcons against Harlequins in September 2021. He followed that up with a try in his second match, against Bath Rugby the next weekend and was named in the Rugby Premiership team of the week. In April 2022, he signed a new two-year contract with Newcastle Falcons.

=== Cardiff ===
In May 2024 it was announced that Stephens would join Cardiff Rugby for the 2024–25 United Rugby Championship.

Stephens was named as Man of the Match on 26 October 2024, as Cardiff came back to beat Ulster, having been 0–19 down at half time, with Stephens scoring a try during the match.

== International career ==
=== Rugby League ===
Qualified to play for England or Wales, Stephens is a former England Academy rugby league international, and once scored a try and six goals in England Academy's 62-0 win over Wales in Llanelli.

=== England U20 ===
Stephens went on to represent the England U20 rugby union team, playing for the first time in March 2022 during the 2022 Six Nations Under 20s Championship. Later that year in July 2022 he scored his first try for England U20 in a 37-36 defeat against Ireland.

== Personal life ==
Stephens is the son of Welsh former rugby international Colin Stephens who after his rugby career became head of rugby at Leeds Beckett University.
