= George Kneipp =

Australian judge (1922–1993)

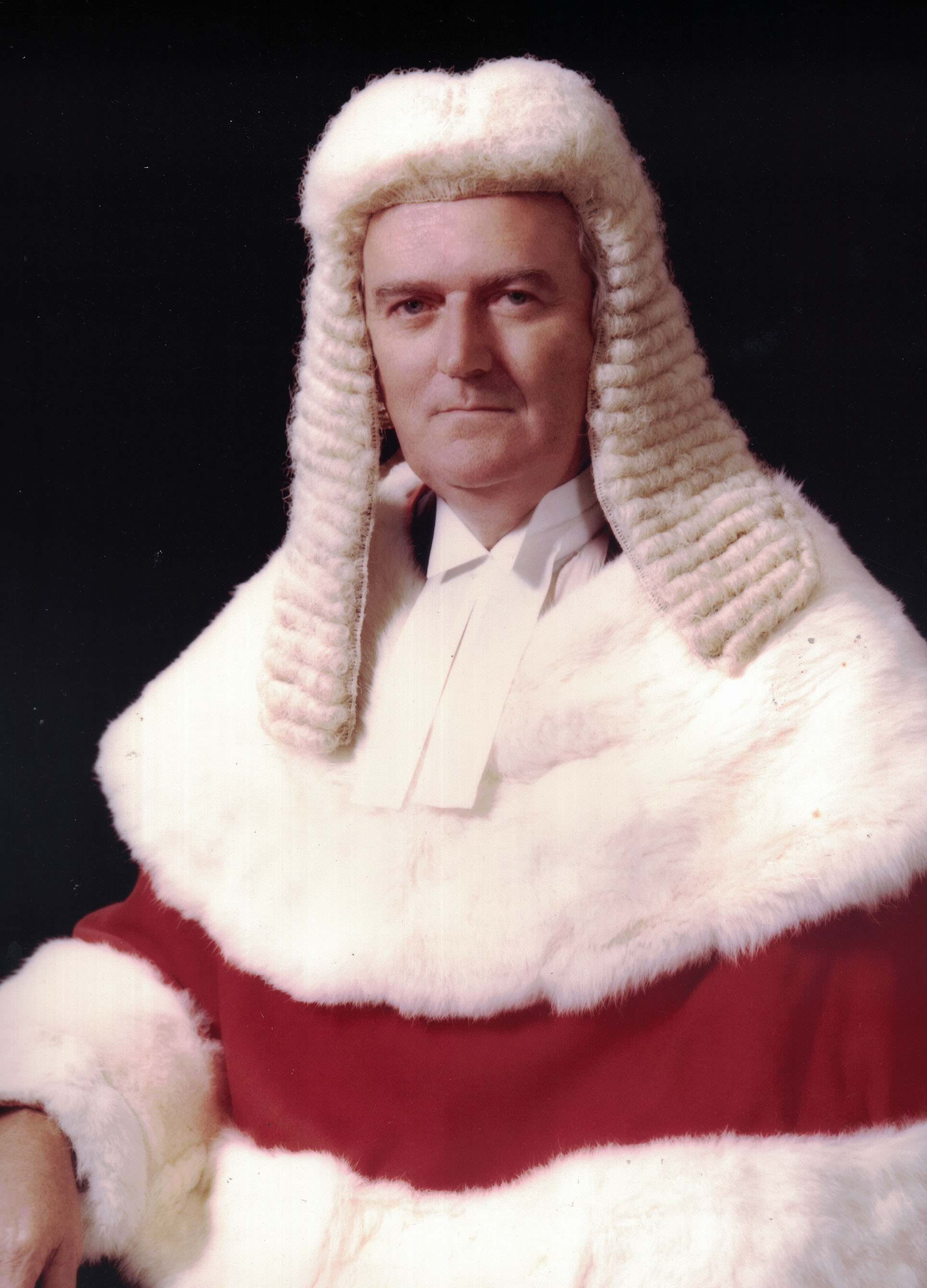
Sir George Kneipp

Sir Joseph Patrick George Kneipp (1922–1993) was a judge of the Supreme Court of Queensland in Townsville, Queensland, Australia from 1969 to 1992.

== Early life and education ==
Born in Inverell, New South Wales on 13 November 1922, son of Anthony George Kneipp, and his wife Kathleen Brigid, (née McHugh). Kneipp attended Downlands College in Toowoomba; where he was Dux of the school. After serving in New Guinea with 52nd Anti-Aircraft Regiment between 1943 and 1945, Kneipp attained his law degree from the University of Queensland in 1949 and was admitted to the Queensland bar in 1950.

== Career ==
After pursuing private practice as a barrister in Townsville, Kneipp was appointed a judge of the Supreme Court of Queensland on 6 November 1969. Kneipp served as Northern Judge for 22 years until his retirement at the age of 70, in 1992. He was also Chancellor of James Cook University, North Queensland from 1974 to 1993, where he called for the establishment of a law degree course in the late 1980s.

=== Bibliography ===
- Principles of sentencing: paper, Supreme Court and Federal Court Judges Conference, 7th 1978
- Damages, maintenance and the legal effect of inflation: introductory paper, Supreme Court and Federal Court Judges Conference 4th and 5th 1975-1976

== Honours ==
Kneipp was appointed a Knight Bachelor (Kt) in the 1982 Birthday Honours, for services to education and the community, and James Cook University awarded him an honorary Doctor of Letters in 1993.

== Legacy ==
James Cook University has memorialised Kneipp with a postgraduate law scholarship and have named an auditorium on the campus after him.

== Death ==
He died on 15 February 1993.
