= Downlands College =

Downlands Sacred Heart College
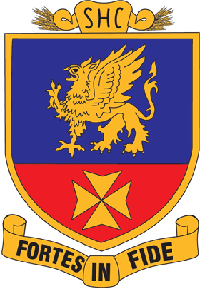

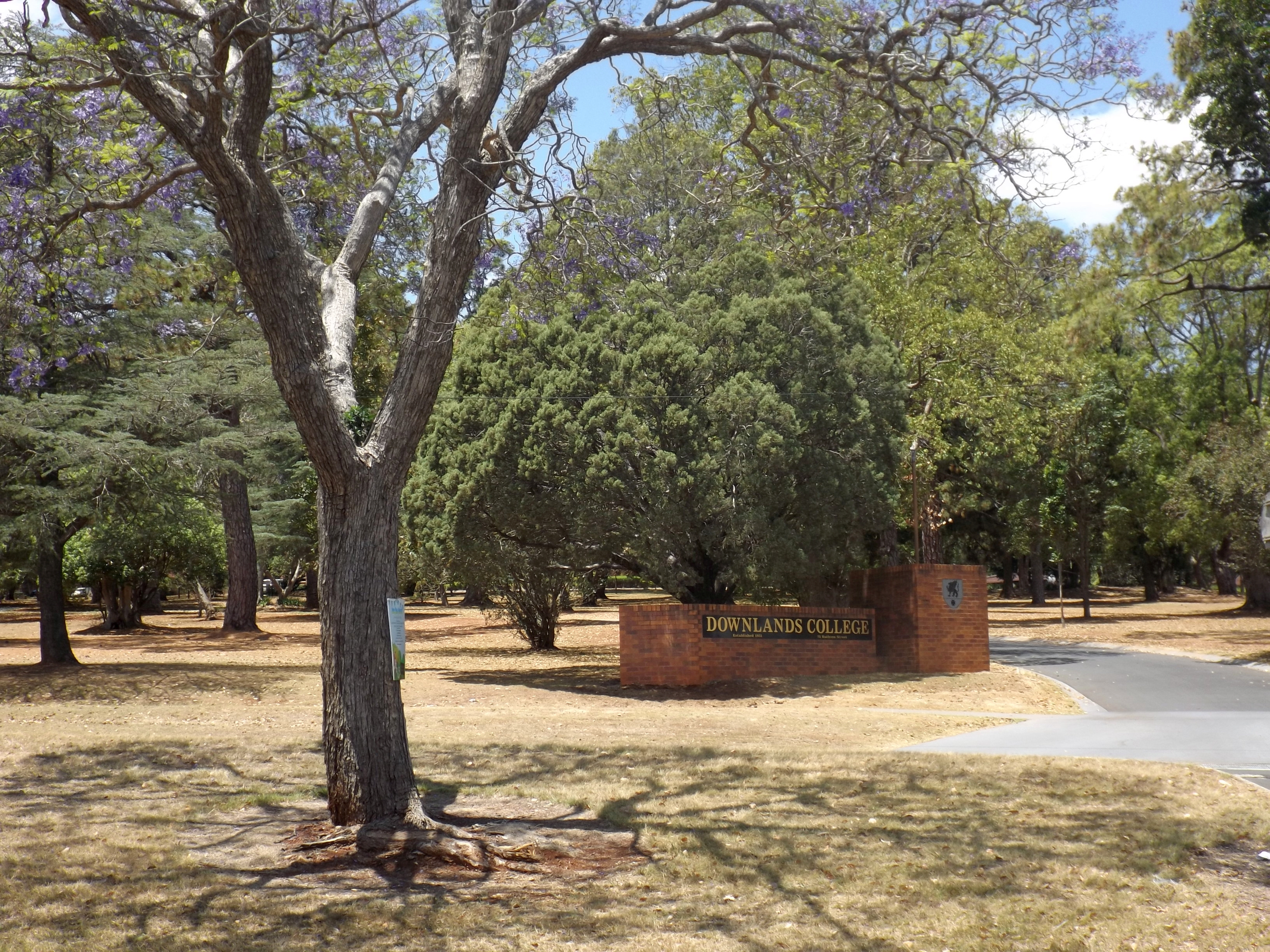
- Ruthven Street entrance, 2014

Location
- Toowoomba, Queensland; Australia; 27°32′07″S 151°57′27″E

Information
- Type: Private, secondary, day & boarding
- Motto: Latin: Fortes in Fide (Strong in Faith)
- Denomination: Catholic
- Established: 1931
- Founder: Jules Chevalier (founder of the MSC)
- Principal: Stephen Koch
- Grades: P–12
- Gender: Coeducational
- Enrolment: ~1400
- Colours: Royal blue, gold, and cardinal red
- Affiliations: Catholic Secondary Schoolgirls' Sports Association; Missionaries of the Sacred Heart
- Website: www.downlands.qld.edu.au

Downlands College, officially named Downlands Sacred Heart College, is a private, Primary school, secondary, coeducational, day and boarding school at Harlaxton in Toowoomba, Queensland, Australia. Founded by the Missionaries of the Sacred Heart in 1931, the college began as a boarding school for boys with a total enrolment of 68.

Downlands is Queensland's only Catholic, coeducational, day and boarding school years prep-12. The school offers boarding for both boys and girls and demand for co-educational boarding is high as it allows families and siblings to remain together. The school has an enrolment of approximately 290 boarders from regional Queensland, interstate and overseas, including indigenous students from communities such as Kowanyama and the Tiwi Islands. The school also provides casual boarding to its day students. Downlands College is one of the biggest boarding schools in Queensland.

== College badge ==
The Downlands College Badge consists of a horizontally-divided field in the College colours, royal blue and cardinal red. The upper of the shield carries a gold gryphon, and the lower half bears the Maltese Cross of the State of Queensland. The shield is surmounted by the heart crest with the letters SHC (Sacred Heart College) supported by a ram's horns and ears of wheat, to symbolise the college's setting in the Darling Downs. The college motto, Fortes in Fide, meaning Strong in Faith is emblazoned under the crest.

== House system ==
Downlands, like many Australian schools, uses a house system in the college. Students are randomly assigned to one of four houses which compete against each other during swimming and athletics carnivals, as well as a drama festival.

The Downlands houses are:

Name	Day/boarding	Colour
Vandel	Day/Boarding	
Piperon	Day/Boarding	
Treand	Day/Boarding	
Jouet	Day/Boarding	

== Extra-curricular activities ==
Downlands College is known as the School of Choice, offering an extensive and varied curriculum and co-curricular offering.

=== Sport ===
Downlands has long been recognised as one of the strongest sporting schools in Queensland. Rugby union, football (soccer), netball, cricket, tennis, touch football, softball, Australian rules football, hockey, basketball, athletics and swimming are the main sports played at the college, with a large number of students taking part in organised sport throughout the year. Downlands is a member of the Catholic Secondary Schoolgirls' Sports Association (CaSSSA). The college's mascot is the Gryphon, who makes appearances at certain inter-school competitions. Downlands also has a tradition of hosting the "O'Callaghan Cup". This is every year on 31 August, and has been a running tradition since 1950, when five friends first started it.

=== Arts ===
One of the newest facilities at Downlands is its large Performing Arts department, catering for all age groups. The College choirs and musical ensembles, as well as individual students, are regular participants in the Toowoomba Eisteddfod. Downlands runs a musical every two years with participation across all grades. Recent musicals include Legally Blonde (2024), The Addams Family (2022) Wicked (2020), Crazy For You (2018), Les Miserables (2016), High School Musical 2, Footloose (2008), The Wiz (2007), Disco Inferno (2006) and SherWoodstock (2005).

== Heritage listing ==
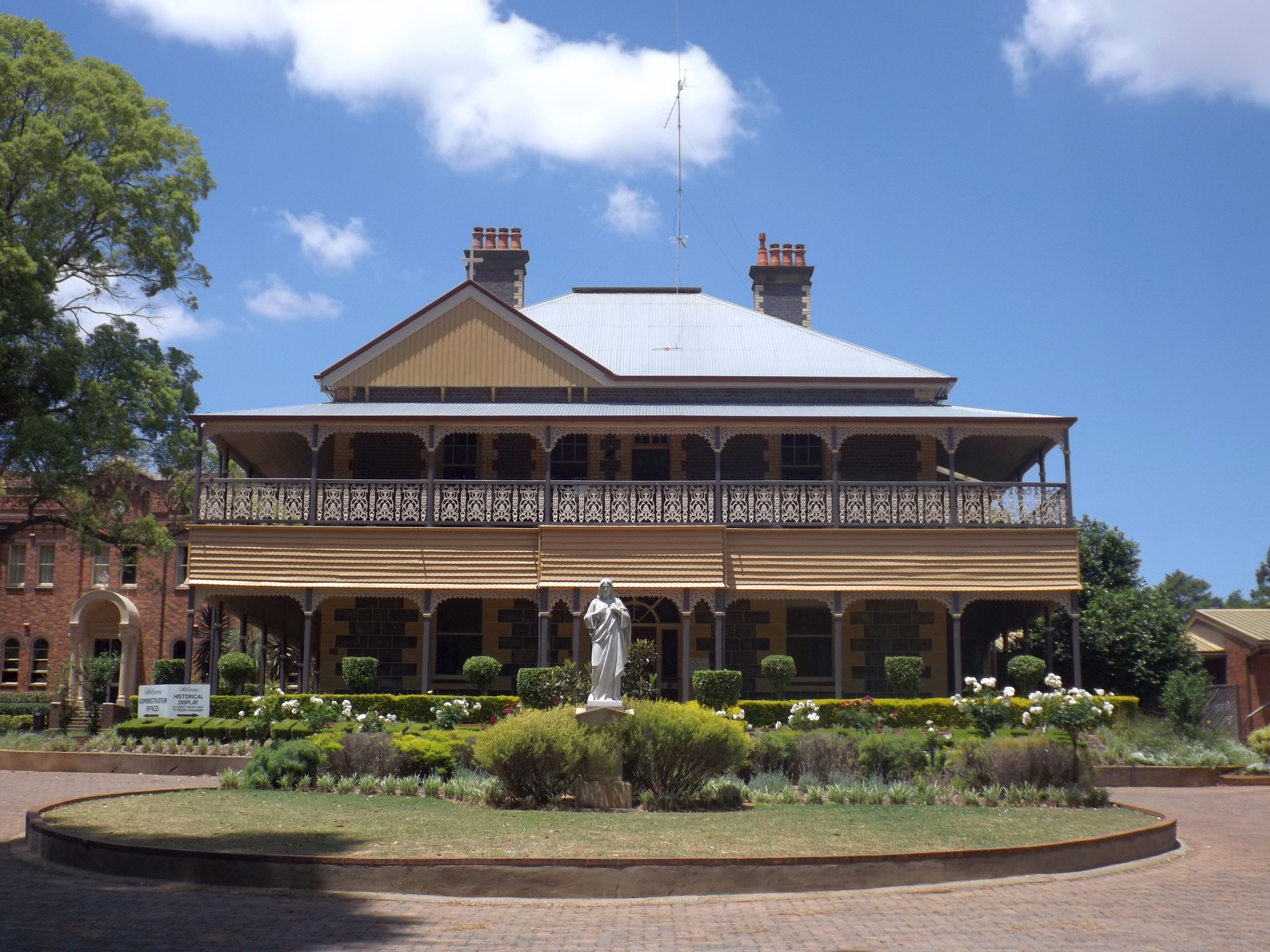
Tyson Manor, 2014

The grounds of the school contain the heritage-listed Tyson Manor.

== Principals ==
Years	Principal
1931–1935	R Hyland MSC
1935–1938	H Asprey MSC
1938–1945	J Doyle MSC
1945–1949	R Campbell MSC
1949–1956	V Dwyer MSC
1956–1962	T Kelly MSC
1962–1969	J Mooney MSC
1969–1974	Harold Baker MSC
1975–1981	Val Patterson MSC
1981–1986	James Littleton MSC
1987–1990	Roy O'Neill MSC
1991–1999	D McIntyre
2000–2005	Denis Uhr MSC
2006–2010	John Mulrooney MSC
2011–2018	Stephen McIllhatton
2019–present	Stephen Koch

== Notable alumni ==
- Senator Gerard Rennick – Federal Senator for Queensland, 2019–
- Mike Ahern AO – former Premier of Queensland
- Sir Gerard Brennan – Chief Justice of Australia 1995–1998
- Frank Brennan SJ, AO – Jesuit priest, human rights lawyer and academic
- Sir Walter Campbell – judge of the Supreme Court of Queensland, Chancellor of the University of Queensland, and Governor of Queensland
- Major General John Cantwell DSC, LOM, AO – Army officer, author and academic
- Brendan Doggett - Australian Test Cricketer
- Gene Fairbanks – rugby union
- Greg Holmes – rugby union
- Tim Horan – rugby union
- Michael Katsidis – professional boxer
- George Kneipp (1922–1993) – judge of the Supreme Court of Queensland, and Chancellor James Cook University
- Vince Lester – politician
- Ann Leahy – politician
- Garrick Morgan – rugby union
- Tony Nunan – CEO of Queensland Gas Company and Royal Dutch Shell in Australia
- Mary O'Kane – Australian scientist
- Mark O'Shea – one half of the country music duo O'Shea
- Will Power – international motorsports driver
- Dr Dan Pronk – Special Air Service Regiment Doctor and Author
- Peter Ryan – rugby union and rugby league
- Brett Robinson – rugby union
- Josh Smith – Australian rules football
- Dominic Tabuna – Nauruan politician
- Mac Grealy - Rugby Union
- Tom Veivers – cricketer and politician
- Dennis Manteit – Rugby League
