= John Morgan (rugby league) =

Australian rugby league footballer

Personal information
- Full name: John Morgan
- Born: 19 March 1941 (age 84); Sydney, New South Wales, Australia

Playing information
- Position: Second-row, Hooker
Club
Years	Team	Pld	T	G	FG	P
1963–70	Manly-Warringah	113	21	0	0	63
Representative
Years	Team	Pld	T	G	FG	P
1965	Australia	2	0	0	0	0
1965–70	New South Wales	5	1	1	0	5
1965	NSW City	1	1	0	0	3
- Source: As of 4 April 2019
- Relatives: Garrick Morgan (son)

John Morgan nicknamed "Pogo" is an Australian former professional rugby league footballer who played in the 1960s and 1970s. He played for Manly-Warringah in the New South Wales Rugby League (NSWRL) competition. He is the father of former rugby league and rugby union player; Garrick Morgan.

== Background ==
Morgan played his junior rugby league with Collaroy before being graded by Manly-Warringah.

== Playing career ==
Morgan made his first grade debut for Manly-Warringah in 1963. In 1965, Morgan was selected to play for Australia and featured in 2 tests against New Zealand. Morgan was also selected to play for New South Wales in 1965 and played in 3 games against Queensland.

In 1968, Manly finished second on the table with Morgan being a regular starter in the team. Morgan played in the 1968 NSWRL grand final against South Sydney. Manly were appearing in their 4th grand final but were still in search of their first premiership. Manly had beaten Souths a fortnight earlier to reach the grand final but in the decider Souths defeated Manly 13–9. Morgan did manage to score a consolation try which kept his side in the game.

In 1969, Manly finished in third place and reached the preliminary final before being defeated by eventual premiers Balmain. In 1970, Manly reached the grand final and again the opponents were South Sydney. Morgan played in the 1970 NSWRL grand final as Manly were defeated 23–12. The grand final defeat would also be Morgan's last game for Manly and he retired thereafter.
