= Anthony Ekert =

- Full name: Anthony John Ekert
- Born: 29 March 1969 (age 57) Sydney, NSW, Australia
- Height: 5 ft 11 in (180 cm)
- Weight: 182 lb (83 kg)
- School: Oakhill College
- University: University of Newcastle

Rugby union career
- Position: Scrum-half
Super Rugby
Years	Team	Apps	(Points)
1996	Waratahs	4	(5)
International career
Years	Team	Apps	(Points)
1992	Australia		

Anthony John Ekert (born 29 March 1969) is an Australian former professional rugby union player.

Born in Sydney, Ekert was a Roselea junior and played in the 1st XV of Oakhill College.

Ekert, a scrum-half, twice won Sportsperson of the Year at the University of Newcastle, where he studied for a degree in civil engineering, and while there earned a New South Wales call up for their 1991 tour of Argentina.

In 1992, Ekert represented Australia at the Hong Kong Sevens and was rewarded for his performance in a Sydney representative team's win over the touring All Blacks with Wallabies selection on the end of year tour, filling a position vacated by the retired Nick Farr-Jones. He was on the bench for the Tests against Ireland and Wales, with Peter Slattery preferred at scrum-half, but featured in five uncapped matches during the tour.

Ekert won Shute Shield premierships with Gordon in 1993 and 1995.
