= Tyson Manor =

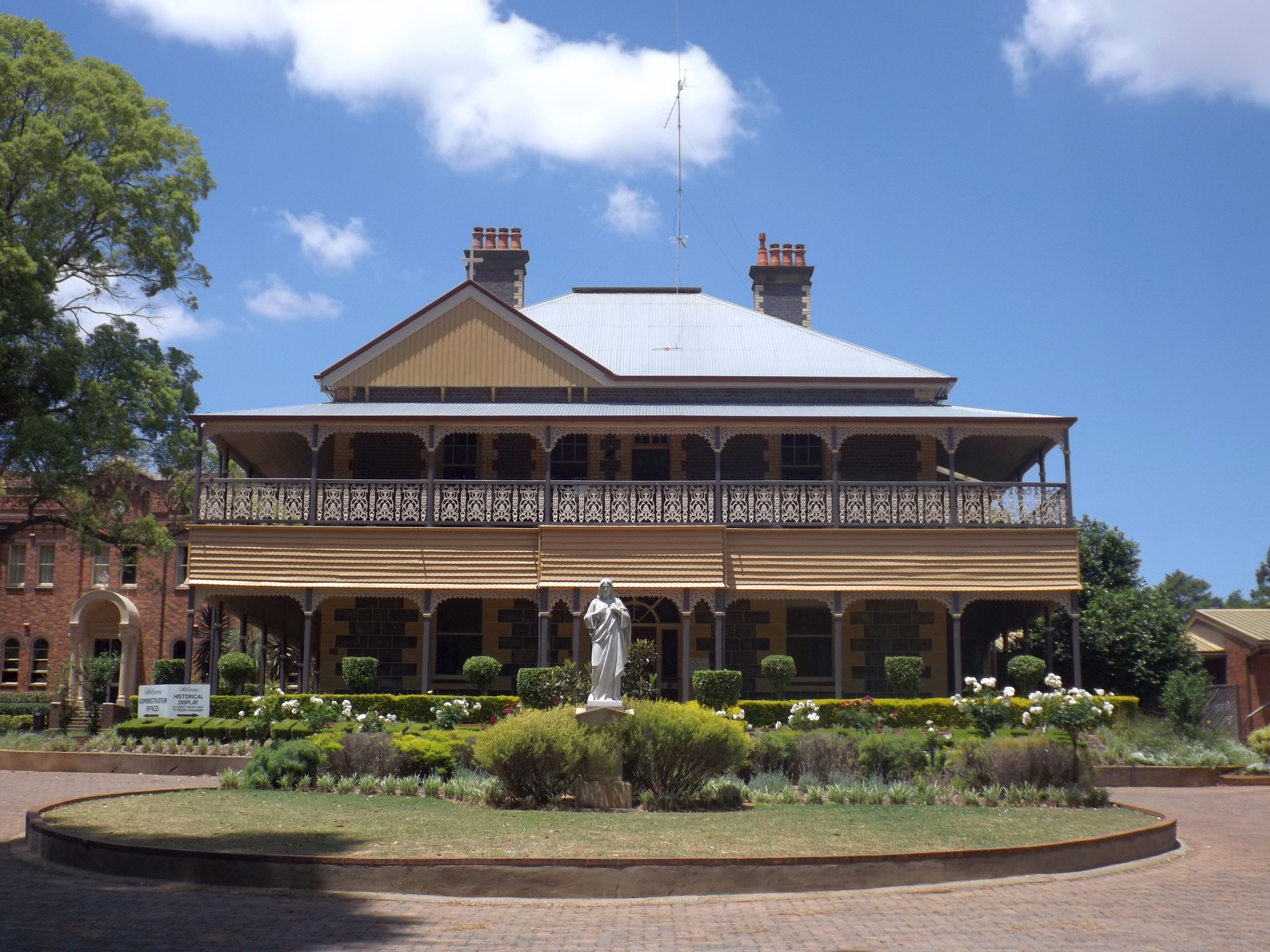
- Front view, 2014

- Location within Queensland Location within Australia
- 27.5364°S 151.9585°E
- Location: Ruthven Street, Harlaxton, Toowoomba, Toowoomba Region, Queensland, Australia

Queensland Heritage Register
- Official name: Tyson Manor – Strathmore
- Type: state heritage
- Designated: 21 August 1992
- Reference no.: 600864

Tyson Manor is a heritage-listed house at Ruthven Street with the grounds of Downlands College in Harlaxton, Toowoomba, Toowoomba Region, Queensland, Australia. It is also known as Strathmore. It was added to the Queensland Heritage Register on 21 August 1992. The heritage listing is currently under review.
