= Gareth Jenkins =

Wales international rugby union player (born 1951)

- Born: Gareth John James Jenkins; 11 September 1951 (age 75) Burry Port, Carmarthenshire, Wales
- Height: 185 cm (6 ft 1 in)
- Weight: 87 kg (192 lb)

Rugby union career
- Position: Flanker
Senior career
Years	Team	Apps	(Points)
1969–1986	Llanelli RFC	260	(199)
Coaching career
- Years: Team
- 1982–2003: Llanelli
- 2003–2006: Llanelli Scarlets
- 2006–2007: Wales

Gareth John James Jenkins (born 11 September 1951) is a Welsh former rugby union player and coach. Born in Burry Port, Carmarthenshire, he played for Llanelli RFC for 17 years from his debut in September 1969. He was appointed coach of the club in 1982. In 2003, he was appointed as coach of the newly formed Llanelli Scarlets regional side, guiding them to the Celtic League title in their first season. Following the resignation of Steve Hansen as coach of the Wales national team, Jenkins applied for the position and was one of two finalists only for Mike Ruddock to be appointed without applying. Jenkins finally took over as Wales coach when Ruddock resigned during the 2006 Six Nations, but his tenure was unsuccessful, winning just six of his 20 games in charge. He was sacked on 30 September 2007, the day after Wales failed to qualify for the quarter-finals of the 2007 Rugby World Cup. He returned to the Scarlets as their head of regional development and recruitment in June 2008.

== Playing career ==
Born in Burry Port, Jenkins played as a flanker for Llanelli RFC, Wales B side and the Barbarians. Jenkins also toured Japan with the Welsh national team in 1975, but was not capped. Jenkins made 259 appearances for Llanelli RFC since his debut as a 17-year-old, before his career was cut short by injury at the age of 26. Older than teammate Ray Gravell by a day, he was the second-youngest member of the Llanelli team that famously beat New Zealand 9–3 at Stradey Park in 1972.

Jenkins became player-coach of Furnace United RFC after he stopped playing for Llanelli RFC, coaching FURFC from 1977 to 1982; it was the most successful era for the club, as they were promoted from section E to section C of the West Wales league.

== Coaching career ==
=== Llanelli ===
During his 24-year stint as coach of Llanelli RFC, Jenkins won 13 Welsh Cup titles, a 1992–93 league and cup double (a first for a Welsh club) plus a 13–9 win over world champions Australia that same year. In 1998–99 and 2001–02 Llanelli won league titles and the newly formed regional side Llanelli Scarlets won the 2003–04 Celtic League title under his guidance. It was during this time he also led Llanelli to Heineken Cup semi-final places in 2000 and 2002. However, his team consistently fell just short in big games, notably in the Heineken Cup. He was also assistant coach of Wales during the 1993–94 season.

=== Wales national team ===
Jenkins was first proposed as a candidate for the job of Wales coach by First Minister of Wales Rhodri Morgan in 2002, following the departure of Graham Henry. Steve Hansen took over from Henry for the 2002 Six Nations, before being given the role on a permanent basis. When Hansen left after the 2004 Six Nations, Jenkins and Mike Ruddock were seen as the leading candidates to replace him. Jenkins was the only one of the five regional coaches to put himself forward for the role, and was one of 15 total applicants, along with Harlequins coach Mark Evans and former Canada coach Dave Clark; Jenkins and Evans were the only applicants invited for a second interview. Despite Jenkins being viewed as the front-runner for the position, the Welsh Rugby Union (WRU) approached Ruddock and named him as Hansen's successor ahead of Jenkins on 11 March 2004. Jenkins said he felt humiliated by the decision, and accused a member of the selection panel of "a complete lack of integrity", while Scarlets chief executive Stuart Gallacher criticised the WRU for their decision, saying Jenkins might have permanently lost the chance to coach Wales.

In October 2004, Jenkins was named as part of Clive Woodward's British & Irish Lions coaching team for their tour to New Zealand in 2005, with a specific focus on coaching the teams that would play in the midweek matches. He called the appointment "the pinnacle of [his] coaching career to date", following in the footsteps of his former Llanelli coach Carwyn James, who had led the Lions to a series victory over New Zealand on the 1971 tour. Jenkins was initially the only Welsh coach selected by Woodward, after the WRU barred all the members of the Wales coaching staff from being part of the Lions tour; they ultimately allowed Ruddock to be part of the Lions coaching team, but no other members of the Wales backroom staff, though Ruddock ultimately went on Wales' tour to North America instead. The Lions won all five of their midweek matches on tour, including a 109–6 victory over Manawatu; however, they lost the test series 3–0.

When Ruddock resigned as Wales coach two games into the 2006 Six Nations Championship, less than a year after leading Wales to their first Grand Slam since 1978, Jenkins distanced himself from the role, saying that he found it "very difficult to work with the group of people that manage Welsh rugby at this time"; however, he retained his aspirations of coaching Wales ahead of an extraordinary general meeting in April 2006. The WRU opened applications for the head coach position immediately after the final game of the Six Nations, with the players said to favour caretaker coach Scott Johnson. Former Italy coach John Kirwan expressed interest in the role, before ruling himself out, as did Cardiff Blues coach Dai Young, Western Force coach John Mitchell and Crusaders coach Robbie Deans, again leaving Jenkins as the leading contender on a six-man shortlist also believed to include Leeds Tykes director of rugby Phil Davies. On 27 April, after receiving assurances regarding the selection process, Jenkins was named as the new Wales coach on a two-year contract. Jenkins said he was proud to take the Wales job, but that it was difficult to leave the Scarlets after 37 years of involvement in Llanelli rugby. Phil Davies was appointed as Jenkins' successor as the Scarlets' director of rugby.

Jenkins' first duty as Wales coach was a two-test tour of Argentina in June 2006, for which he picked an inexperienced squad with an average age of 24. They lost the series 2–0; a 27–25 defeat in Puerto Madryn was followed by a 45–27 loss in Buenos Aires. On that tour, he gave an international debut to lock Alun Wyn Jones, who went on to become the most-capped player in rugby history. After returning from Argentina, delayed by a lost passport, Jenkins' first home test match saw a creditable 29–29 draw with Australia to start the 2006 Autumn internationals, followed by comfortable wins over the Pacific Islanders and Canada, before a 45–10 loss to New Zealand. In the 2007 Six Nations, Wales lost four of their five matches, including a 23–20 defeat against Italy; after that match, Jenkins criticised the officials for miscommunicating the amount of time left in the game as Wales spurned an opportunity to kick a penalty that would have tied the scores, instead opting to kick to touch in search of a game-winning try. Jenkins finally got a victory on the final day of the championship, beating England 27–18 to deny them the championship, while also avoiding the wooden spoon.

A test match series in Australia followed, which was lost 2–0 despite leading the first test by a point as the clock passed 80 minutes, only for Australia to score a winning try on the last play of the game. Wales won just one of their warm-up matches ahead of the 2007 Rugby World Cup, a 27–20 win over Argentina in Cardiff in revenge for the series defeat the previous summer, but a record 62–5 defeat to England at Twickenham saw Jenkins' position come under pressure. In a BBC documentary released a few days before Wales' first World Cup match against Canada, Jenkins admitted to worries that the WRU were thinking about sacking him, but that he was targeting a tenure of at least four years as Wales coach. Canada took a 17–9 lead after 45 minutes of that World Cup match, but Wales scored four second-half tries to win 42–17 in Nantes. Jenkins said after the game that he thought some of his players had been overawed by the occasion. Australia also took an early advantage in Wales' second match, leading 25–3 at half-time, but this time Wales were unable to complete the comeback, losing 32–20 at the Millennium Stadium. A 72–18 win over Japan five days later set up a decisive match against Fiji on 29 September, with the winner qualifying for the quarter-finals as runners-up of Pool B. Fiji won the match 38–34 thanks to a late try from Graham Dewes, their first victory in seven capped matches against Wales, knocking Wales out of the tournament. After the match, Jenkins spoke of his desire to continue coaching Wales, at least until the expiry of his contract after the 2008 Six Nations; however, Jenkins was sacked the following day, on 30 September 2007, informed of the WRU's decision by chief executive Roger Lewis and chairman David Pickering at the team's hotel car park. Former Wales coach Steve Hansen said the decision to sack Jenkins was "probably wrong", but Roger Lewis justified the move, saying Jenkins was not the right man to "take us forward over the next four or five years". Jenkins' assistant coach Nigel Davies was appointed as caretaker coach for Wales' match against South Africa in November 2007, a decision supported by Jenkins himself. Gareth Jenkins's tenure with Wales was a disaster. His unfortunate habit of stating the obvious or not being able to get his points across in interviews turned him in to a laughing stock. Jenkins was a proud and principled man and it was clear that coaching Wales had damaged him as he would never coach again.

=== Return to the Scarlets ===
In November 2007, Jenkins expressed interest in the head coaching role at Irish provincial side Ulster, following the resignation of Mark McCall; he was beaten in the selection process by former Scotland and Leinster coach Matt Williams. Jenkins spent a week working at London Welsh RFC in February 2008, but would not commit to any interest in a permanent role at the club. Following the sacking of Phil Davies as Scarlets coach at the end of the 2007–08 season, Jenkins was thought to be a leading contender to resume the role, but while chief executive Stuart Gallacher said Jenkins could return to the Scarlets, it would not be in a coaching capacity; the role ultimately went to Nigel Davies. Meanwhile, Jenkins expressed interest in the role of forwards coach with Munster, but ultimately returned to the Scarlets as their head of regional development and recruitment in June 2008, after realising that coaching had lost its "excitement" for him.
