= Tim Horan =

Australian rugby union footballer (b.1970)

Tim Horan AM
- Born: 18 May 1970 (age 56) Darlinghurst, Sydney, Australia
- Height: 1.83 m (6 ft 0 in)
- Weight: 93 kg (14 st 9 lb)
- School: Downlands College

Rugby union career
- Position(s): Fly-half, Inside centre
Amateur team(s)
Years	Team	Apps	(Points)
1989–2000	Souths		
Senior career
Years	Team	Apps	(Points)
- Saracens F.C.
Super Rugby
Years	Team	Apps	(Points)
1996–2000	Queensland Reds	119	(285)
International career
Years	Team	Apps	(Points)
1989–2000	Australia	80	(140)
1987	Australian Schoolboys		

Tim Horan AM (born 18 May 1970) is an Australian rugby union commentator and former player. He played for the Queensland Reds in the Super 12, and represented Australia. He was one of the best centres in the world throughout the 1990s due to his attacking prowess, formidable defence and playmaking ability. He became one of only 43 players who have won the Rugby World Cup on multiple occasions.

As well as inside centre, Horan also played fly-half and earned one international cap on the wing.

== Early career ==
Horan's rugby career began at Toowoomba's Downlands College under First XV coach John Elders, a former coach of England. The Downlands First XV of 1987 was undefeated throughout the year, including matches against Sydney's Kings, Riverview and St Joseph's colleges. The side also included future Wallabies Brett Johnstone, Brett Robinson, Garrick Morgan, and Peter Ryan.

He initially partnered Jason Little, with whom he wrote a book, Perfect Union and later in his career, Daniel Herbert. Horan and Little met when they were 13 years old, rooming together for a rugby league representative team.

Horan played a role in Australia winning the 1999 Rugby World Cup. He was voted player of the tournament (winning himself a year's worth of Guinness for scoring the fastest try).

== Wallabies career ==
His debut came in 1989 against New Zealand, where he impressed his opposite number, Joe Stanley. In his next Test, he and Little marked the experienced French pair of Franck Mesnel and Philippe Sella, and Horan scored his first two Test tries.

After winning the World Cup in 1991, in which he scored four tries and a successful Bledisloe Cup in 1992, the Wallabies endured a mixed 1993. 1994 saw Horan's career nearly end with a horrific knee injury in the Super 10 final and he would spend over a year in rehabilitation before making the squad to the 1995 World Cup defence in South Africa.

In 1996, he captained the national side for the first and only time and he also played at flyhalf. He missed the 61–22 loss to South Africa but returned for a 15-all draw with England, helping Ben Tune and George Gregan score a try apiece.

He peaked again for the 1999 Rugby World Cup against South Africa in the semi-final. He played against South Africa in a 27-21 extra-time win. This was followed by the second Wallaby World Cup win of his career.

2000 was to be his final Test year and was affected by injuries. He signed for English club Saracens.

== Retirement ==
Horan began a career as a newspaper columnist and broadcaster. Horan headed the Sports and Entertainment business in Private and Premium Banking for Westpac Banking Corporation until 2018 when he joined London based investment specialist River and Mercantile as Managing Director of its Australia and New Zealand operation. He is an ambassador for Spinal Injuries Australia, speaking to school children regarding prevention of spinal injuries. Horan is an ambassador for the Modified Rugby Program (MRP) that provides modified games of rugby for boys and girls with learning and perceptual difficulties. He is also ambassador for Aunties and Uncles - a non-profit organisation offering friendship, role-modelling and support for children in single parent or parentless families. He was inducted into the Sport Australia Hall of Fame in 2006, and in the 2009 Australia Day Honours he was appointed a Member of the Order of Australia (AM), "for service to Rugby Union football, particularly as an international representative player, and to the community through promoting awareness of spinal injury prevention and support for youth mentoring organisations."

== Personal life ==
Horan's father is Mike Horan, the former National Party and Liberal National Party Member of Parliament for the Queensland electoral district of Toowoomba South.

== Post-playing career ==
Tim Horan has been a commentator for Fox Sports Australia since September 2010. In 2011, Horan joined Triple M's Sunday Rugby show The Ruck with Matt Burke. In February 2021, Horan was announced as a part of the Stan Sport commentary team to cover Super Rugby AU.

== Honours ==
Horan was inducted into both the World Rugby Hall of Fame and the Australian Rugby Union Hall of Fame in 2015.

Preceded by John Eales	Australian national rugby union captain 1996	Succeeded by David Wilson
