= List of winners of multiple Rugby World Cups =

Since the inception of the men's Rugby World Cup in 1987, a total of forty five rugby union players have won the Rugby World Cup multiple times.

Five Australia players – John Eales, Phil Kearns, Dan Crowley, Jason Little and Tim Horan – were part of both the 1991 and 1999 Wallabies squads. They were joined by South Africa player Os du Randt, who played for the Springboks in their 1995 and 2007 victories. François Steyn became the second South African player to win the competition twice, in the 2007 and 2019 men's Rugby World Cups and narrowly missed out on consideration for the Springbok squad to attend the 2023 Rugby World Cup due to a knee injury sustained in March 2023.

In 2015, 14 New Zealand players won their second World Cup, having won in 2011. Richie McCaw became the first player to captain his nation to two titles.

After the 2023 Rugby World Cup win the number of double Rugby World Cup winners was increased by 24 South Africans, with Siya Kolisi becoming the second captain to lead a winning nation to a double back to back title. While that is a unique feat on its own, Kolisi however is the first to captain his nation to consecutive titles away from home, Japan 2019 and France 2023, as Richie McCaw won at home in New Zealand 2011 and defended the title away in England 2015.

As head coaches, both Steve Hansen and Wayne Smith were involved in New Zealand's 2011 and 2015 victories. And as head coaches, both Rassie Erasmus and Jacques Nienaber were involved in South Africa's 2019 and 2023 victories.

== List ==
| Name | Country | Years won |
|---|---|---|
| Dan Crowley | Australia | 1991, 1999 |
| John Eales | Australia | 1991, 1999 |
| Tim Horan | Australia | 1991, 1999 |
| Phil Kearns | Australia | 1991, 1999 |
| Jason Little | Australia | 1991, 1999 |
| Os du Randt | South Africa | 1995, 2007 |
| Dan Carter | New Zealand | 2011, 2015 |
| Ben Franks | New Zealand | 2011, 2015 |
| Owen Franks | New Zealand | 2011, 2015 |
| Jerome Kaino | New Zealand | 2011, 2015 |
| Richie McCaw | New Zealand | 2011, 2015 |
| Keven Mealamu | New Zealand | 2011, 2015 |
| Ma'a Nonu | New Zealand | 2011, 2015 |
| Kieran Read | New Zealand | 2011, 2015 |
| Colin Slade | New Zealand | 2011, 2015 |
| Conrad Smith | New Zealand | 2011, 2015 |
| Victor Vito | New Zealand | 2011, 2015 |
| Sam Whitelock | New Zealand | 2011, 2015 |
| Sonny Bill Williams | New Zealand | 2011, 2015 |
| Tony Woodcock | New Zealand | 2011, 2015 |
| François Steyn | South Africa | 2007, 2019 |
| Damian de Allende | South Africa | 2019, 2023 |
| Lukhanyo Am | South Africa | 2019, 2023 |
| Faf de Klerk | South Africa | 2019, 2023 |
| Pieter-Steph du Toit | South Africa | 2019, 2023 |
| André Esterhuizen | South Africa | 2019, 2023 |
| Eben Etzebeth | South Africa | 2019, 2023 |
| Steven Kitshoff | South Africa | 2019, 2023 |
| Vincent Koch | South Africa | 2019, 2023 |
| Cheslin Kolbe | South Africa | 2019, 2023 |
| Siya Kolisi | South Africa | 2019, 2023 |
| Jesse Kriel | South Africa | 2019, 2023 |
| Willie le Roux | South Africa | 2019, 2023 |
| Frans Malherbe | South Africa | 2019, 2023 |
| Makazole Mapimpi | South Africa | 2019, 2023 |
| Malcolm Marx | South Africa | 2019, 2023 |
| Bongi Mbonambi | South Africa | 2019, 2023 |
| Franco Mostert | South Africa | 2019, 2023 |
| Trevor Nyakane | South Africa | 2019, 2023 |
| Handré Pollard | South Africa | 2019, 2023 |
| Cobus Reinach | South Africa | 2019, 2023 |
| Kwagga Smith | South Africa | 2019, 2023 |
| RG Snyman | South Africa | 2019, 2023 |
| Duane Vermeulen | South Africa | 2019, 2023 |
| Damian Willemse | South Africa | 2019, 2023 |

== Country ==
| Country | Number of players |
|---|---|
| South Africa | 26 |
| New Zealand | 14 |
| Australia | 5 |
| Total | 45 |
