= Colin Stephens =

Welsh rugby player (born 1969)

- Full name: Colin J. Stephens
- Born: 29 November 1969 (age 56) Morriston, Wales
- Height: 171 cm (5 ft 7 in)
- Weight: 74 kg (11.7 st; 163 lb)
- School: Ysgol y Strade
- Notable relative: Iwan Stephens (son)

Rugby union career
- Position: Fly-half
Senior career
Years	Team	Apps	(Points)
1988–1995	Llanelli	212	(1,679)
1995–	Leeds		
- Huddersfield
- Sedgley Park
- Morley
International career
Years	Team	Apps	(Points)
1992	Wales	4	(9)
1991–1994	Barbarians	4	(35)
Coaching career
- Years: Team
- 2003–: Leeds Beckett University (director of rugby)
- Leeds Tykes (kicking)
- 2011–2012: Bradford & Bingley RFC (kicking)
- Rugby league career

Coaching information
Club
Years	Team	Gms	W	D	L	W%
2011–	Warrington Wolves (kicking)

Colin J. Stephens (born 29 November 1969) is a Welsh former rugby union player who played as a fly-half for Llanelli RFC and Leeds RUFC. Born in Morriston, Swansea, he was educated at Ysgol y Strade and played representative rugby for Wales Schools. He made his senior debut for Llanelli in January 1988, playing six times before the end of the 1987–88 season (four at fly-half, one at centre and one at full-back). He began the 1988–89 season sharing the number 10 shirt with Wales international Jonathan Davies, but following Davies' departure to rugby league at the start of 1989, Stephens took over on a permanent basis.

With Stephens at fly-half, Llanelli won the WRU Challenge Cup three years in a row from 1991 to 1993, the last of which was won as part of a league and cup double. In November 1992, Stephens was part of the Llanelli side that beat the touring Australia national team 13–9 at Stradey Park, kicking the conversion after Ieuan Evans' try, as well as two drop goals. Stephens also earned four caps for Wales, playing three matches in the 1992 Five Nations Championship, as well as a test against Australia in November 1992. He also played four times for the Barbarians, scoring 35 points.

In April 1995, Stephens broke an ankle in the Welsh Cup semi-final against Pontypridd, and later that year, he left Llanelli to join Leeds RUFC, who had also offered him a role as a development officer. He remained in the north of England, playing for Huddersfield, Sedgley Park and Morley, as well as taking up coaching positions with Leeds and Morley, and the Warrington Wolves rugby league side. In 2003, he was appointed as director of rugby for Leeds Beckett University, who won the BUCS rugby union title in 2015.
