= Garrick Morgan =

Australia international rugby union & league player

- Born: Garrick Jay Morgan; 25 January 1970 (age 56) Sydney
- Height: 201 cm (6 ft 7 in)
- Weight: 122 kg (19 st 3 lb)
- School: Downlands College; Marist College Ashgrove

Rugby union career
- Position: Lock
Youth career
- -: Downlands College
Senior career
Years	Team	Apps	(Points)
1998–02	Harlequins	81	(45)
2002–06	Pau		
Super Rugby
Years	Team	Apps	(Points)
1995–98	Reds		
International career
Years	Team	Apps	(Points)
1992–97	Australia	24	(15)
- Rugby league career

Playing information
Club
Years	Team	Pld	T	G	FG	P
1995	South Queensland Crushers	2				0
- Father: John Morgan

Garrick Morgan (born 25 January 1970), is an Australian rugby coach and former rugby footballer, who played rugby union for the Australian team from 1992 to 1997.

In 2006, he became coach of the Gold Coast Breakers. He is currently head coach of the Souths in the Queensland Premier Rugby competition.

== Career ==
=== Clubs ===
Morgan attended rugby nursery Downlands College before playing for the Souths in Brisbane, the Queensland Reds and the Wallabies. Following his Queensland Reds career he played for the Harlequins (1998–2002) where he was also captain. From 2002 to 2006 he also played for Section Paloise.

==== Rugby league career ====
In 1995, Morgan signed a three-year, $600,000 contract to play rugby league for the South Queensland Crushers. His father, John Morgan, had played for Sydney club Manly-Warringah from 1963 to 1970 and had also represented New South Wales on five occasions in interstate matches against Queensland.

Morgan made just two appearances for the Crushers before signing for the Queensland Reds at the end of the season and returning to rugby union.

=== With the Wallabies ===
Garrick Morgan played his first test match on 4 July 1992 against the New Zealand team (won 16–15) and his last test match on 26 July 1997 against the New Zealand team (lost 18–33 in Melbourne). Morgan was yellow carded in match in a 1992 against Munster while playing for Australia in Ireland.

== Honours ==
=== Club ===
- Winner of European Challenge Cup in 2000–2001.
- Finalist in European Challenge Cup 2004–2005.

=== With the Wallabies ===
- 24 caps
- 3 tries (15 points)
- Caps by year : 3 in 1992, 8 in 1993, 5 in 1994, 6 in 1996, 2 in 1997.
