= Orazio Arancio =

Italy international rugby union player

- Born: 15 November 1967 (age 58) Catania
- Height: 6 ft 3 in (1.91 m)
- Weight: 228 lb (103 kg; 16.3 st)

Rugby union career
- Position: Flanker
International career
Years	Team	Apps	(Points)
1993-1999	Italy	34	(10)

Orazio "Bimbo" Arancio (born 15 November 1967 in Catania) is a former Italian rugby union player and a current coach and sports director. He played as a flanker.

== Career ==
Arancio first played at Fiamma Catania, moving to Amatori Catania in 1986/87, where he would remain until 1995/96. He played for a season at Amatori Rugby Milano, in 1996/97, moving afterwards to the French side of RC Toulonnais, where he played in 1997/98. Returning to Italy, he played at Benetton Treviso for two seasons, from 1998/99 to 1999/2000, being Italian Champion in 1998/99. Arancio played two seasons at Rugby Bologna 1928 (2000/01-2001/02). He then returned to Amatori Catania, where he would play for four seasons, from 2002/03 to 2005/06. His final team would be San Gregorio Rugby, from 2006/07 to 2009/10, finishing his career aged 43 years old. He became player and head coach at the season of 2008/09. He was in charge of the team until 2011/12.

Arancio had 34 caps for Italy, from 1993 to 1999, scoring 2 tries, 10 points in aggregate. He was called for the 1995 Rugby World Cup, playing three games, and for the 1999 Rugby World Cup, playing two games.

He was team manager of the Italy national rugby sevens team, federal counselor of the Italian Rugby Federation and member of the federal counsel of the Italian National Olympic Committee. He was awarded the Golden Star of the INOC in 2006.
