= 2005–06 European Challenge Cup =

Event held in Europe

Tournament details
- Countries: England; France; Ireland; Italy; Romania; Scotland
- Tournament format(s): Round-robin and Knockout
- Date: 22 October 2005 – 21 May 2006

Tournament statistics
- Top point scorer(s): Shane Drahm (Worcester) (101 points)
- Top try scorer(s): James Simpson-Daniel (Gloucester) (9 tries)

Final
- Champions: (England) Gloucester (1st title)
- Runners-up: (England) London Irish

The 2005–06 European Challenge Cup was the tenth year of the European Challenge Cup, the second tier rugby union cup competition below the Heineken Cup. The tournament was held between October 2005 and May 2006.

== Group stage ==
=== Pool 1 ===
| Team | P | W | D | L | Tries for | Tries against | Try diff | Points for | Points against | Points diff | TB | LB | Pts |
|---|---|---|---|---|---|---|---|---|---|---|---|---|---|
| (England) Northampton Saints | 6 | 5 | 0 | 1 | 32 | 12 | 20 | 194 | 96 | 98 | 5 | 0 | 25 |
| (France) Narbonne | 6 | 4 | 0 | 2 | 16 | 11 | 5 | 125 | 113 | 12 | 2 | 0 | 18 |
| (England) Bristol | 6 | 3 | 0 | 3 | 26 | 21 | 5 | 203 | 150 | 53 | 3 | 1 | 16 |
| (Italy) Viadana | 6 | 0 | 0 | 6 | 9 | 39 | −30 | 81 | 244 | −163 | 0 | 1 | 1 |

=== Pool 2 ===
| Team | P | W | D | L | Tries for | Tries against | Try diff | Points for | Points against | Points diff | TB | LB | Pts |
|---|---|---|---|---|---|---|---|---|---|---|---|---|---|
| (England) London Irish | 6 | 6 | 0 | 0 | 32 | 11 | 21 | 239 | 81 | 158 | 3 | 0 | 27 |
| (France) Agen | 6 | 3 | 0 | 3 | 23 | 15 | 8 | 163 | 143 | 20 | 3 | 0 | 14 |
| (France) Pau | 6 | 2 | 0 | 4 | 12 | 19 | −7 | 107 | 153 | −46 | 2 | 1 | 11 |
| (Italy) Overmach Parma | 6 | 1 | 0 | 5 | 8 | 30 | −22 | 74 | 206 | −132 | 0 | 0 | 4 |

=== Pool 3 ===
| Team | P | W | D | L | Tries for | Tries against | Try diff | Points for | Points against | Points diff | TB | LB | Pts |
|---|---|---|---|---|---|---|---|---|---|---|---|---|---|
| (England) Gloucester | 6 | 6 | 0 | 0 | 49 | 6 | 43 | 331 | 53 | 278 | 5 | 0 | 29 |
| (France) Bayonne | 6 | 4 | 0 | 2 | 31 | 11 | 20 | 202 | 93 | 109 | 4 | 0 | 20 |
| (Romania) București | 6 | 1 | 0 | 5 | 7 | 40 | −33 | 71 | 253 | −182 | 0 | 1 | 5 |
| (France) Toulon | 6 | 1 | 0 | 5 | 9 | 39 | −30 | 64 | 269 | −205 | 0 | 1 | 5 |

=== Pool 4 ===
| Team | P | W | D | L | Tries for | Tries against | Try diff | Points for | Points against | Points diff | TB | LB | Pts |
|---|---|---|---|---|---|---|---|---|---|---|---|---|---|
| (England) Newcastle Falcons | 6 | 6 | 0 | 0 | 44 | 10 | 34 | 324 | 81 | 243 | 4 | 0 | 28 |
| (France) Brive | 6 | 3 | 0 | 3 | 30 | 19 | 11 | 203 | 169 | 34 | 4 | 2 | 18 |
| (Scotland) Borders | 6 | 3 | 0 | 3 | 19 | 23 | −4 | 155 | 177 | −22 | 2 | 1 | 15 |
| (Italy) L'Aquila | 6 | 0 | 0 | 6 | 14 | 55 | −41 | 103 | 358 | −255 | 0 | 1 | 1 |

=== Pool 5 ===
| Team | P | W | D | L | Tries for | Tries against | Try diff | Points for | Points against | Points diff | TB | LB | Pts |
|---|---|---|---|---|---|---|---|---|---|---|---|---|---|
| (England) Worcester Warriors | 6 | 5 | 0 | 1 | 24 | 12 | 12 | 181 | 103 | 78 | 3 | 1 | 25 |
| (Ireland) Connacht | 6 | 4 | 0 | 2 | 25 | 14 | 11 | 190 | 119 | 71 | 3 | 1 | 20 |
| (Italy) Catania | 6 | 2 | 0 | 4 | 15 | 41 | −26 | 116 | 257 | −141 | 1 | 1 | 8 |
| (France) Montpellier | 6 | 1 | 0 | 5 | 26 | 23 | 3 | 170 | 178 | −8 | 2 | 2 | 7 |

== Seeding and runners-up ==
| Seed | Pool Winners | Pts | TF | +/- |
|---|---|---|---|---|
| 1 | (England) Gloucester | 29 | 49 | +278 |
| 2 | (England) Newcastle Falcons | 28 | 44 | +243 |
| 3 | (England) London Irish | 27 | 32 | +158 |
| 4 | (England) Northampton Saints | 25 | 32 | +98 |
| 5 | (England) Worcester Warriors | 25 | 24 | +78 |
| Seed | Pool Runners-up | Pts | TF | +/- |
| 6 | (France) Bayonne | 20 | 31 | +109 |
| 7 | (Ireland) Connacht | 20 | 25 | +71 |
| 8 | (France) Brive | 18 | 30 | +34 |
| – | (France) Narbonne | 18 | 16 | +12 |
| – | (France) Agen | 14 | 16 | +20 |

== Knockout stage ==
=== Quarter-finals ===
31 March 2006
19:30

| Newcastle Falcons (England) | 23–3 | (Ireland) Connacht |

Kingston Park
Attendance: 4,486

1 April 2006
15:00

| Gloucester (England) | 46–13 | (France) Brive |

Kingsholm
Attendance: 6,898

1 April 2006
15:00

| Northampton Saints (England) | 25–34 | (England) Worcester Warriors |

Franklin's Gardens
Attendance: 9,531

2 April 2006
15:00

| London Irish (England) | 48–5 | (France) Bayonne |

Madejski Stadium
Attendance: 5,100

=== Semi-finals ===
22 April 2006
12:35

| Gloucester (England) | 31–23 | (England) Worcester Warriors |

Kingsholm
Attendance: 8,609

23 April 2006
12:35

| Newcastle Falcons (England) | 22–27 | (England) London Irish |

Kingston Park
Attendance: 4,243

=== Final ===
21 May 2006
12:15

| Gloucester (England) | 36–34 | (England) London Irish |

The Twickenham Stoop
Attendance: 12,053

== See also ==
- European Challenge Cup
- 2005–06 Heineken Cup
