= Warwick Waugh =

Australia inteenational rugby union player

- Born: Warwick William Waugh; 17 September 1968 (age 58) Queensland, Australia
- Height: 6 ft 8 in (2.03 m)
- Weight: 270 lb (120 kg)
- School: The Scots College

Rugby union career
- Position: Lock
- Current team: None
Senior career
Years	Team	Apps	(Points)
- Randwick
1999-2000	Bath	9	(0)
- Correct as of 24 January 2011
International career
Years	Team	Apps	(Points)
1993–1997	Australia	8	(5)
- Correct as of 24 January 2011

Warwick William Waugh (born 17 September 1968) is a former Australia national rugby union team player who played 8 tests for Australia between 1993 and 1997. His position was lock. He made his debut against the Springbok in Sydney during 1993 and he played his final match against Argentina national rugby union team. He also played for the Randwick Rugby Club.

Towards the end of his career Waugh played for Connacht Rugby in Ireland, joining the side from Béziers in 2002.
