= Amatori Catania =

Italian rugby union club

(Italy) Amatori Catania
- Full name: Amatori Catania Rugby
- Union: FIR
- Founded: 1963; 63 years ago
- Location: Catania, Italy
- Ground: Stadio Santa Maria Goretti (Capacity: 6,000)
- President: Guido Sciacca
- League: Serie A
Team kit	2nd kit

Official website
- amatoricataniarugby.com

Amatori Catania Rugby is an Italian rugby union club based in Catania. They are the only professional rugby union team in Sicily. The club was founded in 1963, and play at the Stadio Santa Maria Goretti.

Amatori Catania have thus far not won the Italian championship, but have qualified for European competition, competing in both the 2004–05 and 2005–06 European Challenge Cup seasons, defeating Montpellier and Connacht in the last season.

They currently competing in the Serie A.

== History ==
Between 1963 and 1965 the first team played in Serie C but won promotion to Serie B. In 1969–70 they won promotion to Serie A, but managed to survive at this level for only one season. From the 1972–73 season to the 1987–88 season, for sixteen consecutive seasons, he always plays in Serie A. After a season in Serie A2, he won the playoffs, obtaining again the promotion to Serie A, where he remained for seven years. In the 1996–97 season they were relegated back to Serie A2 and two years later back to Serie B but managed to return to Serie A four years later.

The 2004–05 season, mark the return to the top division, which in the meantime has changed its name to Super 10, under the technical guidance of Orazio Arancio. The Amatori Catania, guided by the head coach Jean-Michel Vuillemin, is the revelation team: from newly promoted to the semifinals, but they were knocked out by Benetton Treviso with the scores of 20–25 at the Santa Maria Goretti and 21–41 at the Monigo.

The following season was deemed more troubled despite the experience of the international head coach Laurent Rodriguez, but after a complicated start the Amatori Catania managed to hit a difficult salvation after a strenuous fight with the Veneziamestre which ended only on the last day. Worthy of note are the victories in the 2005–06 European Challenge Cup against Montpellier and Connacht at the Santa Maria Goretti.

In the 2007-08 season, the Amatori Catania, guided by Michel Ringeval, disputed a decidedly subdued league, which on the sixteenth day sees it relegated with mathematical certainty in Serie A.

== Statistics ==
=== European Challenge Cup ===
Season	Played	Won	Drawn	Lost	For	Against
2004–05	2	0	0	2	25	81
2005–06	6	2	0	4	116	257

== Selected former players ==
=== Italian players ===
Former players who have played for Amatori Catania and have caps for Italy:

- (Italy) Orazio Arancio
- (Italy) Ambrogio Bona
- (Italy) Benjamin de Jager
- (Italy) Alessandro Fusco
- (Italy) Elio Fusco
- (Italy) Jacob Gaina
- (Italy) Salvatore Garozzo
- (Italy) Marcello Gambino Urbanczyk
- (Italy) Andrea Lo Cicero
- (Italy) Massimiliano Perziano
- (Italy) Juan Manuel Queirolo
- (Italy) Diego Varani

=== Overseas players ===
Former players who have played for Calvisano and have caps for their respective country:

- (Argentina) Galo Alvarez Quiñones
- (Argentina) Lucas Barrera Oro
- (Argentina) Gonzalo Beccar Varela
- (Argentina) Gastón de Robertis
- (Italy) Marcello Gambino Urbanczyk
- (Argentina) Alejandro Krancz
- (Argentina) Juan Pablo Lagarrigue
- (Argentina) Benjamín Madero
- (Argentina) Carlos Neyra
- (Argentina) Horacio San Martín
- (Argentina) Fabián Turnes
- (Japan) Daniel Quate
- (Uruguay) Sebastian Levaggi
- (South Africa) André Joubert
- (Uganda) Jono Fabian
- (United States) Paul Emerick
