= Daniel Herbert =

- Born: 6 February 1974 (age 52) Brisbane, Queensland, Australia
- Height: 188 cm (6 ft 2 in)
- Weight: 100 kg (220 lb)

Rugby union career
- Position: Centre
Senior career
Years	Team	Apps	(Points)
2004–2005	USA Perpignan		
Provincial / State sides
Years	Team	Apps	(Points)
1993–2003	Queensland	124	
- Correct as of 24 June 2014
Super Rugby
Years	Team	Apps	(Points)
1996–2003	Queensland Reds	82	(85)
- Correct as of 24 June 2014
International career
Years	Team	Apps	(Points)
1994–2002	Australia	67	(55)

Daniel Herbert (born 6 February 1974) is an Australian rugby union administrator and former player who was appointed as the chair of Rugby Australia in November 2023. As a player, he played as a centre and won 67 caps for the Australia national team between 1994 and 2002, scoring 11 tries.

Herbert was born in Brisbane, Queensland. He was educated at Marist College Ashgrove, where he commenced his rugby career. Herbert won 67 caps playing at centre for the Australian national team since 1994. He made his test debut at the age of 20 against Ireland on 11 June 1994. He battled Jason Little for a state and test spot alongside Tim Horan before displacing him in 1998. Herbert went on to establish himself as the world's premier outside centre and was a key member of the Australian side that won the 1999 Rugby World Cup. He also played several test matches at inside centre.

Herbert was named in the 'Team of the World Cup 1999' alongside his centre partner, Tim Horan. Herbert was also awarded the coveted 'L'equipe International Player of the Year' in 1999. In 2001 Herbert was promoted to the role of Queensland Captain and Australian Vice-captain and in that same year scored a brace of tries in the third and deciding British Lions test and helped the Wallabies to their first ever series victory over the Lions. Known for his aggressive defence and line-breaking ability, Herbert revolutionised the role of a modern-day outside centre.

He was a vital part of the 'Golden Era' of Australian Rugby, which celebrated a World Cup victory, a British Lions series victory, a Rugby Championship and five consecutive Bledisloe Cups.

Herbert amassed 124 caps for Queensland Reds before leaving for the French side USA Perpignan for the season 2003–04. He only played 7 matches with Perpignan and suffered a very serious neck injury, which resulted in surgery in April 2004 and subsequently in Herbert's retirement from the game.

His brother Anthony was also an Australian rugby union representative player.

On 19 November 2023, Herbert replaced Hamish McLennan as the Chair of Rugby Australia, following McLennan's sacking from the position, and subsequent resignation from the RA board.
