= Stadio Santa Maria Goretti =

Sports venue in Catania, Italy

Coordinates: 37°28′30″N 15°04′03″E

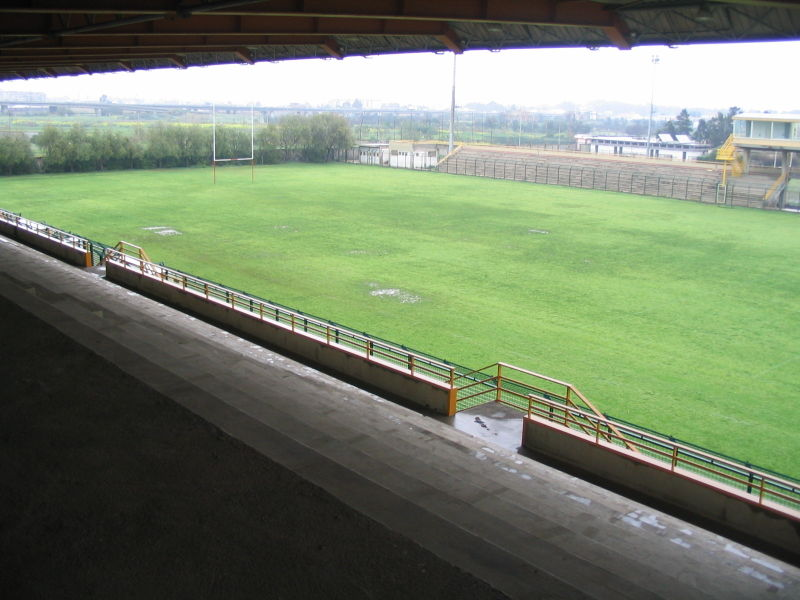

Stadio Santa Maria Goretti is a multi-use stadium in Catania, Italy. It is currently used mostly for american football and rugby union matches and is the home of Amatori Catania team. The stadium holds 10,000 persons and is named after the Catholic saint Maria Goretti.

== Trivia ==
In 2012, after the death of Benito Paolone (one of the founding fathers of Amatori Catania), the stadium has been renamed Stadio Benito Paolone.
