= Jason Little (rugby union) =

- Born: 26 August 1970 (age 56) Dalby, Queensland, Australia
- Height: 1.85 m (6 ft 1 in)

Rugby union career
- Position(s): Centre, Wing
Senior career
Years	Team	Apps	(Points)
- Gloucester Rugby
–	Bristol Rugby		
Provincial / State sides
Years	Team	Apps	(Points)
- Souths
Super Rugby
Years	Team	Apps	(Points)
- Queensland Reds
–	New South Wales Waratahs		
International career
Years	Team	Apps	(Points)
1989–2000	Australia	75	(102)
–	Australian Schoolboys		

Jason Little (born 26 August 1970) is an Australian former professional rugby union player. He won 75 caps with one as captain playing at centre for the Australian rugby union side between 1989 and 2000. He also won caps on the wing later in his career. He would later become one of only 43 players who have won the Rugby World Cup on multiple occasions, however as an Australian achieved this feat first.

== Early life ==
Little was born in Dalby, Queensland and attended Toowoomba Grammar School.

== International career ==
He made his test debut at the age of 19 against France 4 November 1989 on the Australian tour to Europe that year and shortly afterwards, he and Tim Horan were subjected to a mock ceremony where they pledged their futures to Rugby Union, promising not to defect to League. Both were to receive numerous offers from league clubs but turned them down. In three quarters of his caps he partnered Horan, who was also his partner at Souths Rugby in Brisbane in the late 1980s and then for Queensland Reds. His nickname was 'Sidney'.

Together he and Horan composed a centre partnership for Australia which came to the fore during the Rugby World Cup 1991 (won by Australia) and were widely regarded as the best centres in the world through the early 1990s, adding the Bledisloe Cup to their collection in 1992.

In the second Test of the tour against South Africa in 1993, he threw an interception pass which allowed Joel Stransky to run the length of the field and score under the posts. Australia had lost the first Test and the Boks were well up on the score sheet as a result of this and he was later to remark that his immediate reaction was that his career was over. He did however score a try in each half of the game and the Wallabies won the match and eventually the series.

By the year 1999, he was no longer an automatic choice for the Test side and made many appearances as a replacement as Daniel Herbert competed with him to partner Horan in the centres. He later moved south to New South Wales Waratahs in 2000 to resurrect his international career, a move which kept him in the test squad and earning him a place and a second winners medal at the Rugby World Cup 1999.

His final cap was a victory against South Africa on 26 August 2000 which was won 19–18 in dramatic style.

After retiring from International Rugby, he played briefly in England, firstly for Gloucester Rugby, then for a season as captain of West Country rivals Bristol Rugby, leading them to their first Twickenham appearance for 14 years, before retiring altogether from top-flight rugby.

== Post-playing career ==
Having retired, he undertook a course in Land Management at the Royal Agricultural College, Cirencester. He now lives on the North Shore, in Sydney with his wife Brigitte and three children.

Preceded by David Wilson	Australian national rugby union captain 1999	Succeeded by George Gregan
