= David Wilson (rugby union, born 1967) =

Australia international rugby union player

David John Wilson
- Born: David John Wilson; 4 January 1967 (age 59) Brisbane, Australia
- Occupation(s): Professional rugby union footballer, after dinner speaker

Rugby union career
- Position: Openside flanker
- Correct as of 7 August 2006
Super Rugby
Years	Team	Apps	(Points)
- Queensland Reds
International career
Years	Team	Apps	(Points)
1992-2000	Australia	79	(65)
- Correct as of 7 August 2006

David John Wilson (born 4 January 1967) is a former Australian rugby union footballer who played on the openside flank 79 times, and who captained the Wallabies 9 times.

Through his career he won every international trophy available to an Australian test player (Bledisloe Cup series wins in 1992, 94, 98, 99 & 2000 including the 1999 win as Captain), a world cup in 1999 & finally a Tri Nations series win in 2000.

== Early life ==
Wilson was born in Brisbane, Australia where he attended Ipswich Grammar School. He first came to prominence in 1985 when he was selected in the 1985 all conquering Australian Schoolboys team as Vice Captain.

== Career ==
Wilson made his grade debut for Easts Tigers (Brisbane) in 1987. After making his debut for Queensland in 1989, David was selected later the same year to tour with the Wallabies to Canada and France but it was not until 1992 when he made his debut with the Wallaby side in the home test against Scotland and was a regular starter in the national side from then on, when fit.

David was a member of the Wallabies from 1998 to 2000, a period during which the team won all available titles.

The 1999 World Cup win was followed up by Australia's first ever tri nations series win in 2000, following which he retired from test rugby. David moved to the UK to play for NEC Harlequins in the Zurich Premiership. A serious knee injury in the 2001 European Shield Final (Harlequins won the game 42–33 in extra time) ended Wilson's playing career at the age of 35 and he was forced to retire from the game.

Preceded by Tim Horan	Australian national rugby union captain 1997-1999	Succeeded by Jason Little
