= Brett Robinson (rugby union) =

Australian rugby player and administrator (born 1970)

Chair of World Rugby
- Incumbent
- Assumed office 14 November 2024
- Deputy: Jonathan Webb
- Preceded by: Bill Beaumont
- Born: Brett John Robinson; 24 January 1970 (age 56) Toowoomba, Australia
- Height: 6 ft 2 in (1.88 m)
- Weight: 222 lb (101 kg; 15 st 12 lb)

Rugby union career
- Position: Flanker
Amateur team(s)
Years	Team	Apps	(Points)
- Oxford University RFC
Super Rugby
Years	Team	Apps	(Points)
- Brumbies
International career
Years	Team	Apps	(Points)
1996-1998	Australia	16	(5)

Brett Robinson (born 24 January 1970) is an Australian rugby union administrator and a former player for the Australia national team, the Wallabies.

He was elected Chair of World Rugby in November 2024, becoming the first person from the Southern Hemisphere to hold that position.

Robinson was captain of the ACT Brumbies team in the Super 12 competition and played 16 Test matches for Australia.

He attended Downlands College in Toowoomba.
