= 1992 Australia rugby union tour of Europe =

Rugby tour

Summary
| P | W | D | L |
Total
| 13 | 10 | 0 | 3 |
Test match
| 2 | 2 | 0 | 0 |
Opponent
| P | W | D | L |
Ireland
| 1 | 1 | 0 | 0 |
Wales
| 1 | 1 | 0 | 0 |

The 1992 Australia rugby union tour of Europe, also known as the 1992 Wallabies Spring tour, was a series of matches played in Ireland, Wales and England in October and November 1992 by the Australia national rugby union team.

== Results ==
Scores and results list Australia's points tally first.

| Opposing Team | For | Against | Date | Venue | Status |
|---|---|---|---|---|---|
| Leinster | 38 | 11 | 17 October 1992 | Lansdowne Road, Dublin | Tour match |
| Munster | 19 | 22 | 21 October 1992 | Musgrave Park, Cork | Tour match |
| Ulster | 35 | 11 | 24 October 1992 | Ravenhill, Belfast | Tour match |
| Connacht | 14 | 6 | 27 October 1992 | Sportsgrounds, Galway | Tour match |
| Ireland | 42 | 17 | 31 October 1992 | Lansdowne Road, Dublin | Test match |
| Swansea | 6 | 21 | 4 November 1992 | St. Helen's, Swansea | Tour match |
| Wales B | 24 | 11 | 7 November 1992 | Arms Park, Cardiff | Tour match |
| Neath | 16 | 8 | 11 November 1992 | The Gnoll, Neath | Tour match |
| Llanelli | 9 | 13 | 14 November 1992 | Stradey Park, Llanelli | Tour match |
| Monmouthshire | 19 | 9 | 17 November 1992 | Eugene Cross Park, Ebbw Vale | Tour match |
| Wales | 23 | 6 | 21 November 1992 | Arms Park, Cardiff | Test match |
| Welsh Students | 37 | 6 | 24 November 1992 | Brewery Field, Bridgend | Tour match |
| Barbarians | 30 | 20 | 28 November 1992 | Twickenham, London | Tour match |
