= Australia national Australian rules football team =

Australia
- Nickname(s): AFL Academy, All-Australian Team
- Governing body: AFL Commission

Rankings
- Current: 1st (as of October 2022)

International Cup
- Appearances: 0 (does not compete)

Australia has named a senior Australian rules football team, known as the All-Australian team since 1947. This team, however has never officially played an international Australian rules football match. This is primarily because the sport is played professionally in Australia.

It has previously sent teams to play against Ireland's amateur Gaelic Athletic Association in the hybrid code of International Rules Football as the Australia international rules football team (this article is not about that team).

While the All-Australian team does not compete, the AFL National Academy (known simply as the "AFL Academy") is a national team composed of underage (under-19) players. In the past it has played annual matches against New Zealand, though currently it competes only against semi-professional state league teams. History has shown that more than two thirds of Academy players go on to professional careers at senior level in the Australian Football League.

Australia also has a history of fielding Australian Football sides both officially and unofficially recognised to compete at amateur and junior levels tours against national sides from other countries including New Zealand, South Africa, Papua New Guinea, the United States, as well as a combined side representing all of Europe. In addition, sides representing Indigenous Australia have competed internationally, including the Indigenous All-Stars against Papua New Guinea and the Flying Boomerangs.

High-profile representatives include AFL Brownlow medallists Chris Judd, Patrick Dangerfield, Adam Cooney, several AFL club captains including Luke Hodge, Travis Boak, Trent Cotchin, Jack Viney, Jarryd Roughead, Shannon Hurn, Jarrad McVeigh, Marc Murphy, Joel Selwood, Steven May, Jack Ziebell, other AFL greats including Cyril Rioli, Brett Deledio and numerous All-Australian players.

Australia remains undefeated, although Papua New Guinea came within two goals of a historic win at Football Park in 1978 and New Zealand within a goal at Wellington Stadium in 2014.

== History ==
Early in the spread of football codes across the globe, international tours and tests played a pivotal role. However, from the sport's early days, although plans were tabled for tours to England, various leagues had lacked the resources and organisation to send tours overseas. H C A Harrison "Father of Australian Football" was a supporter of the idea of international matches against England and New Zealand, and in London in 1884, pitched playing under compromise rules, however the idea was rejected. The idea was made more difficult as prior to the Federation of Australia the Australian colonies could still not reach a consensus on the idea of fielding a national side.

Some teams did however tour and played matches in Australia against Australian sides, notably in 1888 and 1889, the British & Irish Lions and New Zealand Native team played matches against clubs in Australia but no recognised international tests. These tours were conditional on Australian leagues playing some matches under rugby rules to keep the competition fair. Generally games were won by the teams playing their own code and this led to the perception that the codes were by now too dissimilar for such matches to continue. Unlike the football codes with less players sending squads of 18 to 22 players on international tours would prove to be an expensive exercise and sharing the costs across multiple colonies would prove much more difficult than, for example, New South Wales sending a national rugby team.

=== Australasian Football Council rejects international matches ===
It wasn't until the formation of the national body, the Australasian Football Council in 1906 that the opportunity presented itself for funding and organisation for a national team. However representatives of the two strongest leagues, the Victorian Football League and South Australian Football League, in an effort to protect their primacy in Australia, lobbied the council to form a strict policy discouraging the game from being played overseas. Through the council they allocated all funds to interstate representation, and none to international representation. The policy was boosted by a wave of post-Federation Australian nationalism. In 1906 the council's official policy became "one flag, one destiny, one football game" and chose to play all matches under an Australian flag, on Australian turf with an Australian manufactured ball. The first request for international tour came in 1906 from Australian rules football in South Africa, the AFC therefore replied that if it wanted to play against Australia, it would have to send a team to Australia. This was to become the council's default stance. New Zealand had only one representative on the council, and faced opposition from most of the Australian colonies. Though it was given permission to send a side to the 1908 Melbourne Carnival (which defeated Queensland and New South Wales) the AFC never fielded a national team against them. Subsequent calls from overseas for Australia to send teams to the United States (1909), New Zealand (1910), Japan (1910) and Canada (1912) were all rejected by the AFC.

=== West Australian Football League supports unsanctioned tours ===
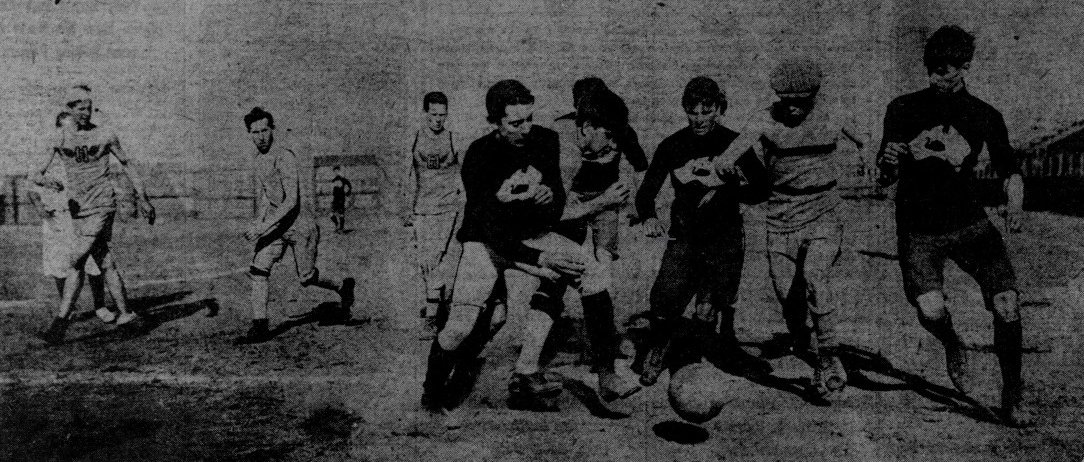
USA schoolboys vs Young Australia. Presidio of San Francisco. 1 October 1911. These unofficial internationals were supported by Western Australia but not sanctioned by the Australasian Football Council.

Western Australia through the West Australian Football League and its junior Young Australia League organised unsanctioned tours of the US by Australian junior representative teams between 1911 and 1919 reciprocating young American tours of Australia from 1909, resulting in the first international match between the two countries in 1911 (though the teams were composed mostly of West Australians) and helping establish Australian rules football in the United States. For a country with less than a thousand players, USA's junior athletes proved highly competitive against the Australian sides. In 1912, Canada sent a junior touring side to Australia, however the tour was not recognised by the AFC and as such no composite Australian representative side was fielded against them. With the rapid growth in the United States, the AFC's delegate from Western Australia strongly argued for sanctioned tours to both the United States and Canada, however the governing body elected not to. The result was that most competitions outside Australia went into permanent recess by the end of the 1920s. In contrast, the top leagues in Australia were going professional and a widening gap in interstate representative matches would make it almost impossible for other countries to compete.

=== Australian Football World Tour and International Rules ===
In the 1960s, the focus would shift. A promotional tour, known as the Australian Football World Tour, took place in 1967, with matches played in Ireland, the United Kingdom, and the United States, though without any local players no international matches of Australian rules were played. This resulted in the first International Rules matches played between Australia and a touring County Meath Gaelic football team, Meath being the reigning All-Ireland senior football champions. The national side was known as the "Galahs". Ireland would maintain the VFL's primary international focus (especially given its ongoing Irish Experiment recruiting initiative) through to the 21st century. Though it was not officially endorsed by the AFC, support for the idea was continued by the VFL/AFL and later Australian Amateur Football Council.

=== 1970s: First international matches ===
In the 1960s and 1970s, Australian rules was unexpectedly booming in the Pacific in Papua New Guinea and Nauru. While Nauru had been soundly defeated by PNG it was considered far too small a nation to field a competitive side against Australia. Papua New Guinea however with tens of thousands of players to draw from, had a fast moving and hard hitting side that was competitive against some of the VFL's strongest clubs, and was extremely determined to compete against Australia. In 1977 a Victorian U17 team travelled to Port Moresby and were almost defeated. PNG persevered and in 1978 sent a team to Adelaide, and in a historic match came close to beating Australia. However the Australian National Football Council withdrew its promise to admit PNG as a voting member, along with senior funding and plans to tour Papua New Guinea and the local competitions soon collapsed. This was in part due to the country's national sporting body withdrawing funding due to a lack of international competition. In turn this also left Australia with no opponent.

=== International Cup and IAFC ===
When the International Australian Football Council was formed in 1995 one of its aims was to 'establish and promote an official World Cup of Australian Football'. The initial proposal was for similar eligibility criteria to other football codes which would mean that it could draw the significant pool of Australians born overseas or with a parent or grandparent from the country they chose to represent. This would in turn reduce the logistical and financial burden on overseas clubs who would send their best players to top up the squads. At the time it was thought that 2008, being the 150th anniversary of the game, was the appropriate date. The idea of Australia eventually entering an amateur side was first proposed. In 1999 a proposal was received from the New Zealand Australian Football League (NZAFL), suggesting that the World Cup be brought forward to 2002.

An approach was then made to the national body, the AFL, asking for their support in staging the event. The AFL agreed on the basis that the event was renamed the "International Cup", that an Australian side would not compete and that there be strict eligibility criteria to exclude Australian players. In 2004, the AFL formed its own International Policy, pushed for the dissolution of the IAFC to became formally recognised as the world governing body for the sport. It took the International Cup over and put it under its development arm. The idea of an Australian team, even a development or amateur one, participating in the tournament was dismissed.

=== AIS-AFL Academy and South Africa tours (2007–2010) ===
Australia did not compete internationally at any recognised level until the AFL Commission in 1998 formed a 10-year partnership with the Australian Sports Commission (ASC) and the Australian Institute of Sport (AIS), the AIS-AFL Academy, with national sports funding. The AFL Commission had been working towards Australian Institute of Sport recognition as early as 1982, which was made more difficult by not having significant matches played in Canberra or international competition, however the commission believed that expanding into a national competition was the best way to gain national recognition. The AIS junior development funding was contingent on international competition, which the AFL was able to satisfy through a junior International Rules Series against Ireland. The AIS funded scholarships to 30 17 year old players for a year based on their football performance as a 16 year old, their positive attitude to education and schooling and potential to play at professional AFL level. However, with the GAA cancelling both the senior and junior series in 2006, the AFL had to find another opponent in order to continue to receive national sports funding. which it sought to capitalise on burgeoning Australian investment in Australian rules football in South Africa. Following some highly unevenly matched contests, the gap between the two countries drew comments from AFL CEO Andrew Demetriou the South Africans would be better suited to playing a game with a round ball (referring to International Rules but possibly also soccer). In 2011, the program expanded to include two squads however the AFL abandoned the South African program and sent a side on tour to Europe to play against a combined side. The Australian Institute of Sport withdrew from the partnership in 2013 to focus on Olympics recognised sports. The National Australia Bank extended its Australian Football sponsorship to the AFL Academy to fill the gap left by the AIS.

=== AFL push into New Zealand and Europe (2012–2018) ===
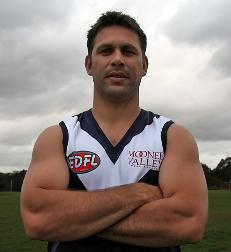
Triple AFL premiership player, All-Australian and AFL club captain Chris Johnson coached the side between 2012 and 2015

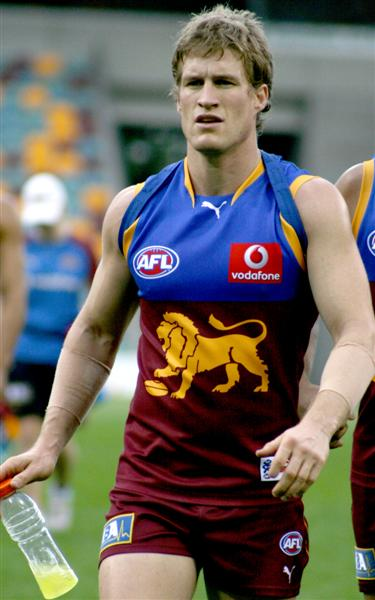
Triple AFL premiership player, All-Australian and AFL club captain Luke Power has coached the team since 2016

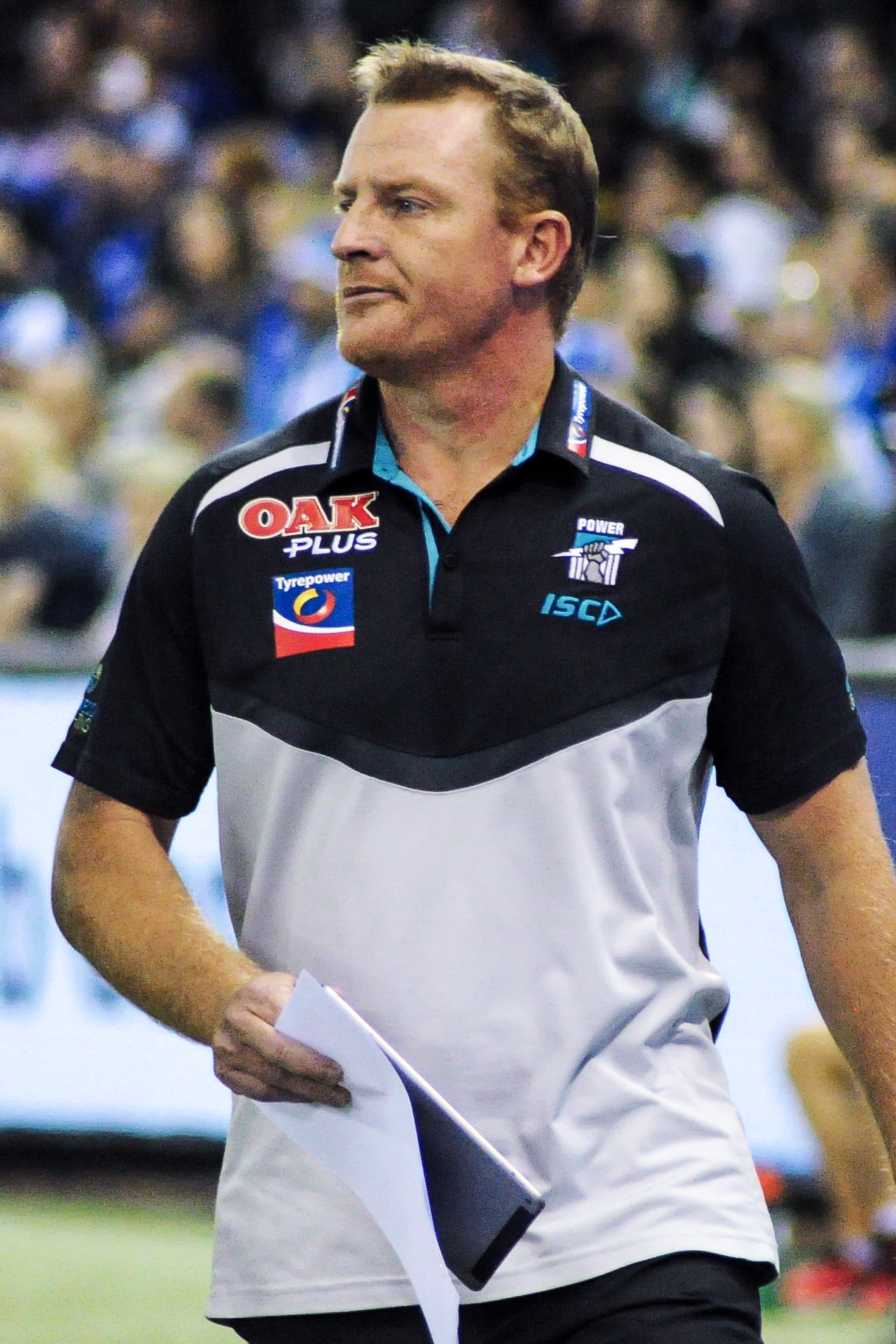
Brownlow medallist and triple AFL premiership player, All-Australian and AFL club captain coached the AFL Academy to its historic first victory against the South Africa

The AFL's partnership in New Zealand with Wellington Regional Stadium helped fill the gap left by the AIS and it began playing its development team against an open aged NZ sides in 2012. Competing as the AFL Academy (or Australia U17) an annual series of tours was established against New Zealand as part of a junior development pathway with AFL New Zealand. The AFL also sent tours to Europe in 2013 and 2014 to compete against a combined AFL Europe side known as the European Legion. The AFL also set up International Combines in Europe and New Zealand from which some of the athletes participated as the Academy's opposition.

New Zealand matches were later extended to include women's matches however COVID-19 pandemic put international matches on hold.

=== Academy national team disbanded (2018) ===
At the end of 2018, the AFL put an end to overseas tours for its AFL Academy, which meant that international sides would once again require to travel to Australia to compete. Unable to secure nationals sports funding the AFL also restructured the AFL Academy into state-based academies, diverting funding intended for overseas tours into academies featuring its clubs in developing states of New South Wales and Queensland.

=== Academy team matches against state league teams (2019–present) ===
Since 2019 the state-based academies have formed the basis of the AFL National Academy teams for boys and girls, made up of primarily players in the under-18 age bracket. The boys team have played once-a-year fixtures against teams from the Victorian Football League and South Australian National Football League, while the girls have competed against combined under-23 state teams. Both teams undertake regular training and high-development camps, as well as partake in yearly formal matches against opposition.

== International Representative Matches ==
Matches
| Year | Date | Opponent | Result | Stadium | Captain/s (vice-captain) | Coach | Best | Crowd | Notes/References |
|---|---|---|---|---|---|---|---|---|---|
| 2019 | 26 January | New Zealand | Australia U17 17.20 (122) def New Zealand 7.3 (45) | Marvel Stadium, Melbourne, Australia | Will Phillips (c), Elijah Hollands (vc) | Luke Power | Corey Durdin, Will Phillips, Elijah Hollands, Alex Davies, Nikolas Cox, Connor Downie, Braeden Campbell, Errol Gulden | | |
| 2018 | | New Zealand | New Zealand 6.6.(42) def. by Australia U17 21.21.(147) | Wellington Stadium, Wellington, New Zealand | Noah Anderson (c), Hayden Young (vc) Matt Rowell (vc) | Luke Power | Rhai Arn Cox, Noah Anderson, Matt Rowell, Hayden Young, Mitch O'Neill | | |
| 2017 | April 24 | New Zealand | New Zealand 5.9 (39) def. by Australia U17 21.19 (145) | Wellington Stadium, Wellington, New Zealand | | Luke Power | | | |
| 2016 | | New Zealand | New Zealand def. by Australia U17 | Outer oval, North Harbour Stadium, Auckland, New Zealand | | Luke Power | | | |
| 2015 | | New Zealand | New Zealand 3.3 (21) def. by Australia U17 16.1 (107) | Wellington Stadium, Wellington, New Zealand | | Chris Johnson | Will Brodie, Ben Ainsworth, Jordan Galluci, Matt Scharenberg, Sam Petrevski-Seton, Steven Slimming, Will Setterfield, Harrison Macreadie | 1,500 | |
| 2014 | 12 April | (European Union) European Legion (combined team) | European Legion 6.6 (42) def. by Australia U18 21.11 (137) | Harrow School, London | | Glen Jakovich | Tom Lamb, Lachlan Weller, Isaac Heeney, Hugh Goddard, Christian Petracca, Brad Walsh, Clem Smith | | |
| 2014 | 26 January | New Zealand | New Zealand 5.6 (36) def. by Australia U17 4.16 (40) | Wellington Stadium, Wellington, New Zealand | | Chris Johnson | Stephen Tahana, Jacob Weitering | | |
| 2013 | 7 April | (European Union) European Legion (combined team) | European Legion 3.0 (18) def. by Australia U18 15.14 (104) | Surrey Sports Park, Guildford | | Michael O'Loughlin | Matt Scharenberg, Ben Lennon, Dwayne Wilson, Josh Kelly, Errin Wasley-Black, Marcus Bontempelli, Luke Dunstan | | |
| 2013 | January | New Zealand | New Zealand 7.16 (58) def. by AFL-AIS Academy 16.5 (101) | Wellington Stadium, Wellington, New Zealand | | Chris Johnson | | | |
| 2012 | 12 April | (European Union) European Titans (combined team) | European Titans 1.4 (10) def. by AFL-AIS Academy 27.15 (177) | Polo Club du Domaine de Chantilly, Paris | | Brad Johnson | Jake Stringer, James Stewart, Jordon Bourke, Lachie Plowman, Emmanuel Irra, Lachie Whitfield, Nick Vlastuin, Jason Pongracic | | |
| 2012 | 8 April | (European Union) European Legion (combined team) | European Legion 2 goals def. by AFL-AIS Academy 22.14 (146) | Surrey Sports Park, Guildford | | Brad Johnson | Daniel Menzel, Nick Vlastuin, Lachie Plowman, Lachie Whitfield | | |
| 2012 | January | New Zealand | New Zealand 6.3 (39) def. by AFL-AIS Academy 19.16(130) | Wellington Stadium, Wellington, New Zealand | | Chris Johnson | Jack Billings, Luke McDonald, Billy Hartung, Jesse Hogan, James Aish, Ben Lennon, Luke Dunstan, Matt Scharenberg | | |
| 2010 | April | South Africa | South Africa 4.5 (29) def. by AFL-AIS Academy 26.22 (178) | Cape Town, South Africa | | Michael O'Loughlin | Tom Mitchell, Daniel Gorringe, Adam Treloar, Michael Bussey, Piers Flanagan, Sam Gordon, Chad Wingard, Jonathon Patton | | |
| 2009 | April | South Africa | South Africa 3.2 (20) def. by AFL-AIS Academy 23.14 (152) | Boland Park, Paarl, South Africa | | Alan McConnell | Jordan Gysberts, Shaun Atley, David Swallow, Scott Lycett, Rhys Mott, Steven May | | |
| 2008 | April | South Africa | South Africa 5.4 (34) def. by AFL-AIS Academy 19.18 (132) | Sedgars Park Stadium, Potchefstroom South Africa | | Jason McCartney | Tyson Davis-Neale, Jack Trengove, Michael Hurley, Anthony Morabito, Ayce Cordy, Kane Lucas | | |
| 2007 | 14 April | South Africa | South Africa 1.6 (12) def. by AFL-AIS Academy 23.24 (162) | Sedgars Park Stadium, Potchefstroom South Africa | | Michael Voss | Patrick Dangerfield, Trent Cotchin, Brad Ebert, Hamish Hartlett, Steven Gaertner, Jack Grimes, Addam Maric, Dylan Ross | | |
| 1978 | June 8 | Papua New Guinea U17 | Australia U17 12.13 (85) def Papua New Guinea 10.14 (74) | Football Park, Adelaide, Australia | | | | | Sanctioned by the Australian National Football Council as the first official international match involving Australia |
| 1911 | 24 September | United States (schoolboys) | United States (44) def. by Young Australia (95) | Lincoln Park, San Francisco, United States of America | | | | 5,000 | Unsanctioned match. Australian squad consisted of 40 West Australians + 1 South Australian + 1 Victorian |

== Other Matches ==
Matches
| Year | Date | Opponent | Result | Stadium | Captain/s (vice-captain) | Coach | Best | Crowd | Notes/References |
|---|---|---|---|---|---|---|---|---|---|
| 2021 | 24 April | Geelong Reserves | Australia U18 2.7 (19) def. by Geelong Reserves 22.17 (149) | GMHBA Stadium, Geelong, Australia | | Tarkyn Lockyer | Nick Daicos, Josh Fahey, Neil Erasmus, Mac Andrew, Josh Gibcus, Rhett Bazzo | | |

== Squads ==
=== 2019 (U17) ===
Taj Schofield; Nathan O'Driscoll; Brandon Walker; Zane Trew; Logan McDonald; Denver Grainger-Barras; Will Phillips; Connor Downie; Campbell Edwardes; Nikolas Cox; Tanner Bruhn; Oliver Henry; Elijah Hollands; Ethan Baxter; Jamarra Ugle-Hagan; Oliver Davis; Sam Collins; Jackson Callow; Corey Durdin; Zachary Dumesny; Jye Sinderberry; Luke Edwards; Kaine Baldwin; Riley Thilthorpe; Alex Davies; Errol Gulden; Braeden Campbell

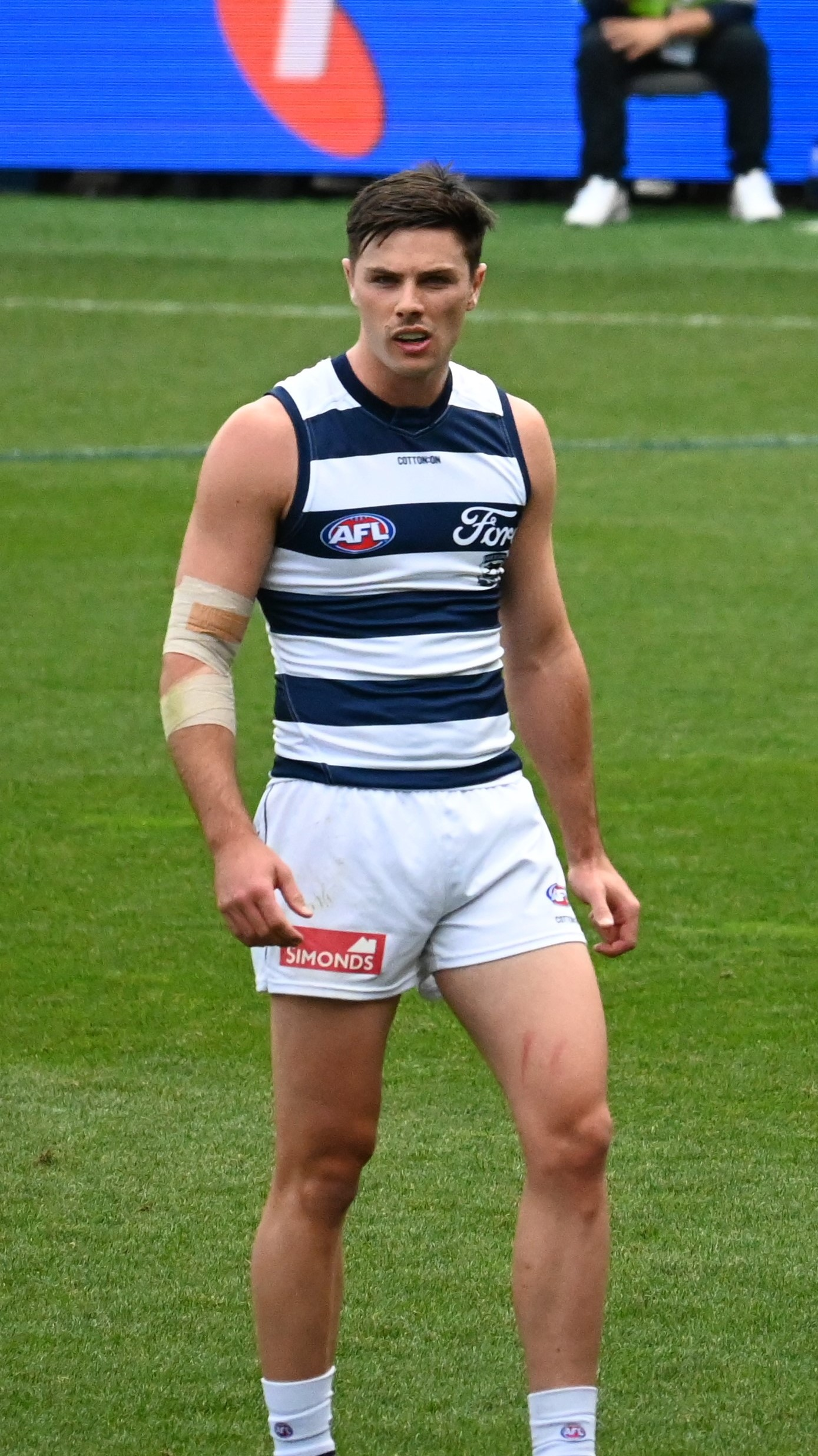
Oliver Henry in 2024

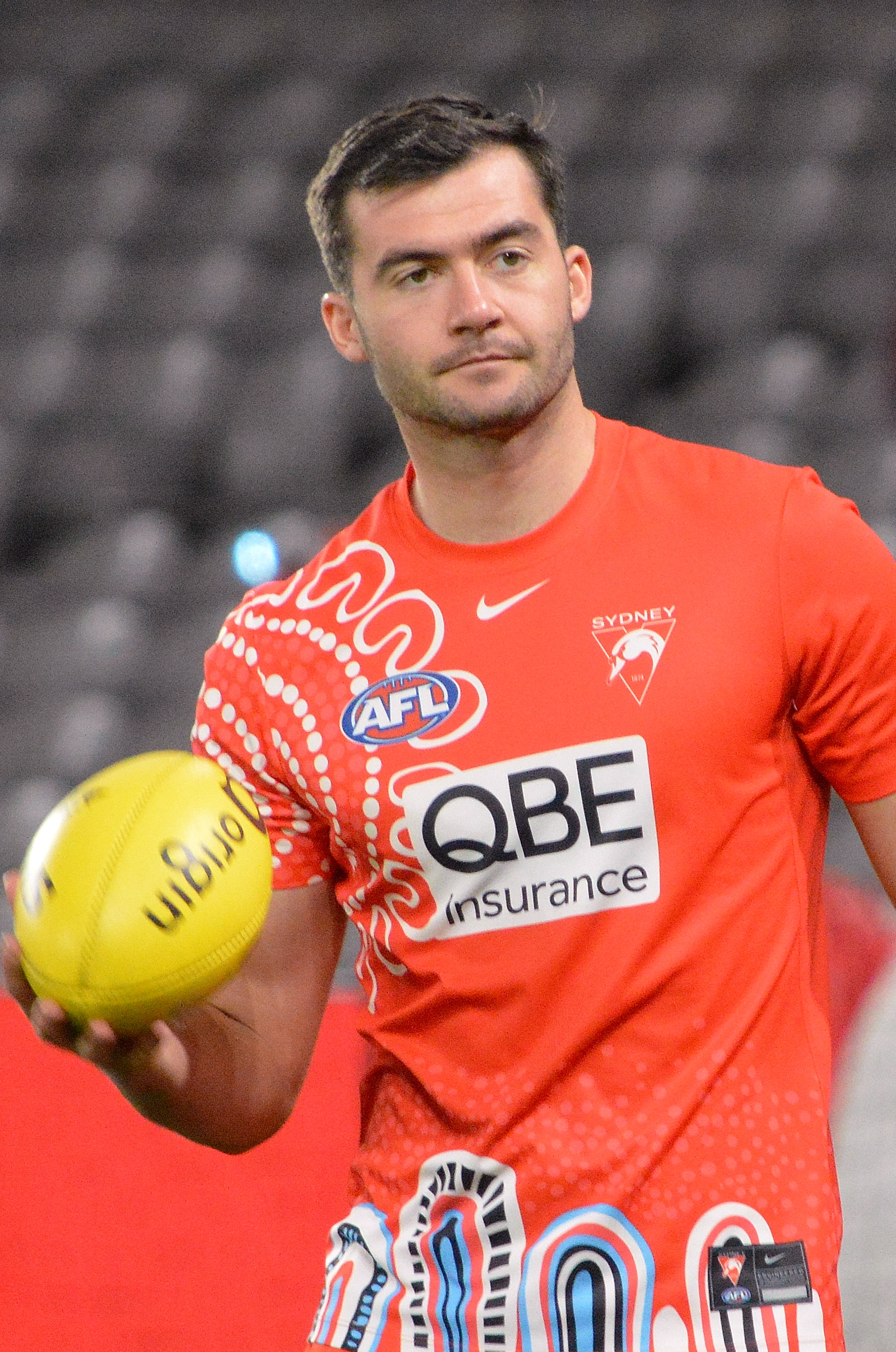
Logan McDonald in 2026

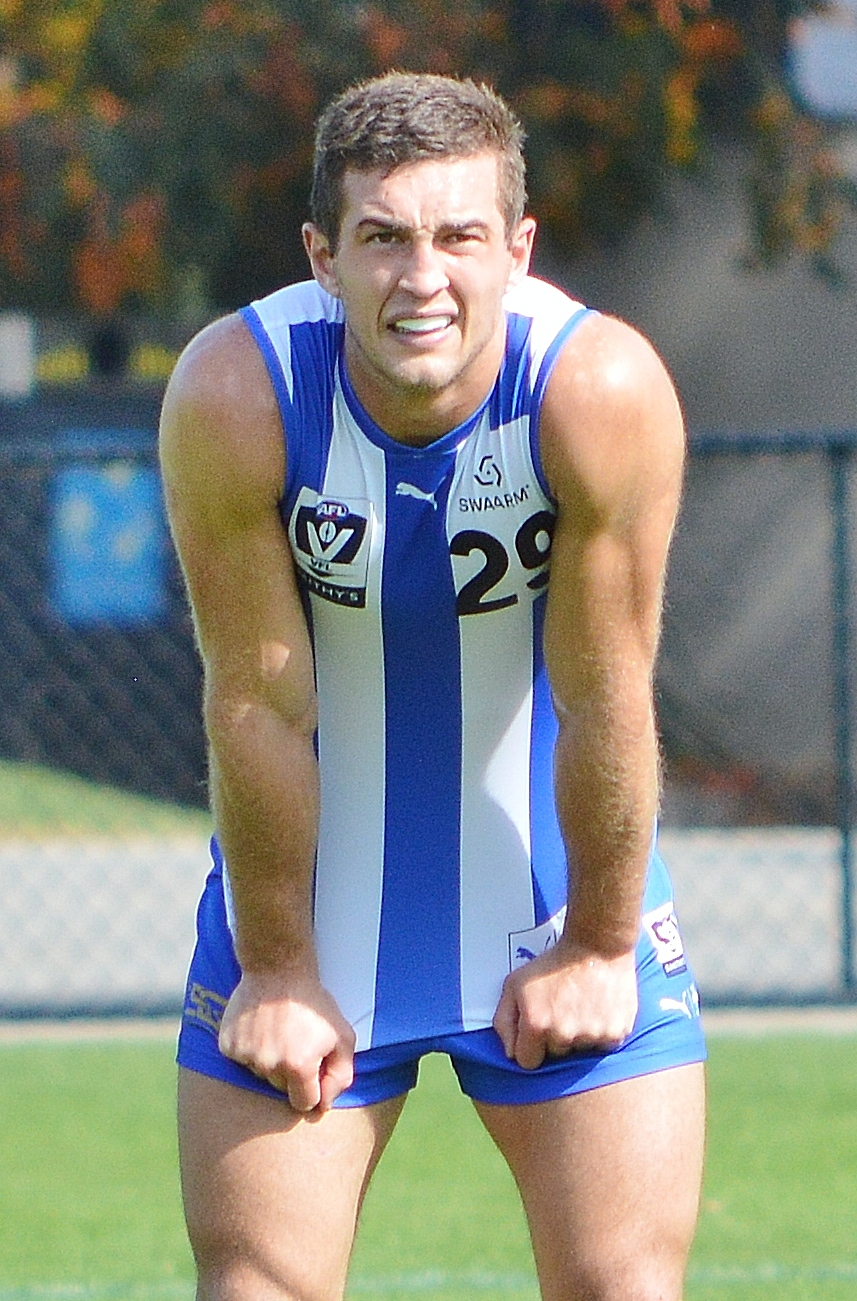
Will Phillips in 2025

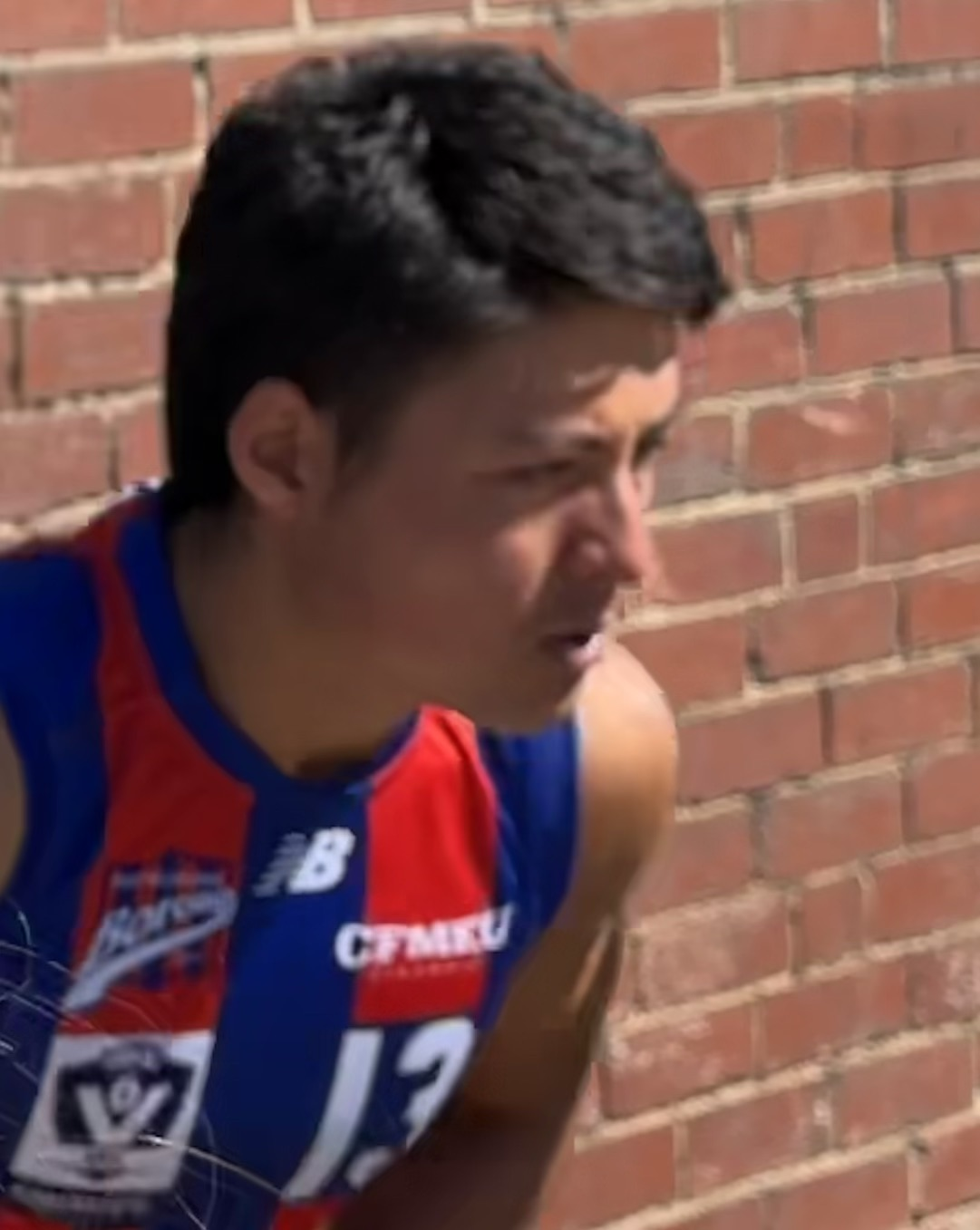
Connor Downie in 2026

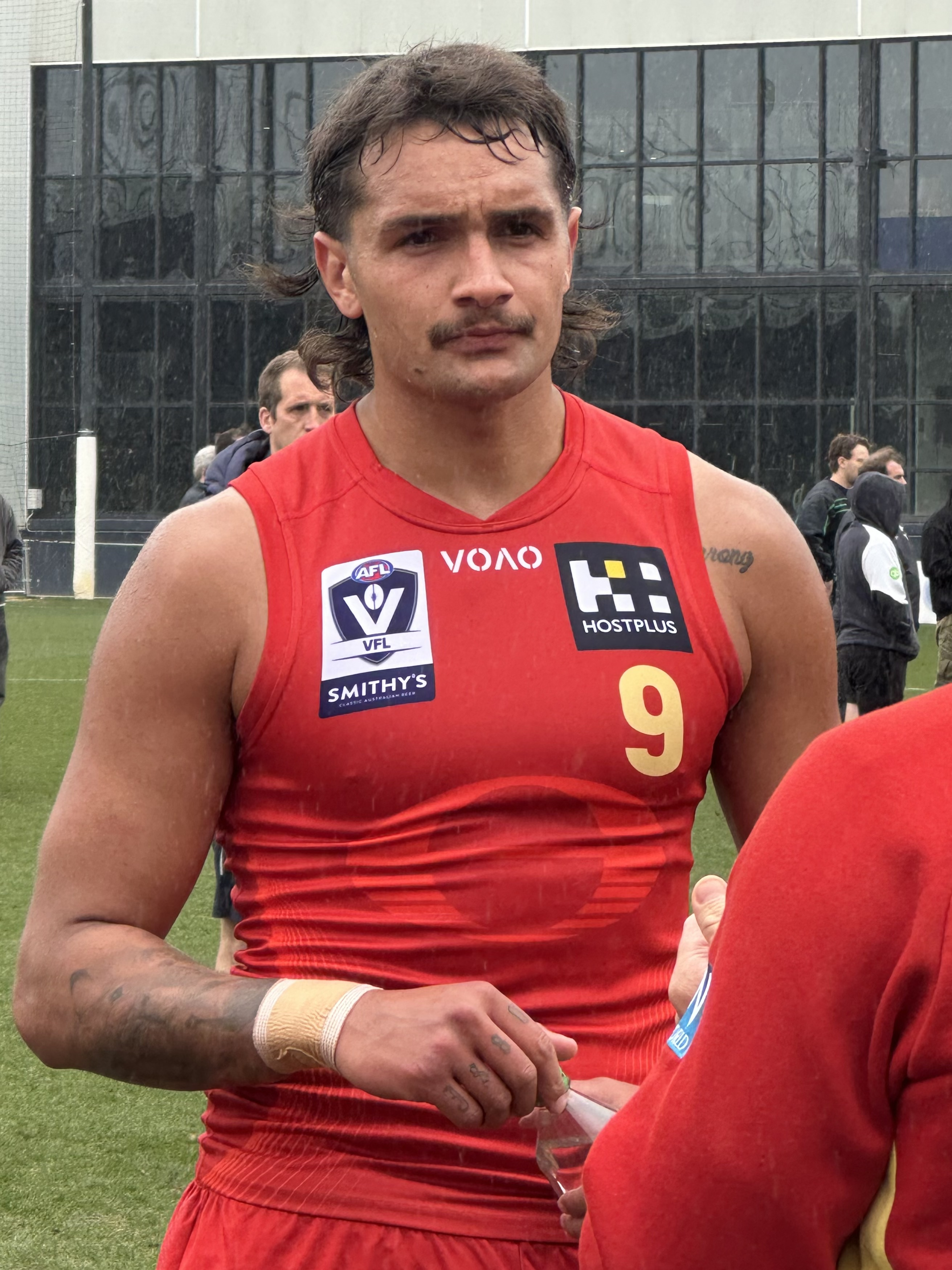
Jamarra Ugle-Hagan in 2026

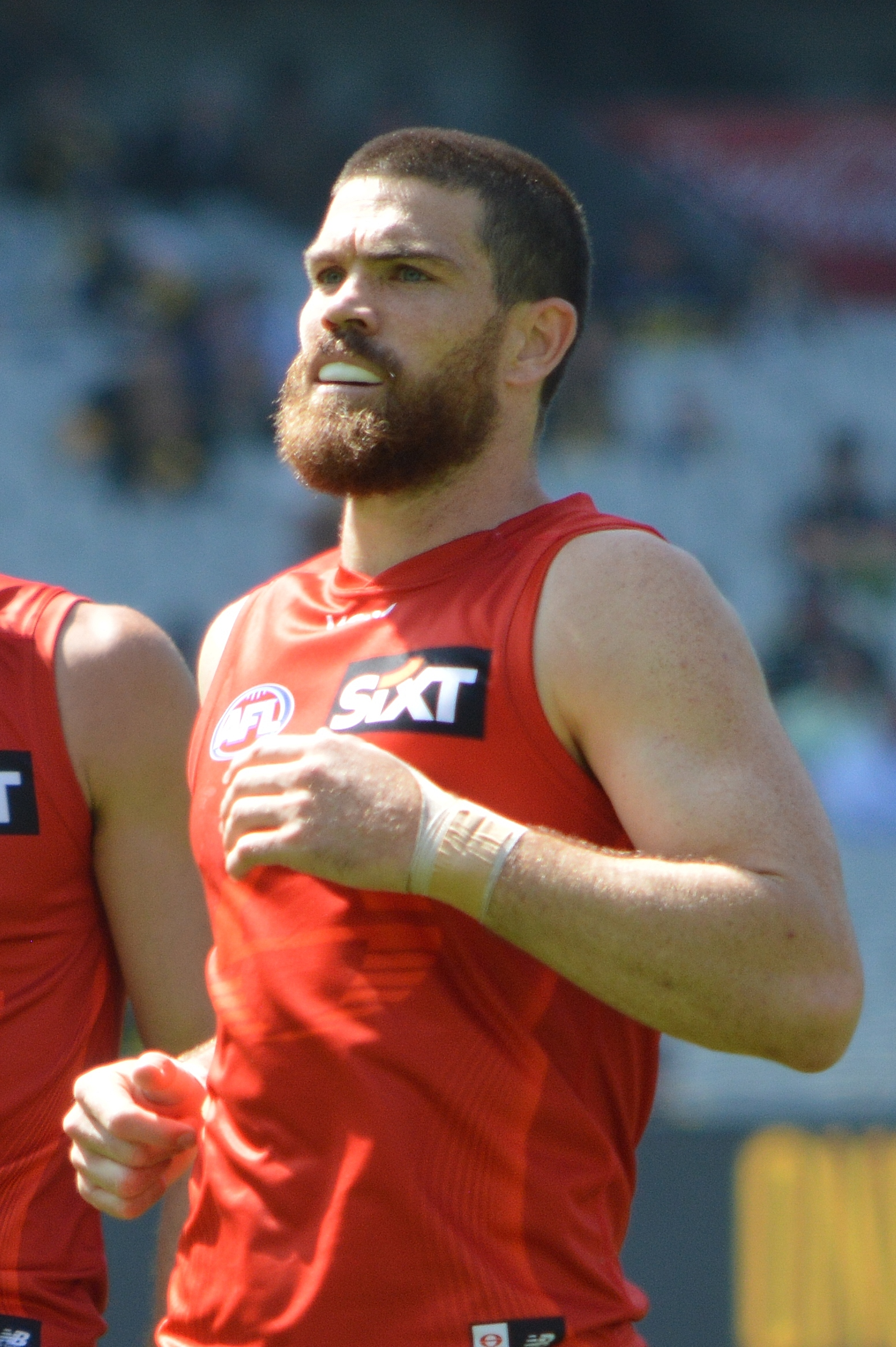
Sam Collins in 2026

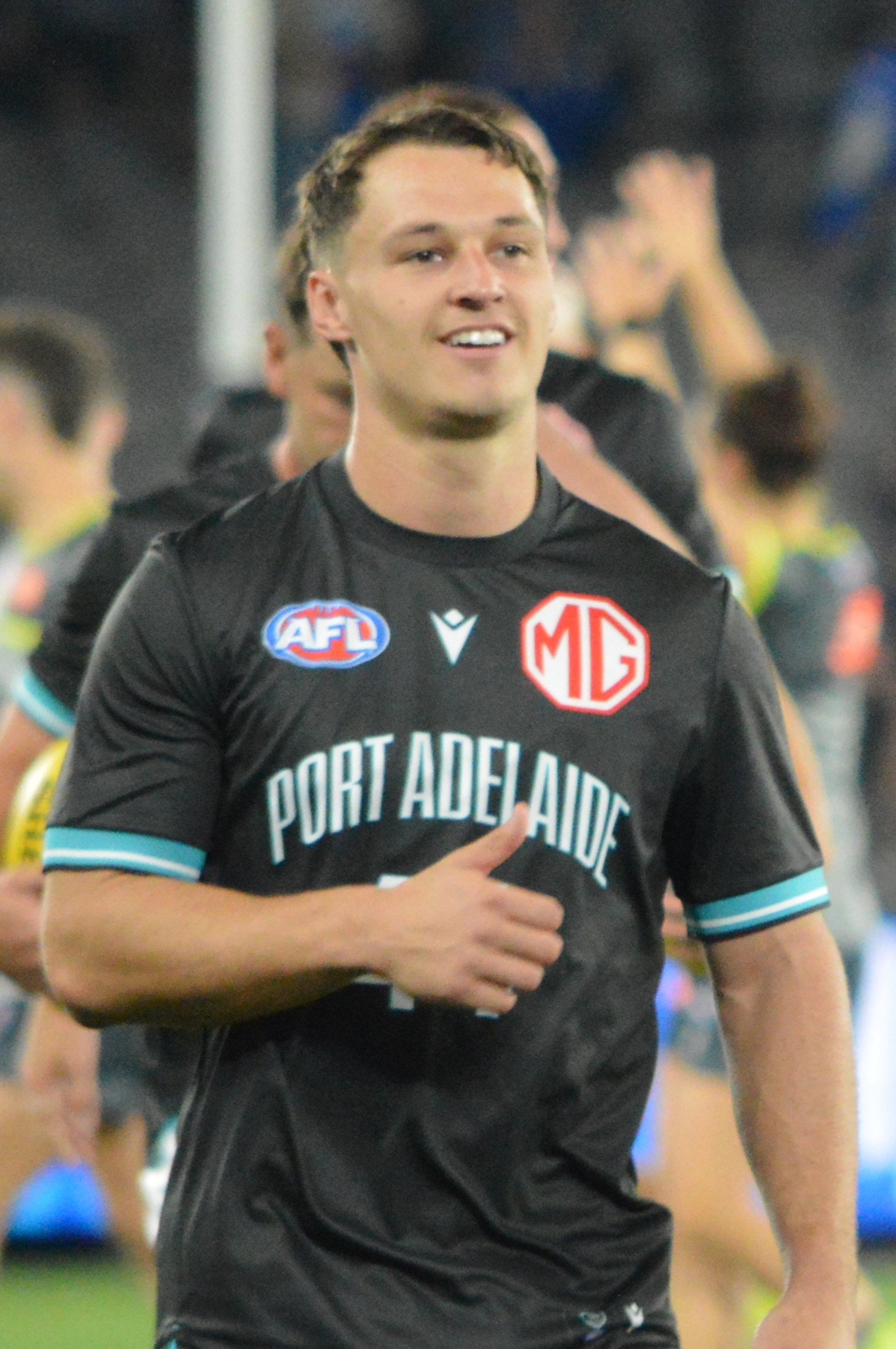
Corey Durdin in 2026

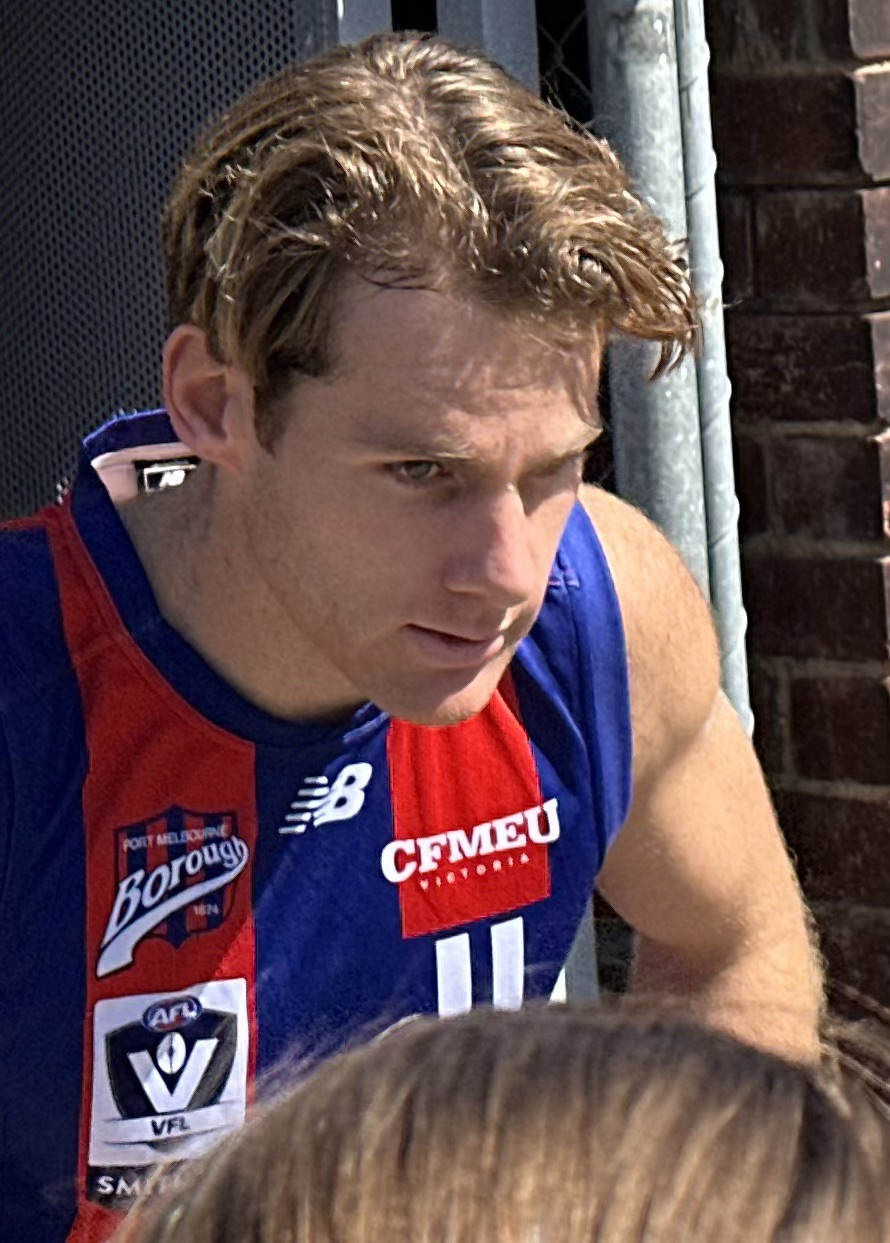
Kaine Baldwin in 2026

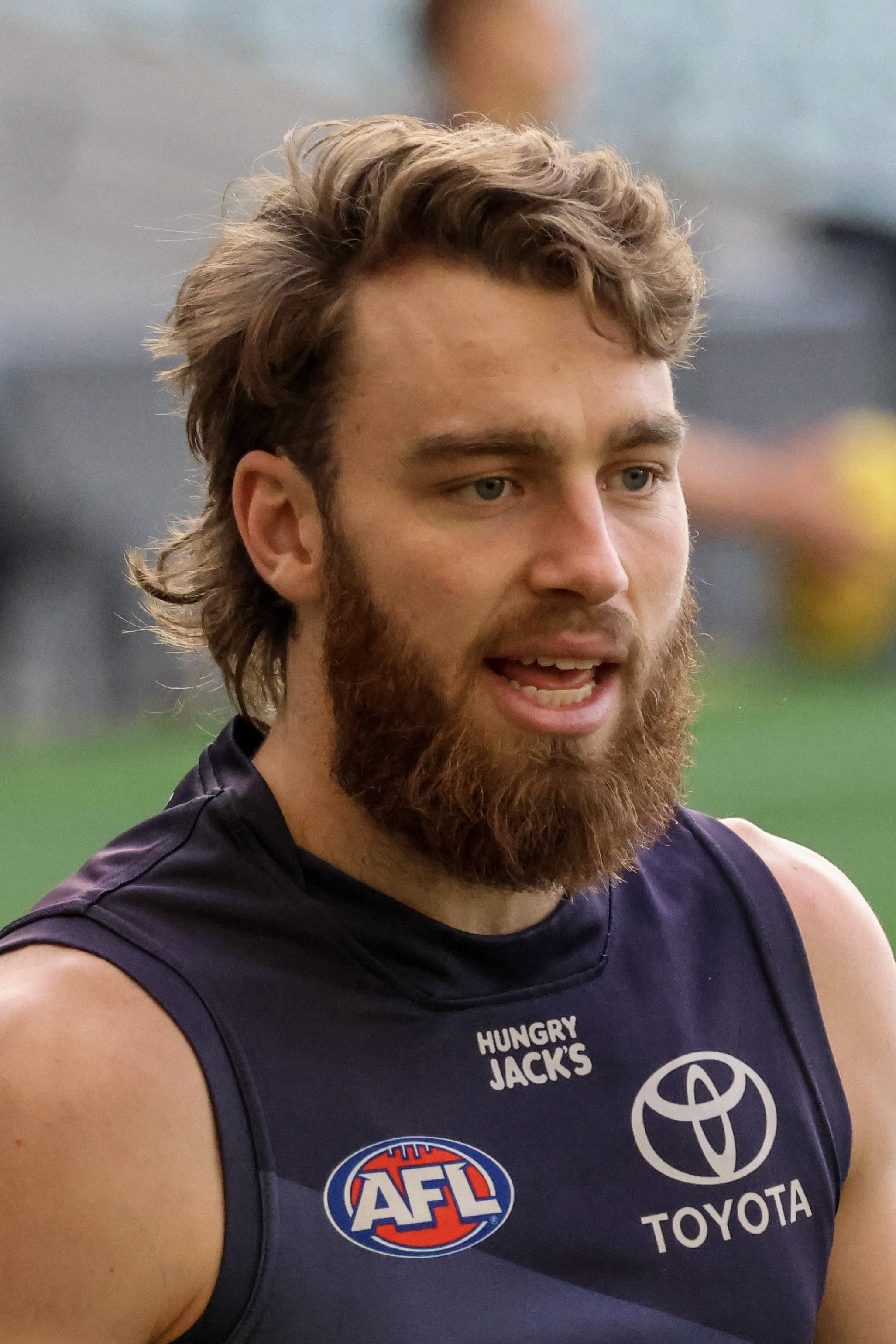
Riley Thilthorpe in 2026

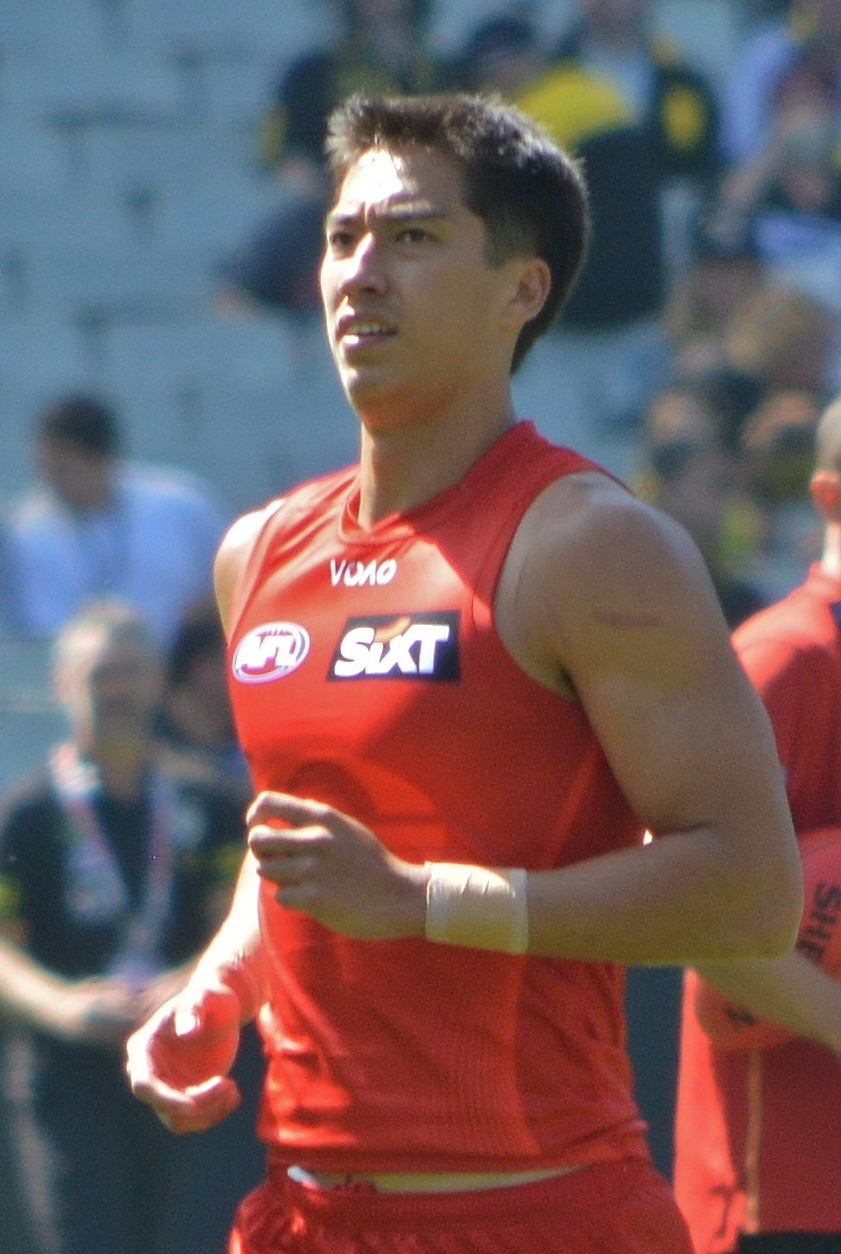
Alex Davies in 2026

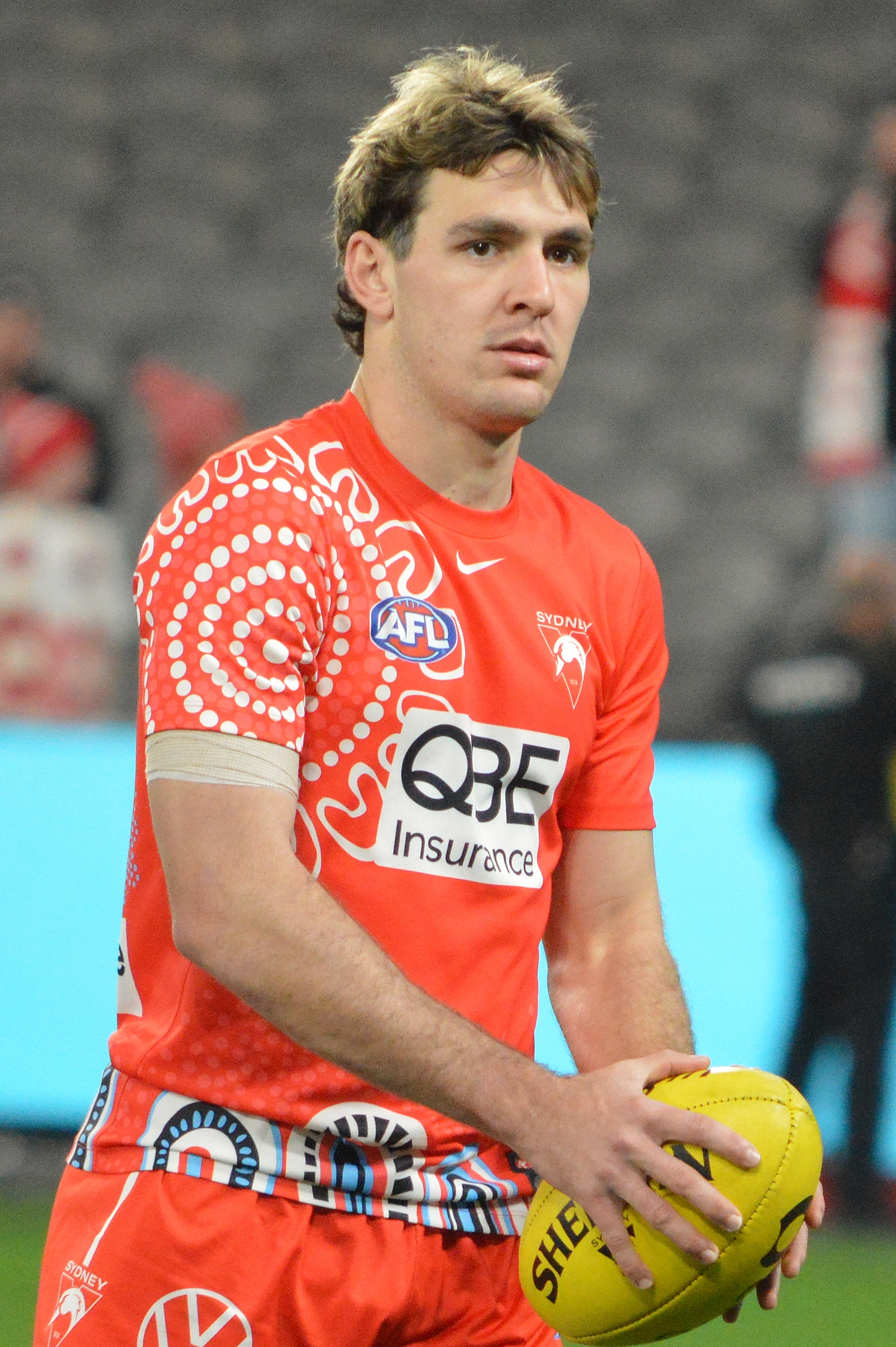
Errol Gulden in 2026

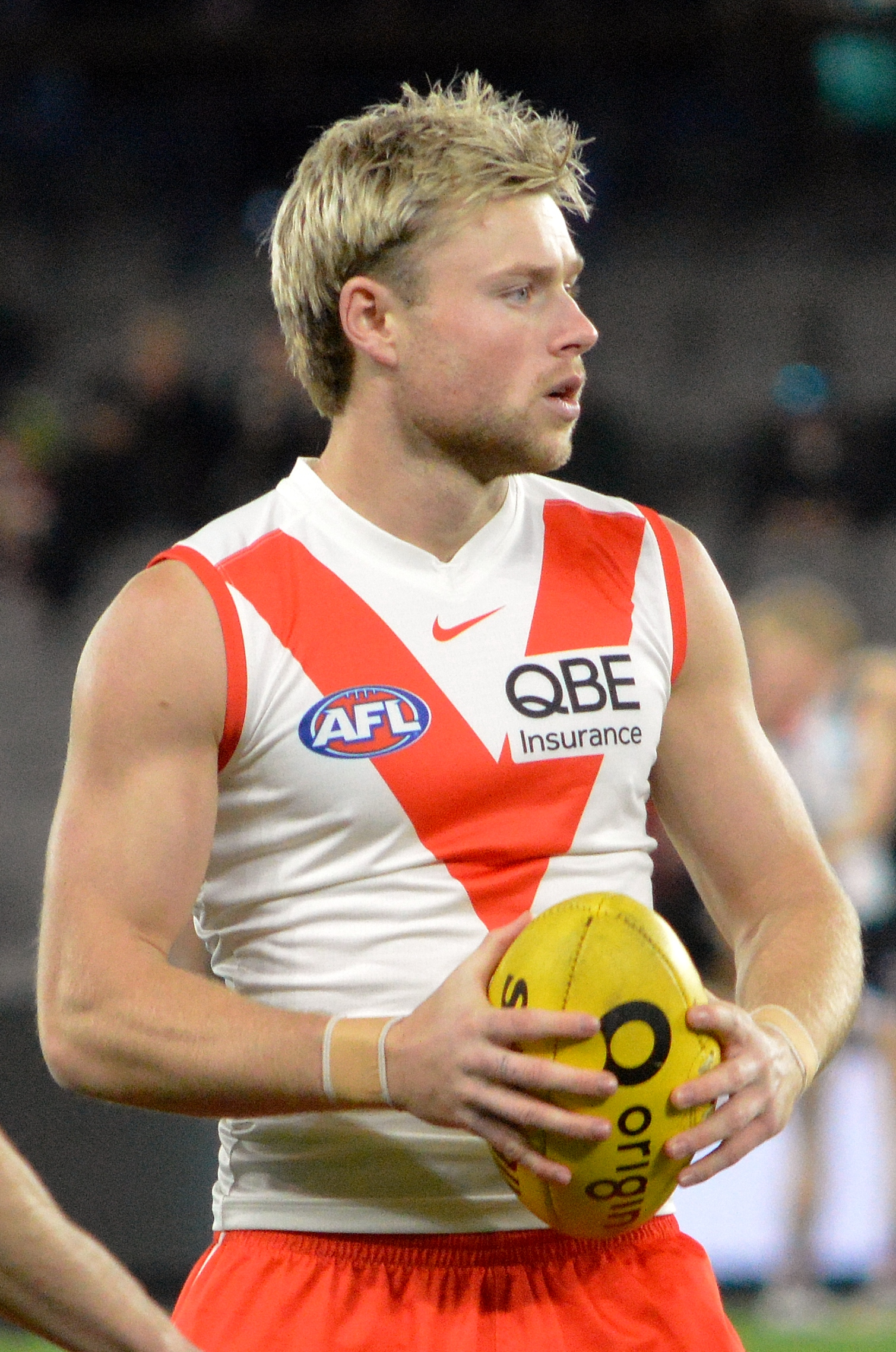
Braeden Campbell in 2026

=== 2018 (U17) ===
Kysaiah Pickett; Rhai Arn Cox; Connor Budarick; Caleb Serong; Jack Mohony; Matthew Rowell; Hewago Paul-Oea; Deven Robertson; Cameron Taheny; Dylan Stephens; Sam Flanders; Hayden Young; Dylan Williams; Cooper Stephens; Noah Anderson; Joshua Rayner; Jamieson Rossiter; Brodie Kemp; Liam Delahunty; Fischer McAsey; Emerson Jeka; Mitch O'Neill; Anthony Davis; Jack Buller; Andrew Courtney

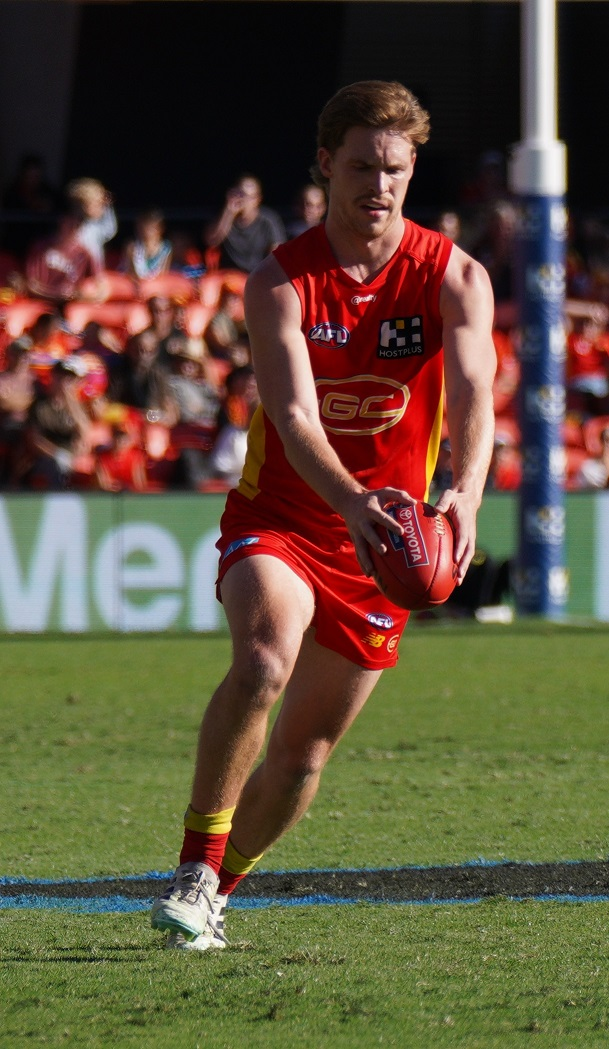
Captain Noah Anderson in 2021

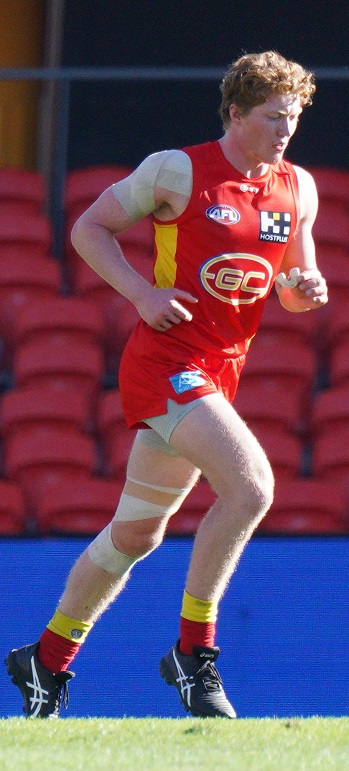
Vice-captain Matt Rowell in 2021

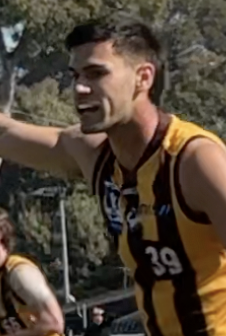
Emerson Jeka in 2023

=== 2017 (U17) ===
Ruben Flinn, Jackson Hately, Jack Lukosius, Hugo Munn, Izak Rankine, Connor Rozee, Luke Valente, Jack Bytel, Max King, Ben King, Rhylee West, Buku Khamis, Zane Barzen, Jye Caldwell, Sam Fletcher, Hudson Garoni, Sam Walsh, Ajak Dang, Jason Carter, Ian Hill, Tom Joyce, Sydney Stack, Chayce Jones, Tarryn Thomas, Nick Blakey, Matthew Walker, Bailey Scott, Michael Mummery

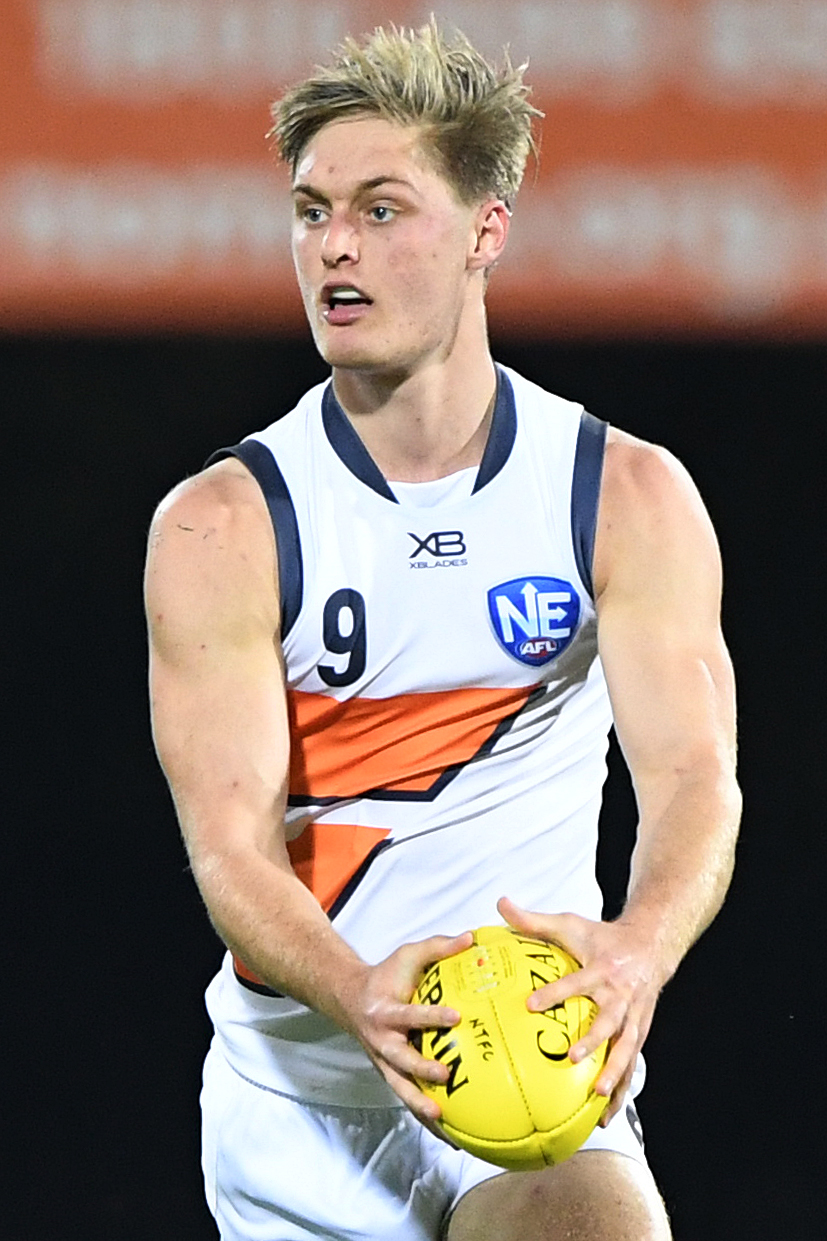
Jackson Hately in 2019

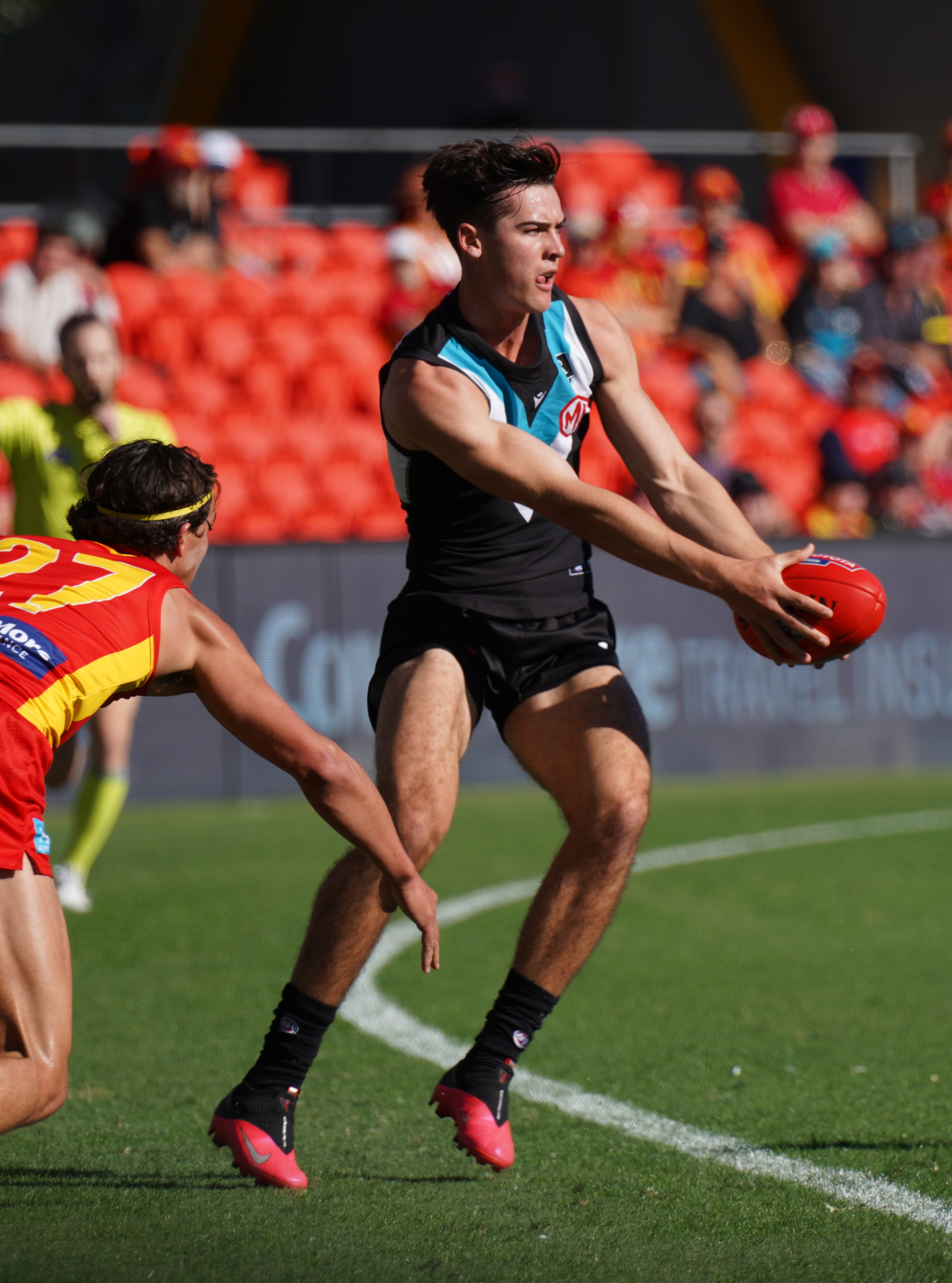
Connor Rozee in 2021

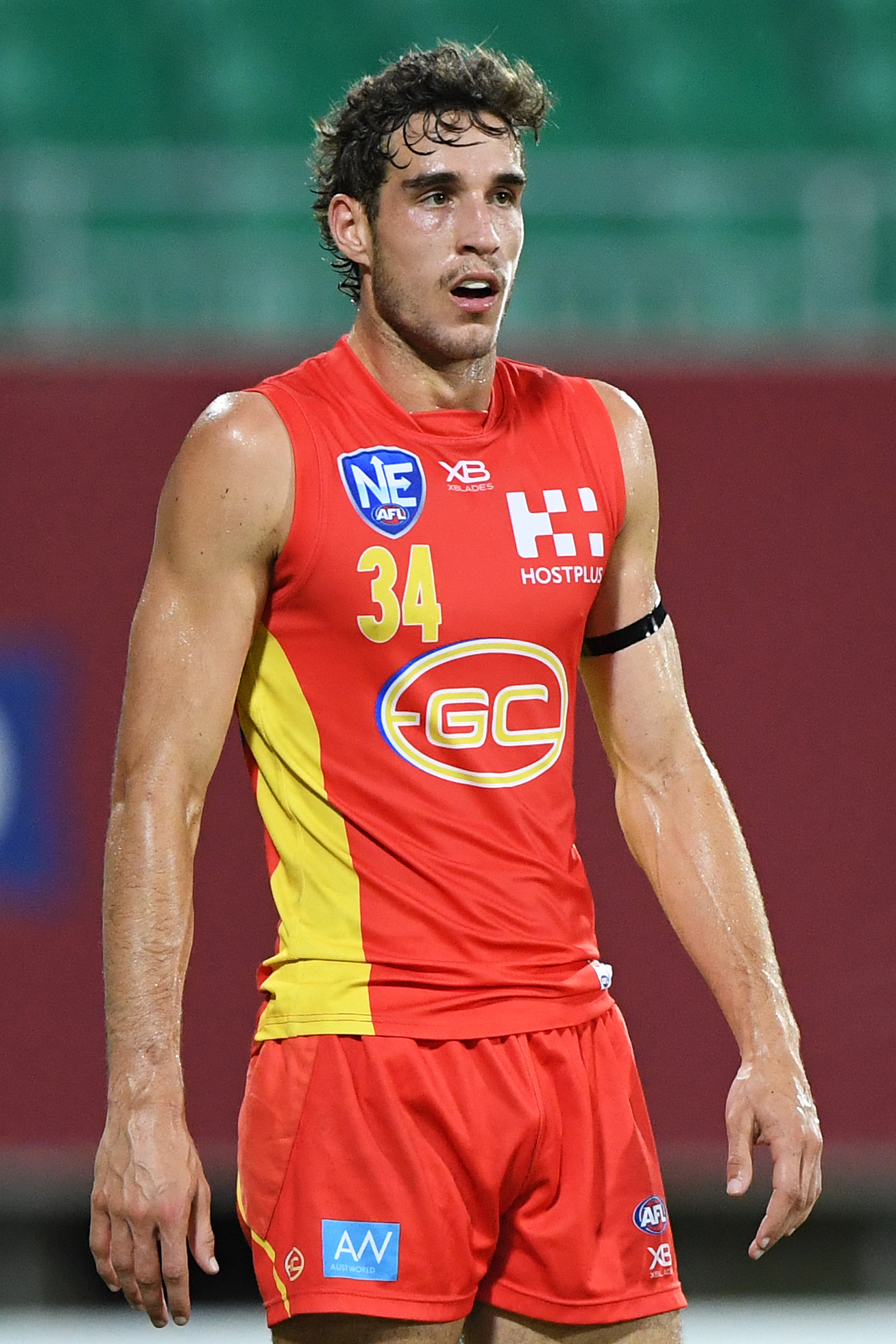
Ben King in 2019

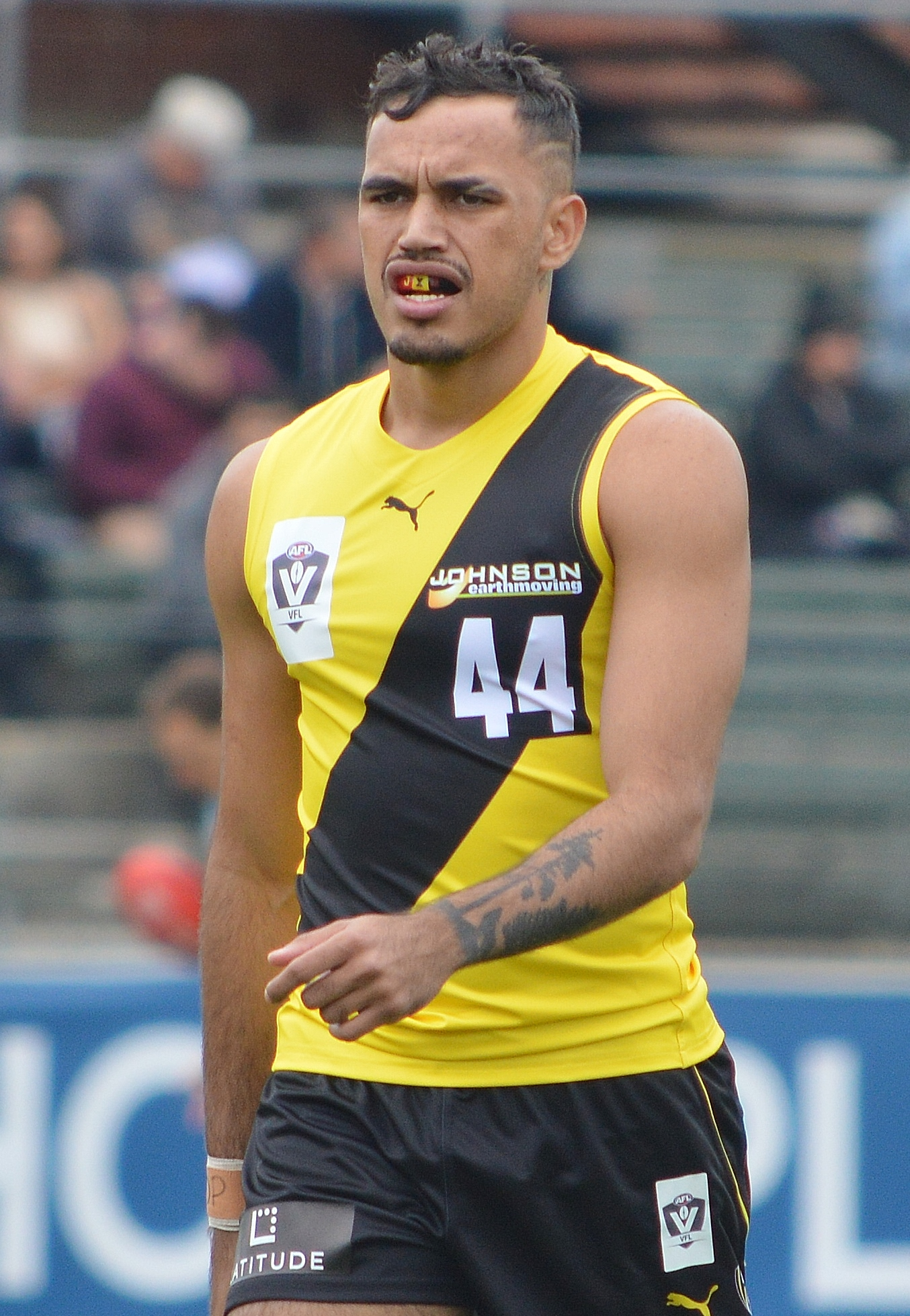
Sydney Stack in 2021

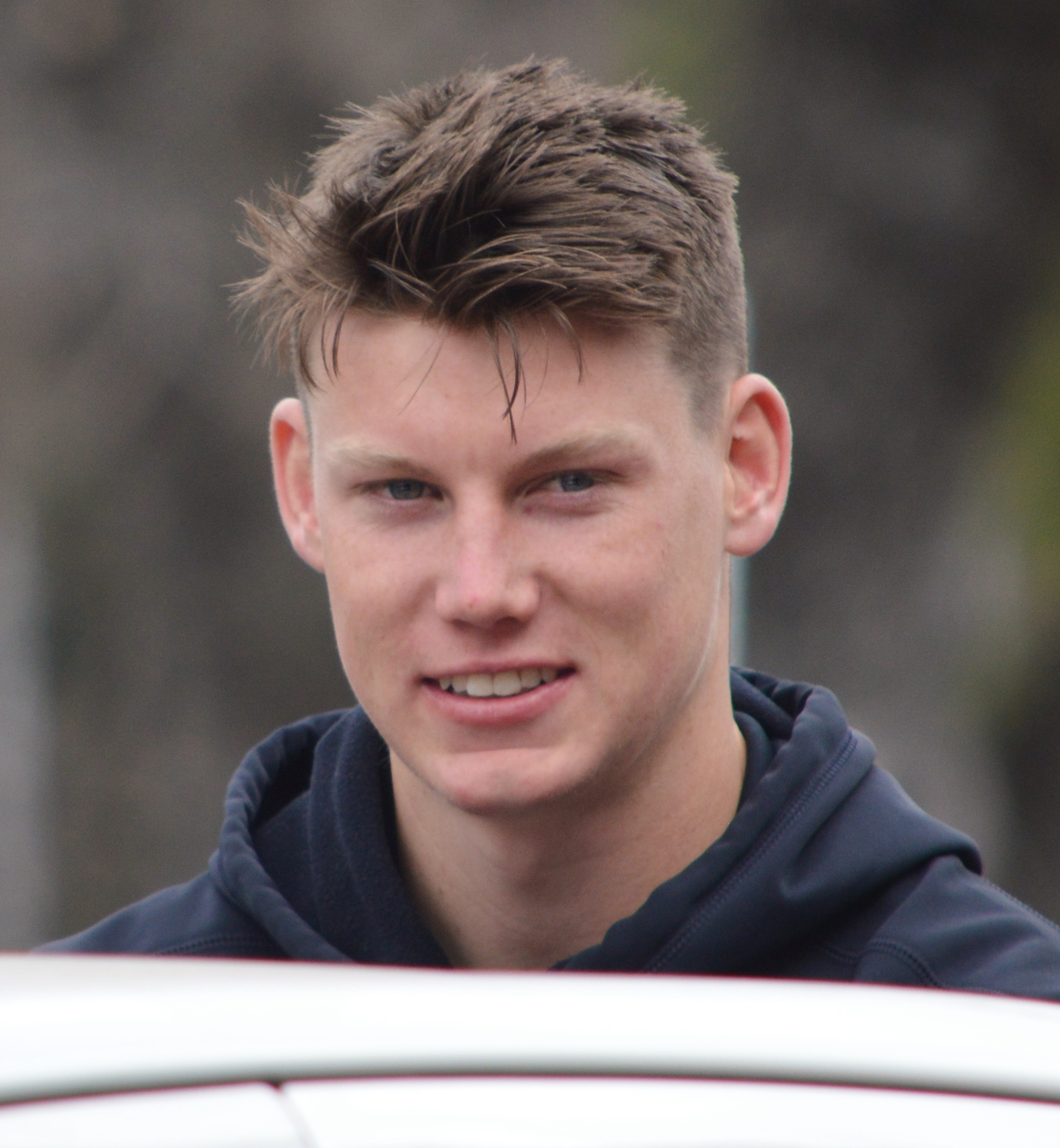
Sam Walsh in 2019

=== 2014/15 (U17) ===
Zachary Sproule, Kobe Mutch, Will Setterfield, Harrison Macreadie, Matthew Scharenberg, Jack Graham, Steven Slimming, Jack Bowes, Brad Scheer, Jacob Allison, Curtis Marsden, Jarrod Berry, Will Brodie, Ben Ainsworth, Jarrod Korewha, Jordan Galluci, Jack Scrimshaw, Noah Hura, Sam Petrevski-Seton, Sam Powell-Pepper, Jeremy Goddard, Luke Strnadica, Joshua Rotham, Ben McGuinness, Brandon Parfitt

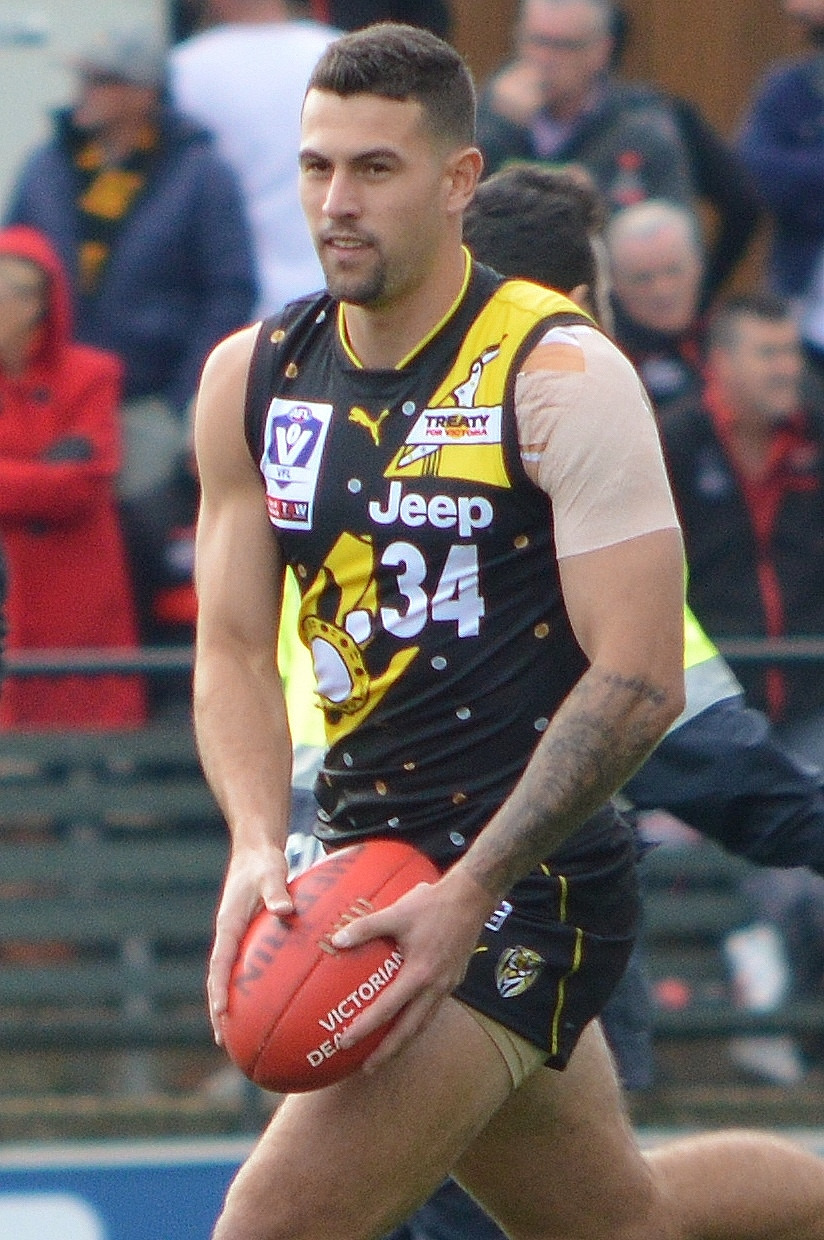
Jack Graham in 2019

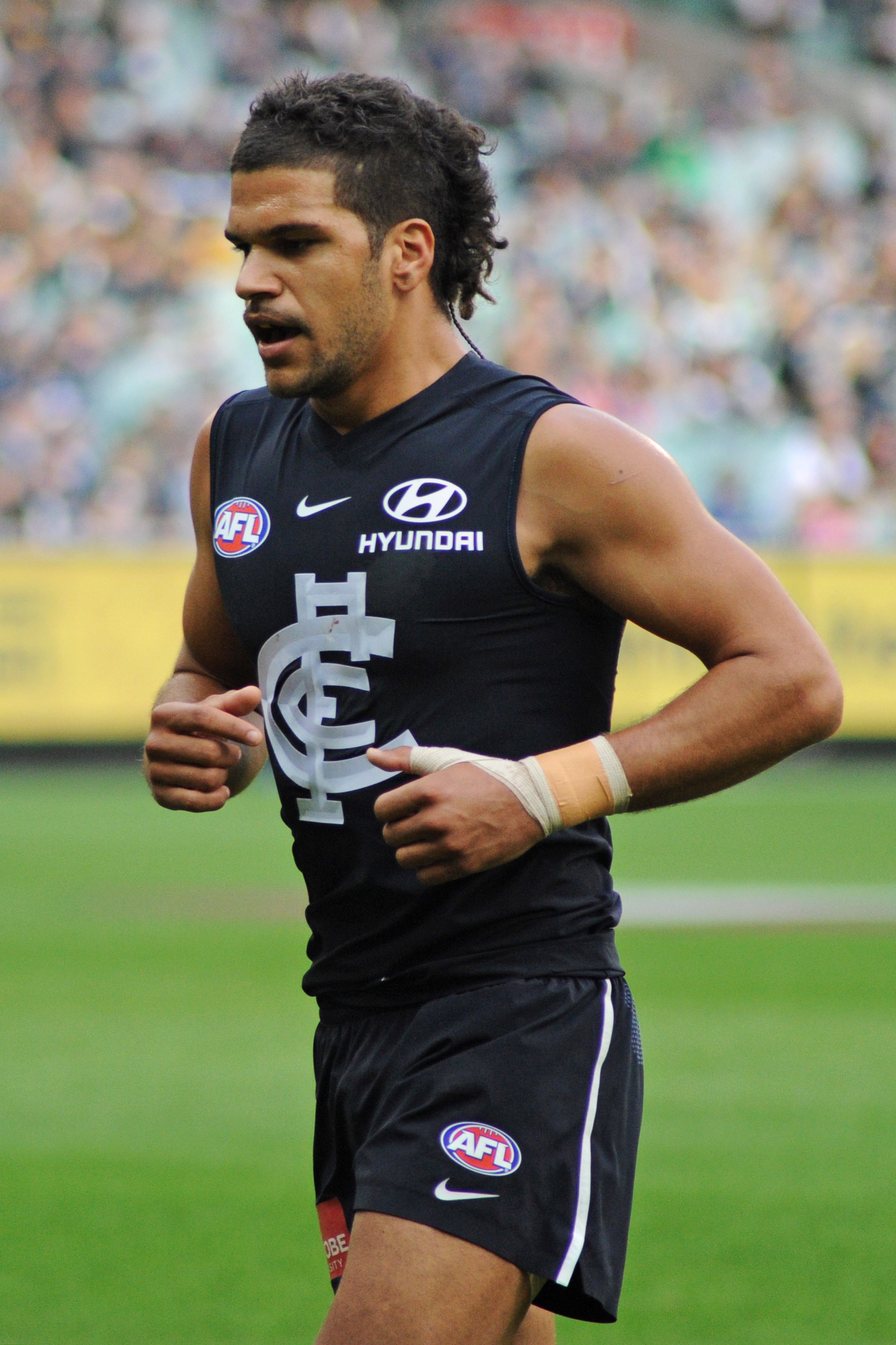
Sam Petrevski-Seton in 2018

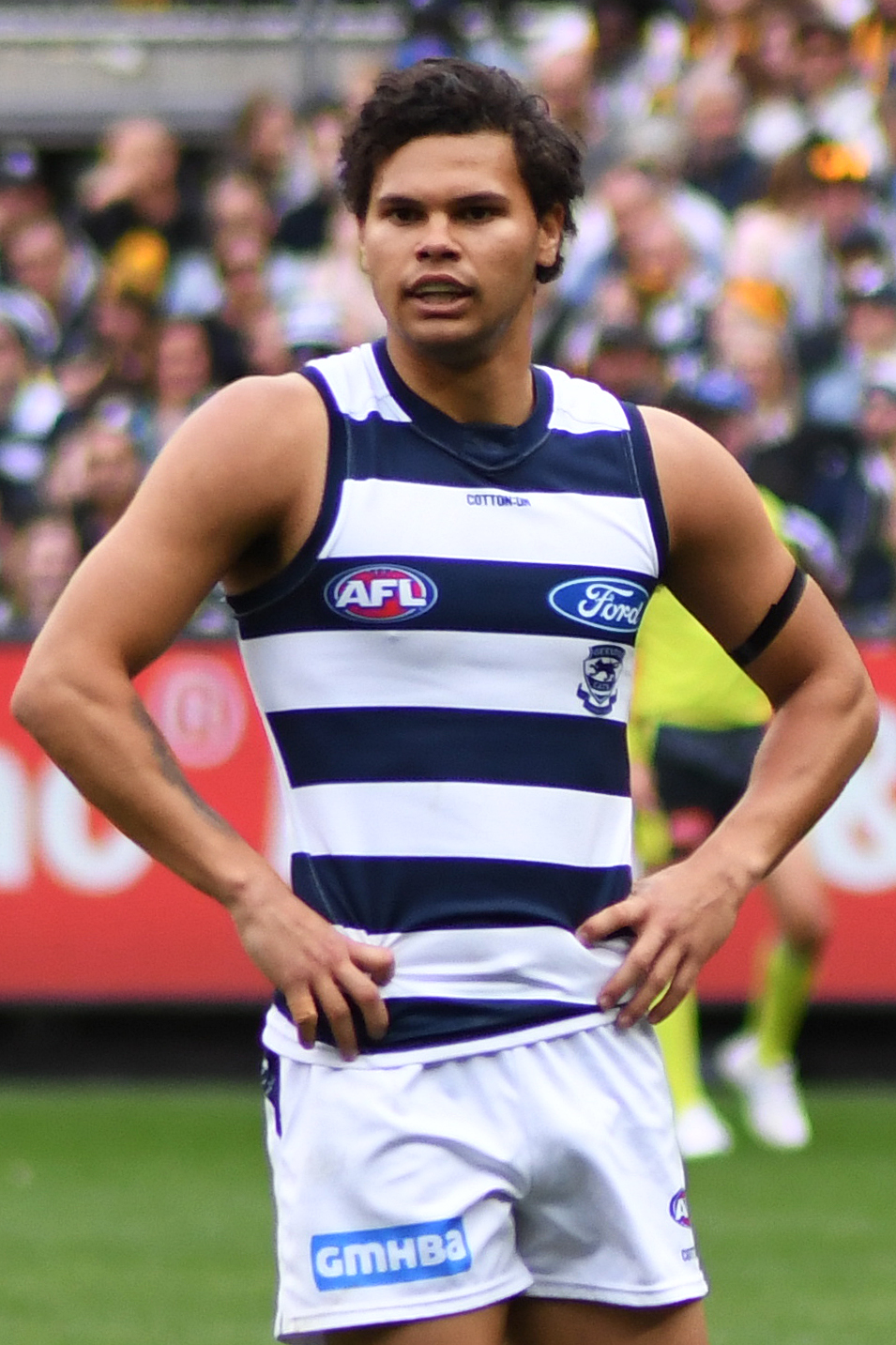
Brandon Parfitt in 2019

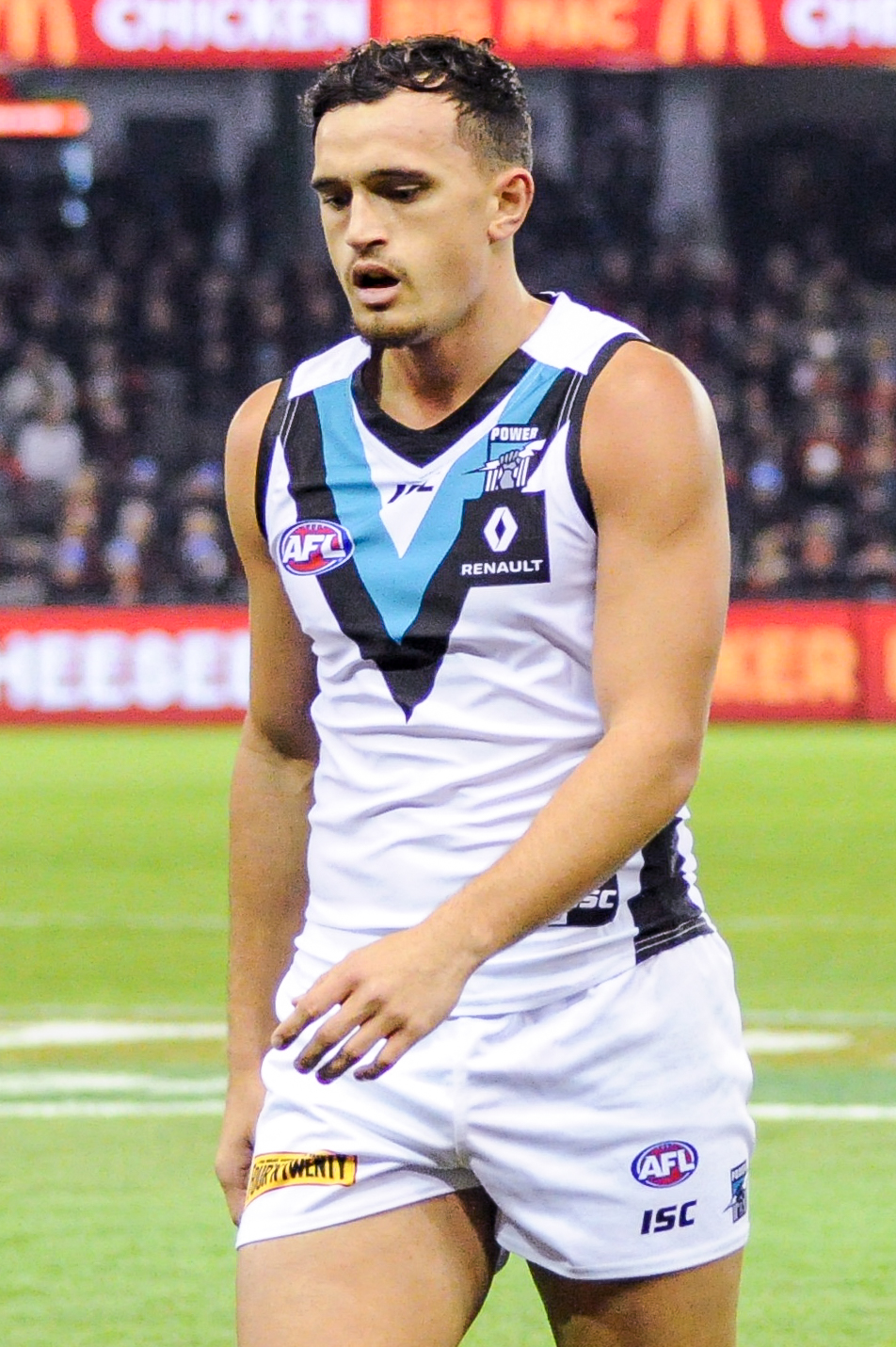
Sam Powell-Pepper in 2017

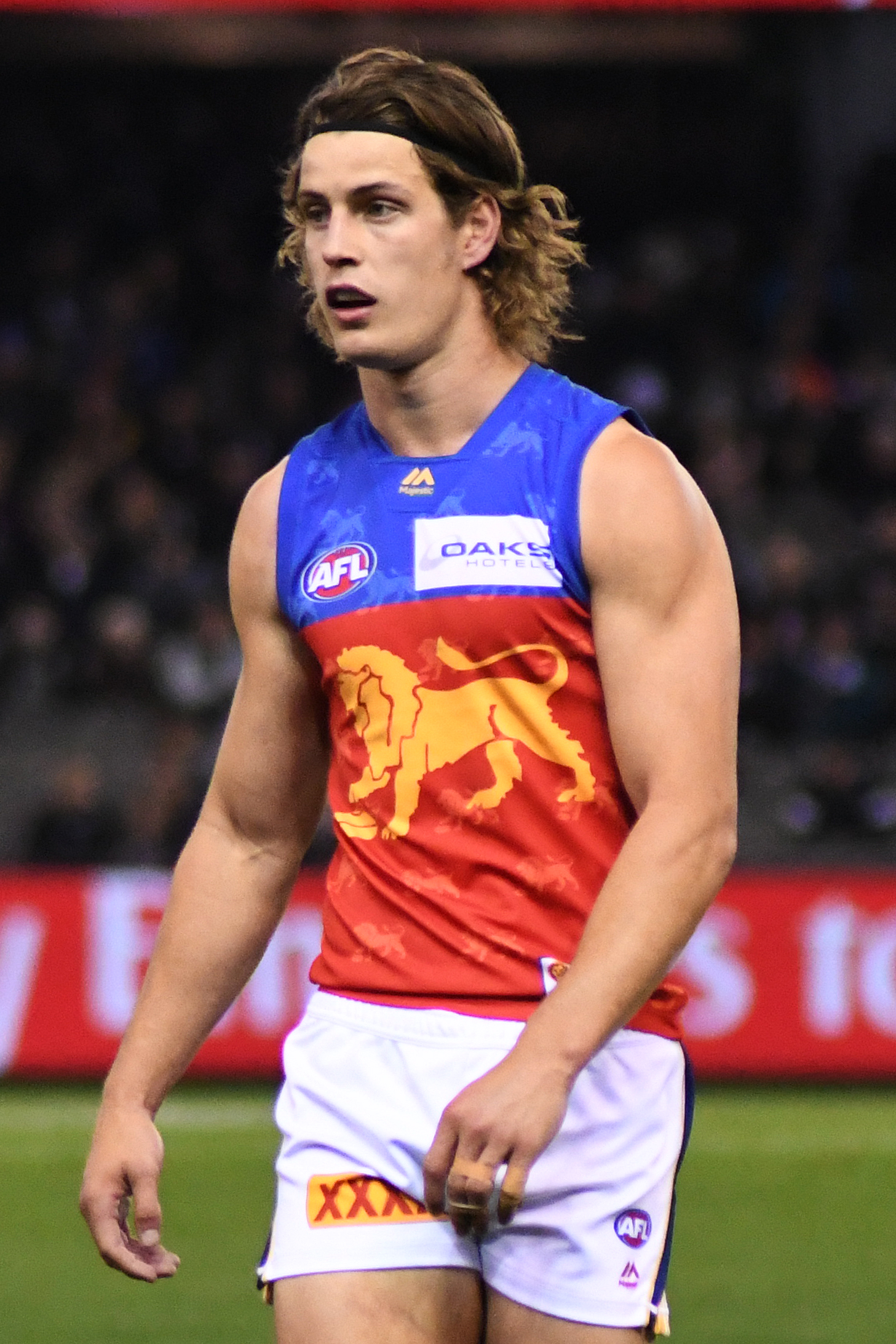
Jarrod Berry in 2018

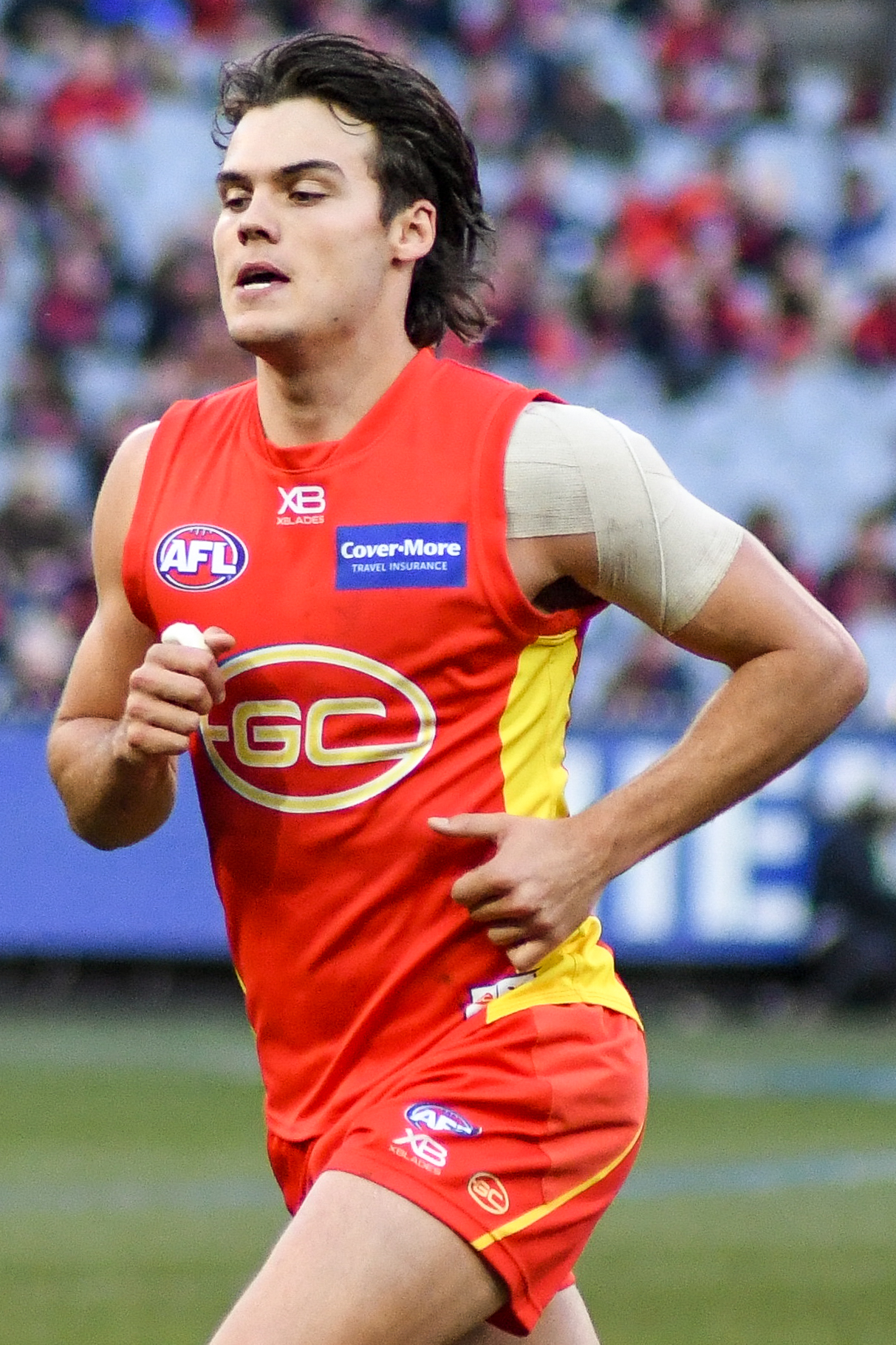
Jack Bowes in 2018

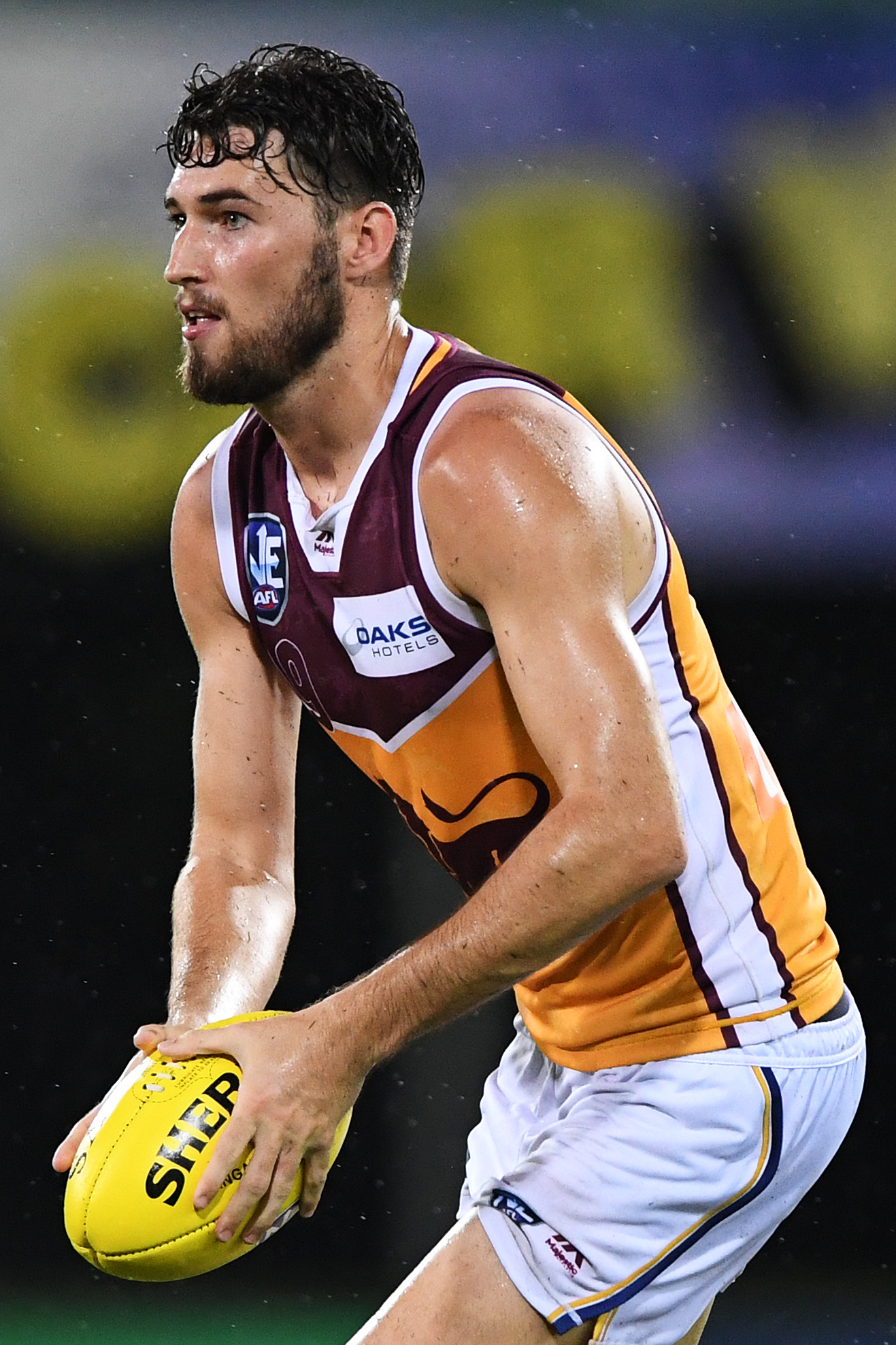
Jacob Allison in 2019

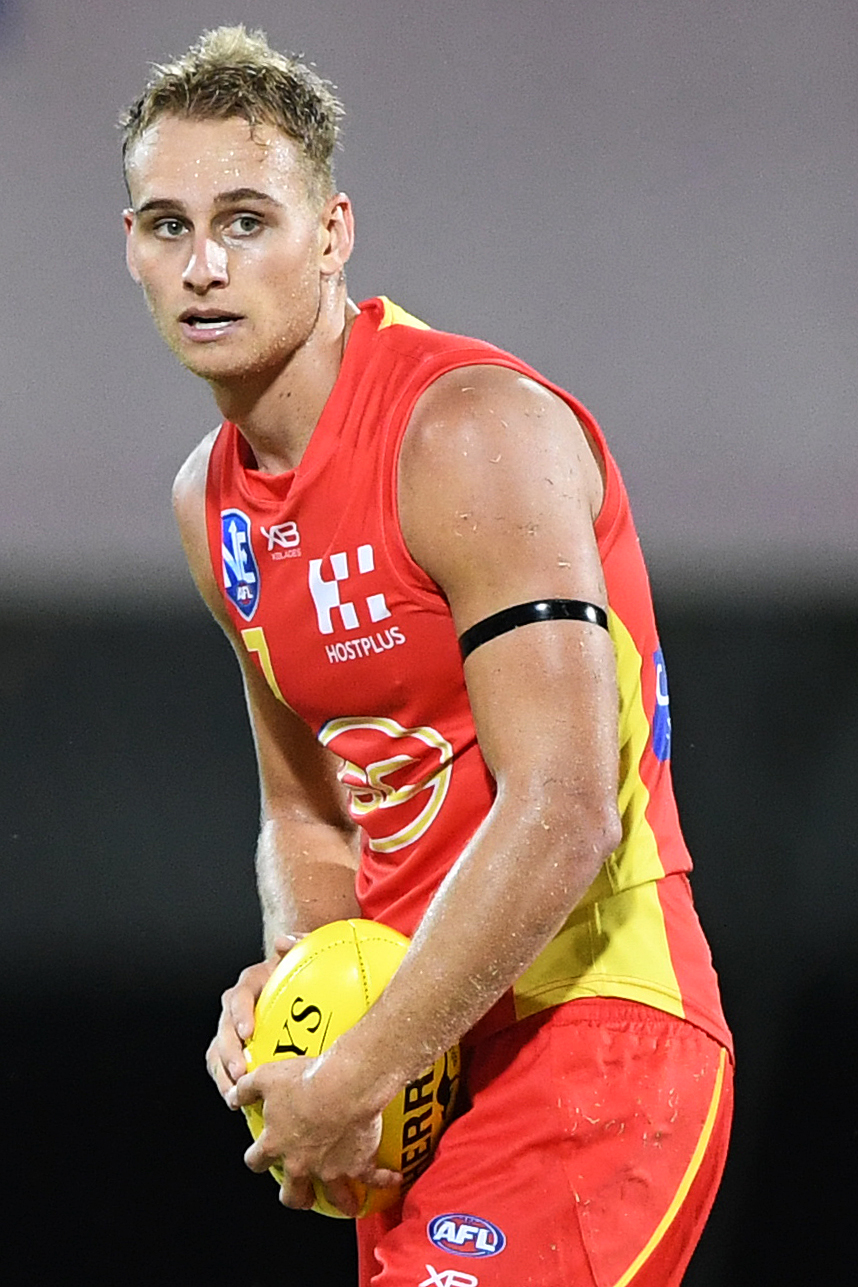
Will Brodie in 2019

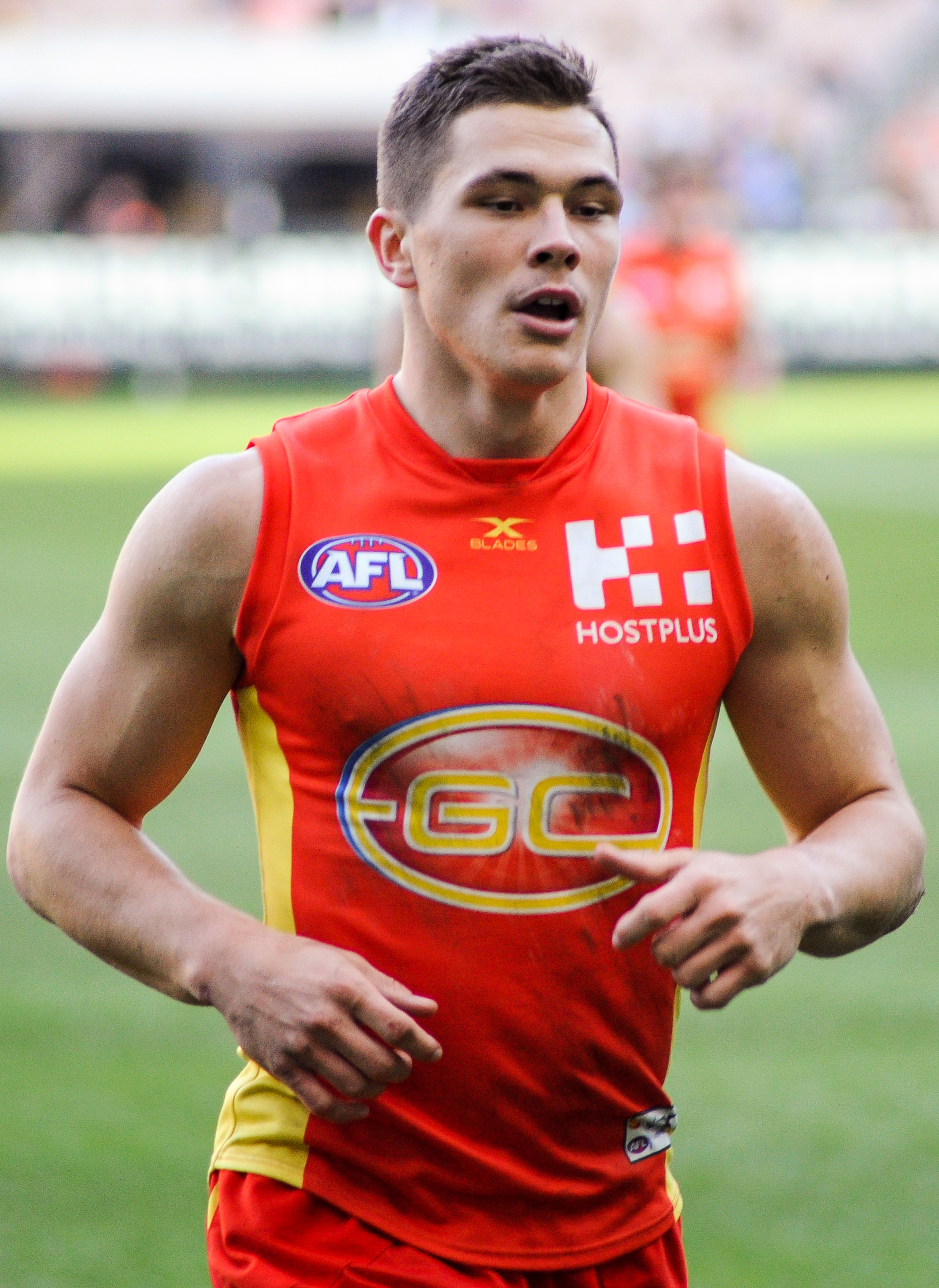
Ben Ainsworth in 2017

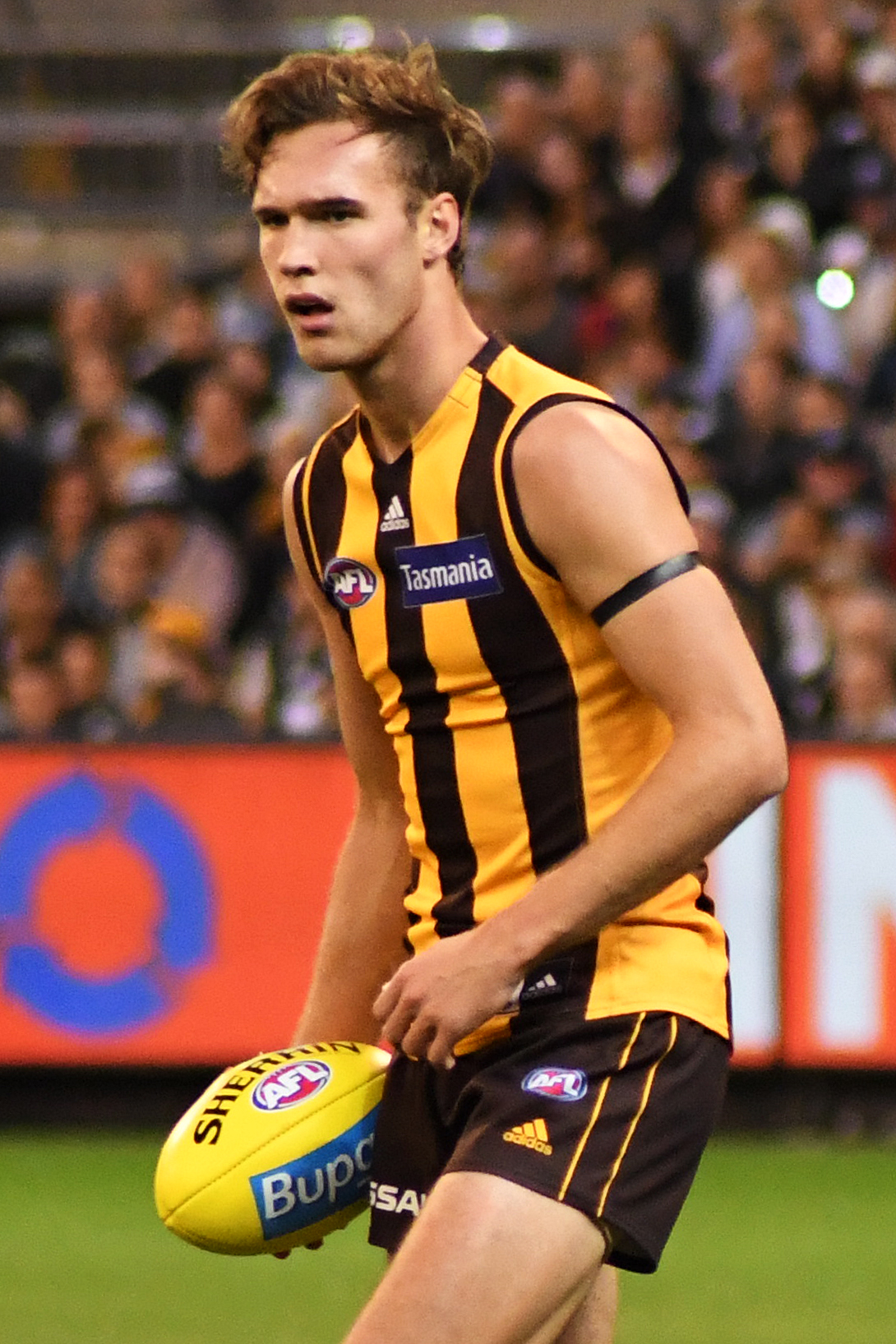
Jack Scrimshaw in 2019

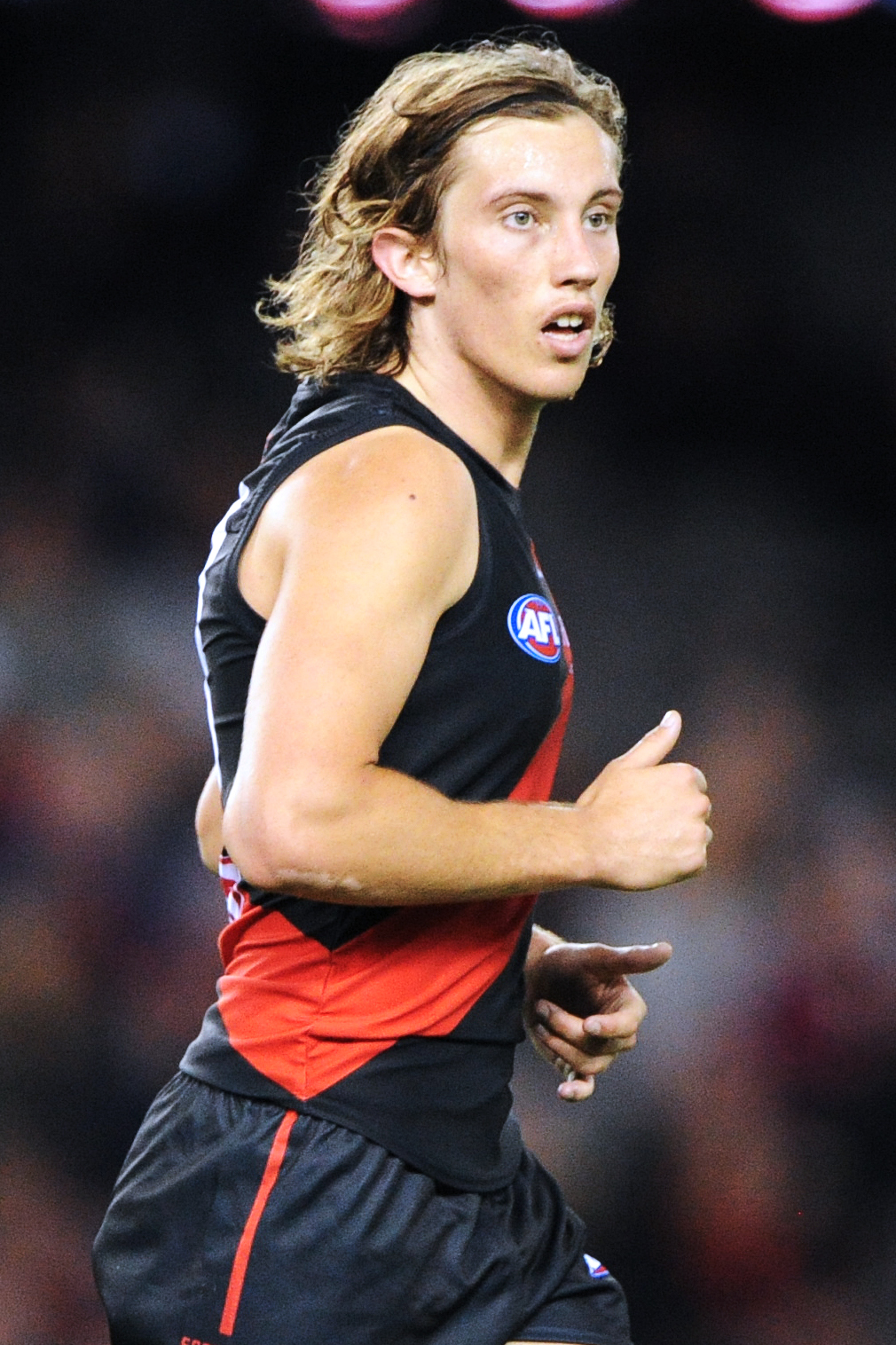
Kobe Mutch in 2018

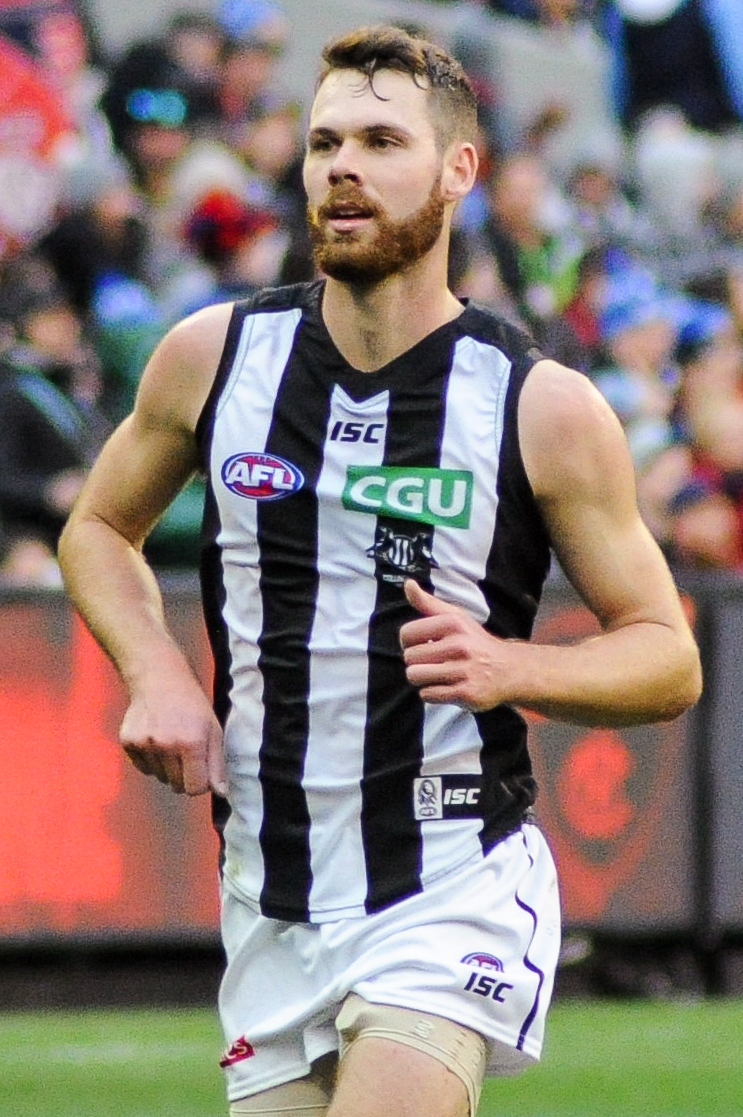
Matthew Scharenberg in 2017

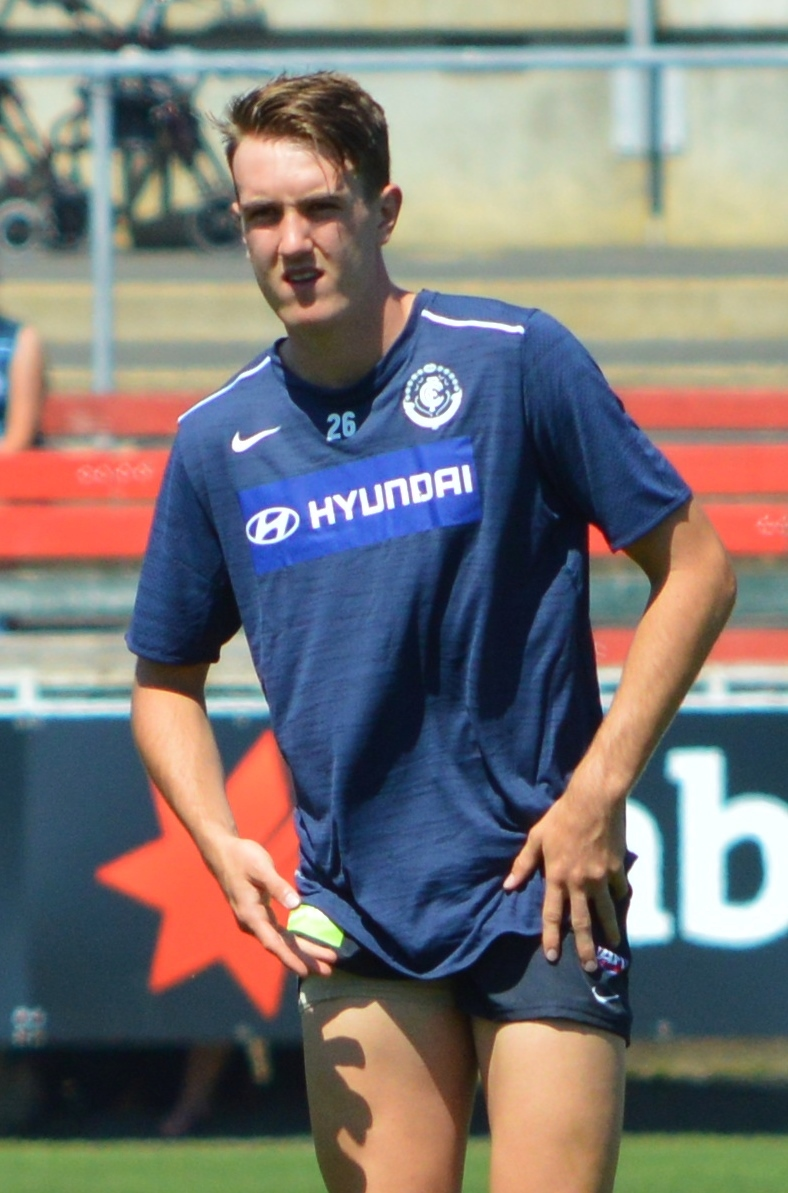
Harrison Macreadie in 2017

=== 2013 (U17) ===
Isaac Heeney, Sam Durdin, Lachlan Weller, Liam Dawson, Matthew Hammelmann, Jaden McGrath, Tom Lamb, Hugh Goddard, Liam Duggan, Angus Brayshaw, Jake Lever, Darcy Moore, Peter Wright, Jarrod Pickett, Clem Smith, Bradley Walsh, Nakia Cockatoo, Duom Dawam, Liam Griffiths, Nicholas Coughlan, Jack Donkersley, Mac Bower, Bohdi Walker, Daniel Caprion, Jesse Watchman, Peter Spurling, Ryan Lim, Jermaine Miller-Lewis, Matthew Ah Siu, Warrick Wilson

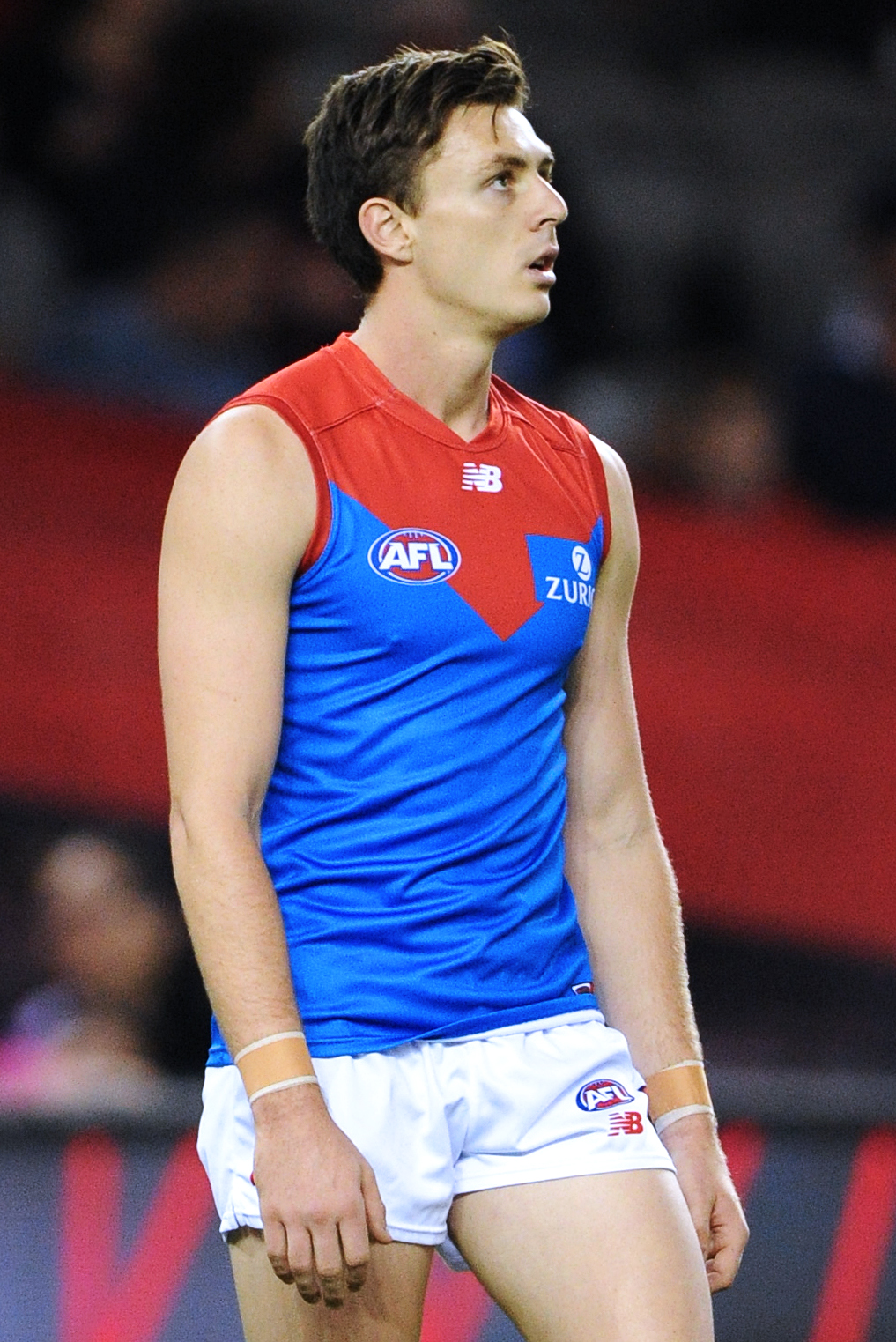
Jake Lever AFL premiership player and All-Australian in 2018

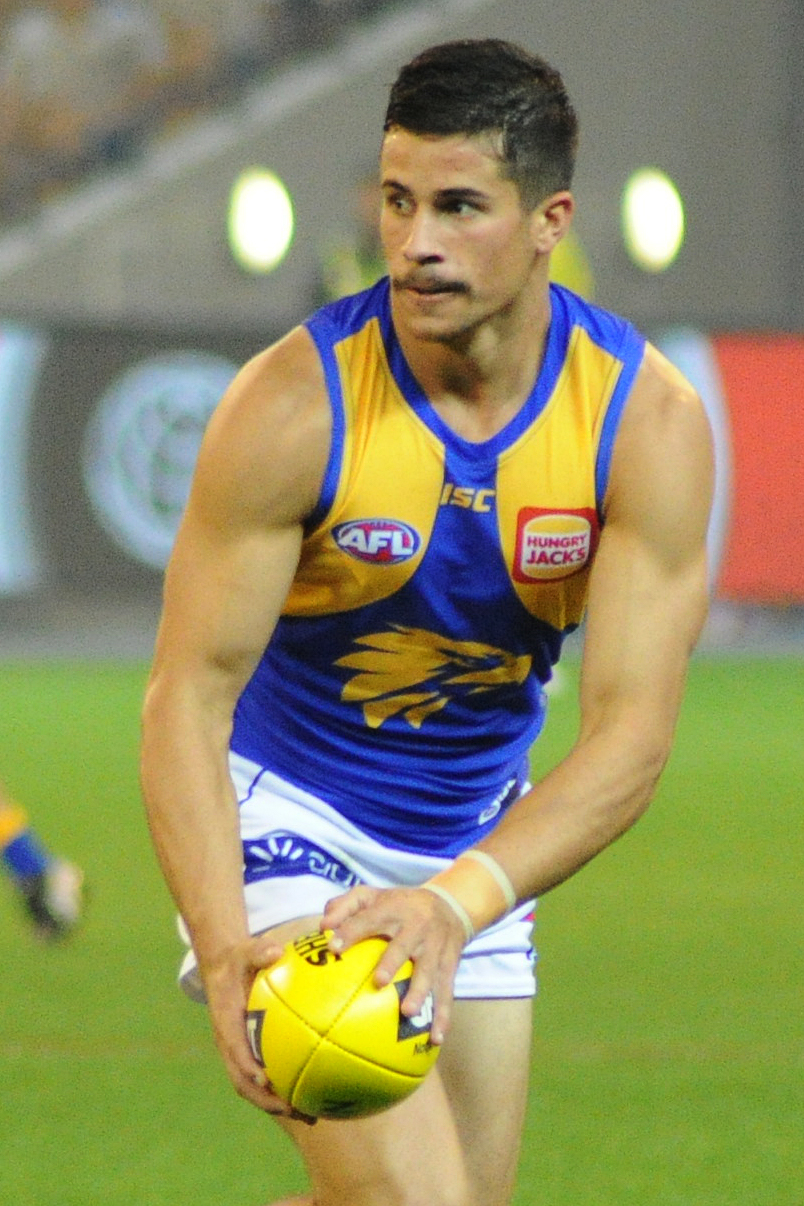
Liam Duggan AFL premiership player in 2018

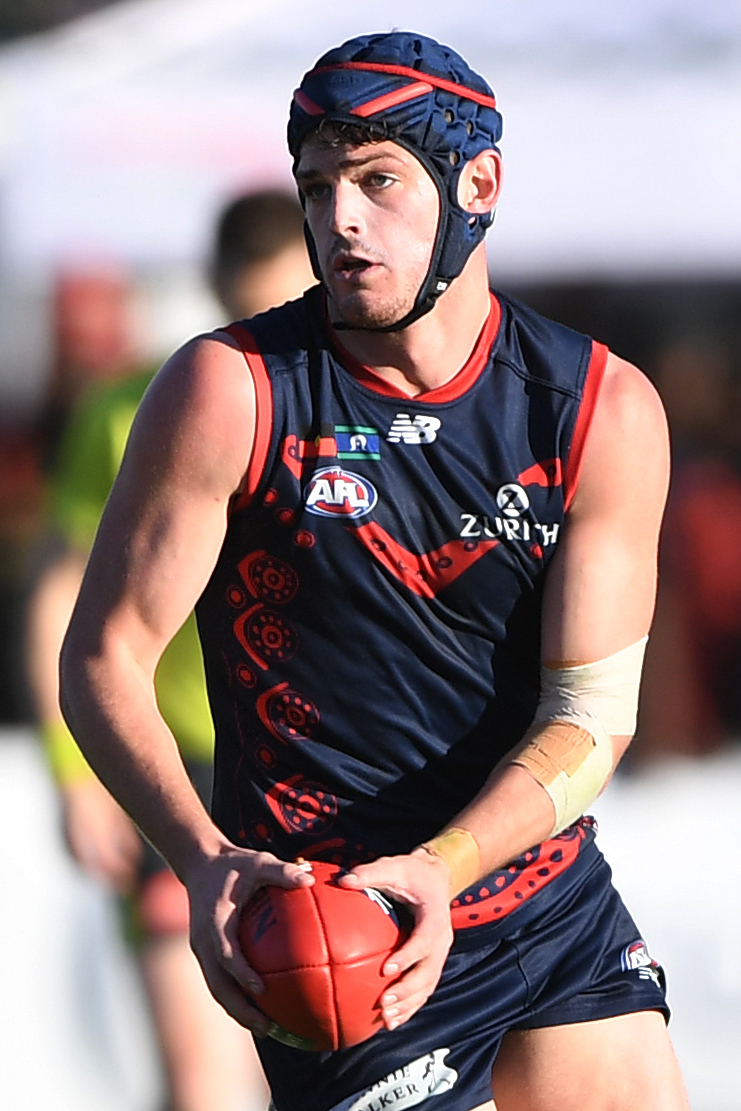
Angus Brayshaw AFL premiership player in 2019

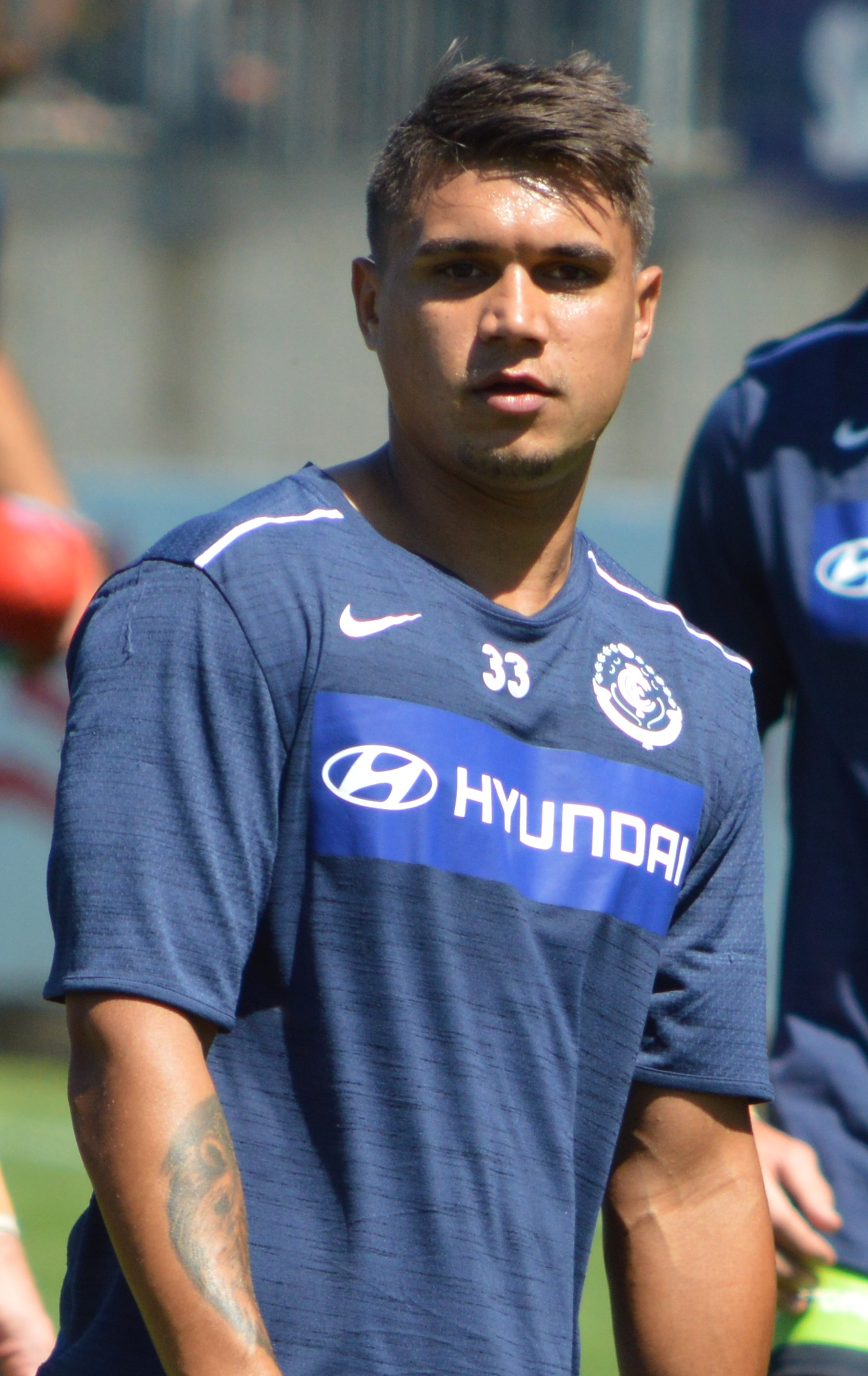
Jarrod Pickett Indigenous All-Star in 2017

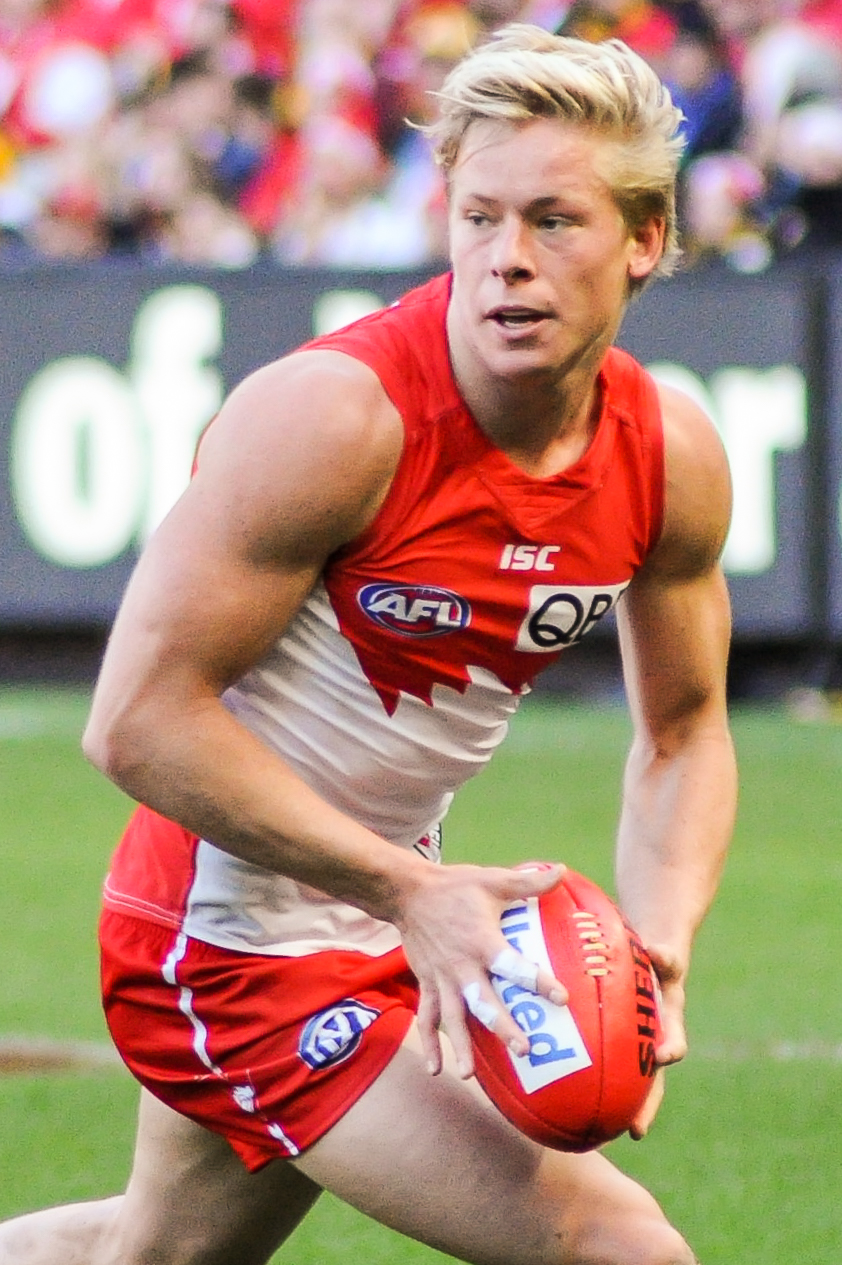
Isaac Heeney in 2017

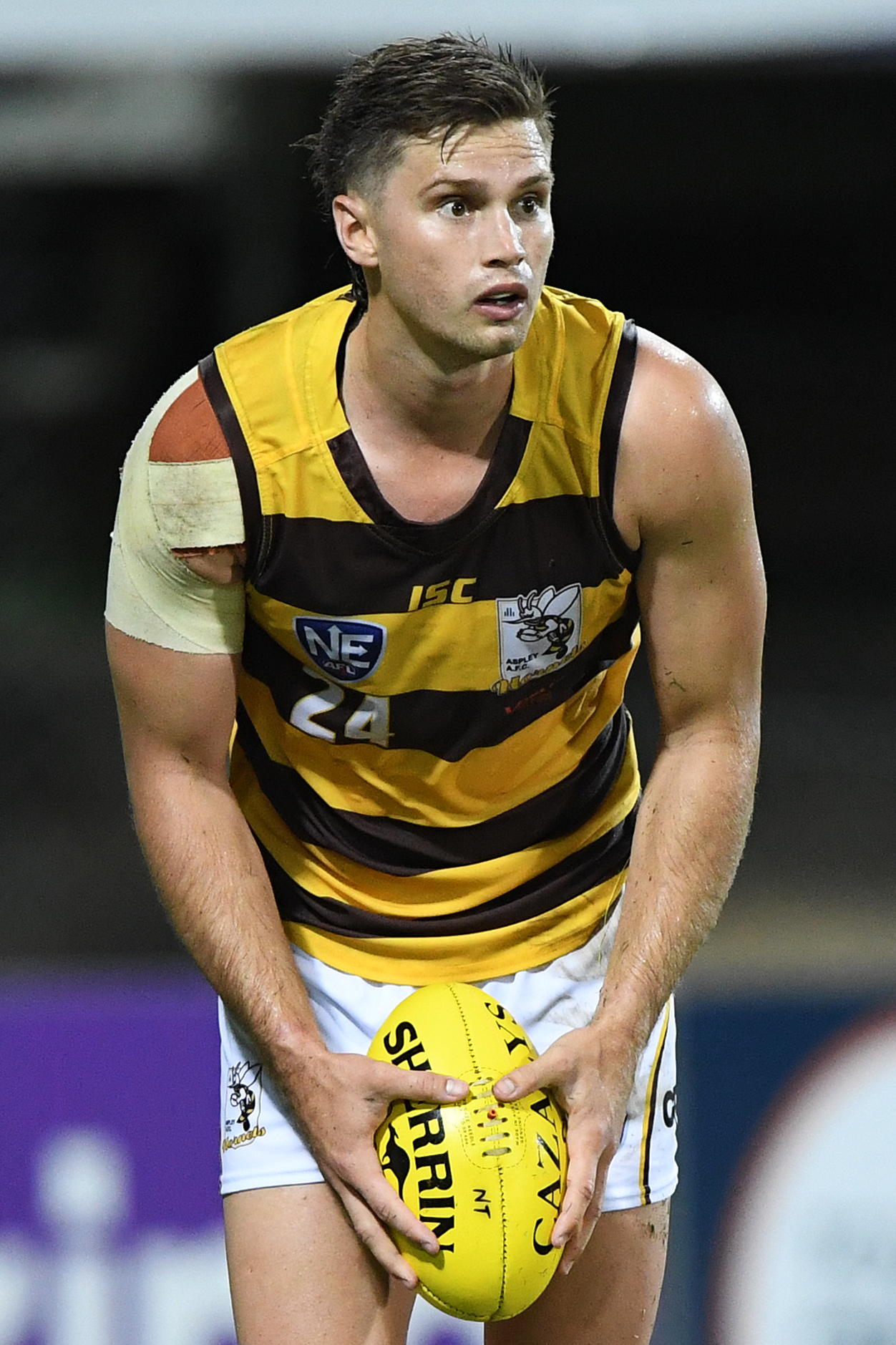
Liam Dawson in 2019

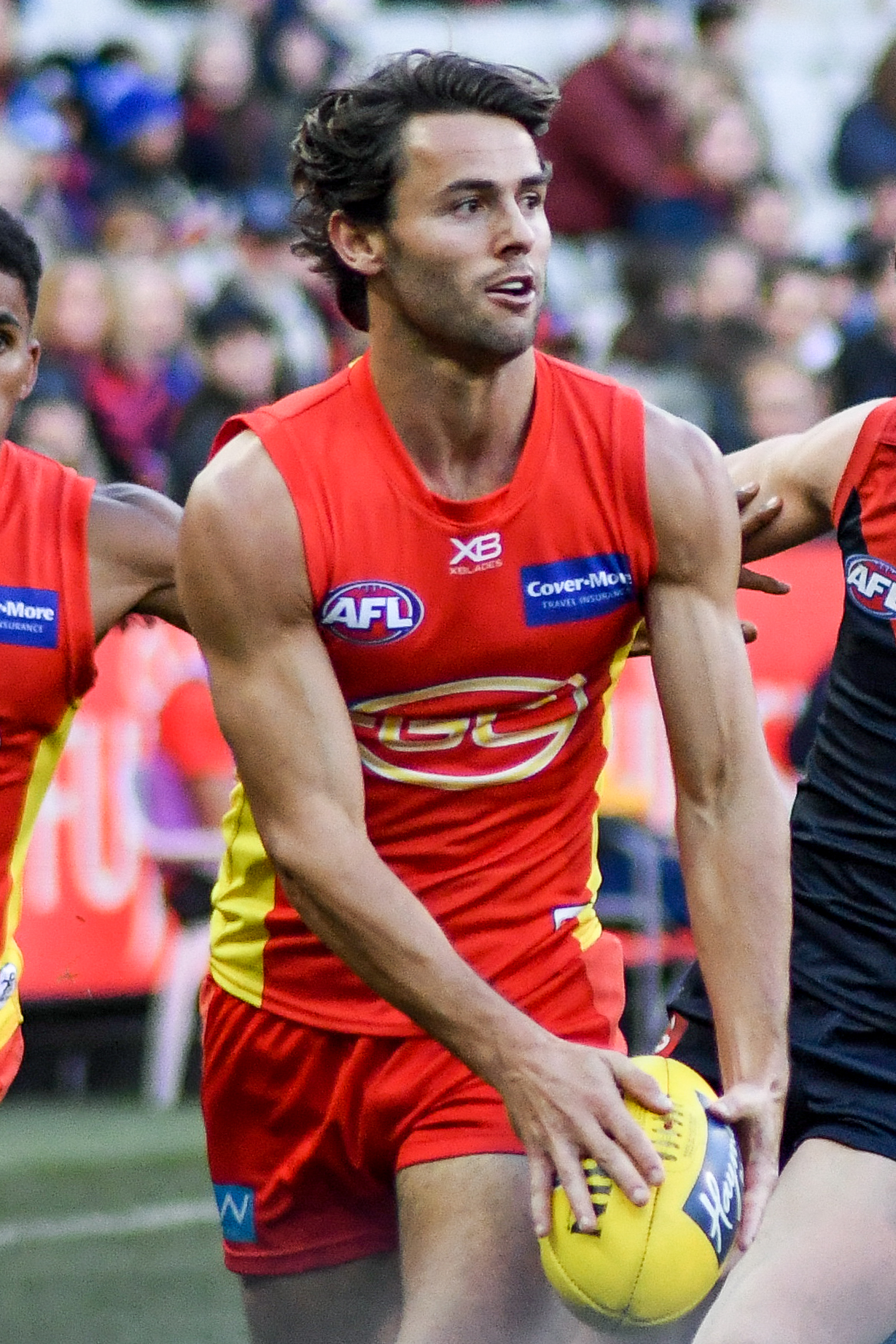
Lachlan Weller in 2018

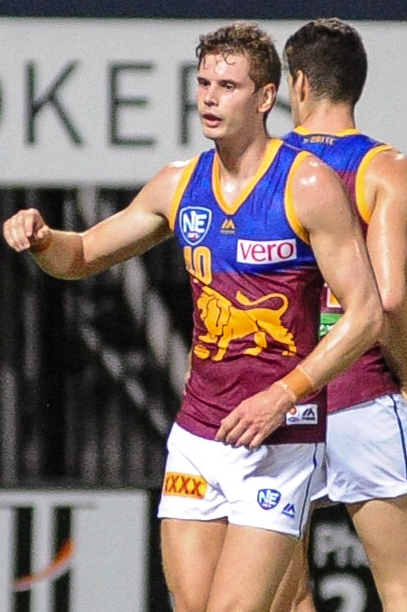
Matthew Hammelmann in 2017

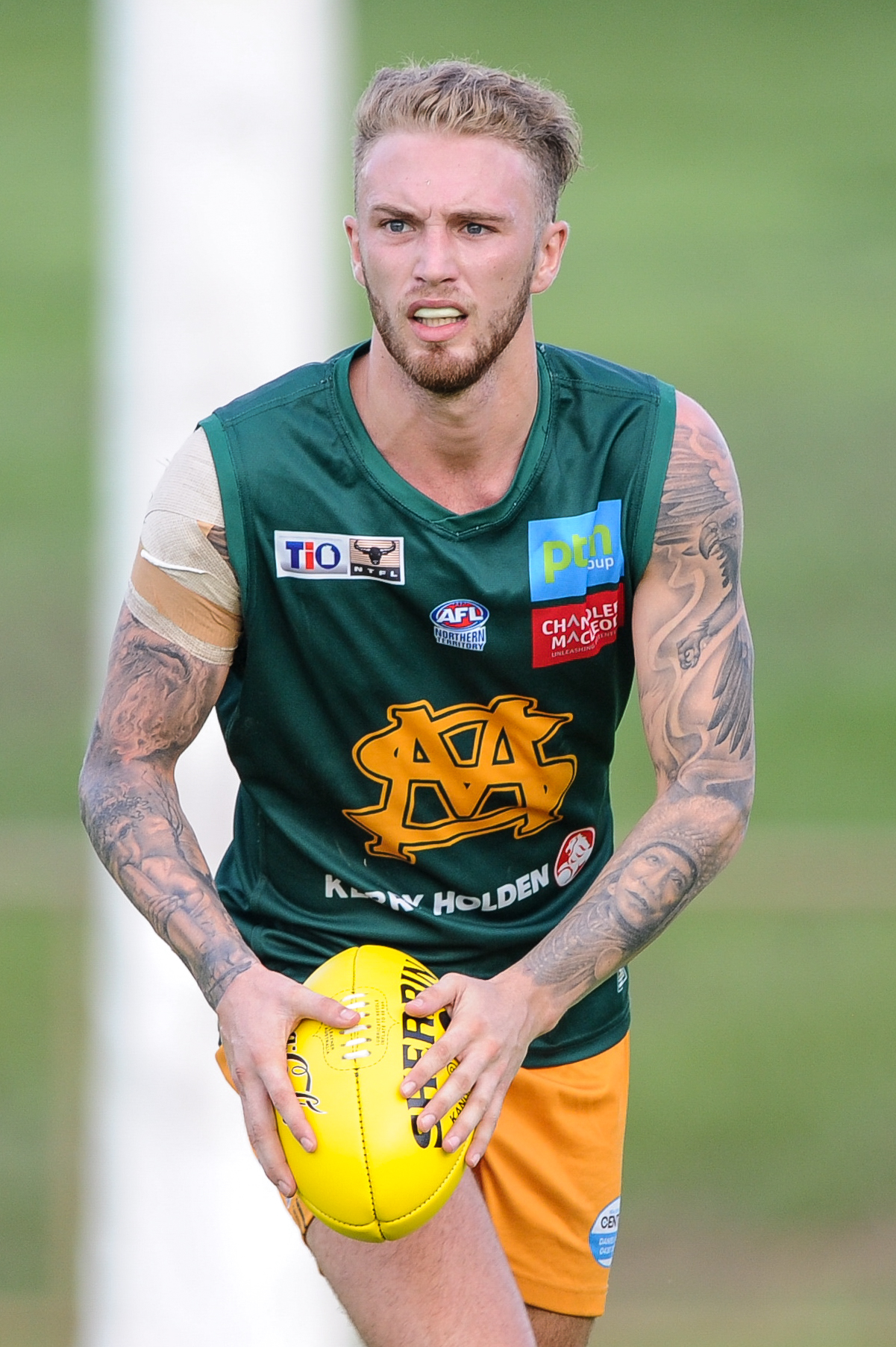
Jaden McGrath in 2017

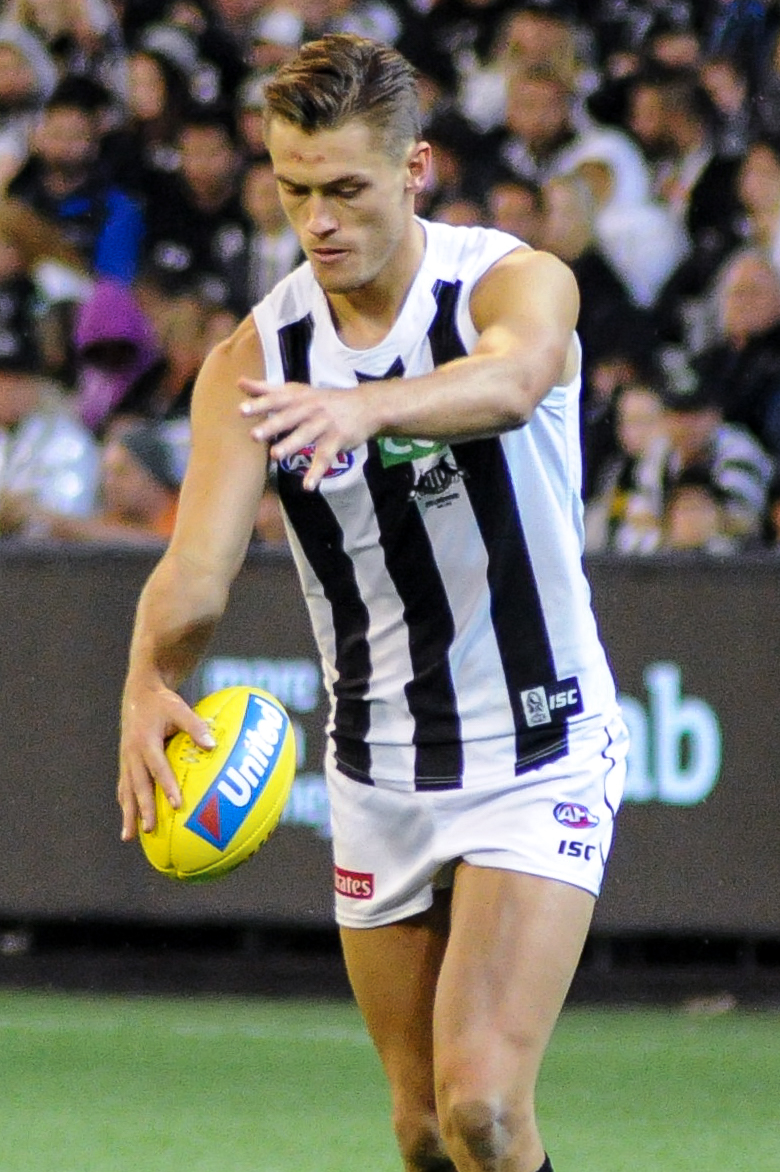
Darcy Moore in 2017

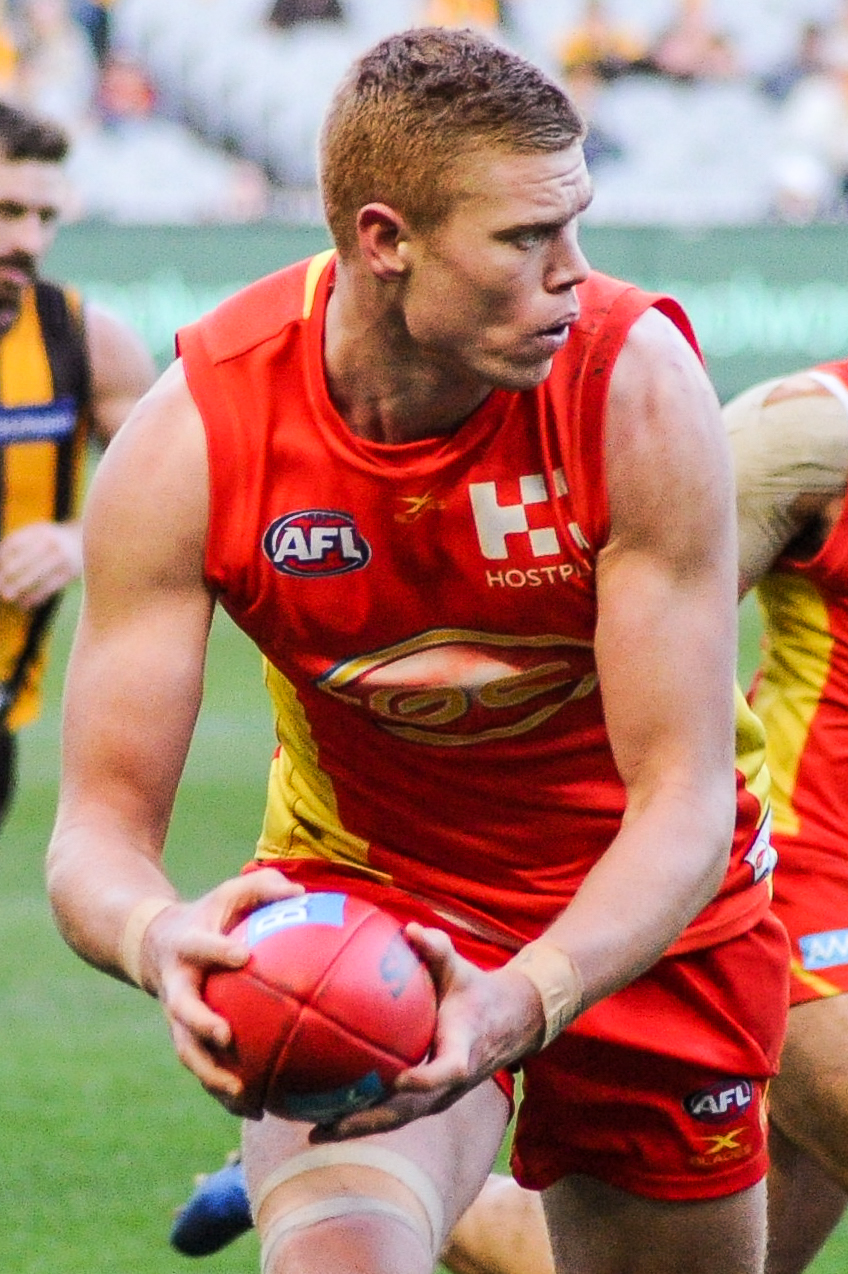
Peter Wright in 2017

=== 2012 (U17) ===
Jack Billings, Luke McDonald, Billy Hartung, Jesse Hogan, James Aish, Ben Lennon, Luke Dunstan, Matt Scharenberg, Jack Martin, Dallas Willsmore Clayton McCartney, Dylan Loo, Cain Tickner, Sam Garstone

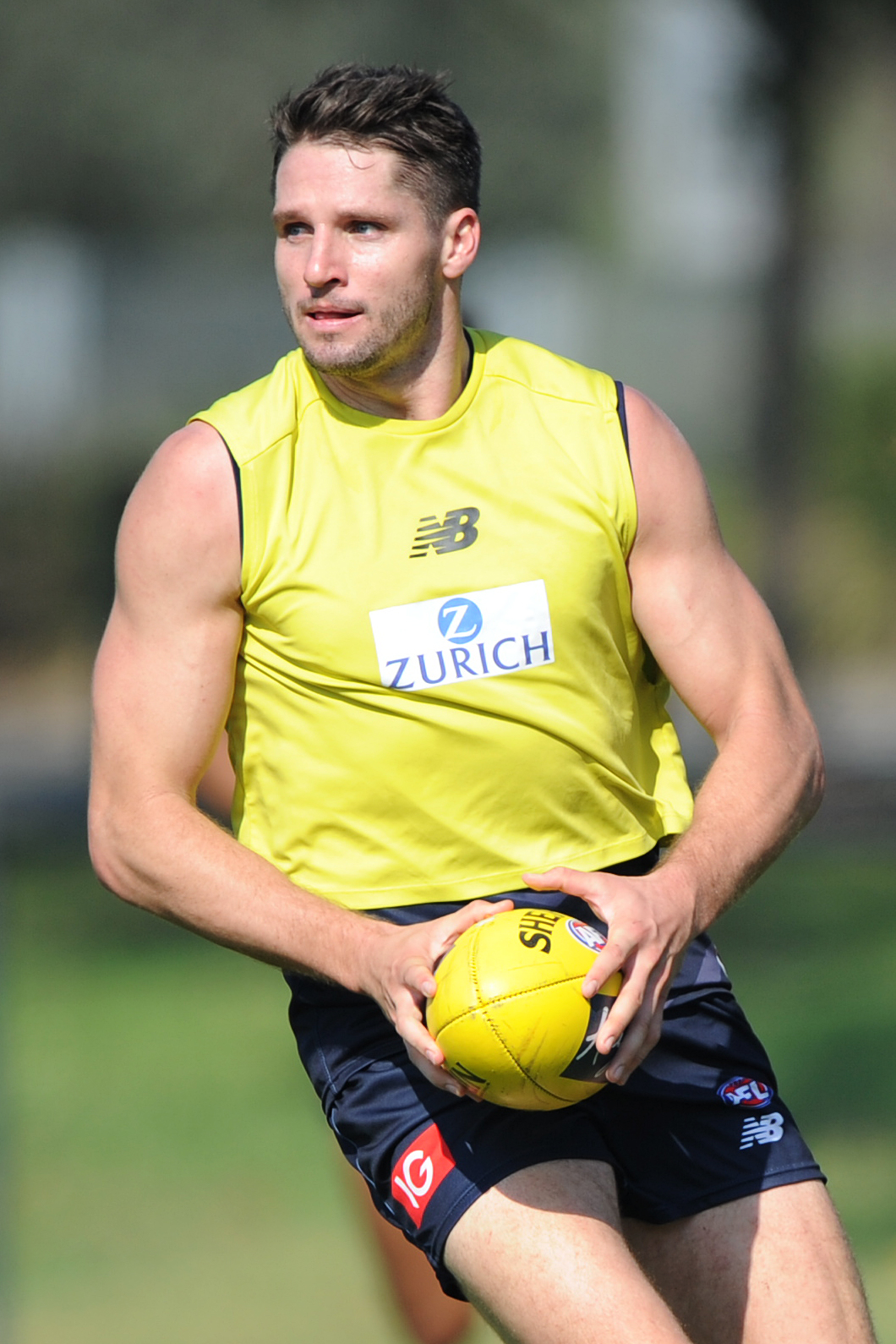
Jesse Hogan in 2018

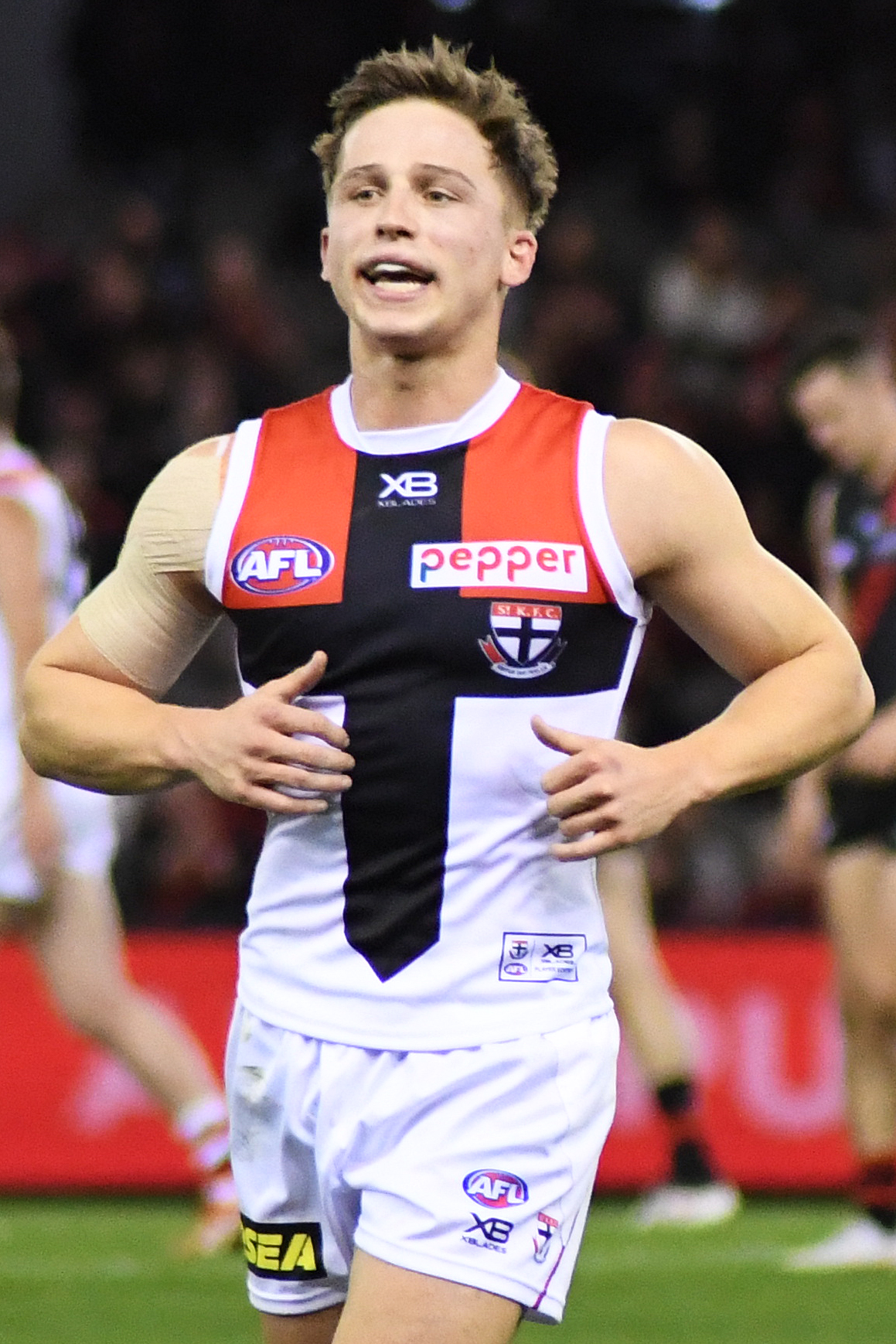
Jack Billings in 2018

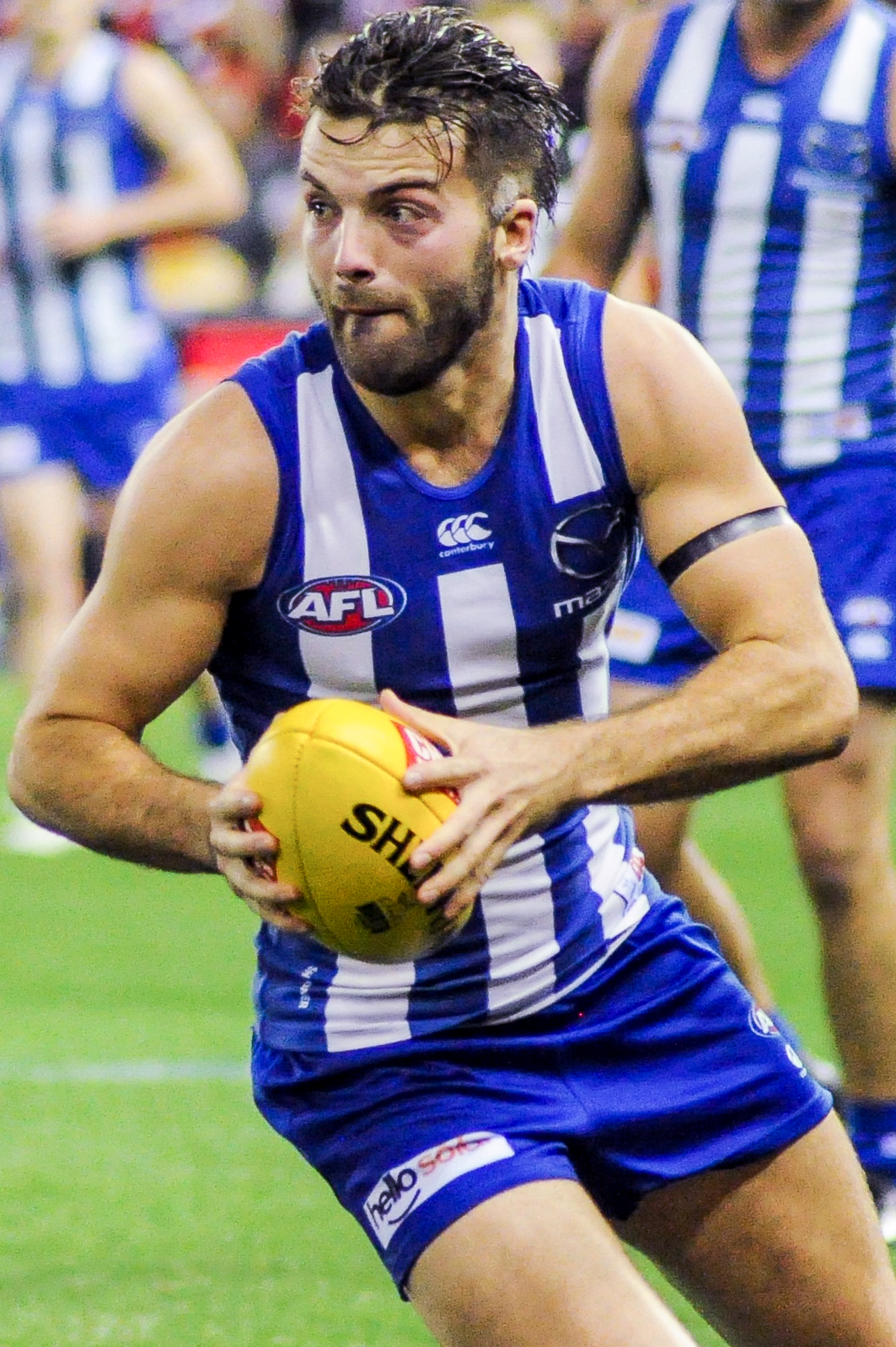
Luke McDonald in 2017

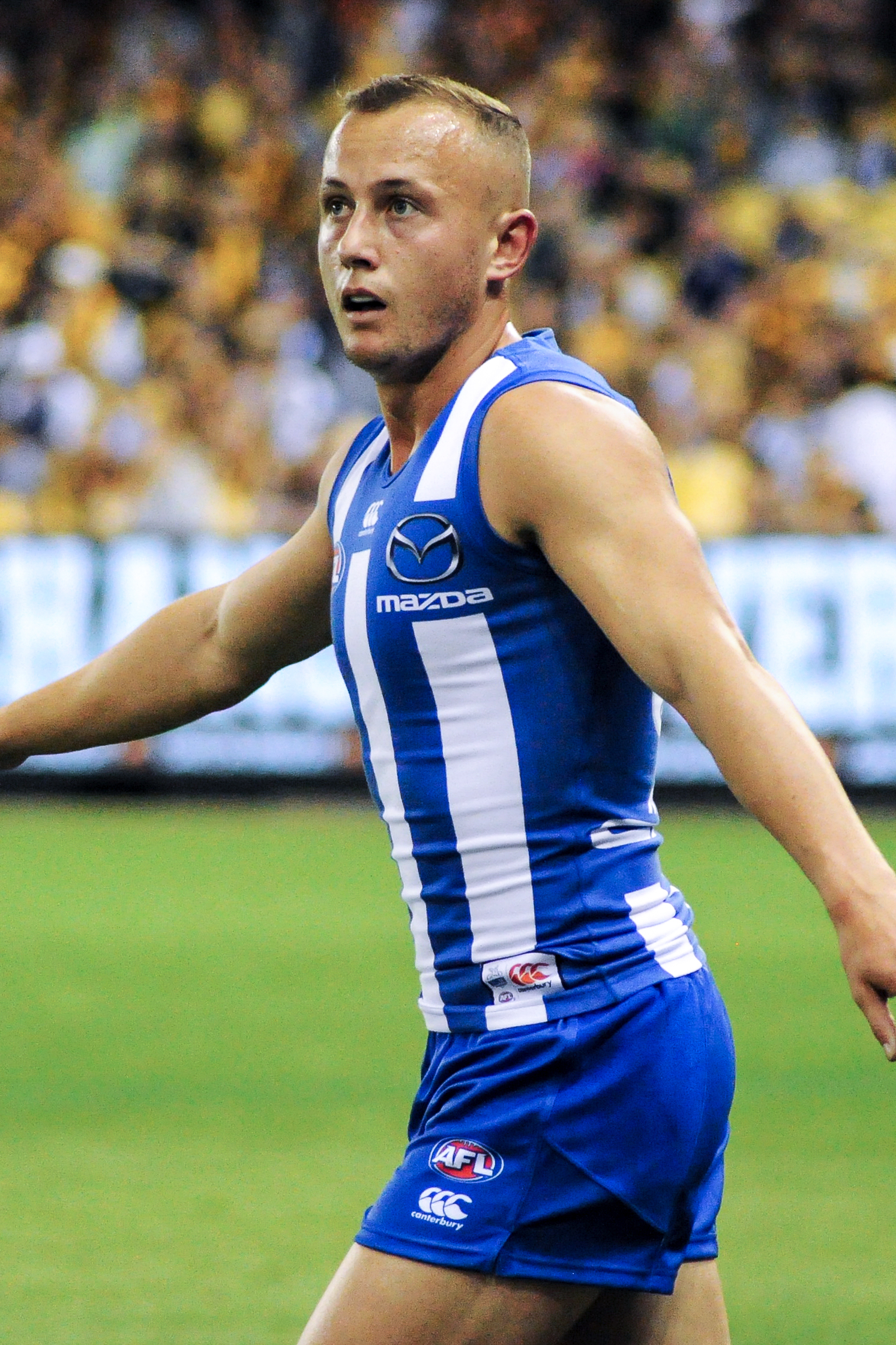
Billy Hartung in 2018

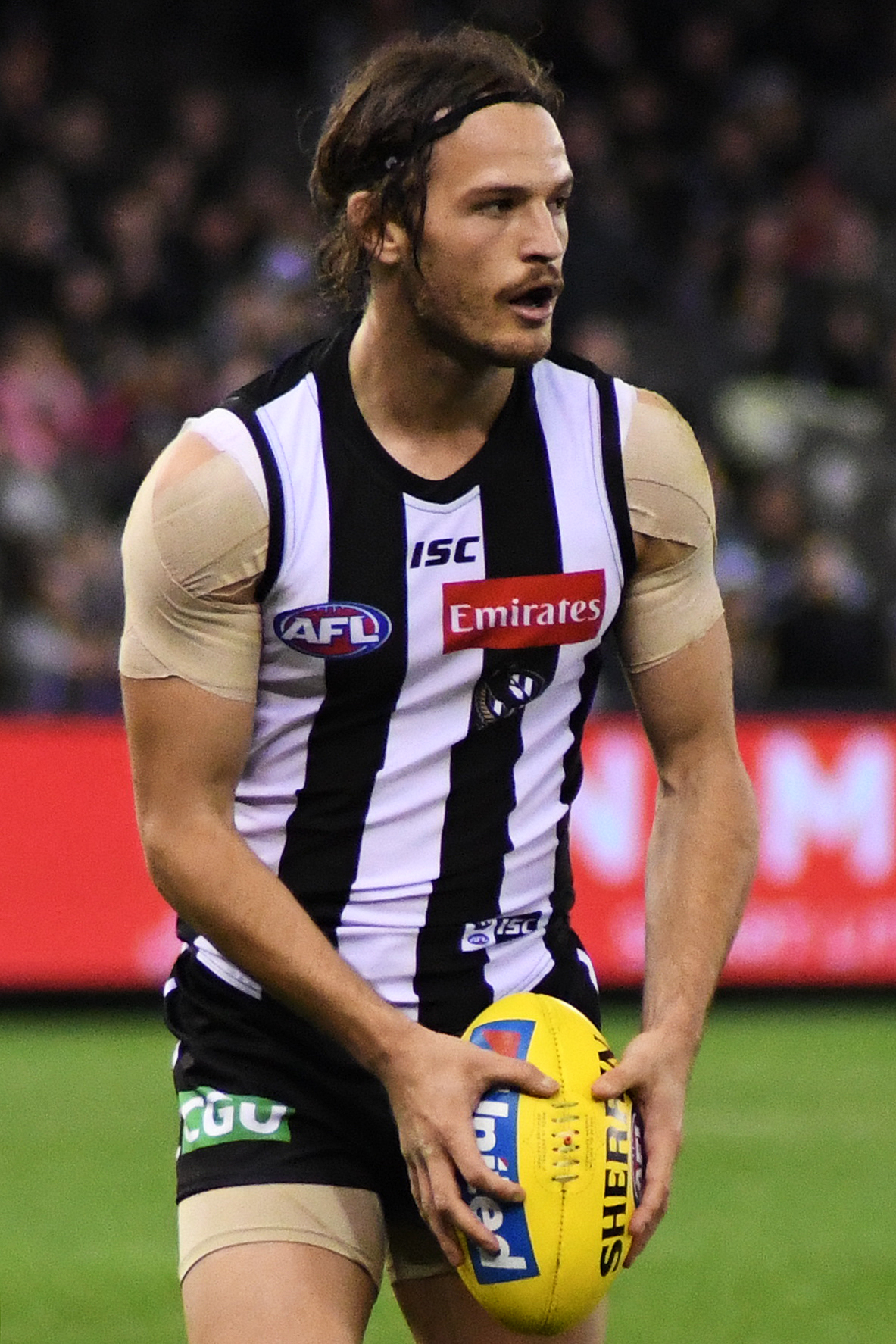
James Aish in 2018

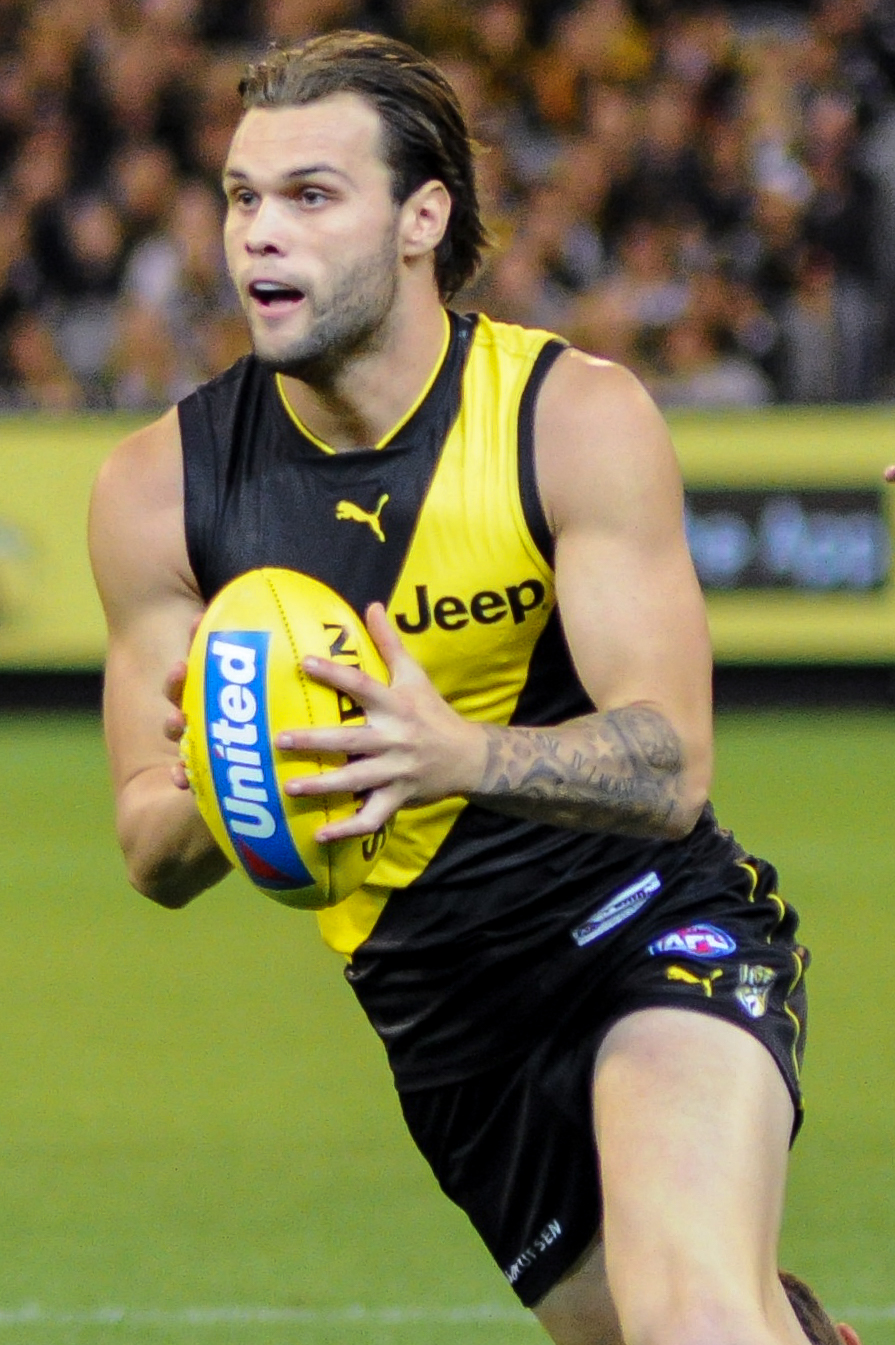
Ben Lennon in 2017

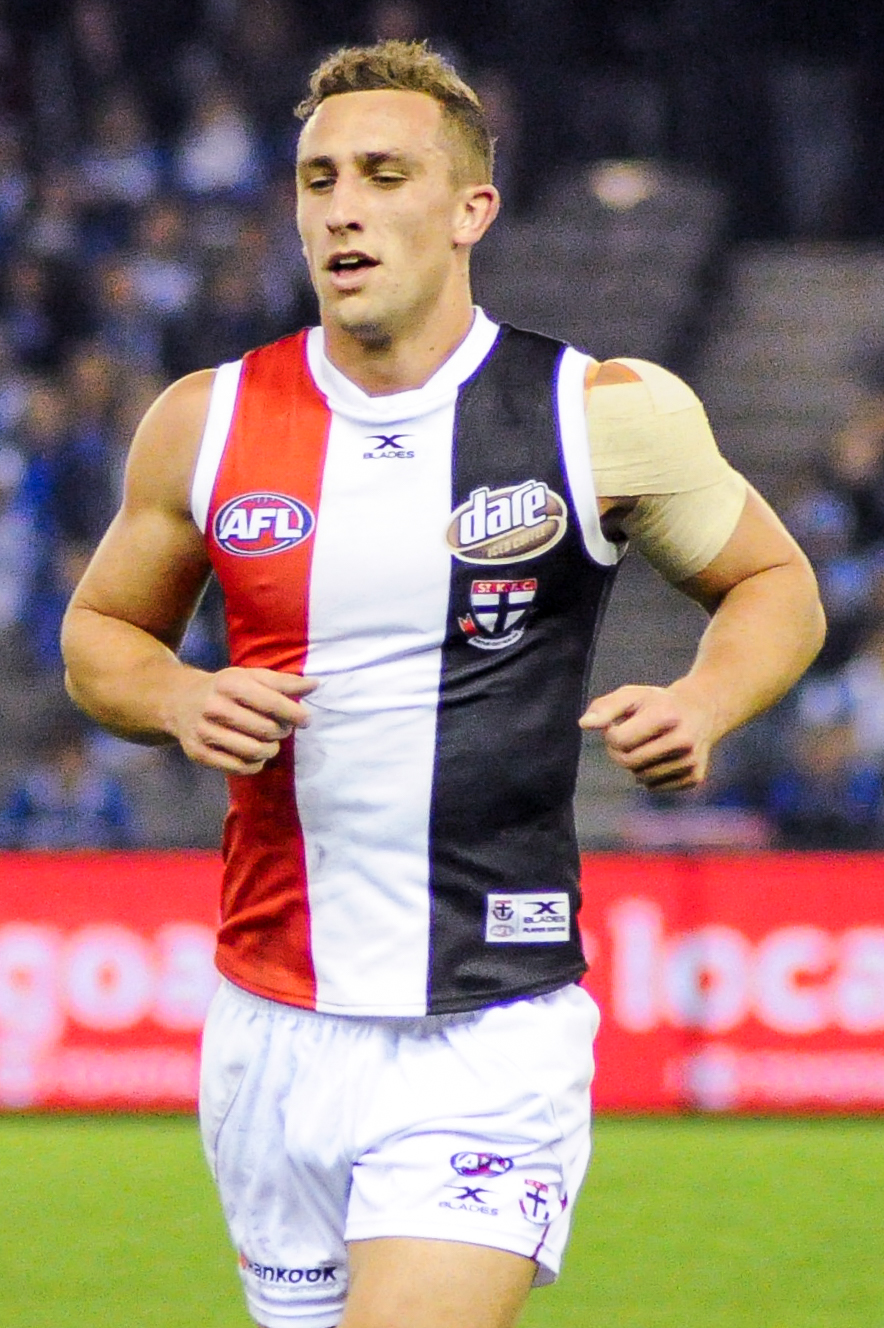
Luke Dunstan in 2017

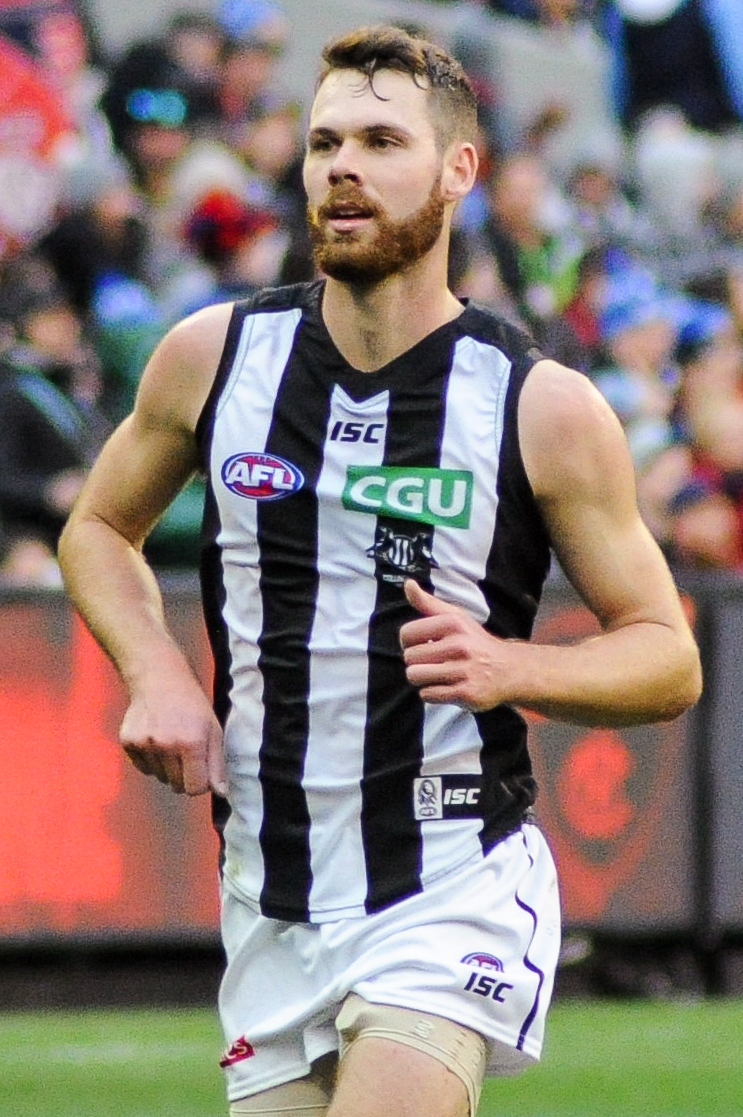
Matt Scharenberg in 2017

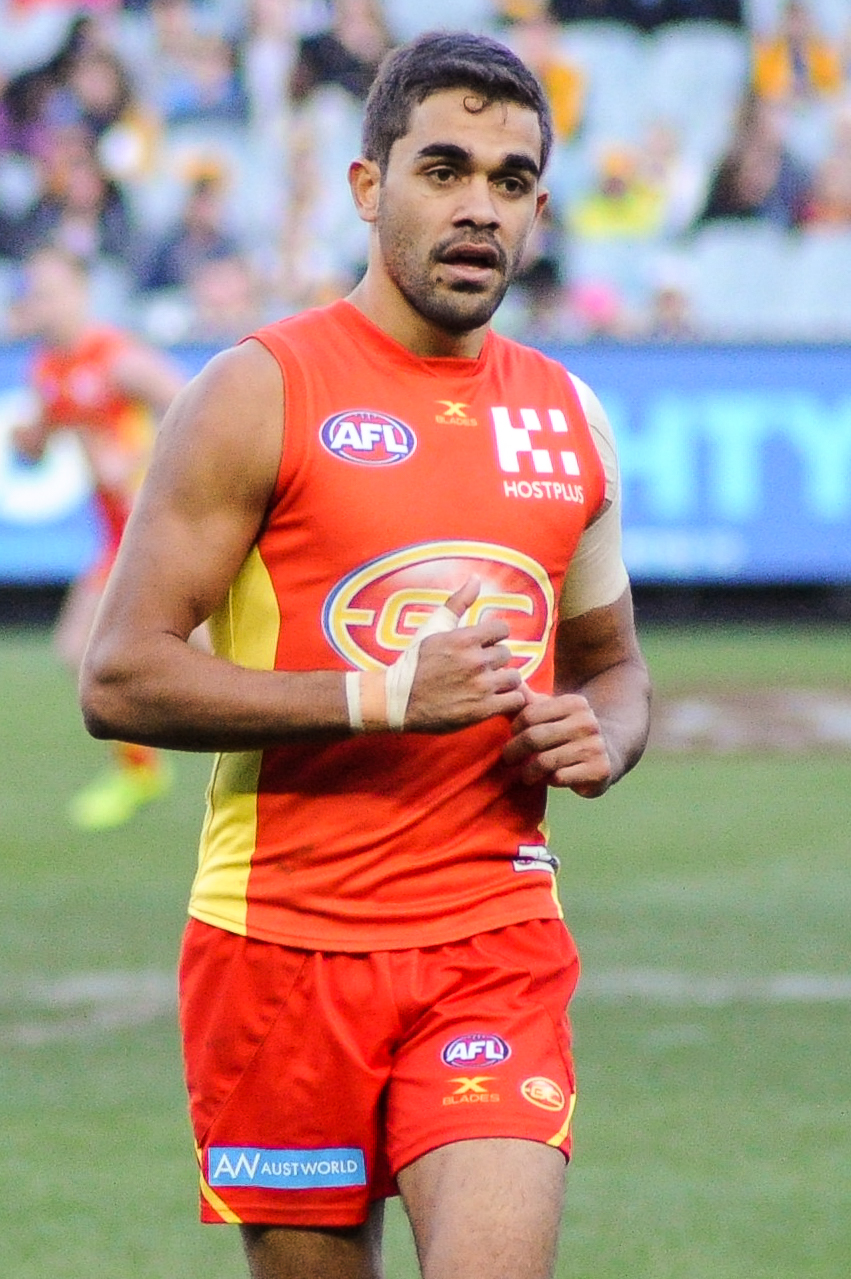
Jack Martin in 2017

=== 2010 (U17) ===
Tom Mitchell, Daniel Gorringe, Adam Treloar, Michael Bussey, Piers Flanagan, Sam Gordon, Chad Wingard, Jonathon Patton

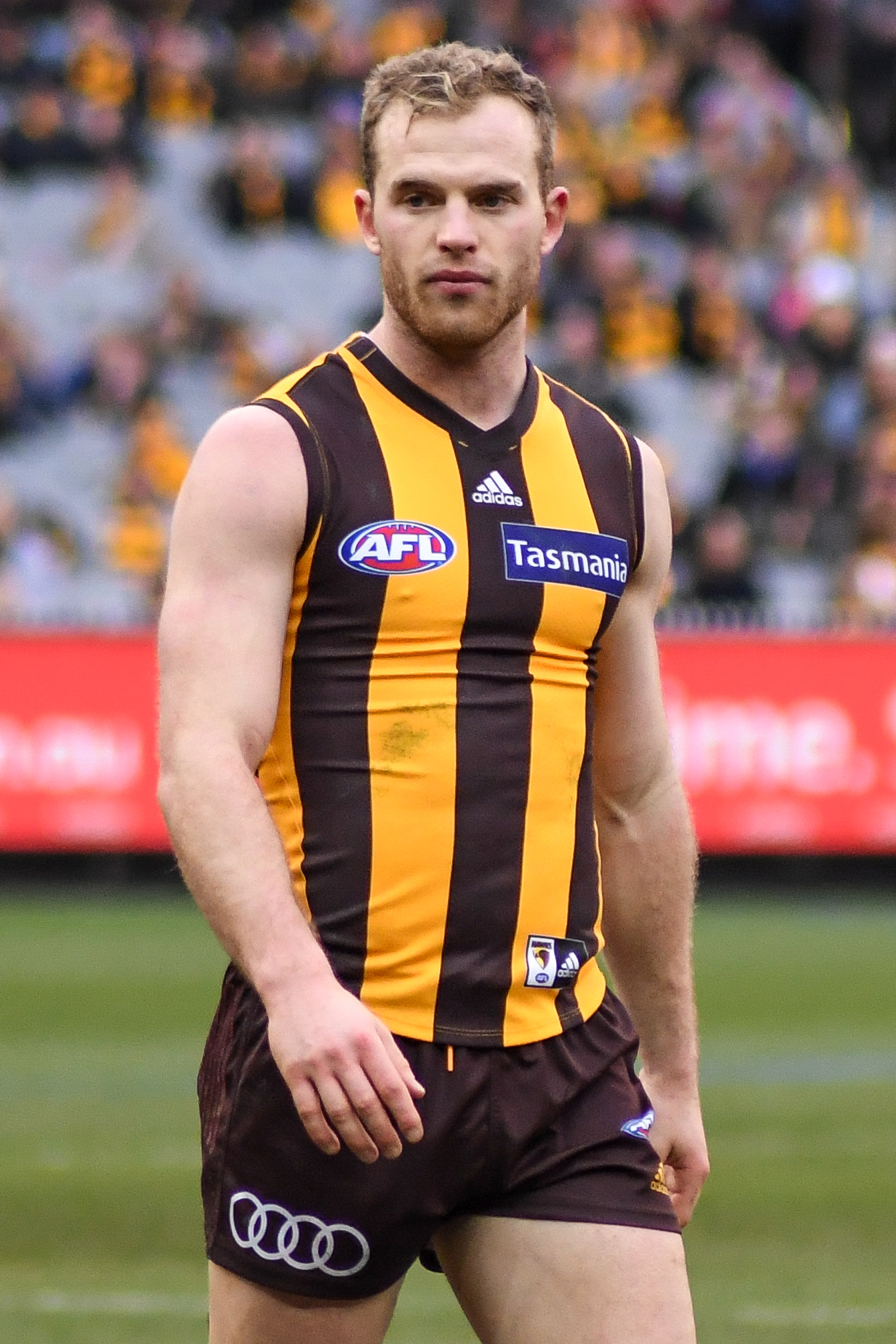
Tom Mitchell in 2018

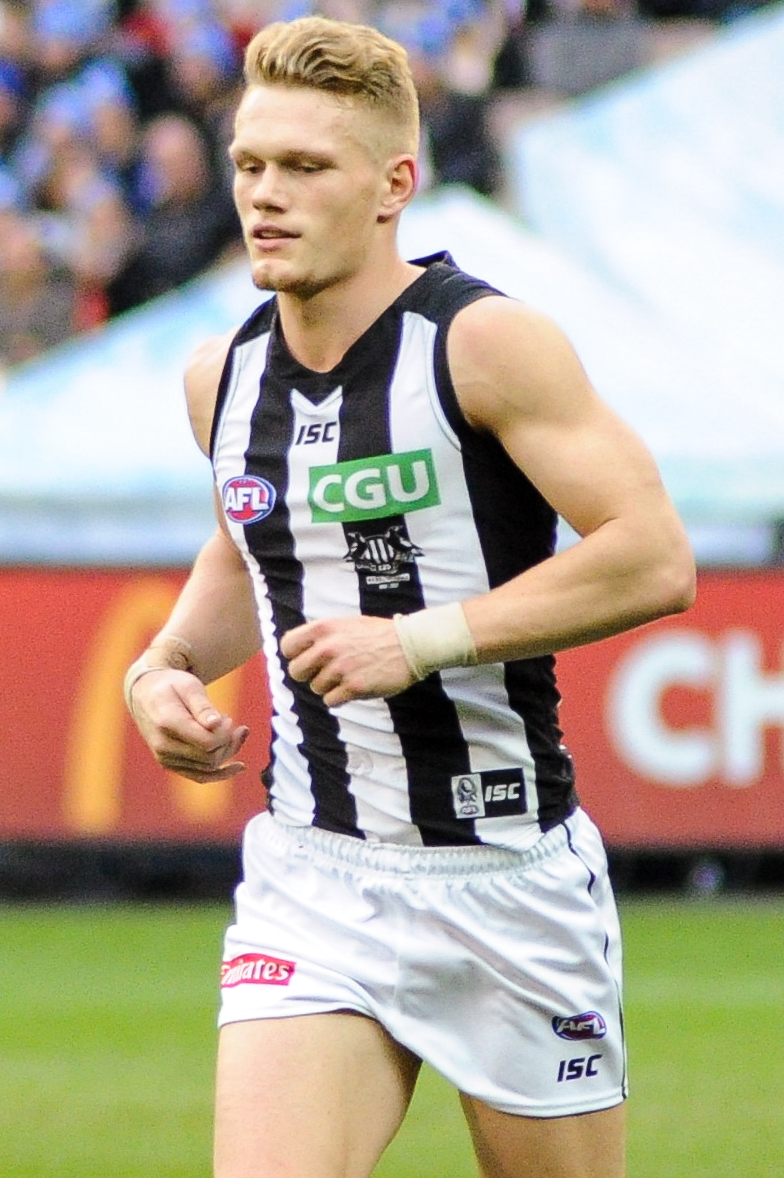
Adam Treloar in 2017

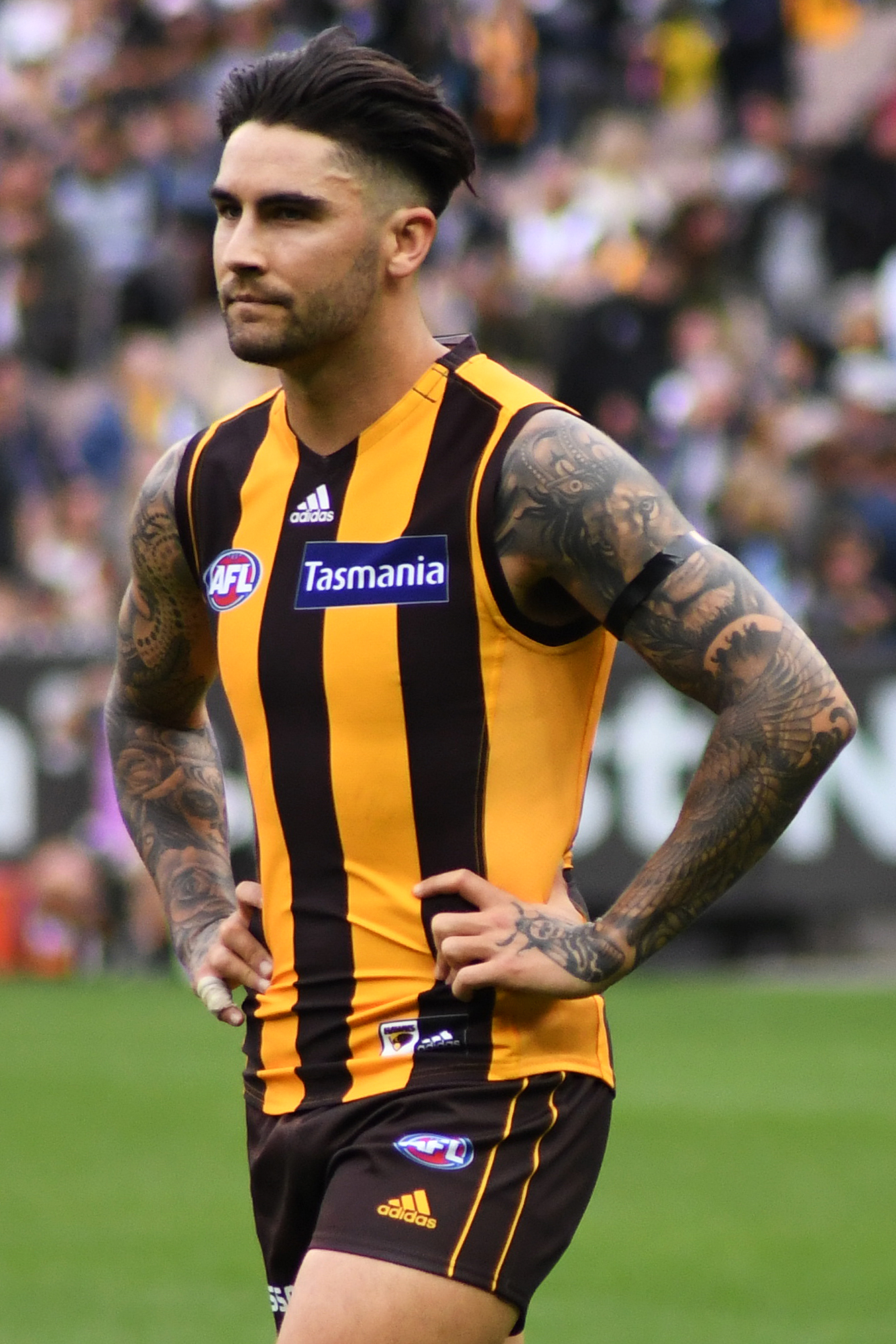
Chad Wingard in 2019

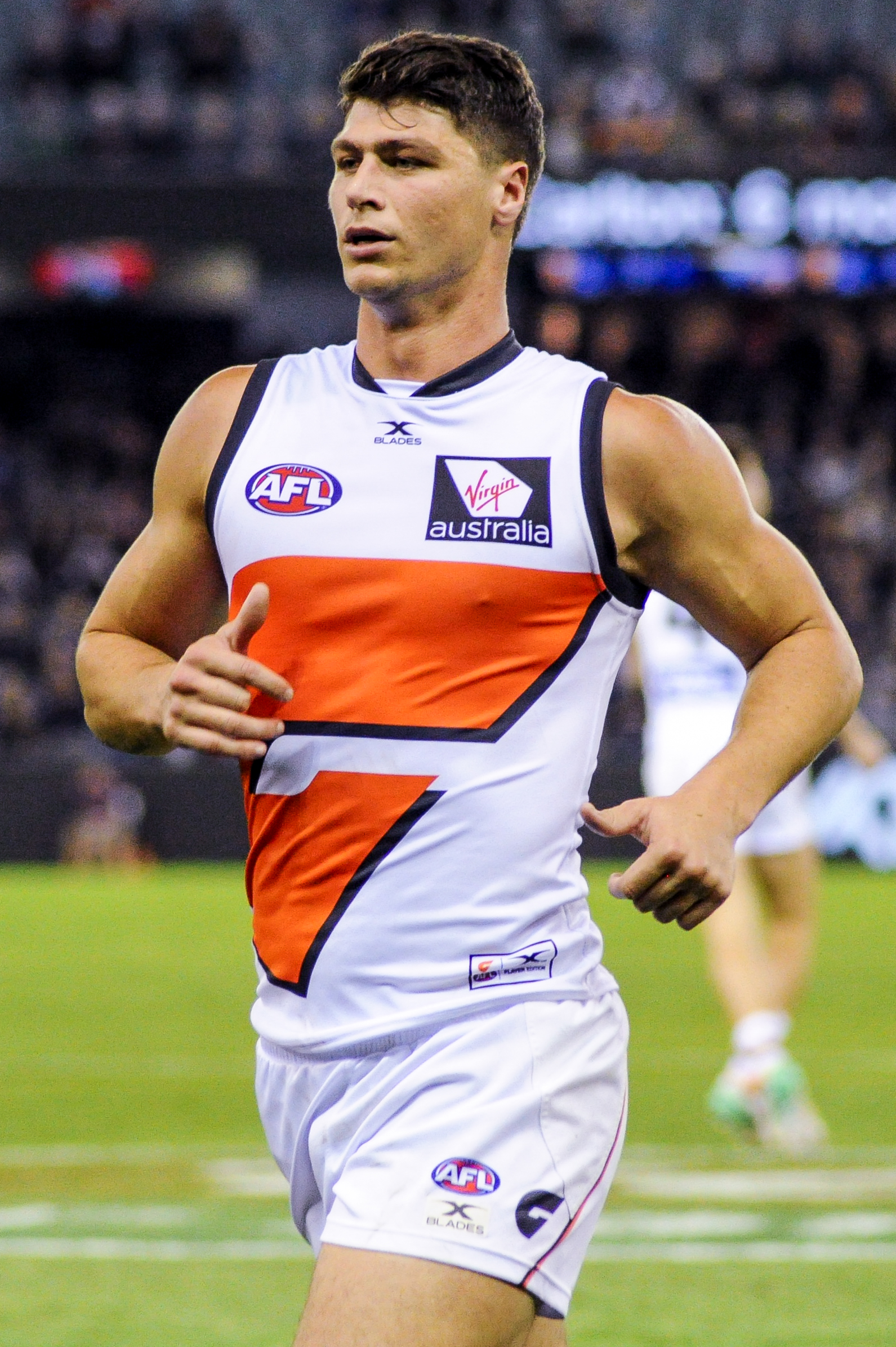
Jonathon Patton in 2017
