= Australian rules football in New Zealand =

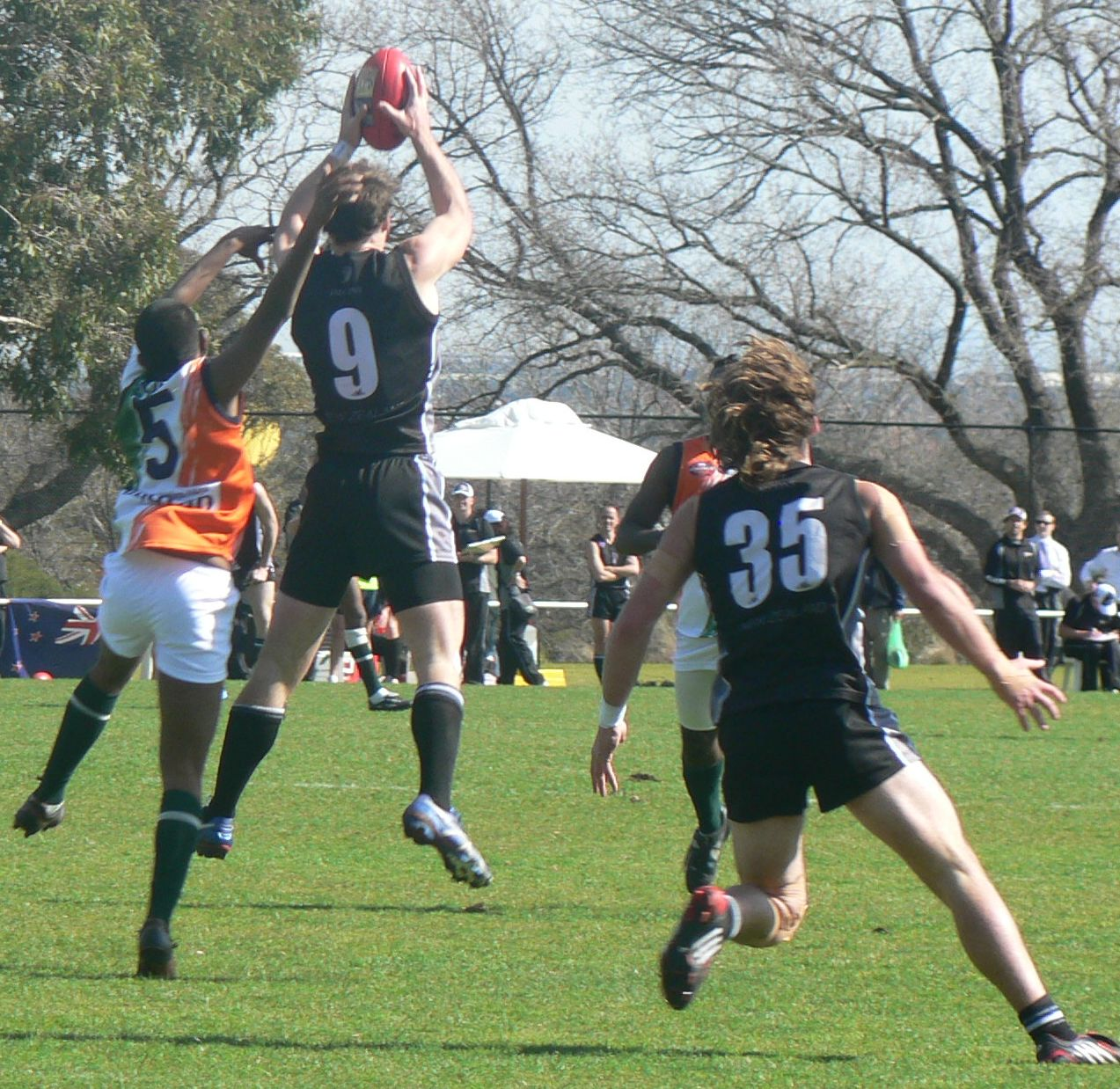
- New Zealand captain Andrew Congalton takes a mark in a 2008 International Cup match against India
- Country: New Zealand
- Governing body: New Zealand AFL
- National team: New Zealand
- First played: 1871, Wellington
- Registered players: 30,000
- Clubs: 19

Club competitions
- Auckland AFL; Canterbury AFL; Wellington AFL; Waikato AFL; Otago AFL

Audience records
- Single match: 22,546 – 2013 St Kilda vs Sydney. Westpac Stadium, Wellington

In New Zealand, Australian rules football dates back to the 1860s, was home to the first club formed outside Australia in 1876 and was the first colony outside of Australia to take up the sport. The sport's official name was changed in 1890 to Australasian Football acknowledge New Zealand's participation and remained for some time even after the country was expelled from the Australasian Football Council. After a half century hiatus of organised competition, it has grown rapidly as an amateur sport. Today five of New Zealand's sixteen regions have organised competitions: Auckland (Auckland AFL); Canterbury (Canterbury AFL); Wellington (Wellington AFL); Waikato (Waikato AFL) and Otago (Otago AFL). A four-team national competition with a national draft has been contested at the North Harbour Stadium in Auckland since 2016 for men and 2019 for women. The national team were crowned International champions at the 2005 Australian Football International Cup and competed annually against the AFL Academy between 2012 and 2019. Between the 2010s until 2022 the game was played in New Zealand schools.

The first Australian Football League match in New Zealand was played in 1991 and the first AFL premiership match played outside of Australia was the 25 April 2013 match held in Wellington. The average attendance for AFL premiership matches is 16,027. New Zealand is now considered as having the potential to host a professional team. The sport's athletes from New Zealand have become a major talent pool for both professional Australian rules and rugby football competitions and an AFL New Zealand Combine was held between 2013 and 2019.

More than 25 players have been listed by clubs in both the AFL and the AFLW since 2010, including descendants of both Māori and European New Zealanders. Wayne Schwass is the country's first AFL premiership player and with 282 matches has played more than any other New Zealand born player. Trent Croad has kicked the most goals with 189. Jesse Tawhiao-Wardlaw holds similar honours (premiership, most games and goals) in the AFLW.

== History ==
=== Beginnings ===
Before Europeans arrived in New Zealand, the Māori were playing a traditional ball game called kī-o-rahi which resembled Australian Rules Football in that included several features unique to the code including movement of the ball by hand and foot without an offside, protected zones and a rule similar to holding the ball.

Christ's College in Christchurch from 1851 was playing by "College Rules", inspired from public school football game played by the Church of England School in Oxfordshire. Though few details of the rules exists it has been claimed that from descriptions of the way it was played that it was remarkably similar to Melbourne Football Club rules. The college was later to play matches against the Christchurch Football Clubs which was also playing by similar rules.

Victorians accounted for more than half of New Zealand's gold rush immigrants, including those at Otago, Aorere and Coromandel in the 1850s and 1860s, and the associated settlements were later to exhibit influences of early Australian football.

The Christchurch Football Club, founded in 1863 and playing according to its own rules, one of which was the running bounce (every 4 yards) a feature which appeared 2 years later in Victorian rules. The club adopted rugby rules in 1876.

Australian football is thought to have been first organised in New Zealand around 1868. The Nelson Football Club was formed this year and played a hybrid version of Victorian and Association (soccer) rules in its first two seasons. By the 1860s, there was regular trade between New Zealand ports and Victoria, and the Victorian rules would have been known by some of the immigrants. The Nelson Club was the first club in New Zealand to adopt Rugby rules, in 1870.

The Wellington Football Club was formed on 12 May 1871. The club initially adopted Victorian rules, but it soon switched to Rugby rules "principally for the reason that the clubs in adjoining provinces play under those rules, and as the club contemplate playing a match with the Nelson club before long the necessity of such a course is apparent." The last match played under Victorian rules was on 24 June 1871. This was not the end of the matter, however, with the club for a short period in 1875 adding the Victorian rule of bouncing the ball. The club reverted to full Rugby rules soon thereafter.

The Dunedin Football Club, formed in 1872, initially played under its own rules. Shortly thereafter, a second club in Dunedin, the Union Club, was formed; it is thought to have adopted Victorian rules. Poor weather meant that few games were played in both the 1873 and 1874 seasons. The Dunedin Club adopted Association (soccer) rules in 1875, while the Union club retained Victorian rules. The clubs were able to compromise, and the first match between the clubs that year was played under Victorian rules on 19 June 1875. The return match was played under Association rules a few weeks later. In 1876, a hybrid match was played between the two clubs. The first half was played according to rugby rules, and the second half according to Victorian Rules. By 1877, both clubs had adopted Rugby rules.

"At the annual meeting of the Union Club in 1877 it was decided by 17 votes to five to adopt the Rugby Union Laws, the club in all its matches with the D.F.C. previous to that date having stipulated for one spell of every game being under Victorian rules."

The first games of football in Auckland were played in 1870 with the rules being a mix of Victorian and Association. In 1873, the Auckland Football Club adopted Rugby rules following a visit by two members of the Wellington Club. At the 1874 AGM of the Auckland Football Club, discussion continued around rules, with motions put to either adopt the Victorian Rules of 1866, or form a committee to consider other rules. These motions were defeated in favour of continuing with Rugby rules.

An Auckland team undertook the first inter-provincial Rugby tour in late 1875. This sparked additional interest in Rugby in regions such as Canterbury and Dunedin where several codes were being played. Ultimately, the success of this led to further representative tours, and proved to be a catalyst for Rugby to become the dominant code in the main regions.

==== 1880–1884: New Zealand Football Association ====
The Reform Football Club was formed in Wellington in 1879 to "play under the Victorian rules". In the same article, several clubs are also reported to have been formed in Dunedin as well as one in Nelson. The Reform club's first practice match was held in the Hon. J. Sheehan's paddock, Hobson St, on 5 April 1879 in front of a "considerable number of spectators". The Reform club enjoyed a reasonable amount of press coverage throughout 1879, though faded into obscurity from 1880. Another short lived club formed to play under the code in 1879 was the Victorian Football Club at a meeting at Dunedin's Southern Cross Hotel, however it too was shortlived.

The New Zealand Football Association was formed on 12 July 1880 in Christchurch. The competition continued to operate with several clubs across New Zealand until 1884. However it struggled with the New Zealand press, which was enamoured with rugby and continually derisive toward the Australian code. Although the code struggled with negativity from the media, in these early days rugby authorities were generally cooperative with access to grounds, enabling the codes to coexist.

In 1880, a proposal was put forward to send an Australasian team of players from Melbourne, Sydney and Adelaide to New Zealand and combine and tour England. Otago, one of the game's last strongholds, along with Auckland, pledged to send players for the tour. However, the only football team that set sail was the Australian (New South Wales) rugby side in 1881. This helped dispel assurances from Australasian Rules advocates that the Australasian game was fast overtaking Rugby in popularity in Sydney the reaction that year was that in its Otago stronghold 5 of the 8 clubs affiliated with the Otago Rugby Union and saw the code's popularity across the country plummet.

H C A Harrison toured Auckland in 1883 with the cricket team and met with the governing body of Rugby Union proposing that it switch to Victorian Association Rules and would be in turn raising the idea of a universal form of football with football authorities in England. New Zealand football officials also noted English officials rejection of Harrison's suggestion during his visit to London that rugby clubs there adopt some of the Victorian Rules. The fallout would lead to the continually sharp decline in the fortunes of the game locally.

The 1888-1889 New Zealand Native football team matches saw a Māori team visit Victoria, as part of a year long tour of the UK and Australia, to play a programme of Victorian Rules games. The team played eight games, winning three and losing five. It defeated South Melbourne Football Club, which at that stage was Victoria's premier club.

=== New century: Australasian rules boom ===
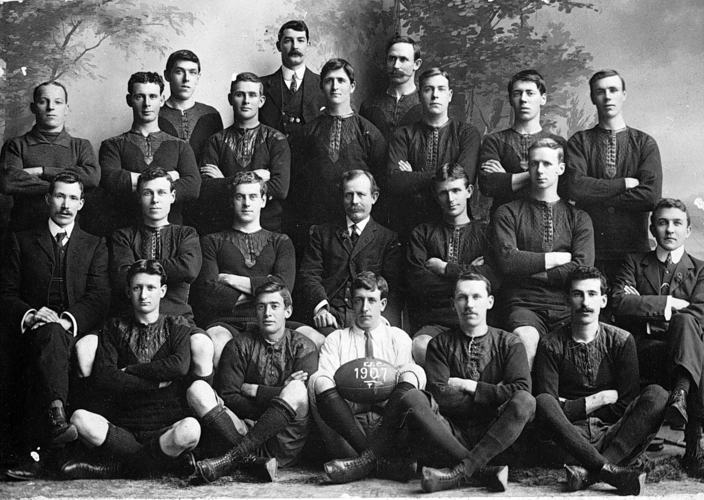
Eden Football Club. Australian Football League of Auckland premiers 1907

After being virtually nonexistent since the 1880s, interest in Australian football was rekindled on the back of a wave of immigration from Australia in the first decade of the 20th century. In 1903, the 'New Zealand Association of Australian Football' was formed in Christchurch by a committee of expat Victorians. The league had 4 clubs (City Wanderers, Sydenham, Woolston, and Imperial with a fifth, Carlton, formed a year later).

By 1904, a number of leagues were being established throughout the country. In Wellington, a league of five clubs was formed (City, Newtown, Petone, Wanderers, and Federal), and Auckland had three clubs in the new league (Auckland Imperial, Victoria, and Austral football clubs). Other centres also had clubs form in 1904, including Dunedin (Australian Pioneer Football Club), Kaitangata (Wanderers), Waihi and Waikino. Vic Cumberland who played with Auckland Imperial was something of a drawcard for the local game on his arrival from Australia.

The first inter-provincial match was held between Wellington and Christchurch in August 1905.

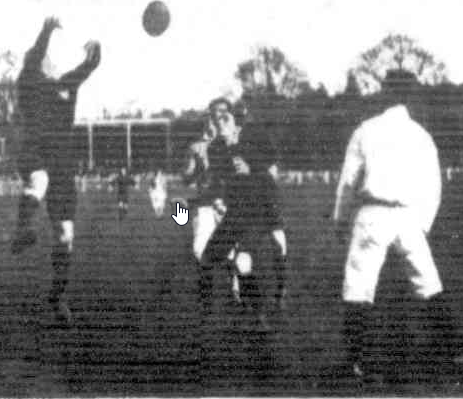
New Zealander high marking in the team's 1908 defeat of New South Wales

In 1905, two New Zealand representatives (one from the North Island and one from the South) attended the Australasian Football Conference where the Australasian Football Council was formed. The North and South Islands did not receive separate representation.

In 1906 a Canterbury vs Wellington match was played as a curtain-raiser to a rugby game which attracted 2,000 spectators. The Auckland league expanded from 1906 to feature additional clubs including the Eden Football Club (who won back-to-back Auckland Australian Football League premierships in 1907 & 1908) and a thriving junior competition. On the south island, regular matches began to be played in Invercargill. All told in 1906 there were more than 60 clubs across 8 associations including the centres of Auckland, Dunedin, Wellington, Palmerston, Christchurch and Napier.

The first national body, the New Zealand Football League, formed in 1907 at the Naval & Family Hotel in Auckland, including representatives from all provinces, which set about planning for the Australian tour, noting the rapidly growing popularity of the code across the country. At the meeting, the NZFL adopted a national code of laws and elected its first president Dr Tracy Inglis.

However the Australasian Football Council president Con Hickey in 1907 was quick to pour cold water on the game's growth in New Zealand, declaring that despite the game being played overseas the primary focus should be on developing the game in Australia, promoting inter-state competition, and that there would be no attempt to "oust rugby" in places where it was growing in popularity.

Wellington defeated Canterbury in a match between the two provinces in July 1907.

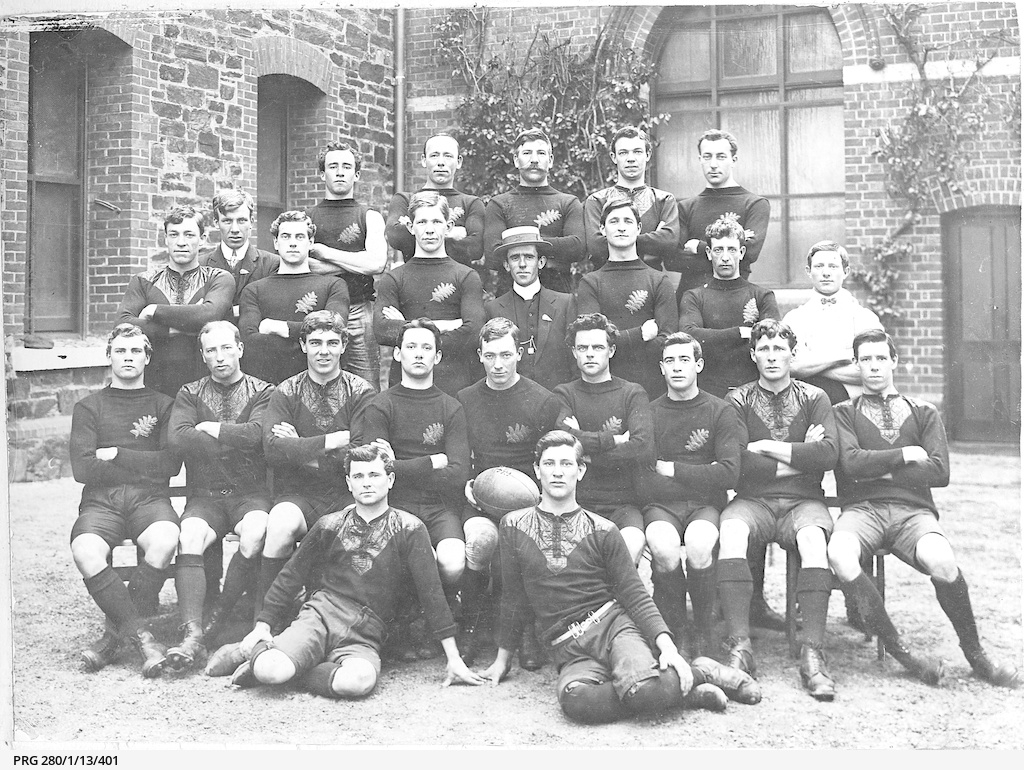
The New Zealand team that played against South Australian state football team on the Adelaide Oval on 1 September 1908

In 1908, New Zealand defeated both New South Wales and Queensland at the Jubilee Australasian Football Carnival an event held in Melbourne, at the Melbourne Cricket Ground, to celebrate 50 years of Australian Football. Despite the country's onfield success, the Australasian Football Council decided to allocate just 20% of its game promotion fund to New Zealand, with the majority going to New South Wales (50%) and Queensland (30%).

By 1909, the game was rapidly growing had become established in Auckland, Waihi, Poverty Bay, Canterbury, Otago, Taihape and Utiki and moves were being made to establish a league in the Southland at Invercargill.

=== 1910s: Decline and AFC exclusion campaign ===
Many of the leagues went into rapid decline around the end of the decade. This was partly due to the departure of a number of the Australian players back home, but also due to rising conflict with rugby authorities. Leagues were beginning to encounter interference from rugby, the Wellington League of Australian Football for example was denied access to its primary venue the Basin Reserve from 1908 and lack of suitable venues led to it folding and leagues around the country faced similar challenges. However the biggest challenge came from within the game itself.

Since the inception of the AFC Victoria (VFL) and South Australia (SAFL) had been pushing for support for the game overseas to be wound up. Both leagues were invested in protecting their primacy and advocated for the redirection of funds proposed for other nations to New South Wales and Queensland in an effort to instead nationalise the game in Australia. With only one voting member, New Zealand was powerless to defend its position. New Zealand's AFC delegate, E. L. McKeon, in 1908 with the support of AFC president Con Hickey (Victoria), had begun promoting the idea of universal football (amalgamation with rugby league) as the solution to help stave off increased competition to rugby. South Australia's delegate R. F. C Sullivan, strongly in support of the pure Australian Football again moved to exclude New Zealand from the council in 1910 and while the motion was defeated the chair Hickey (Victoria) passed a motion that would withdraw all funding to senior competition, a move which the New Zealand delegate called a "death warrant for the sport" in the country. In 1911, the Council decided to reduce New Zealand's funding to £50 (compared to £225 for New South Wales and for £125 for Queensland) and only on the condition that all of it be spent on juniors (no such restrictions were placed on the Australian member states). The AFC was adamant that its funds be used only to introduce the code into New Zealand schools. New Zealand's delegate had strongly argued that without a viable senior competition schools would simply not take up the game, ultimately this proved true.

The AFC's withdrawal of funding had a detrimental impact with almost all of the senior competitions folding within a year. The last of them, the Auckland competition, folded in 1912 with clubs unable to field sufficient players, and only the junior competition continuing. When New Zealand failed to provide the AFC details on how its 1912 propaganda funds were spent, no subsequent funds were provided in 1913 causing the junior competitions also to fold.

=== Rugby league "takeover" in Australia and the effect of World War I ===
The impact of rugby league's expansion was also significant in the sport's complete demise. Rugby league in New Zealand grew rapidly from 1908 and by 1910 many senior players had begun to shift to the new code. Since the early introduction of both codes, New Zealand media regularly took greater interest in interstate contests across all codes between New South Wales and Queensland, particularly in comparing the popularity and progress of rugby football. Though New Zealand teams had toured Australia, due to AFC policy, no Australian Rules teams ever visited New Zealand. When the New South Wales rugby league team toured in 1912, the focus on Australian Rugby League generated the perception of a decline in prominence of the Australian game in Australia, There was an awareness in the growing gap between New South Wales and Queensland, and the closing financial gap between the Sydney and Melbourne professional competitions, with league offering better paying opportunities for players.

By the outbreak of World War I, the code was in serious trouble with many of the remaining players leaving for active service. The war was not all doom for the code however, the formation of the Australian and New Zealand Army Corps had a positive effect. In Auckland, 8 clubs reformed at the start of the war with some promising growth prior to the major campaigns.

With the rising popularity of rugby league, the Australasian Football Council ramped up its plans to amalgamate with rugby league in an attempt to stay relevant amid a decline in interest. However this played right into the rugby league's hands. Australian rugby league authorities pulled out of the plan, and the rugby community in New Zealand used the plan to its own advantage. Erroneous media reports were widely circulated across New Zealand in 1914 declaring the proposed amalgamation to a planned takeover bid by the rugby league that would effectively supplant Australian football as Australia's national football code. It was also reported that the Australian national team to tour New Zealand would be playing the new National Rugby League code. By the time that the proposed takeover was no longer being reported as a "sure thing" the confusion caused had already been done to the confidence of the code locally, already on hold everywhere but Auckland due to the war. The new focus was on sending a Rugby league team to compete against the National League professionals from Australia with matches to be played in Sydney and Brisbane in June 1915. The belief that Australian rules in Australia was dying was fuelled by reports that the replacement of what was Australian Rules would be played as a curtain-raiser to the big match. Adding to the view that the Australian code would not survive the war, the South Australian Football League's ceasing of its competition in 1916 was also widely reported. With the return of the code in Australia and the failure of the NZ league tour, some had regretted putting the focus on sending a League team to tour Australia with most commentators generally agreeing that despite the hype from Sydney, that Union offered a superior spectacle to League.

=== 1914: Expulsion from Australasian Football Council ===
Tensions between the Australian delegates and New Zealand became acrimonious and in 1914 after a lengthy debate and 89 page report on the state of the game and the use of propaganda funds the council again moved to exclude New Zealand. The time it was unanimously passed by the council and New Zealand was permanently expelled. The council removed the reference to Australasia.

=== Post-war efforts ===
Nevertheless, some efforts were made to rekindle interest in the code during these years. For instance, in 1930 a call was put out through The Sporting Globe for Australians in New Zealand to restart the sport there. An opinion piece in The Argus in Melbourne's 1935 also proposed that the Australian Football Council might be remiss not to put some effort into promoting the game there.

In 1961, the Melbourne Football Club toured New Zealand during its off season, becoming the first VFL/AFL club to do so.

In 1965 Sydney club Western Suburbs Magpies AFC toured New Zealand and played an exhibition match in Auckland which attracted more than 700 spectators, prompting calls for a local club to compete against visiting sides.

=== Modern competition, audience ===
In 1974, senior competitions began in Christchurch (The Canterbury Australian Rules Football Association), Auckland (Auckland Australian Football League) and Wellington.

In 1978 New Zealand sent a representative team to play against a representative test against the South West Gippsland Football Association. This was the earliest recorded overseas match of the national team.

In 1980, the game's premier league at the time, the VFL, sold its first ever television broadcasting rights to New Zealand, with highlight packages with the Grand Final going live into the country. By 1984, the finals series was also televised.

The Australian Rules Football Council of New Zealand formed in the early 1980s and began requesting representative matches against the Australian Capital Territory as early as 1983. However it was not invited to any national carnivals until the 1990s.

In 1996, the Australian Defence Force side visited New Zealand to conduct clinics and promote the game.

The Arafura Games gave the side the first opportunity for the newly branded Falcons to compete at an international level. In 1995, 1997 and 1999, New Zealand took the silver medal in Australian Football at the event in Darwin, Northern Territory, running second to Papua New Guinea.

In 1997, the New Zealand Australian Football Development Foundation (NZAFDF) was formed.

1998 saw the debut of New Zealand-born Trent Croad into the Australian Football League, the beginnings of what is a successful career at elite level.

In 1999, NZAFDF incorporated as governing body and was renamed New Zealand AFL.

=== Exhibition matches ===
The years of 1991, 1998, 2000 and 2001 saw official Australian Football League exhibition matches staged in New Zealand so that the AFL could gauge local support.

| Date/year | Location | Stadium | Teams | Crowd | Media |
|---|---|---|---|---|---|
| 5 October 1991 | Auckland | Western Springs Stadium | Geelong v. St Kilda | 8,500 | Video on YouTube |
| 1 March 1998 | Wellington | Basin Reserve | Melbourne v. Sydney | 7,820 | |
| 29 January 2000 | Wellington | Westpac Stadium | Western Bulldogs v. Hawthorn | 11,666 | |
| 2001 | Wellington | Westpac Stadium | Brisbane Lions v. Adelaide | 7,500 | |

=== International success ===
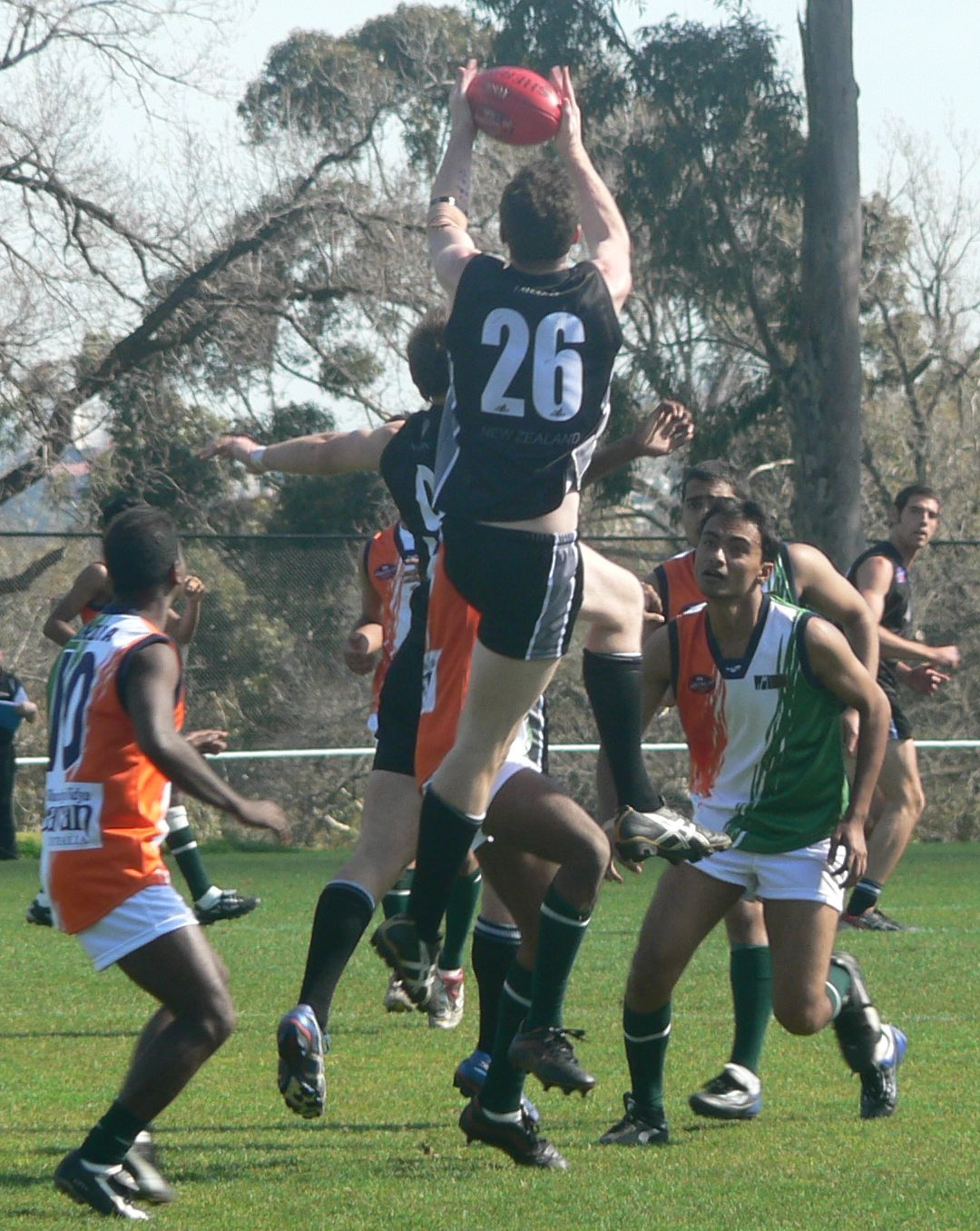
Richard Bradley takes a spectacular mark against India in the 2008 International Cup

In the inaugural Australian Football International Cup in 2002, New Zealand finished 3rd.

In 2003, local Aussie Rules convert Nick Evans debuted for the famous All Blacks rugby union side against England.

Since 2004, there have been talks of a New Zealand Australian Football League franchise or club relocation as a possible expansion plan for the league. New Zealand fields teams in several Australian competitions in other football codes including the National Rugby League and A-League.

The country came to be regarded as an Australian state by the Australian Football League's international development department.

2005 was a huge year for Australian Football in New Zealand. The national team, the Falcons defeated Papua New Guinea to win the International Cup and were later invited to send a team to the Australian Country Championships.

2006 saw the first-ever live regular season AFL matches on television, which were shown by SKY Network Television.

In November 2008, 17-year-old Liam Ackland was invited to the AIS/AFL academy.

The Hawthorn Football Club, which had been involved in New Zealand since about 2004 and at one point in 2009 had 3 players from New Zealand on its senior list, stepped up its involvement in 2009 with development funding to set up a school competition, the "Hawks Cup", for recruiting and talent identification. The sport boomed at junior levels after approved by the New Zealand Secondary Sports Council. Kurt Heatherley of Tauranga accepted an AFL scholarship in 2010.

2016 saw the successful introduction of a high-level four-team national competition, featuring a national draft with games played out of North Harbour stadium.

In 2021 All Blacks Will Jordan expressed an interest in trialling with an AFL club, describing it as "a cool game to watch", Jordie Barrett admitted he's a fan, describing it as a "cool sport".

According to New Zealand's national sports census in 2023, the sport does not make the top 86 sports by participation and ceased being played in schools in 2022.

== Participation ==
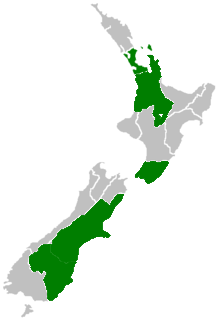
Map of New Zealand showing regions where Australian rules football in 2007 was organised in green

The last reported participation figures were from 2021 after the programs were severely impacted by the COVID-19 pandemic. According to KiwiKick, the game was introduced to were 4,557 children, down by over 20,000.

In 2007 New Zealand had around 600 senior players. In 2010, the AFL hoped to increase registered secondary school participants with the introduction of in-school programs. This introduction was highly successful and at the end of 2012, 25,000 Kiwikick participants had been recorded.

By 2010 the number of registered participants had increased to 35,000.

== Leagues and competitions ==
| Competition | Commenced | Clubs | National Provincial Championship (NPC) side |
|---|---|---|---|
| Auckland | 1974 | 6 | Auckland Buccaneers |
| Canterbury | 1974 | 4 | Canterbury Cobras |
| Wellington | 1974 | 4 | Wellington Tigers |
| Waikato | 2004 | 3 | Waikato Thunder |
| Otago | 2018 | 2 | Otago Riot |

== National team ==
The national men's team is known as the Falcons. Up to 1908 it was known as the "All Blacks" or the "Silver Ferns" like their rugby counterparts. When the team was reformed it adopted the moniker of the Falcons in 1995. In 2018, a poll was held by AFL New Zealand to rename the side the Hawks. In 2021 another was held by AFL New Zealand to rename back to the Falcons.

The team intercolonial tests were for the 1908 tour to Australia, when it competed in the Jubilee Australasian Football Carnival and travelled throughout Australia playing regional sides. However the team was dormant for three quarters of a century until the first internationals at the Arafura Games where they were Silver medallists in 1995 and 1997. The side has competed internationally since the inaugural Australian Football International Cup in 2002, and was crowned International champions in 2005.

A national women's side, the New Zealand Kahu, began as an under 18 national team in 2015 before representing women's senior football in 2019 with the aim of debuting internationally for the Australian Football International Cup women's division.

== AFL games ==
AFL club St Kilda signed a historic agreement with, the AFL and Wellington City Council, the Saints will play in New Zealand on Anzac Day each year from 2013 through 2015. They play for the Simpson-Henderson Trophy.

| Round/date | Host | Score | Guest | Score | Winner and margin | Venue | Attendance | Media |
|---|---|---|---|---|---|---|---|---|
| 25 April 2013 | St Kilda | 9.9 (63) | Sydney | 11.13 (79) | Sydney by 16 points | Westpac Stadium, Wellington | 22,546 | Video on YouTube |
| 25 April 2014 | St Kilda | 11.13 (79) | Brisbane Lions | 12.10 (82) | Brisbane by 3 points | Westpac Stadium, Wellington | 13,409 | Video on YouTube |
| April 25, 2015 | St Kilda | 12.9 (81) | Carlton | 18.13 (121) | Carlton by 40 Points | Westpac Stadium, Wellington | 12,125 | Video on YouTube |

Source: Footy Wire

== Principal venues ==
| Wellington | Auckland |
|---|---|
| Wellington Regional Stadium (AFL standard) | Outer Oval, North Harbour Stadium |
| Capacity: 34,500 | Capacity: 5,000 |

== Audience ==
=== Attendance ===
The record attendance for an Australian rules game in New Zealand is 22,546 which was set in 2013 between St Kilda vs Sydney at Westpac Stadium in Wellington. The average attendance for AFL premiership matches played in New Zealand is 16,027.

=== Television ===
- SKY Network Television (one delayed AFL match per week and Highlights)
- Sommet Sports (six live games each week, the remaining matches broadcast on delayed coverage)
- TVNZ Duke

== Players ==
=== Men's ===
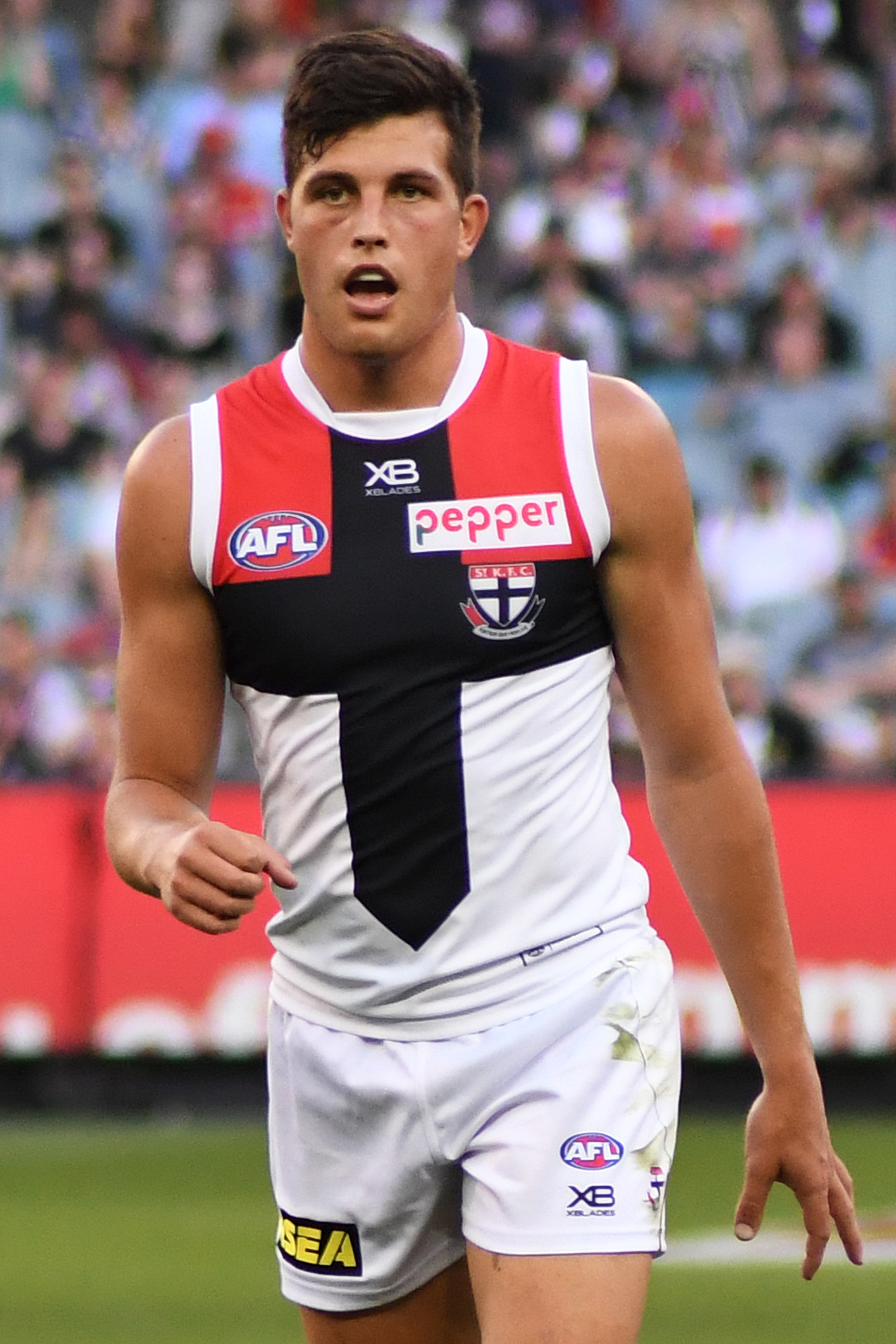
Rowan Marshall is from Taranaki

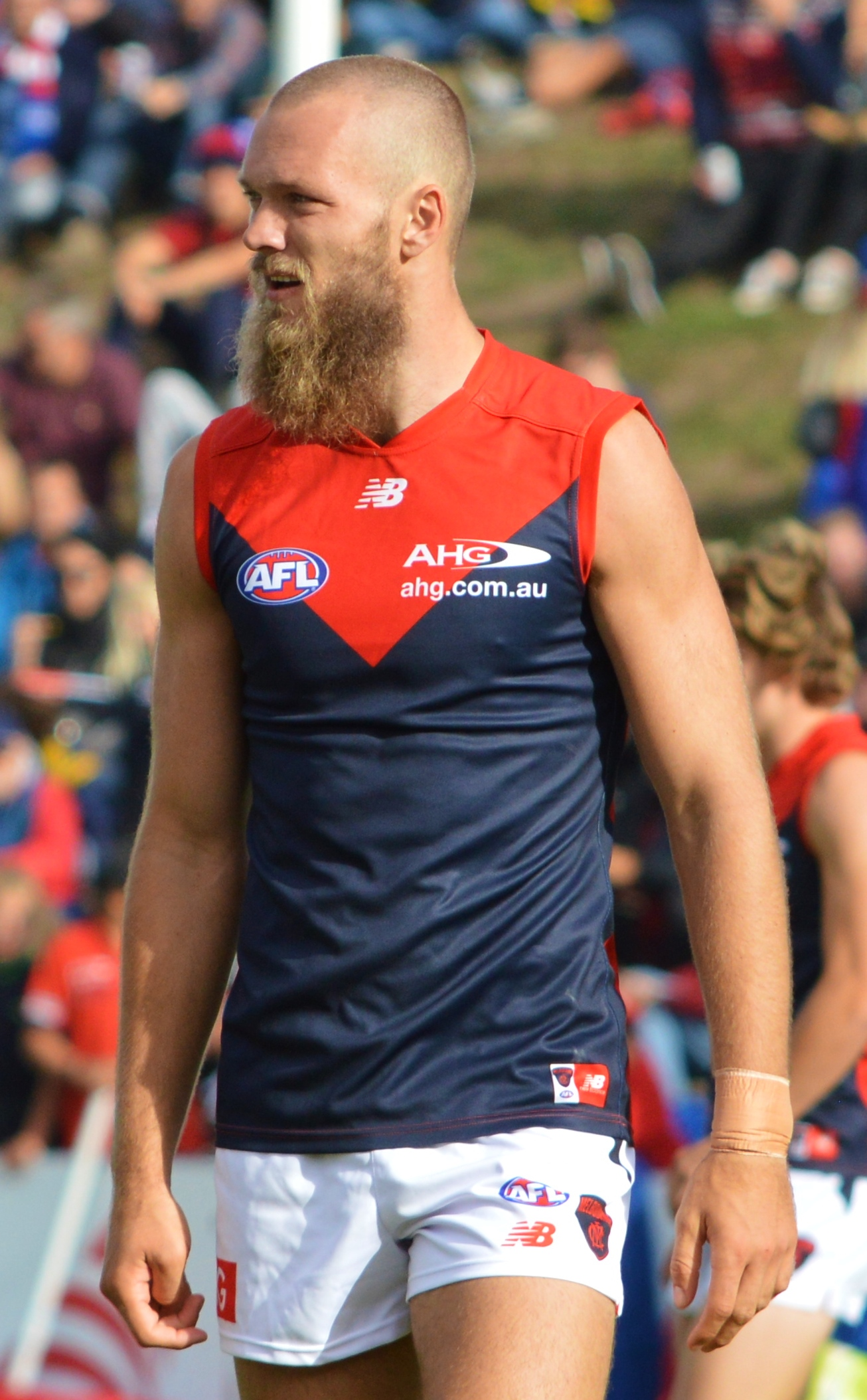
Max Gawn is from Greymouth

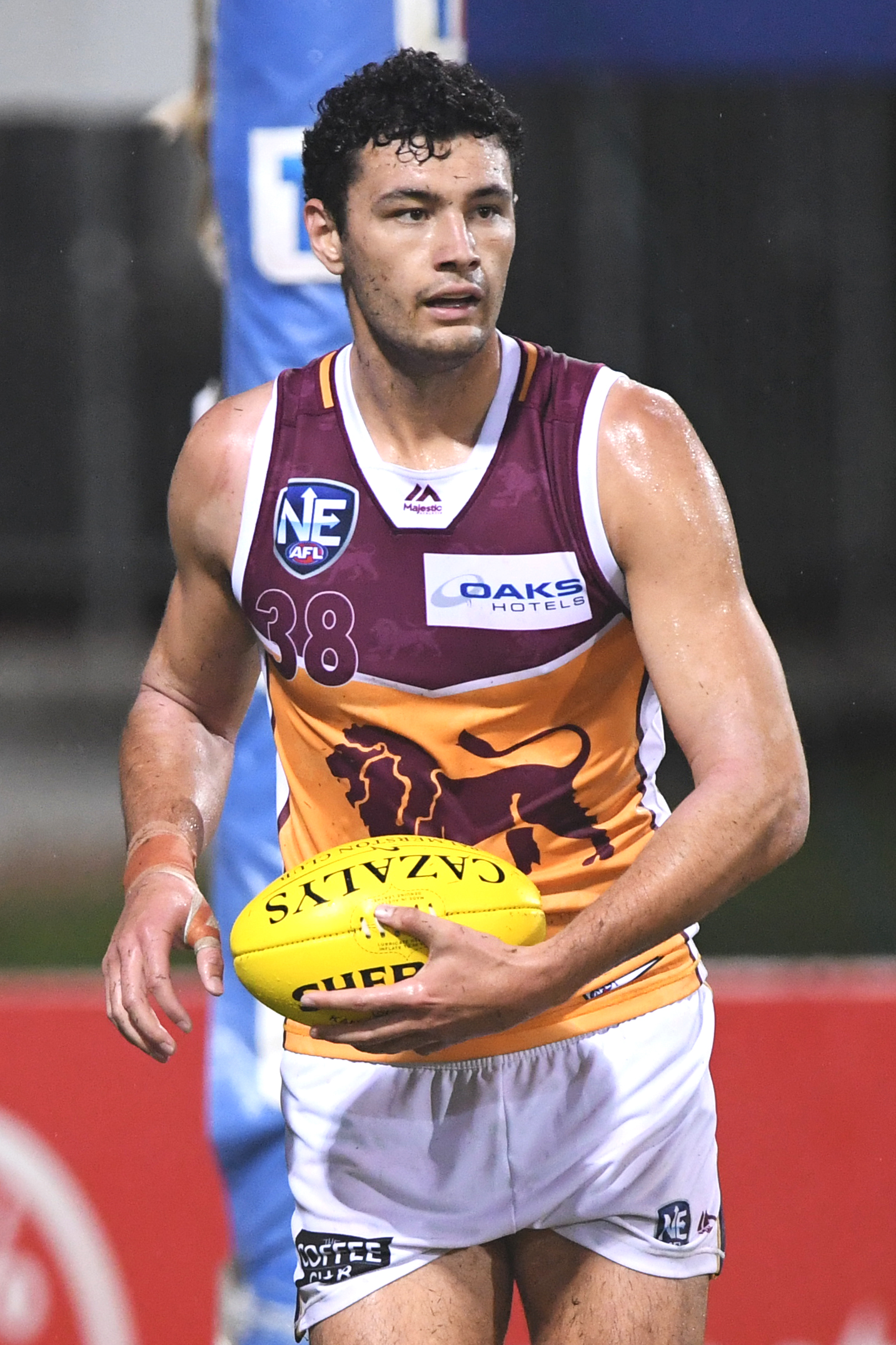
Connor Ballenden is from Auckland

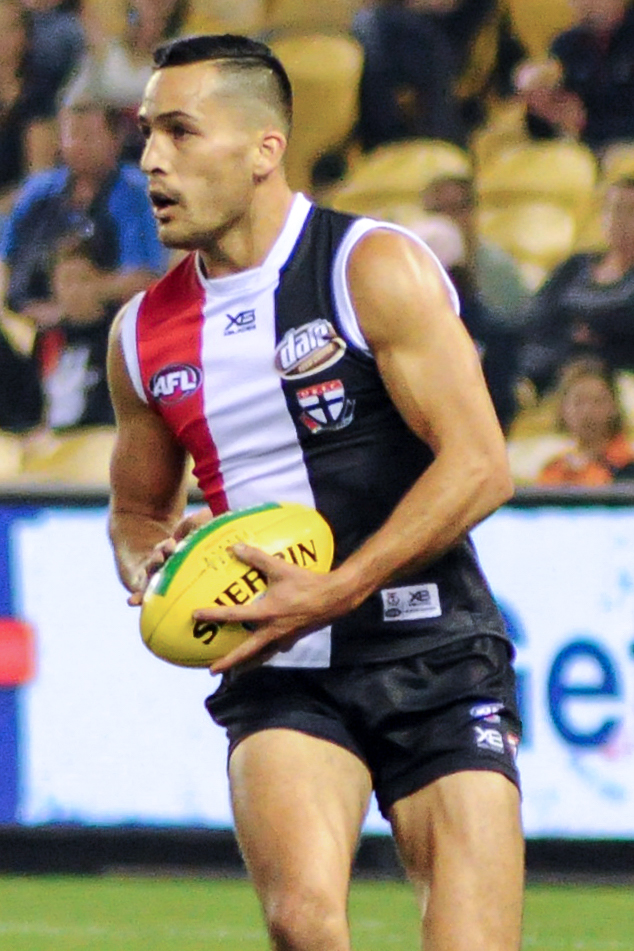
Shane Savage is from Auckland

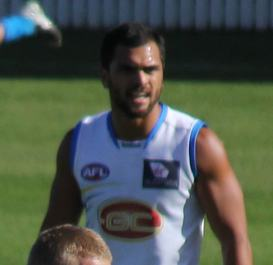
Karmichael Hunt is from Auckland

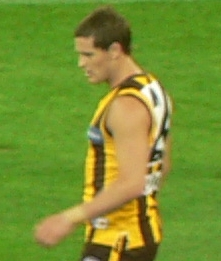
Trent Croad is from Auckland

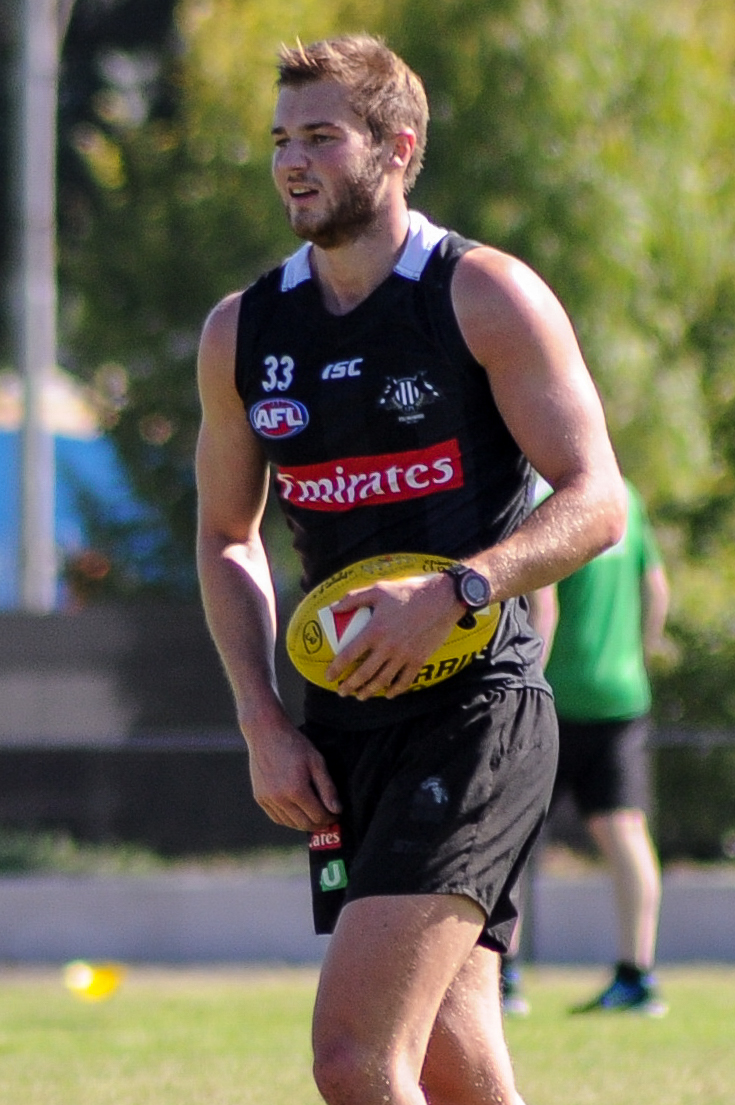
Rupert Wills playing for Collingwood in 2017

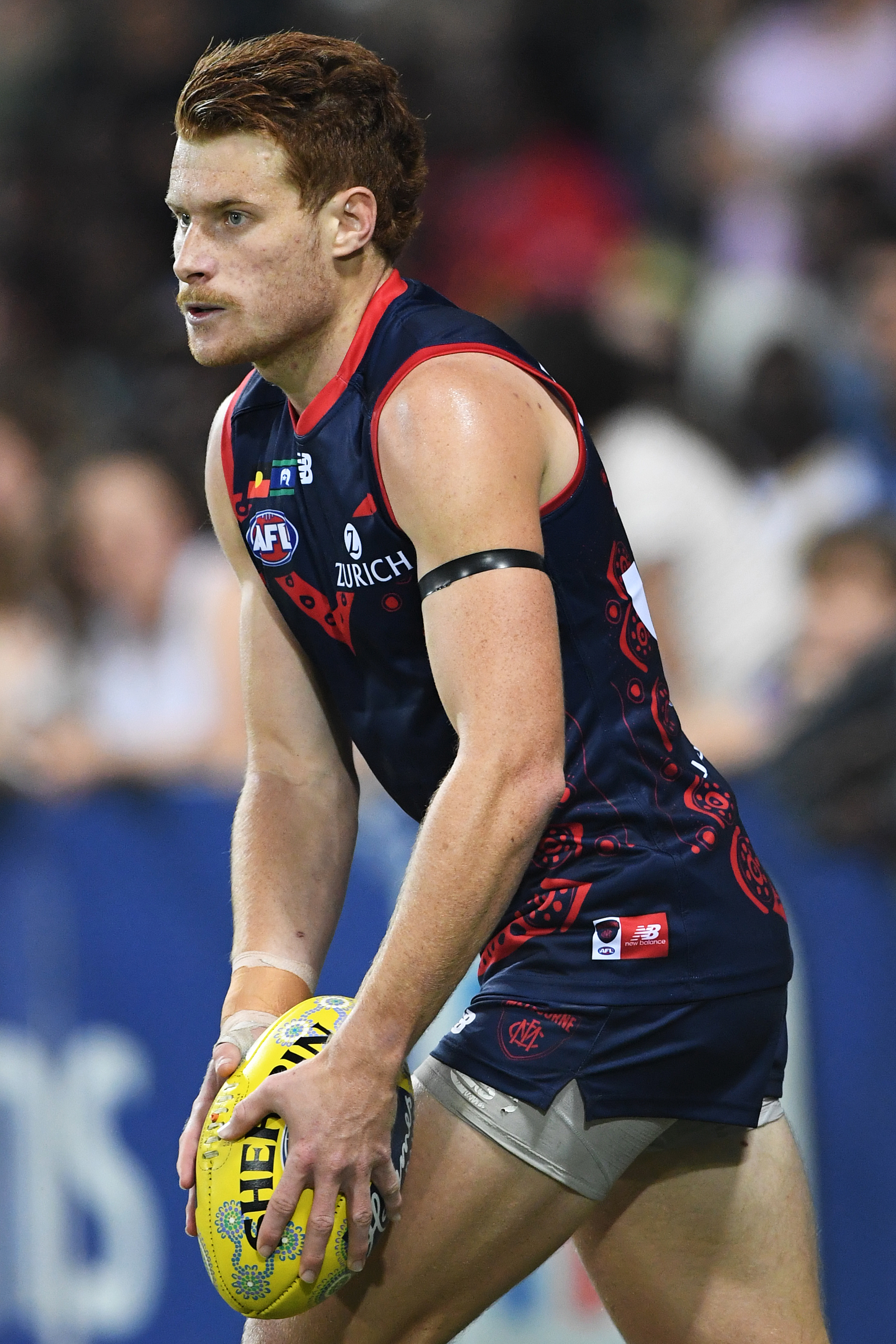
Oskar Baker playing for Melbourne in 2019

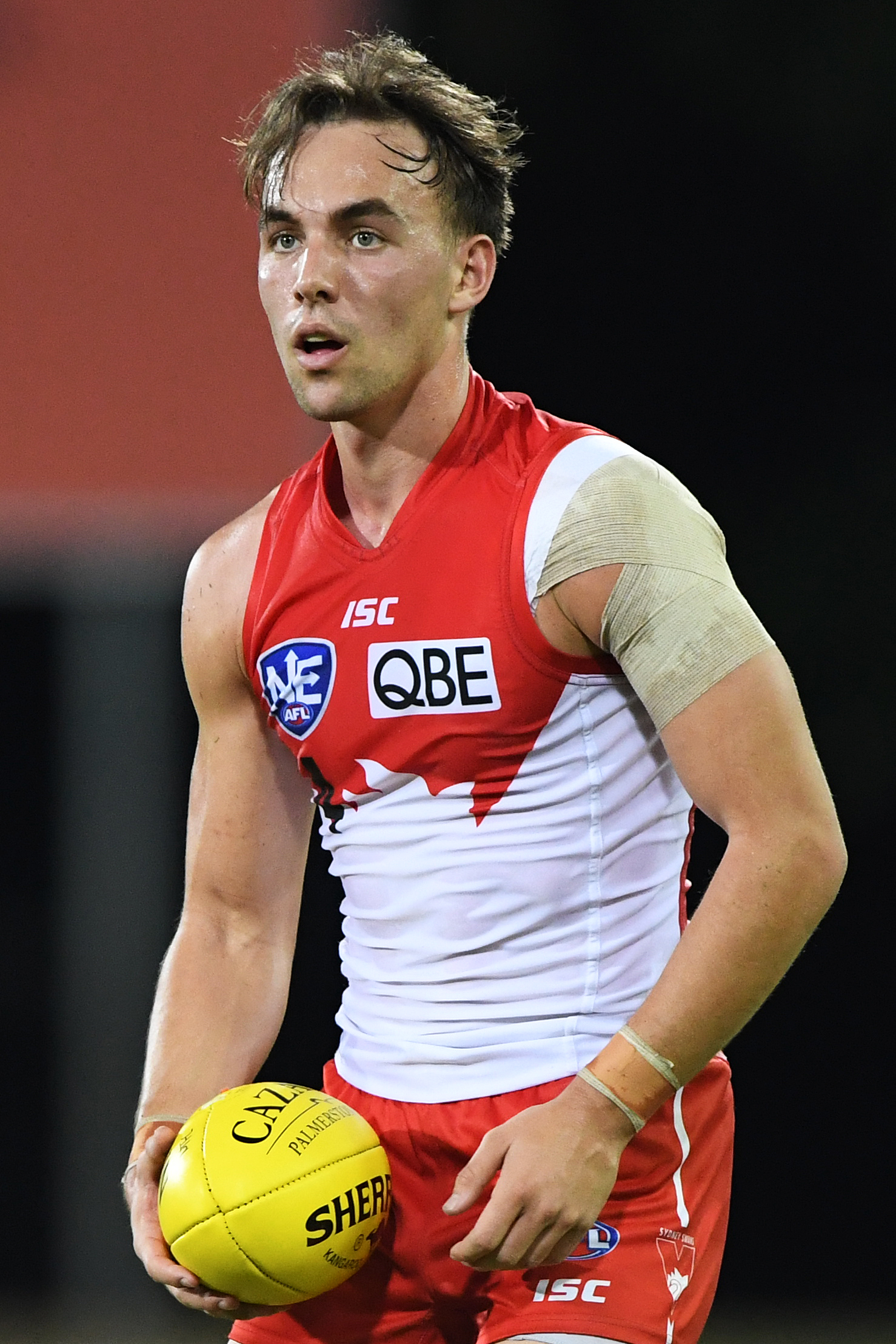
Ryan Clarke playing for Sydney in 2019

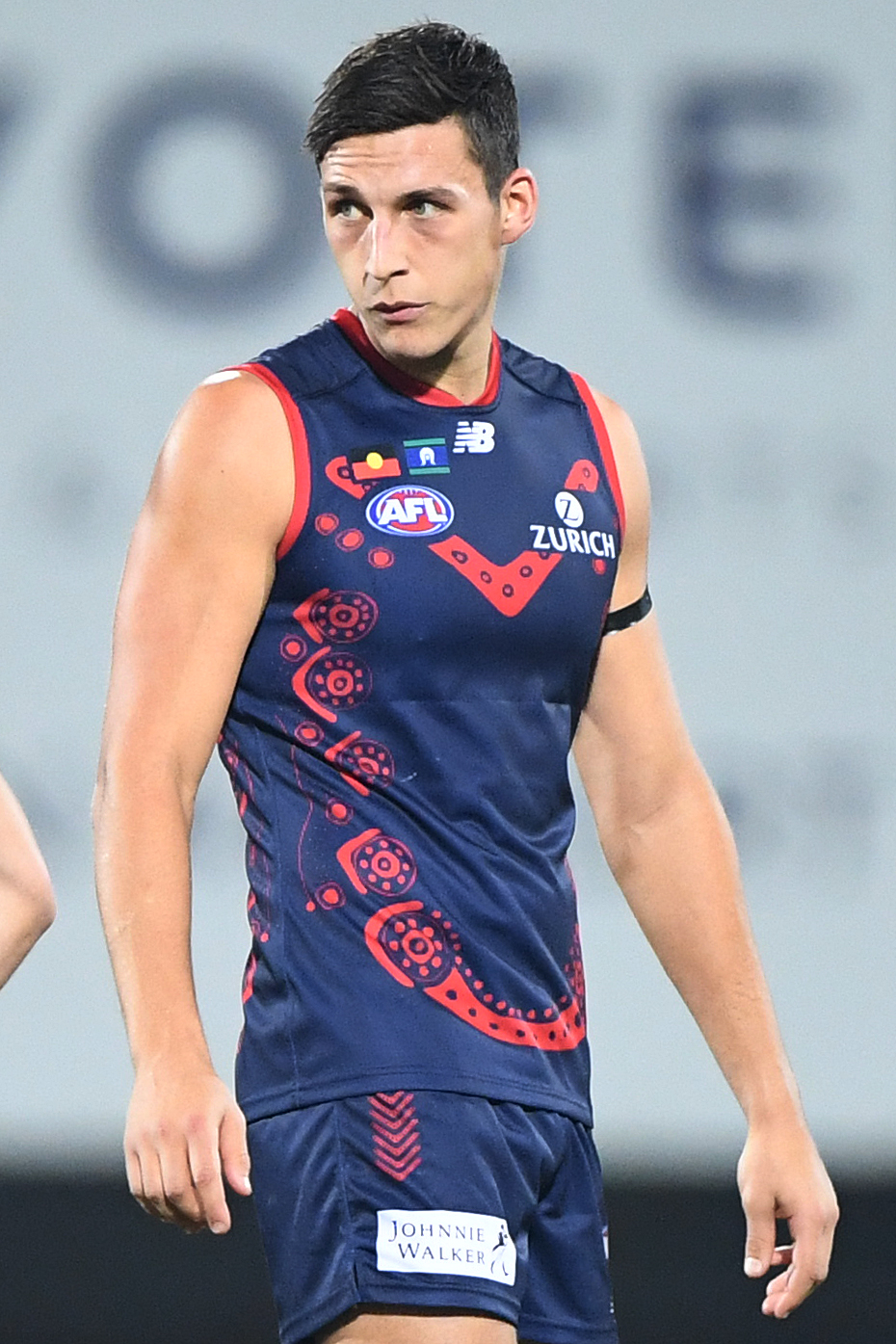
Sam Weideman playing for Melbourne in 2019

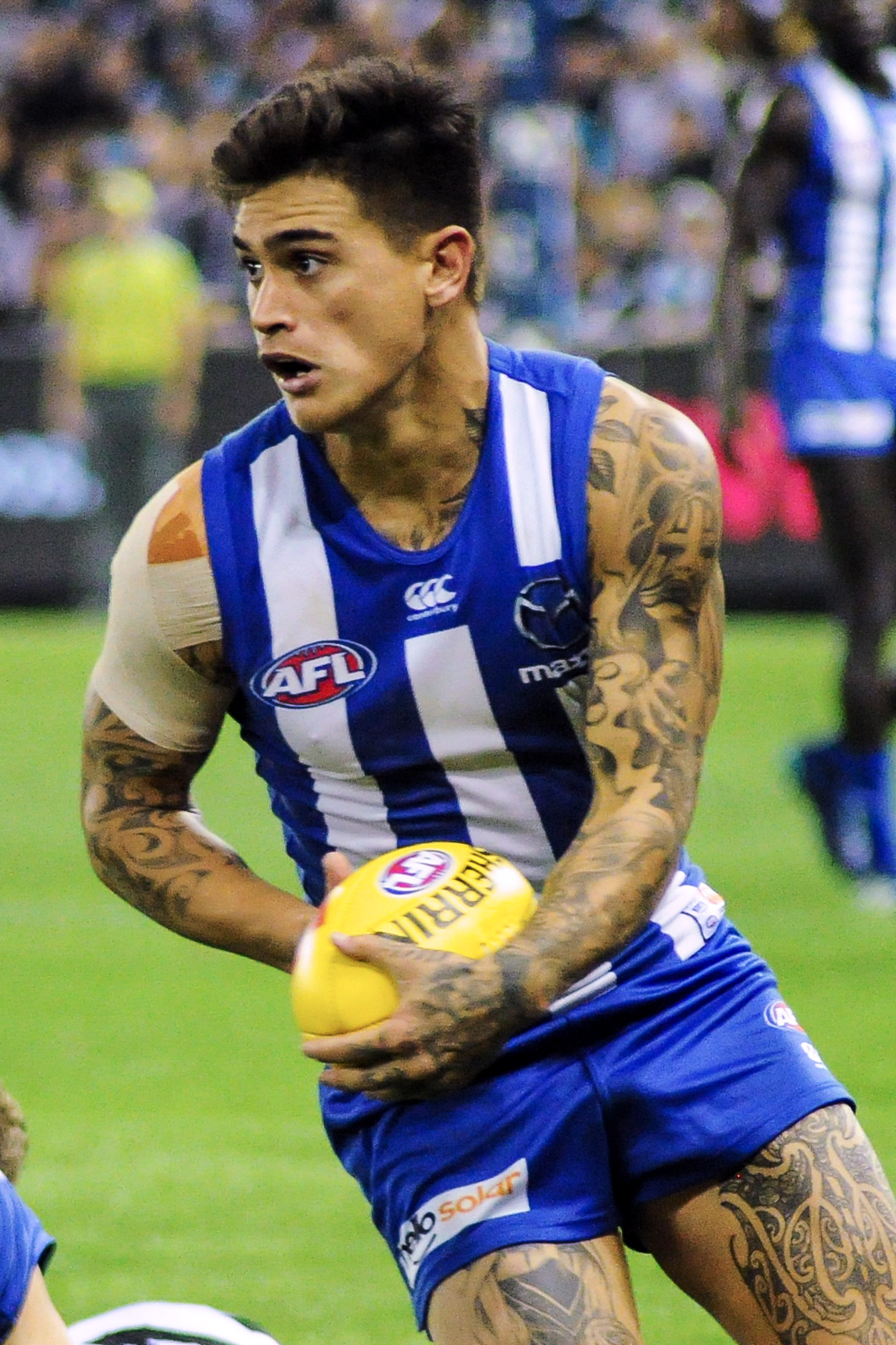
Marley Williams playing for North Melbourne in 2018

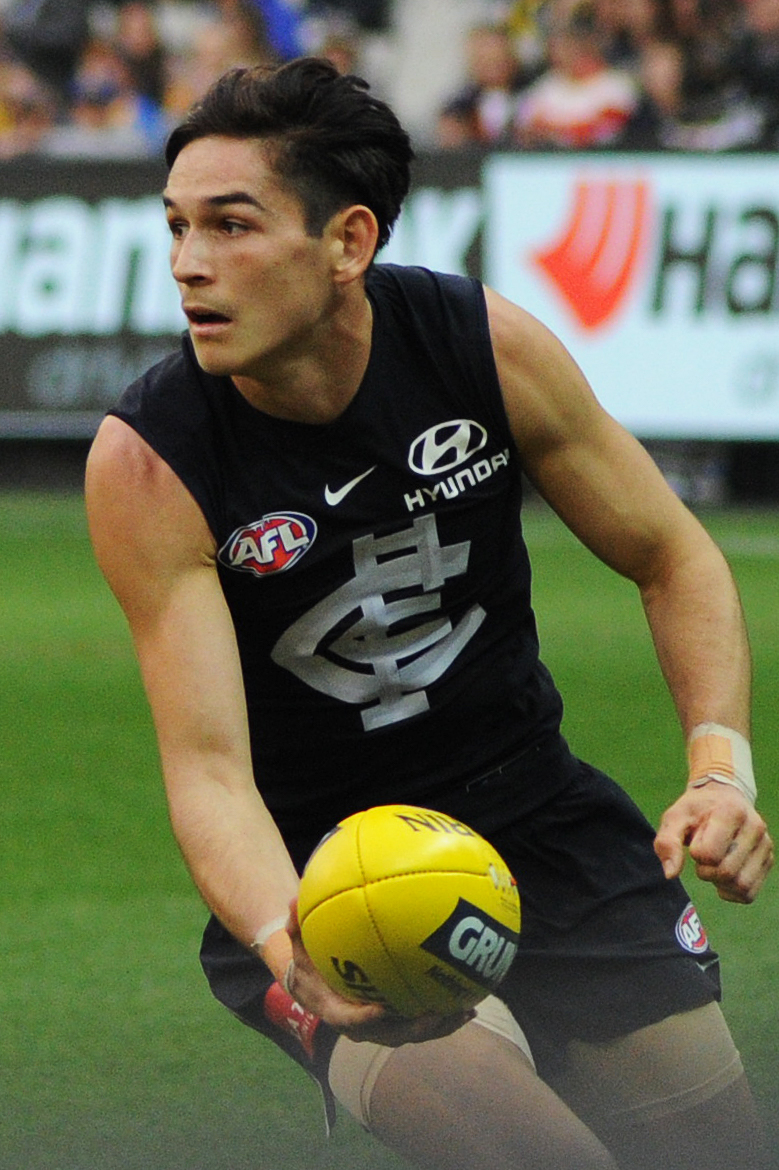
Zac Fisher playing for Carlton in 2018

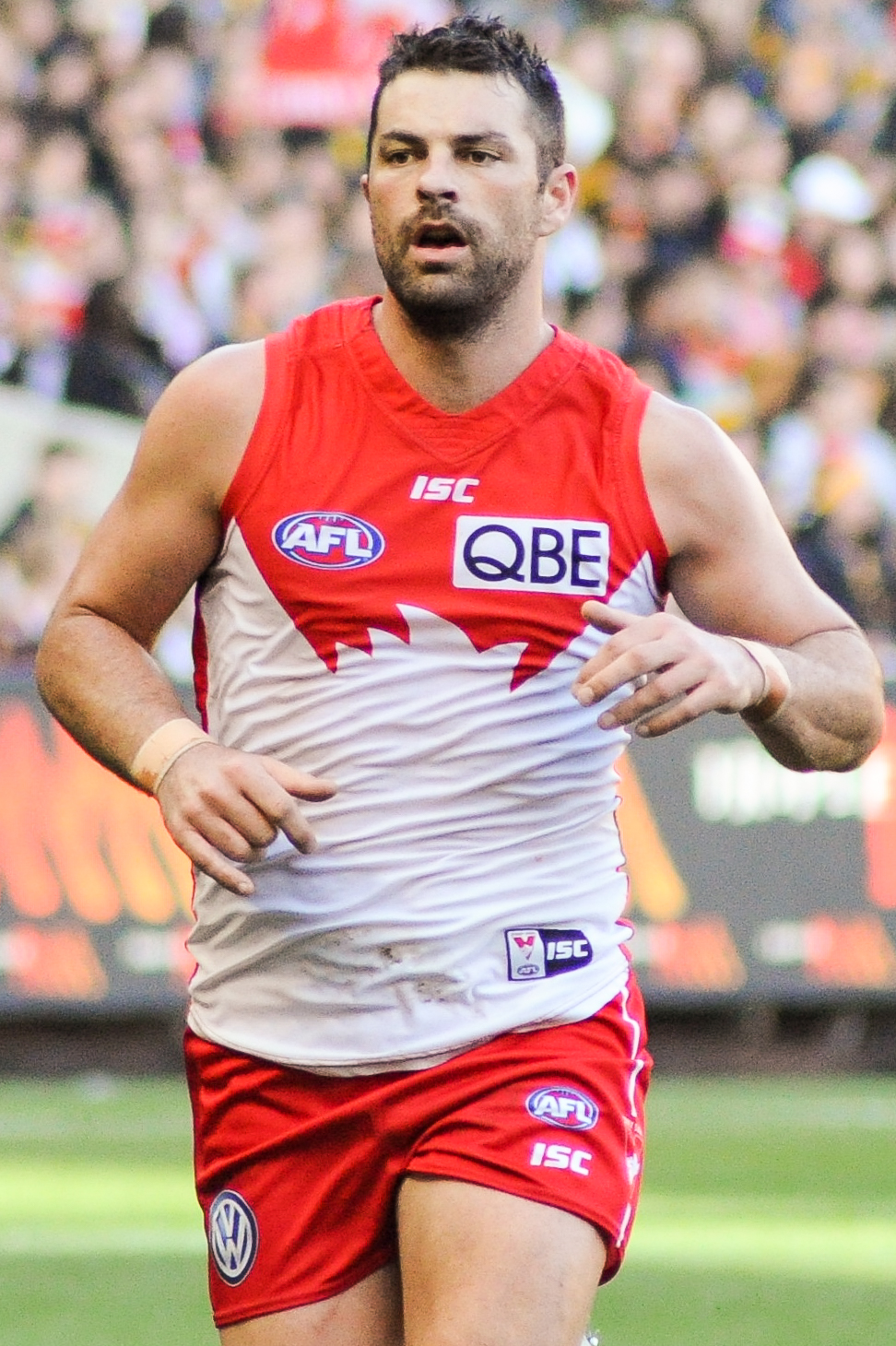
Heath Grundy, Sydney Swans premiership player in 2017

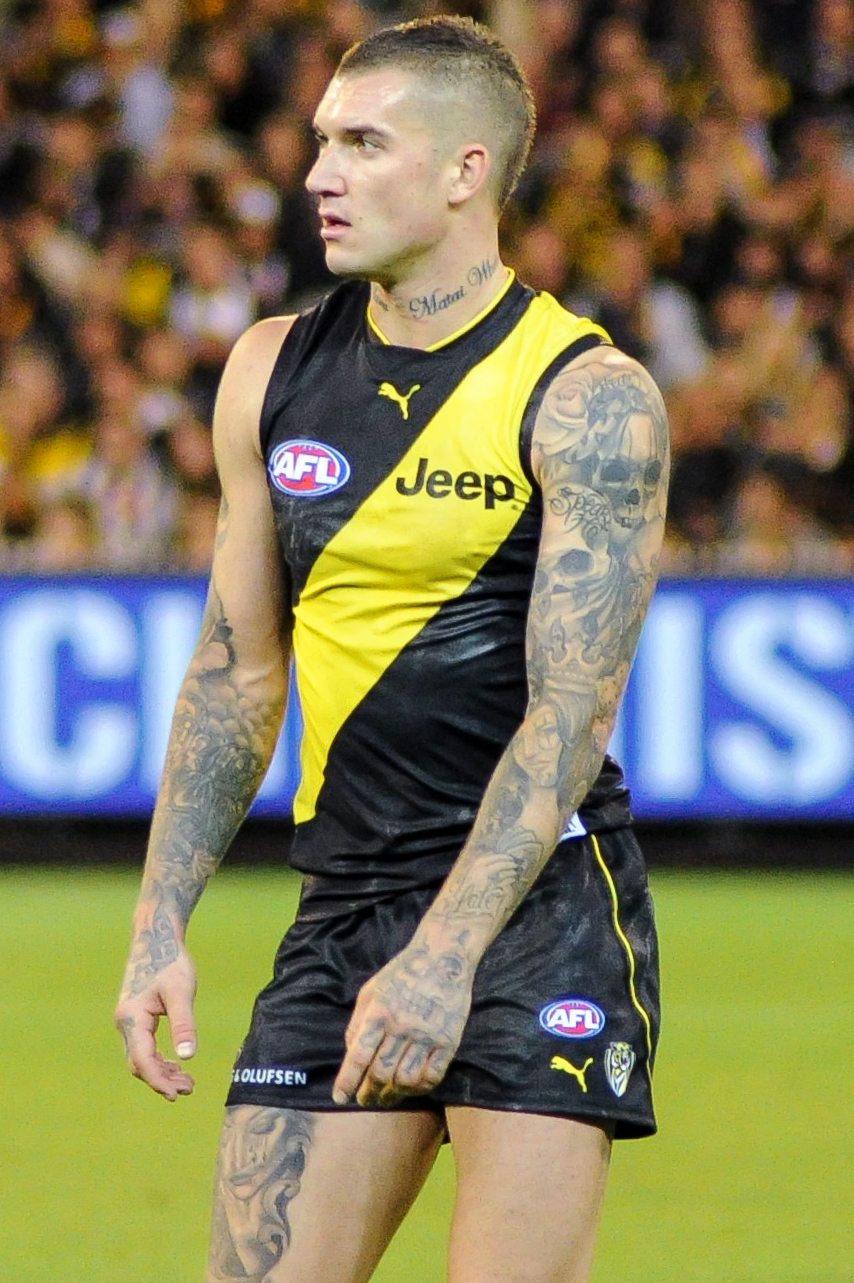
Dustin Martin, Richmond Brownlow medallist and premiership player in 2017

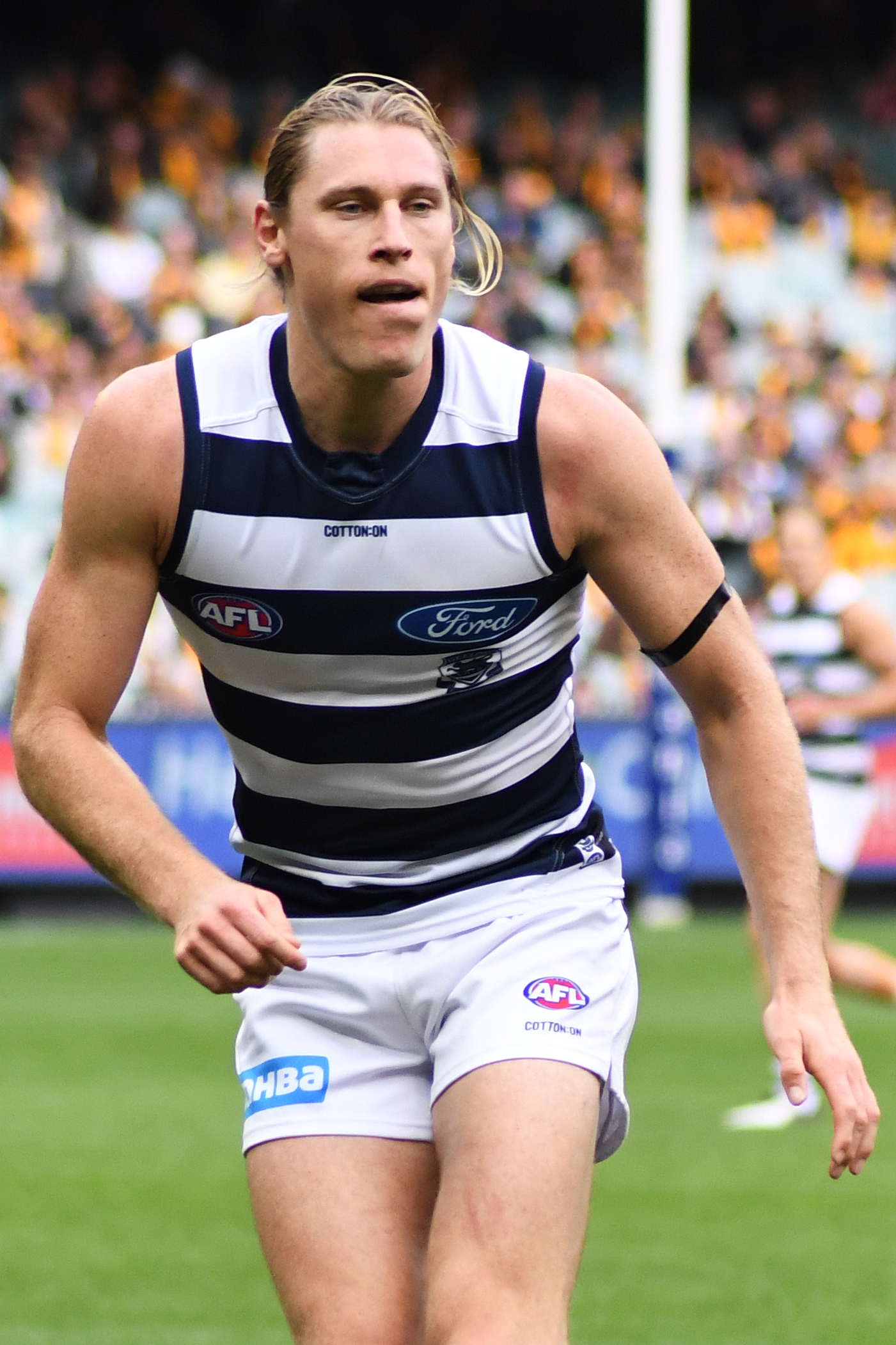
Mark Blicavs playing for Geelong in 2019

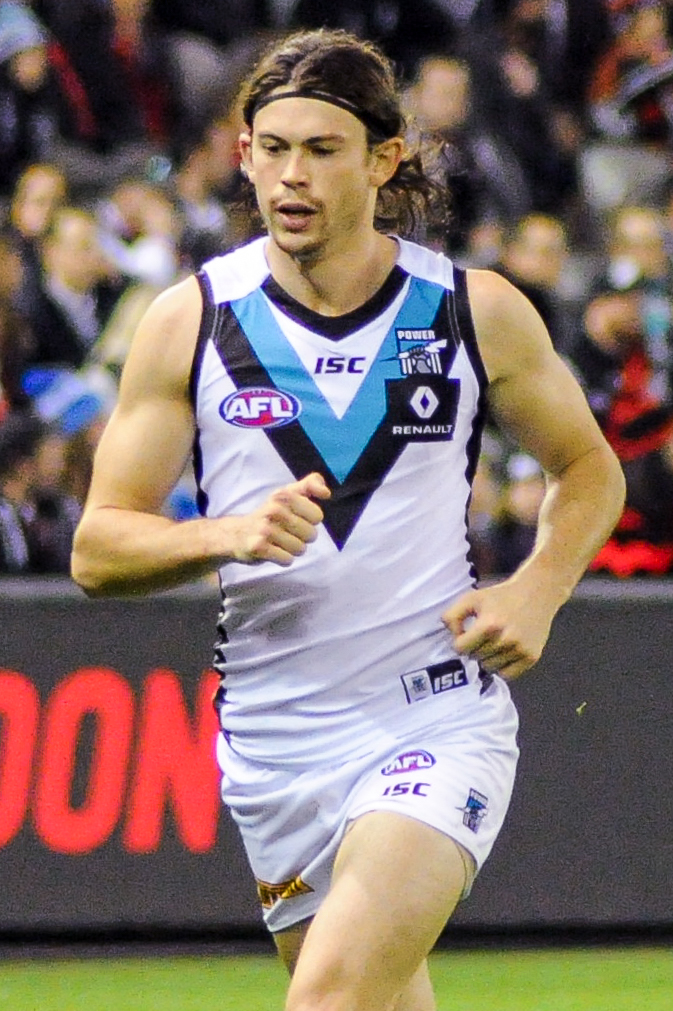
Jasper Pittard playing for Port Adelaide in 2017

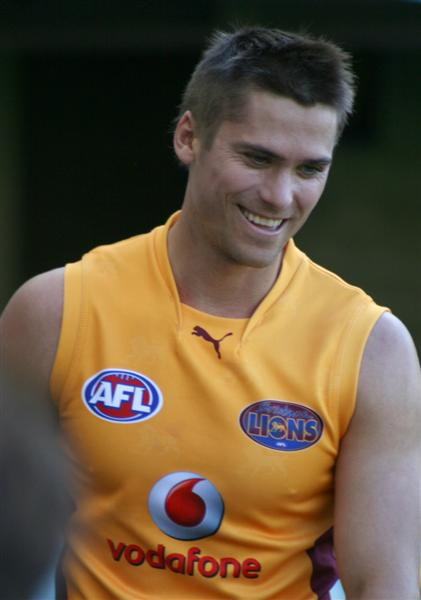
Simon Black, Brisbane Brownlow medallist and 3 time premiership player in 2008

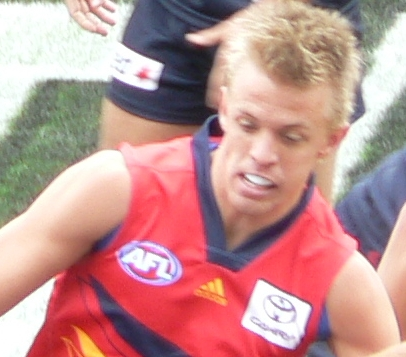
Nathan Van Berlo playing for Adelaide in 2007

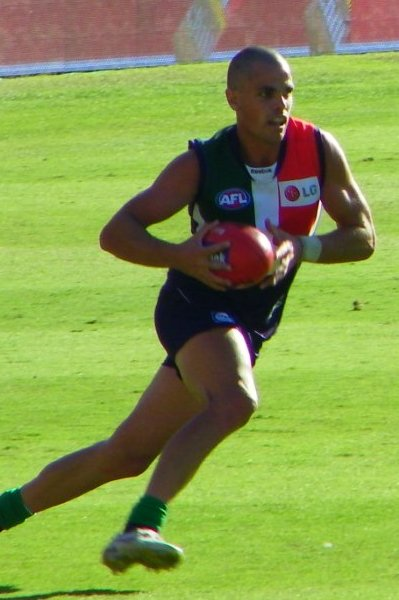
Brett Peake playing for Fremantle in 2006

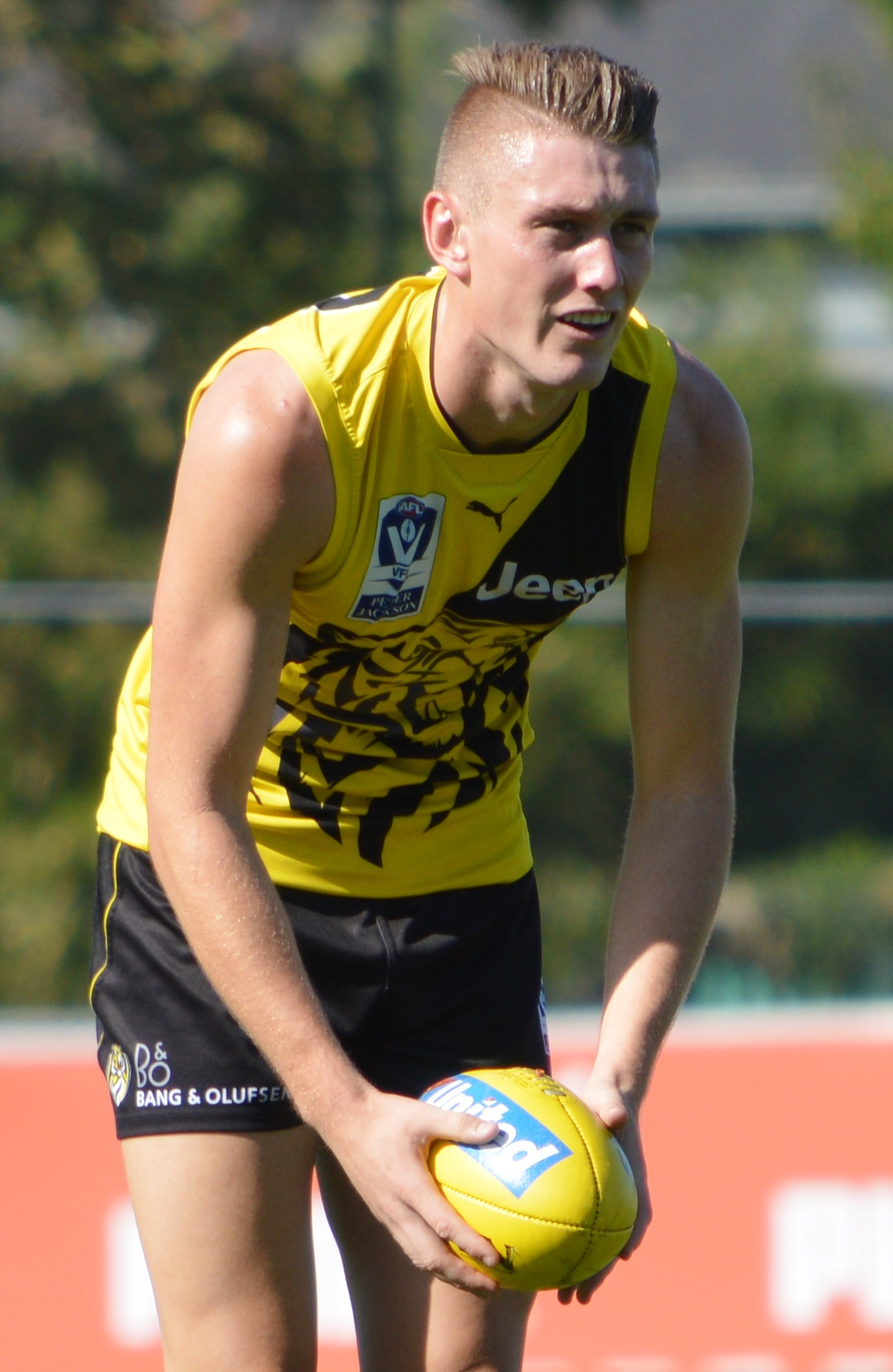
Callum Moore playing for Richmond in 2018

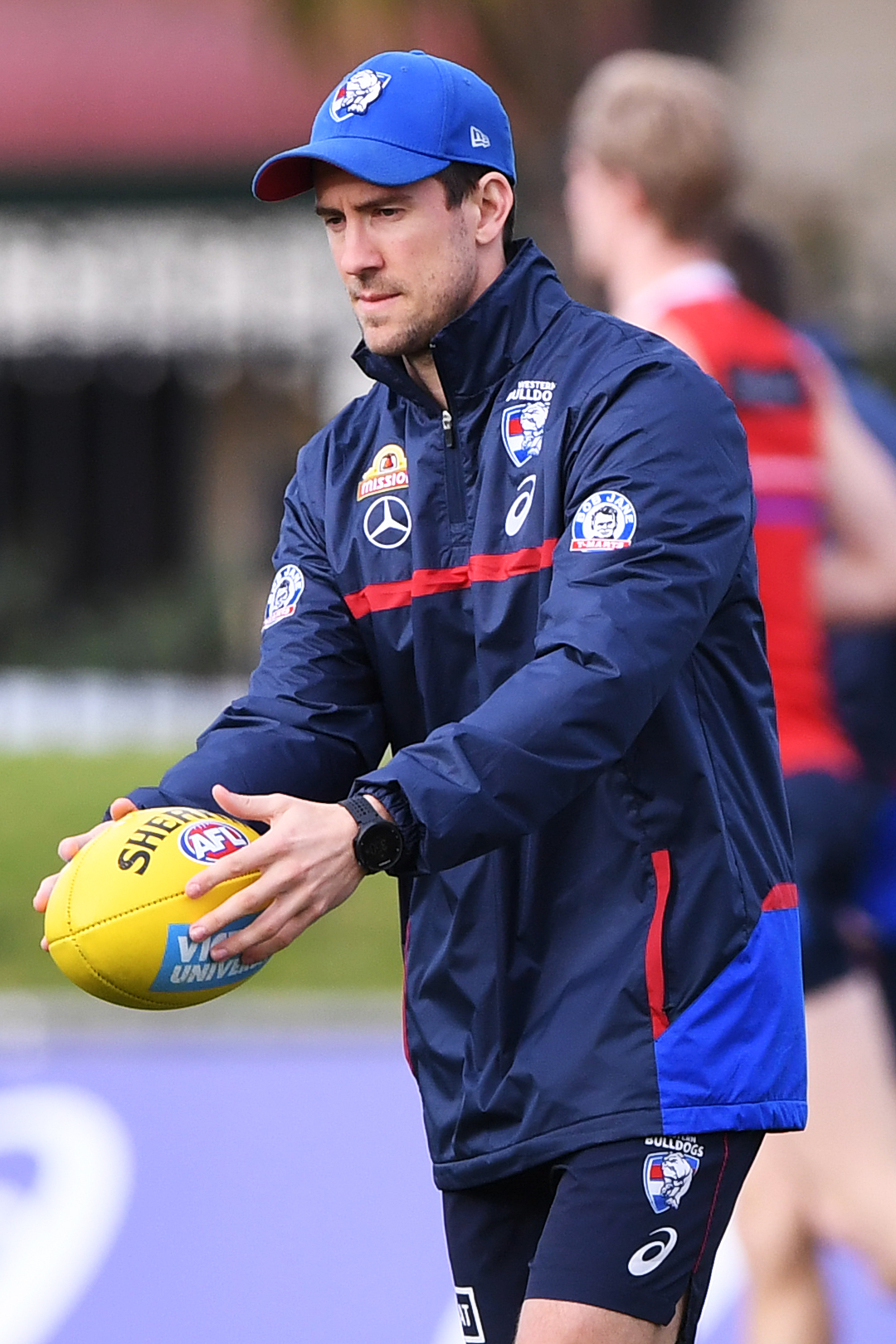
Jordan Russell for the Western Bulldogs in 2018

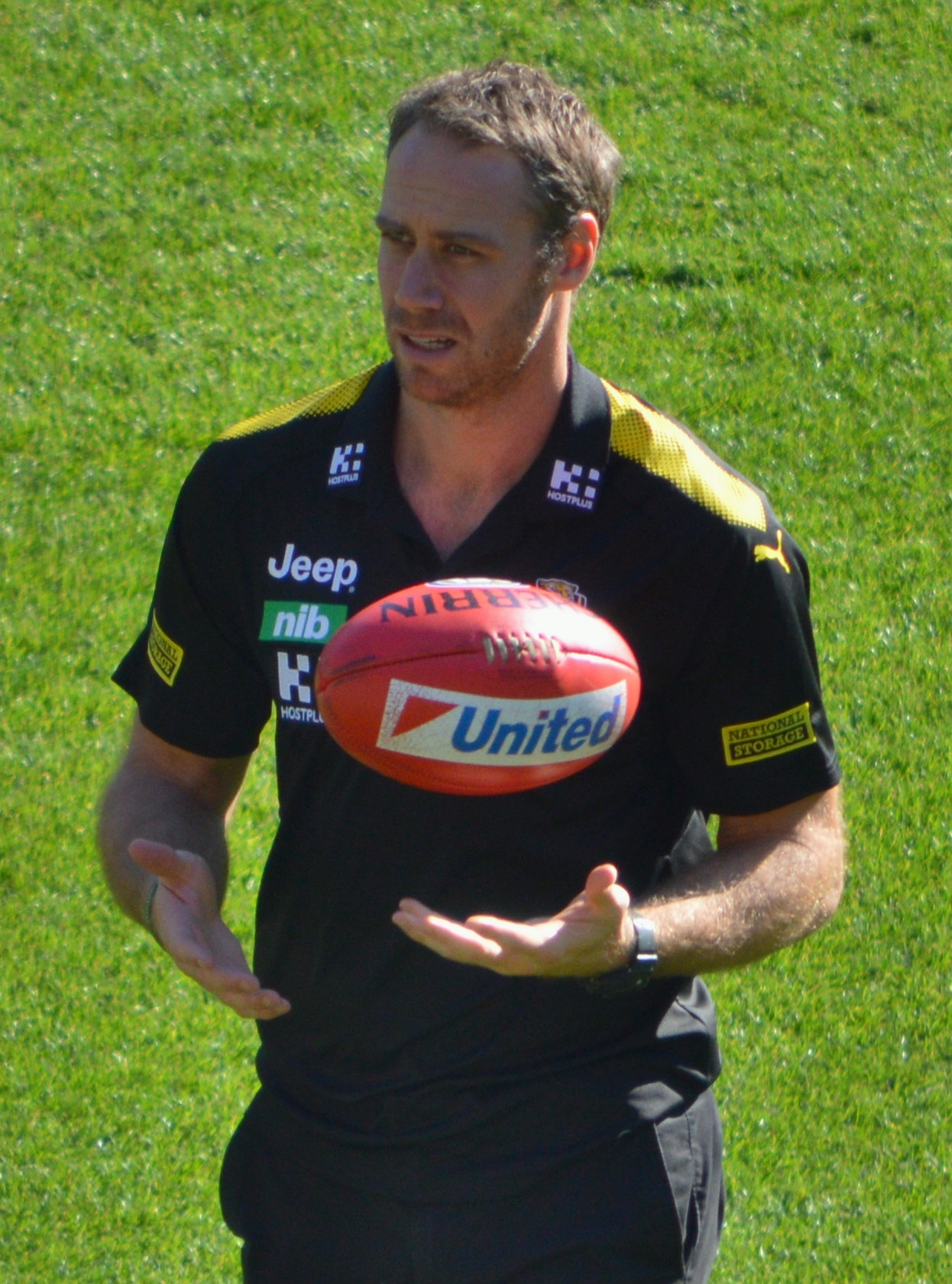
Ben Rutten as Richmond assistant coach in 2018

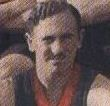
Barney Wood was from Wellington (pictured in 1928)

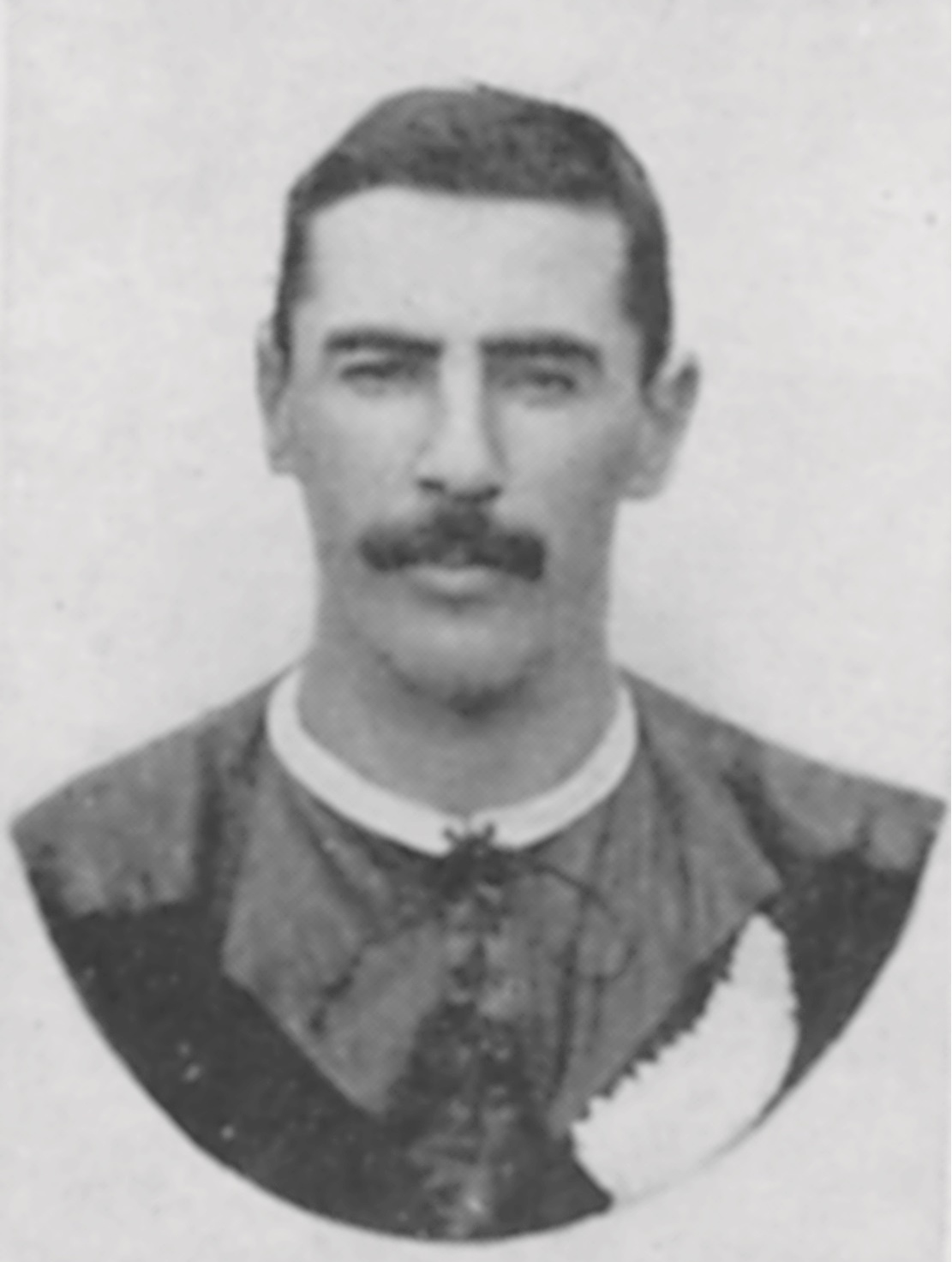
George A. Gillett (dual rugby international) of Leeston in Canterbury was part of New Zealand's 1908 Melbourne carnival team

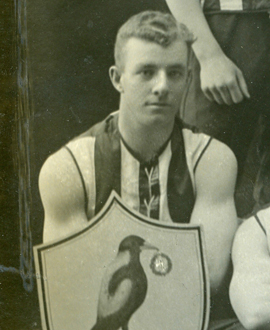
Bob Bryce was from Dunedin (pictured in 1901)

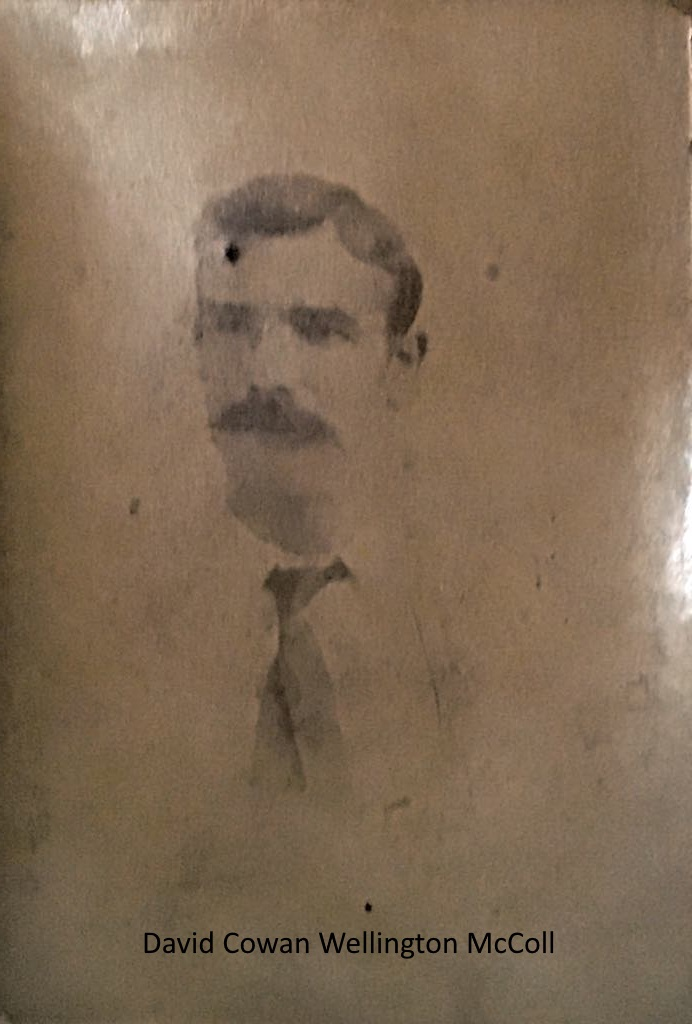
Dave McColl was from Dunedin

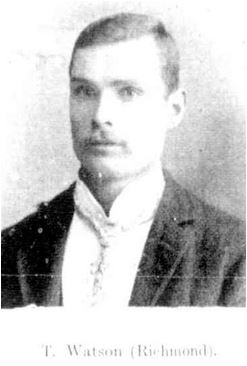
Tom Watson was from Dunedin (pictured in 1899)

Currently on an AFL senior list

| Player | NZ junior/senior club/s | Representative honours | AFL years* | AFL matches* | AFL goals* | Clubs played/playing for | Connections to New Zealand and references |
|---|---|---|---|---|---|---|---|
| Mykelti Lefau | - | 2017, 2018, 2019 | 2022- | 10 | 14 | Richmond | Born in Auckland, Samoan father, New Zealand mother |
| Misilifi Faimalo | | 2017 | 2022- | - | | Richmond (VFL) | Birth, Māori |
| Archie Perkins | | | 2021- | 62 | 43 | Essendon (AFL) | Both parents |
| Toby Wooller | | | 2021- | - | - | Brisbane Lions (AFL) | Born |
| Louis Butler | | | 2021- | 4 | 0 | Western Bulldogs (AFL) | Birth |
| Connor Ballenden | | | 2018–2021 | 3 | 1 | Brisbane Lions (AFL) | Birth |
| Dylan Clarke | | | 2018– | 24 | 6 | Essendon (AFL) | Parent |
| Oskar Baker | | | 2018– | 34 | 31 | Melbourne (AFL) | Parent |
| Zac Fisher | | | 2017– | 122 | 53 | Carlton (AFL) | Maori mother |
| Rowan Marshall | | | 2017– | 117 | 54 | St Kilda (AFL) | Born in Taranaki |
| Jordan Ridley | | | 2016– | 86 | 2 | Essendon (AFL) | Parent |
| Jake Patmore | | | 2017–2020 | - | | Port Adelaide (AFL) | Maori (Ngati Maru) |
| Ryan Clarke | | | 2016– | 97 | 21 | North Melbourne / Sydney (AFL) | Parent |
| Callum Moore | | | 2016-2020 | 10 | 5 | Richmond (AFL) | Parents |
| Rupert Wills | | | 2016–2020 | 23 | 1 | Collingwood (AFL) | Birth and upbringing Parent |
| Sam Weideman | | | 2016–2024 | 76 | 77 | Melbourne (AFL) | Parent |
| Sam Durdin | | | 2016–2024 | 24 | 1 | North Melbourne / Carlton (AFL) | Parent |
| Joe Baker-Thomas | City Demons / Wellington | 2014, 2017 | | - | | New Zealand / St Kilda (AFL) | Born and raised in Porirua (international scholarship) |
| Teia Miles | | | 2015–2019 | 12 | 5 | Hawthorn (AFL) | Maori heritage (father's side) |
| Kurt Heatherley | | U16 (2010, 2011), 2014 | 2014–2018 | 5 | 0 | Hawthorn (AFL) | Born and raised in Tauranga (international rookie) |
| Giovanni Mountain-Silbery | | | 2014–2016 | - | | St Kilda (AFL) | Birth and upbringing |
| Shem Tatupu | | 2013, 2018 | 2013–2016 | - | | Hawthorn (VFL + AFL) / Melbourne Storm (NRL) | Birth and upbringing (rookie) |
| Maia Westrup | | | 2013–2015 | - | | Melbourne (AFL) | Birth and upbringing New Zealand High Performance Academy. (international scholarship) |
| Siopi Ngata | | | 2013–2015 | - | | Hawthorn (AFL) | Birth and upbringing AFL Combine. (international scholarship) |
| Barclay Miller | | 2017 | 2013–2018 | - | | St Kilda (AFL) | Birth and upbringing (international scholarship) |
| Mark Blicavs | | | 2013– | 251 | 65 | Geelong (AFL) | Father |
| Marley Williams | | | 2012–2020 | 125 | 11 | North Melbourne (AFL) | Maori father |
| Daniel Pearce | | | 2012–2015 | 6 | 0 | Western Bulldogs (AFL) | Father |
| Jasper Pittard | | | 2011–2020 | 157 | 16 | Port Adelaide (AFL) | Mother |
| Karmichael Hunt | | | 2011–2014 | 44 | 6 | Gold Coast (AFL) | Born in Auckland, father from Cook Islands, mother from Samoa |
| Max Gawn | | | 2010– | 211 | 102 | Melbourne (AFL) | Raised in Greymouth |
| Dustin Martin | | | 2010–2024 | 302 | 338 | Richmond (AFL) | Father (Maori, Ngati Maru) |
| Shane Savage | | | 2009–2020 | 165 | 63 | St Kilda (AFL) | Born in Auckland, Maori father |
| Jay van Berlo | | | 2009–2012 | 32 | 10 | Fremantle (AFL) | Both parents |
| Greg Broughton | | | 2009–2015 | 110 | 19 | Fremantle / Gold Coast (AFL) | Maori father |
| Brent Renouf | | | 2008–2014 | 68 | 13 | Hawthorn (AFL) | Birth, both parents |
| Paul Bower | | | 2006–2012 | 90 | 5 | Carlton (AFL) | Maori mother |
| Adam Campbell | | 2012 | 2006–2009 | 13 | 13 | Fremantle (AFL) | Born in Christchurch, parents |
| Heath Grundy | | | 2005–2019 | 256 | 24 | Sydney (AFL) | Mother |
| Nathan Van Berlo | | | 2005–2016 | 182 | 68 | Adelaide (AFL) | Both parents |
| Jordan Russell | | | 2005–2013 | 125 | 18 | Carlton / Collingwood (AFL) | Mother |
| Brett Peake | | | 2005–2012 | 118 | 62 | Fremantle / St Kilda (AFL) | Maori |
| Beau Maister | | | 2005–2014 | 44 | 27 | West Coast / St Kilda (AFL) | Mother from Christchurch |
| Aaron Edwards | | | 2003–2014 | 91 | 139 | Kangaroos (AFL) | Father, Samoan mother |
| Ben Rutten | | | 2003–2014 | 229 | 9 | Adelaide (AFL) | Mother |
| Trent Croad | | | 1998–2009 | 222 | 189 | Hawthorn (AFL) | Born in Auckland, parents |
| Simon Black | | 2017, 2018 | 1998–2013 | 322 | 171 | Brisbane (AFL) | Father (by birth) |
| Daniel McAlister | | | 1997–2002 | 6 | 0 | Essendon (AFL) | Birth, part Maori raised in Taranaki to the age of 12 |
| Danny Dickfos | | | 1996–1999 | 65 | 0 | Brisbane (AFL) | Part Maori |
| Donald Dickie | | 2012 | 1996–2000 | 55 | 19 | Port Adelaide (AFL) | Birth, part Maori |
| Wayne Schwass | | 2012c | 1988–2002 | 282 | 154 | North Melbourne/Kangaroos (VFL/AFL) / Sydney (AFL) | Born Christchurch, part Maori |
| Warren Jones | | | 1978–1988 | 123 | 36 | Carlton (VFL/AFL) | Born in Wellington |
| Brian Peake | | | 1974-1977 | 66 | 49 | Geelong (VFL/AFL) | Maori |
| Peter Bennett | | | 1944–1954 | 80 | 27 | Hawthorn / Essendon (VFL/AFL) | Birth |
| Marty McDonnell | | | 1939–1950 | 92 | 2 | Footscray (VFL/AFL) | Born in Wellington |
| Joe Sellwood | | | 1930–1945 | 180 | 97 | Geelong (VFL/AFL) | Born in Mataura |
| Arthur Watson | | | 1929 | 2 | 0 | Hawthorn(VFL/AFL) | Born in Onehunga |
| Barney Wood | | | 1928 | 5 | 0 | Melbourne (VFL/AFL) | Born in Wellington |
| Thomas O'Halloran | | | 1925–1934 | 142 | 120 | Richmond (VFL/AFL) | Born in Timaru |
| Jack Barnett | | | 1924-26 | 13 | 11 | Richmond (VFL/AFL) | Born in Auckland |
| Harry Haughton | | | 1912–19 | 113 | 49 | Carlton (VFL/AFL) | Born in Whanganui |
| Frank Macky | | | 1911 | 7 | 2 | Melbourne University (VFL/AFL) | Born in Auckland |
| Bill Mearns | | | 1910 | 3 | 1 | St Kilda (VFL/AFL) | Born Tokatoka |
| Dave McColl | | | 1904 | 5 | 0 | South Melbourne (VFL/AFL) | Born in Dunedin |
| Tom Watson | | | 1902-1904 | 15 | 0 | Richmond (VFA), Carlton / Melbourne (VFL/AFL) | Born in Dunedin |
| Charlie Meadway | | | 1879-1907 | 4 | 0 | Carlton / Collingwood (VFL/AFL) | Born in Dunedin |
| Bob Bryce | | | 1899-1902 | 18 | 12 | South Melbourne / Collingwood (VFL/AFL) | Born in Dunedin |
| Jim Cowcher | | | 1898 | 5 | 0 | Carlton (VFL/AFL) | Born in Napier |
| Artie Machin | | | 1898 | 3 | 0 | South Melbourne (VFL/AFL) | Born in Timaru |
| Abe McDougall | | | 1898-1902 | 59 | 28 | Fitzroy (VFL/AFL) | Born in Auckland |
| Jack Southern | | | 1891-1899 | 31 | 3 | South Melbourne (VFA, VFL/AFL) | Born in Dunedin |

=== Women's ===
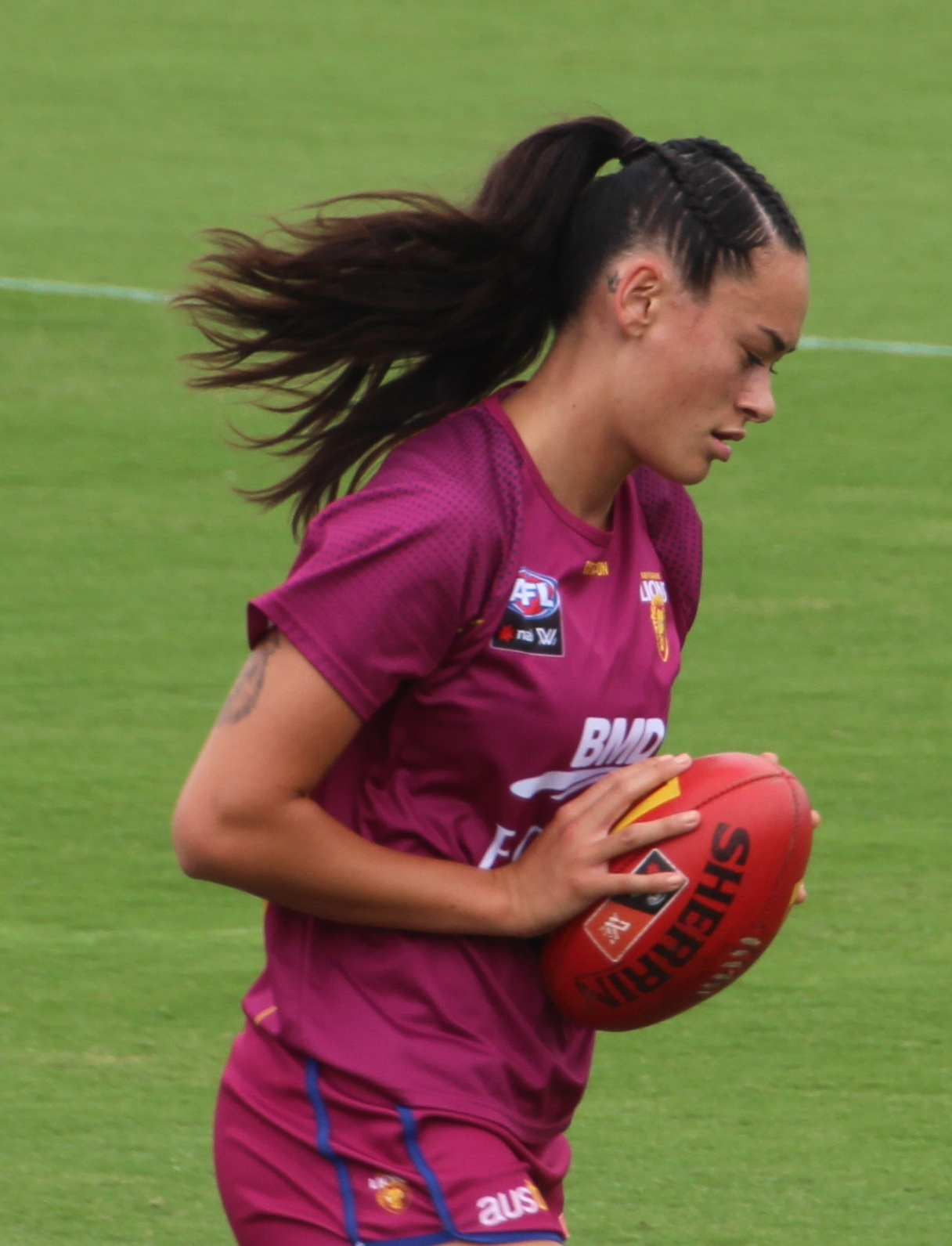
Jesse Tawhiao-Wardlaw is from Ashburton

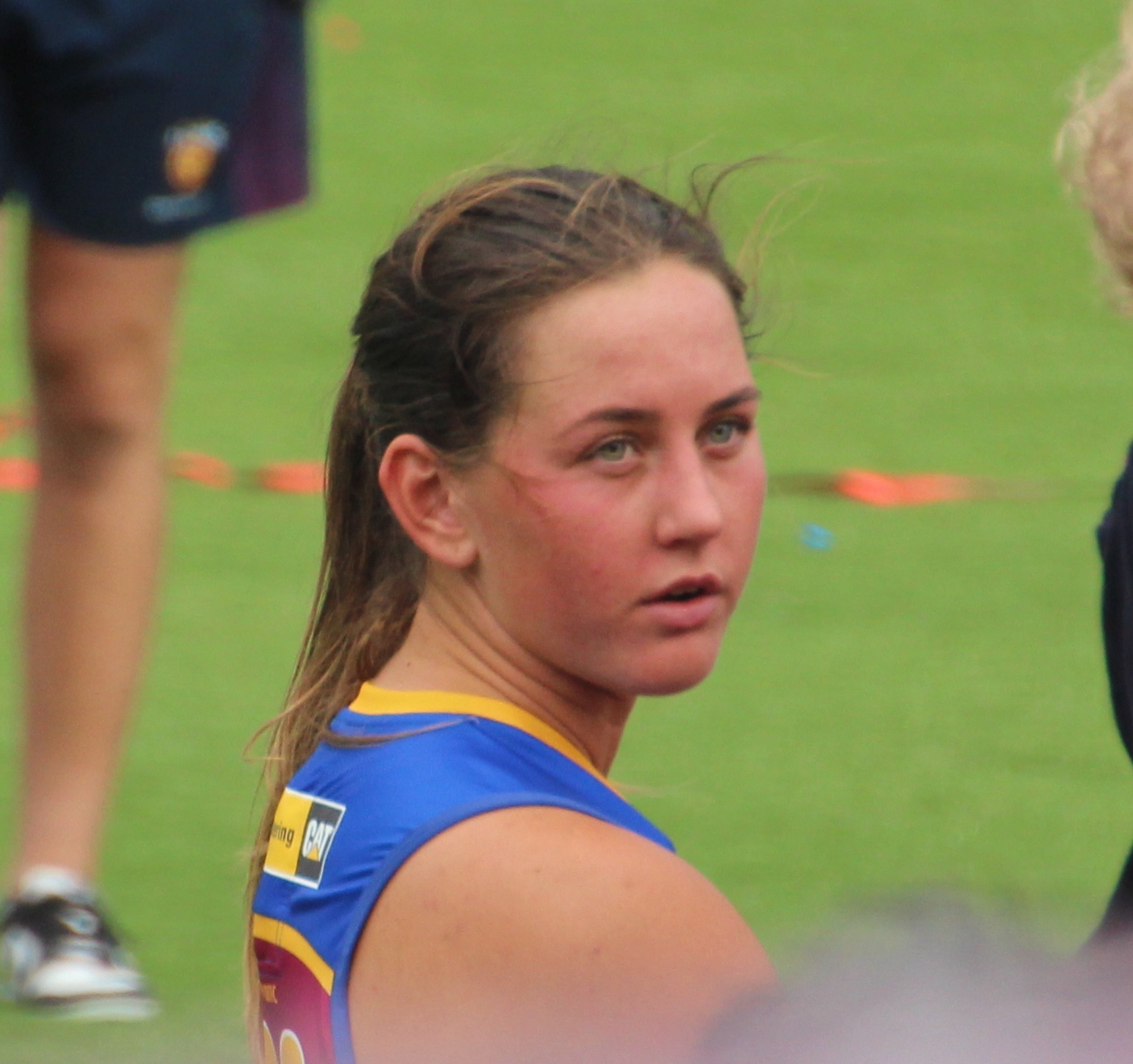
Dee Heslop is from Auckland

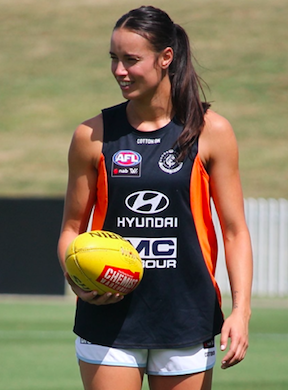
Brooke Walker is from Christchurch

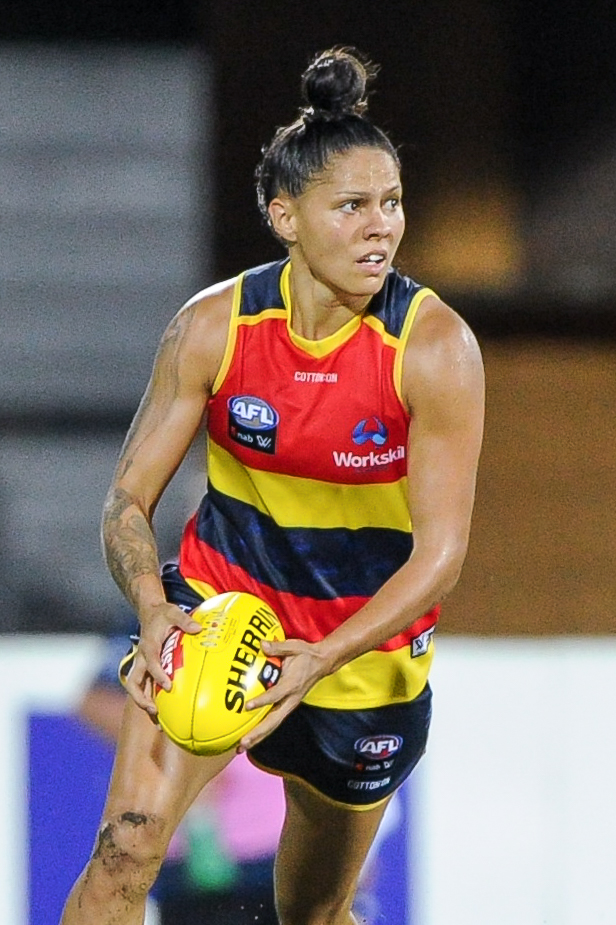
Stevie-Lee Thompson is from Hawke's Bay

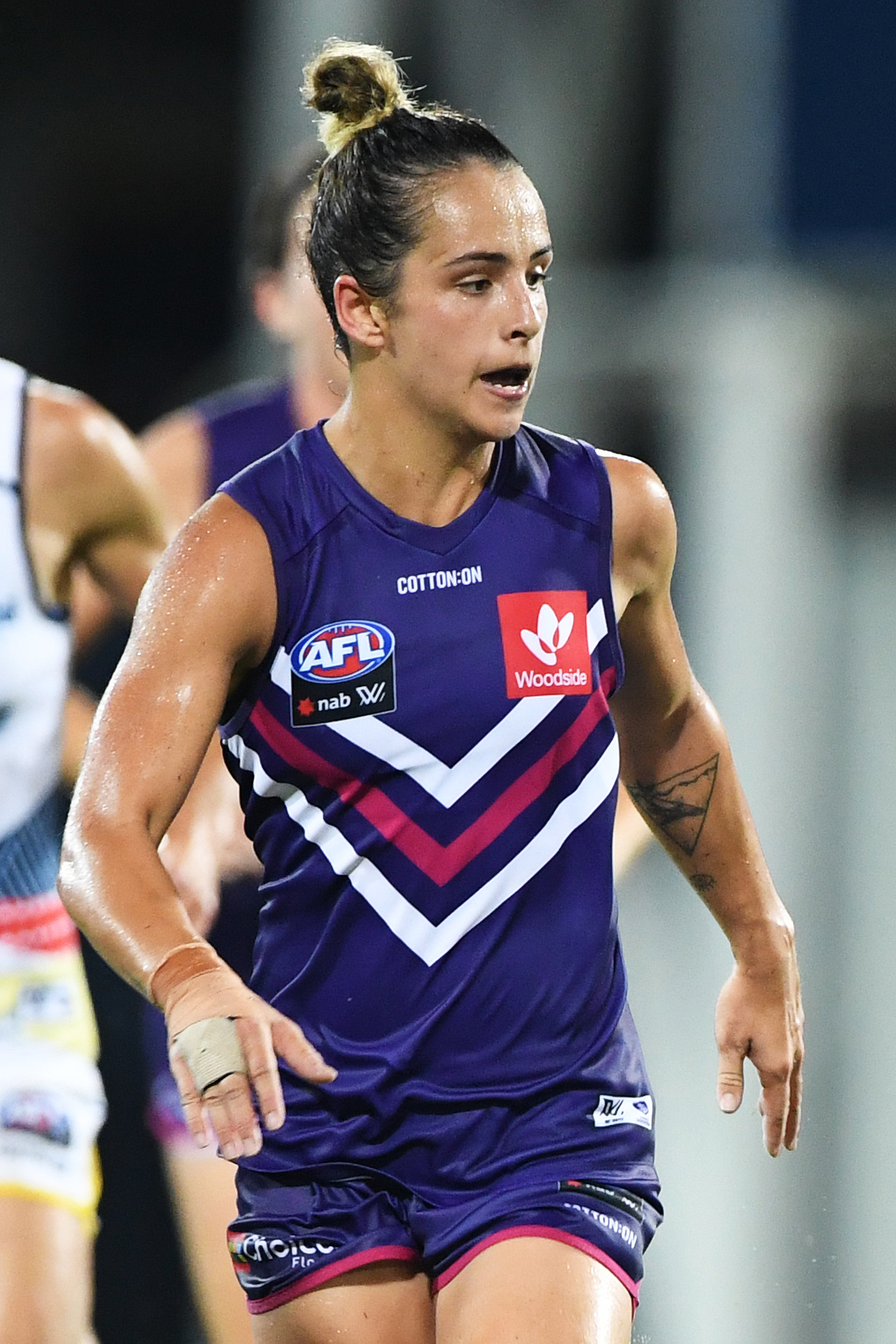
Angelique Stannett playing for Fremantle in 2019

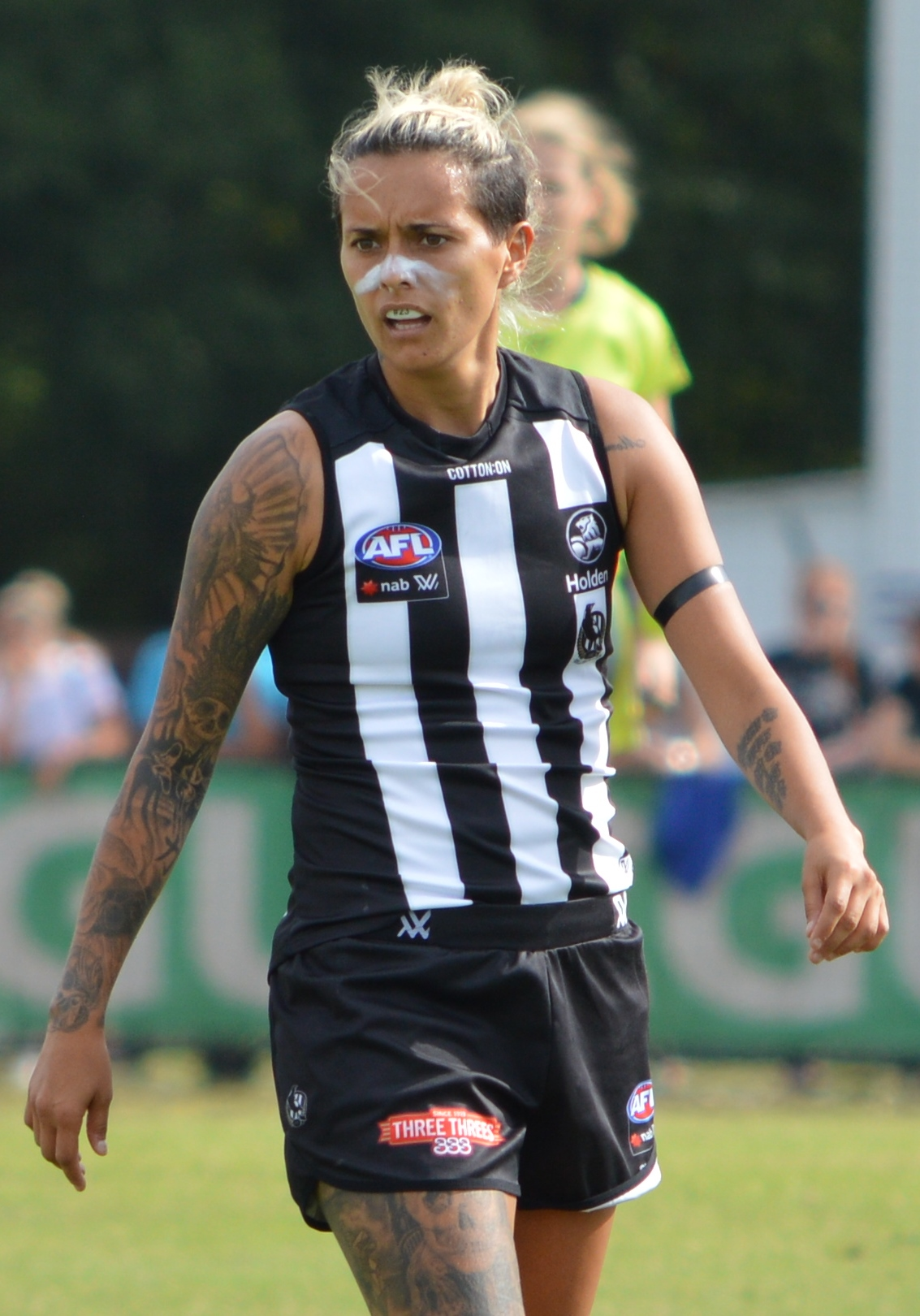
Moana Hope playing for club Collingwood in 2018

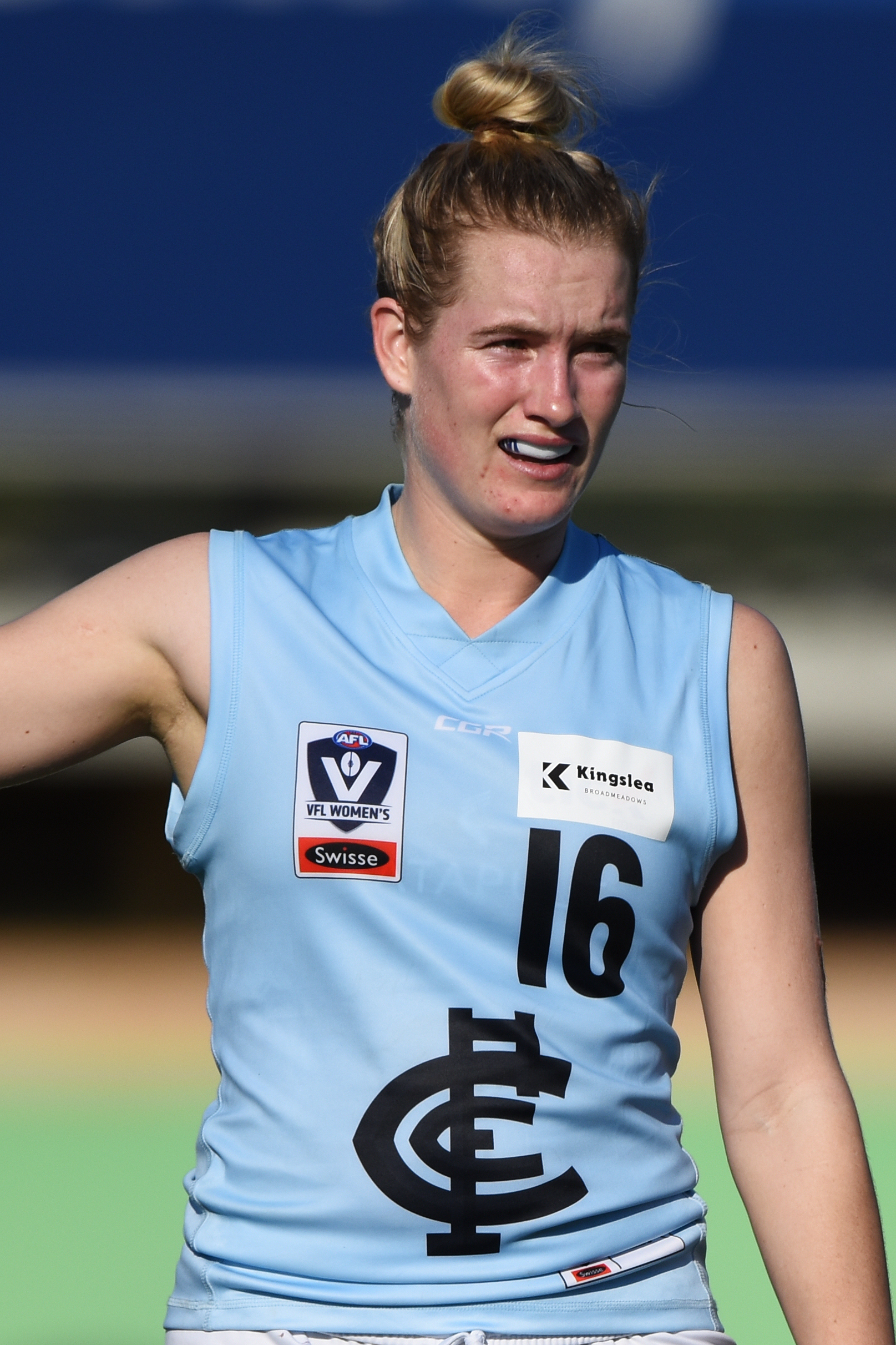
Breann Moody playing for Carlton in 2019

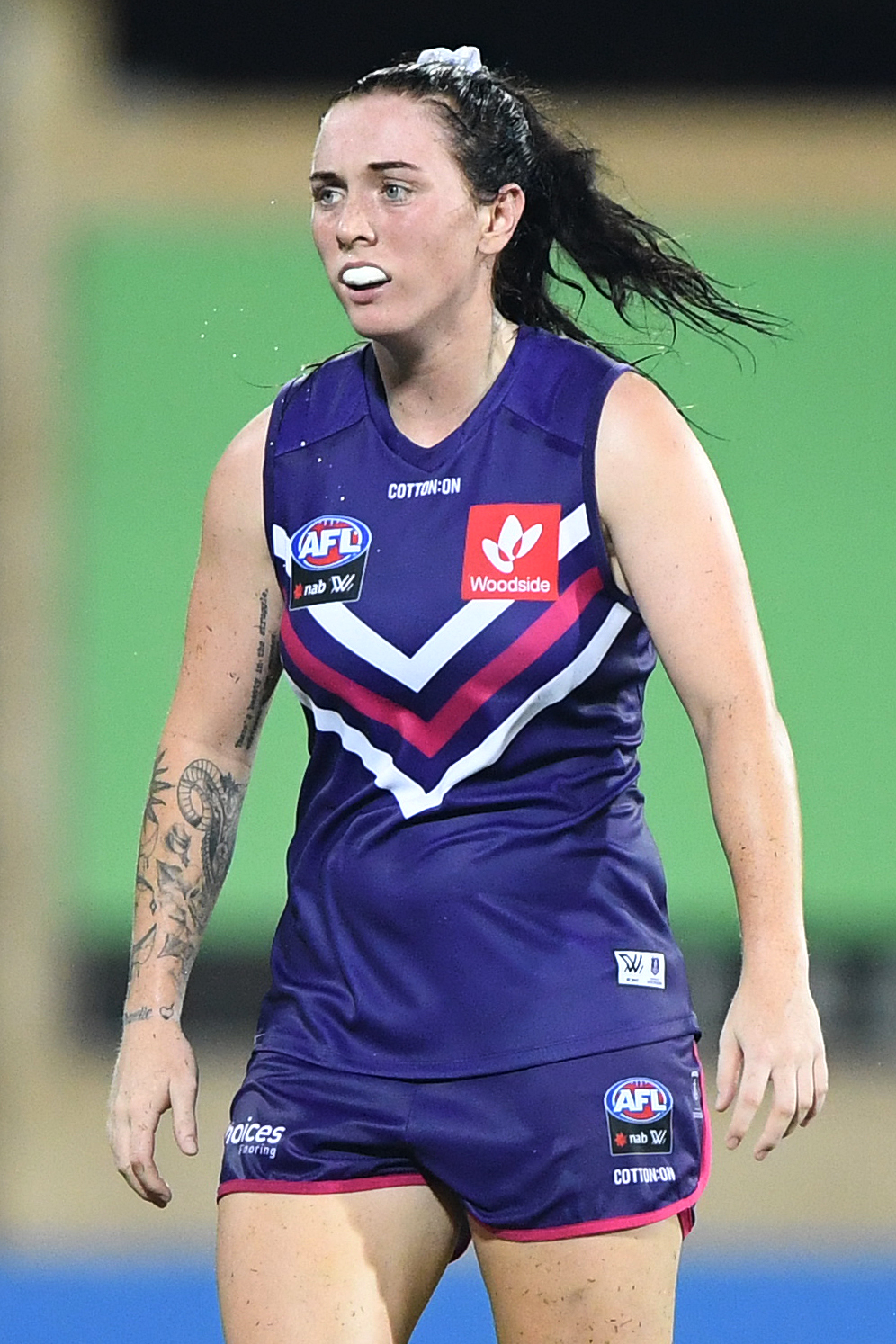
Sabreena Duffy playing for Fremantle in 2019

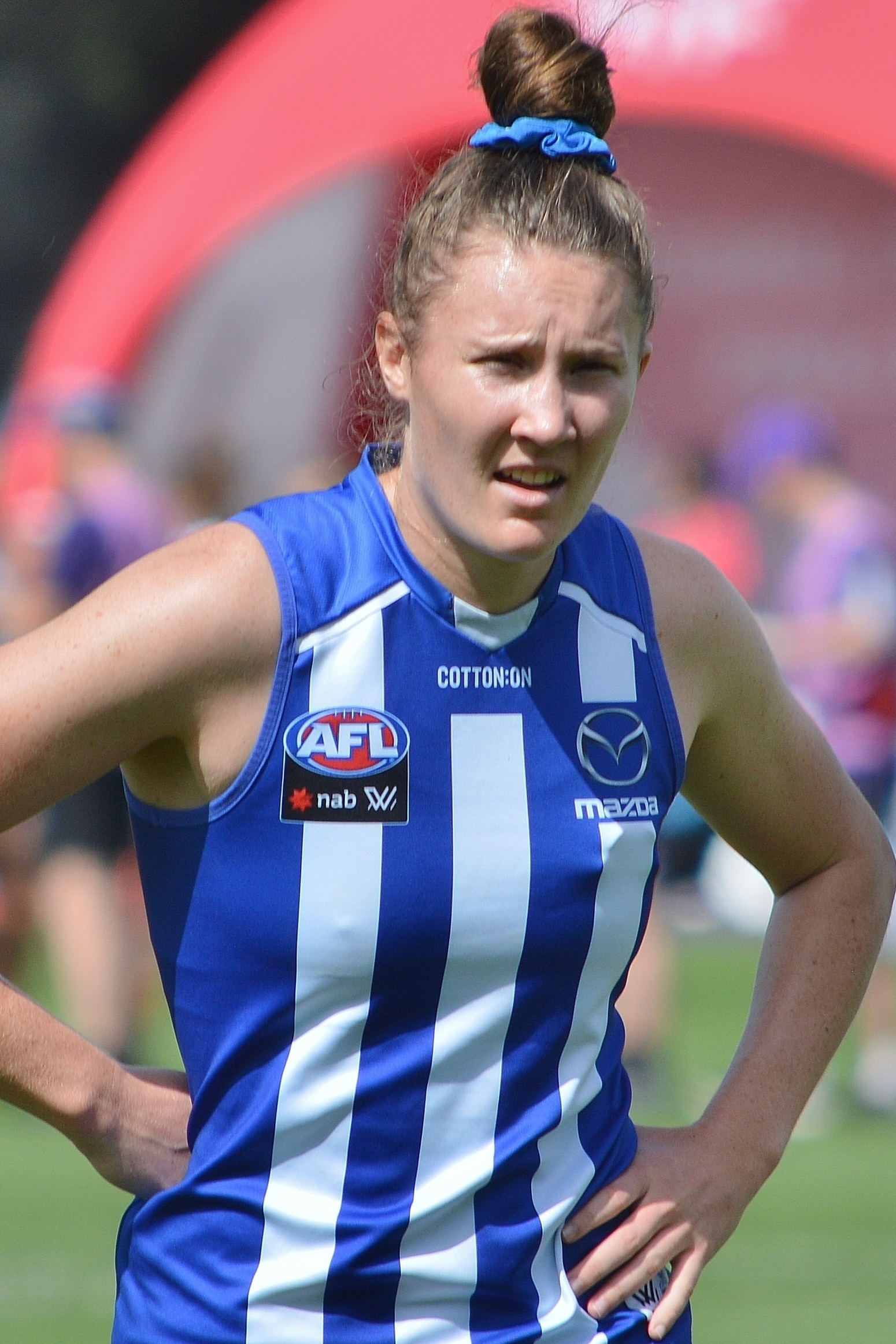
Tahlia Randall playing for North Melbourne

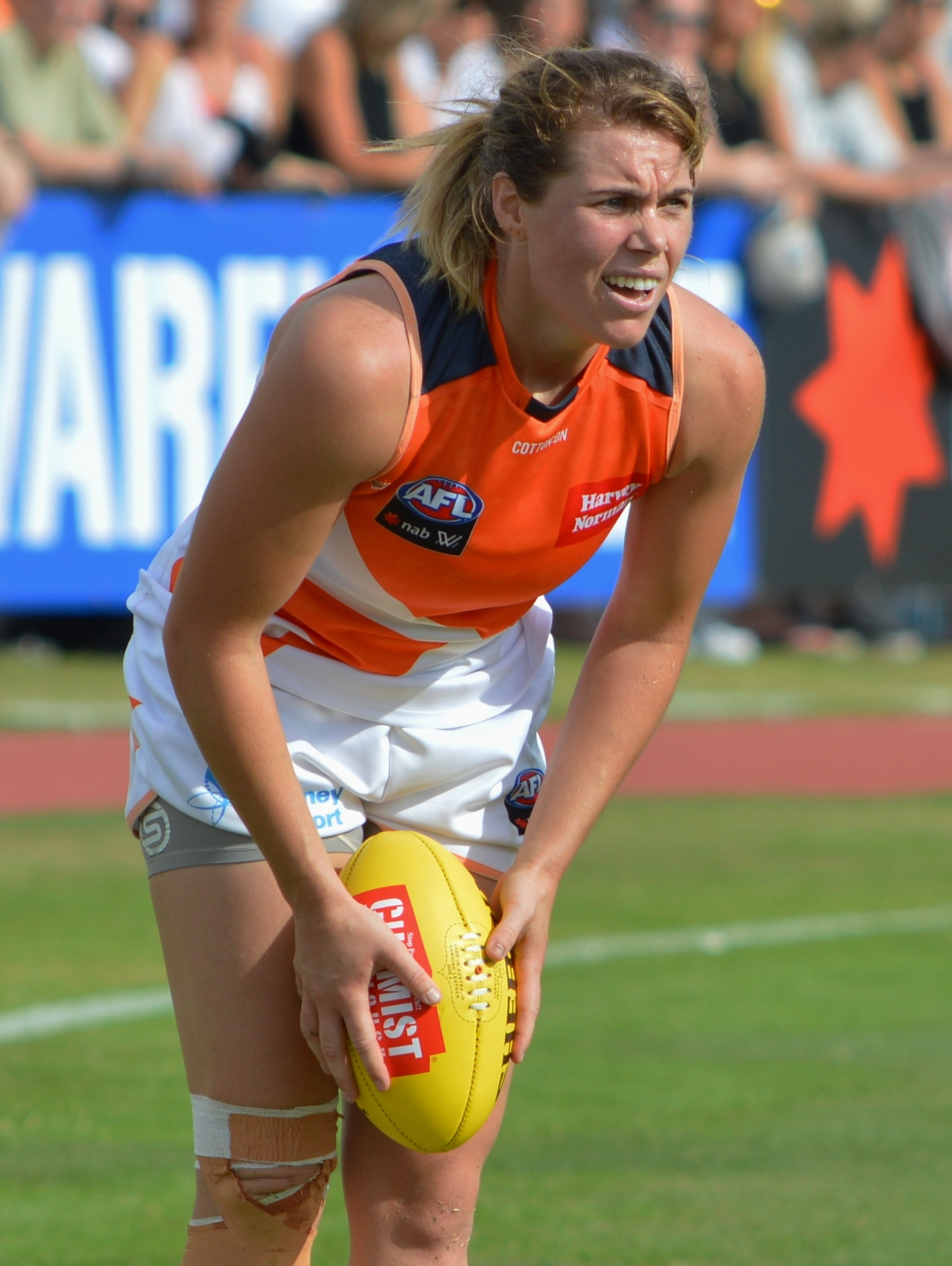
Jacinda Barclay playing for Greater Western Sydney in 2018

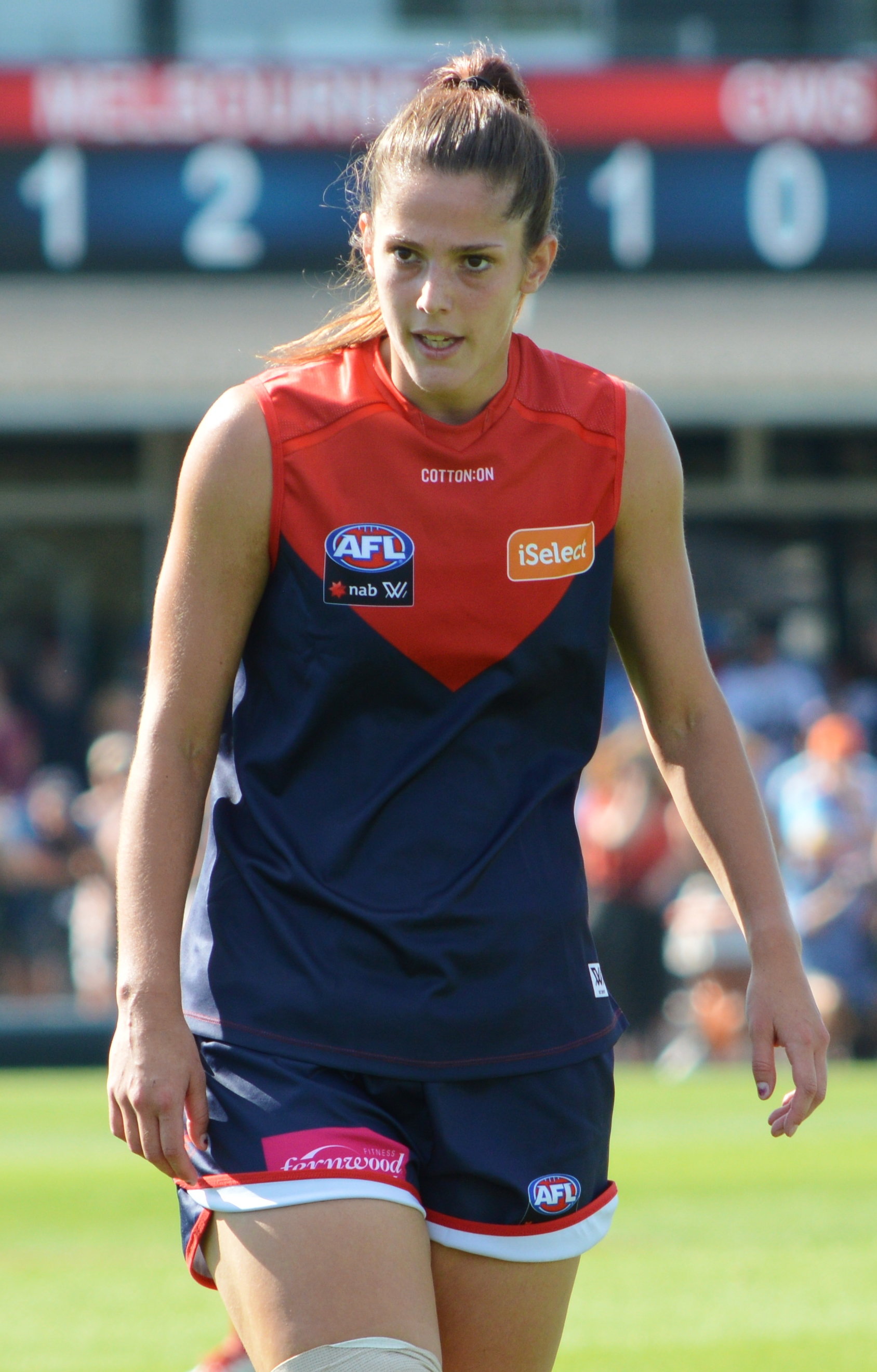
Lauren Pearce playing for Melbourne in 2018

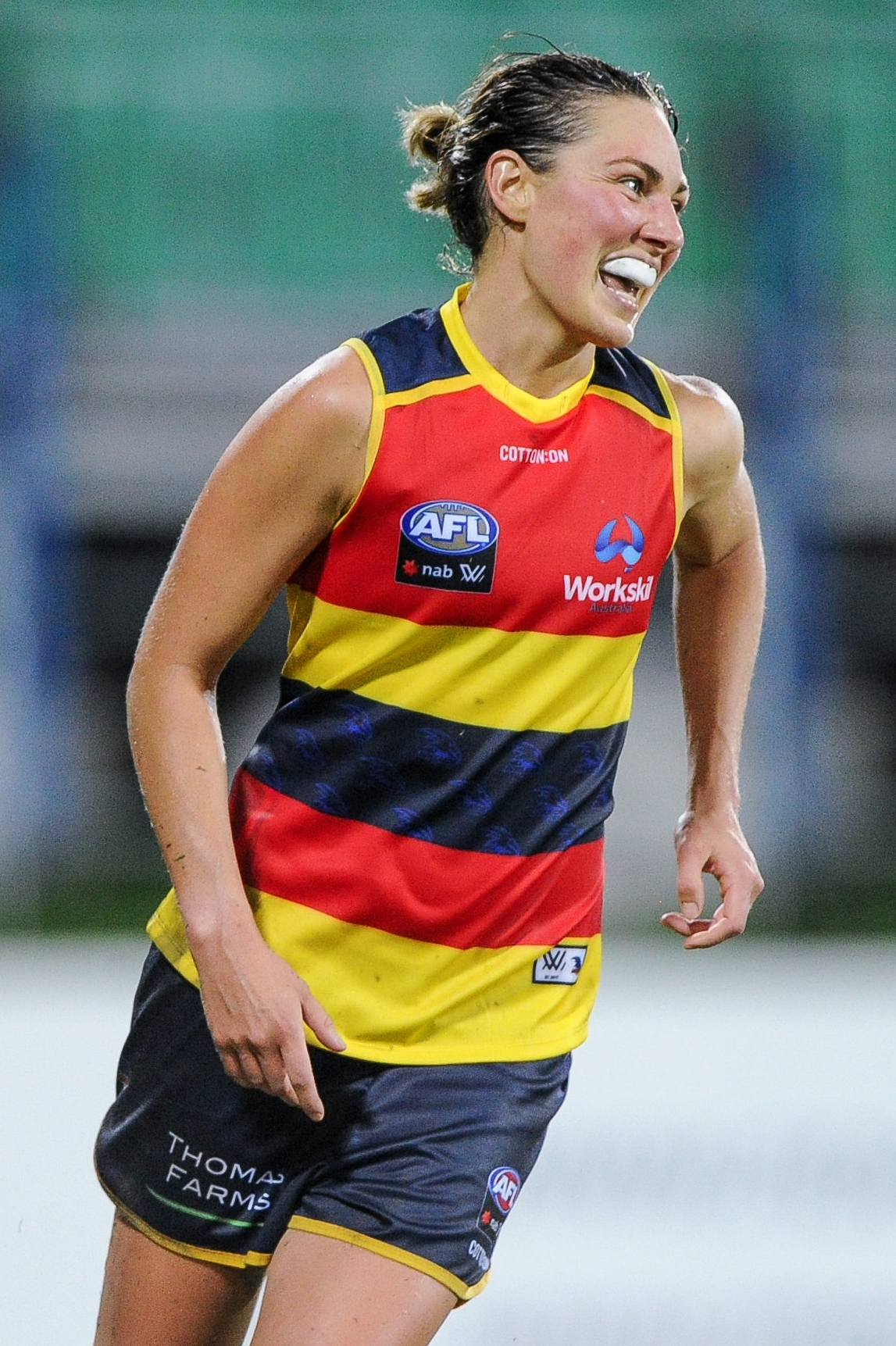
Rheanne Lugg playing for Adelaide in 2018

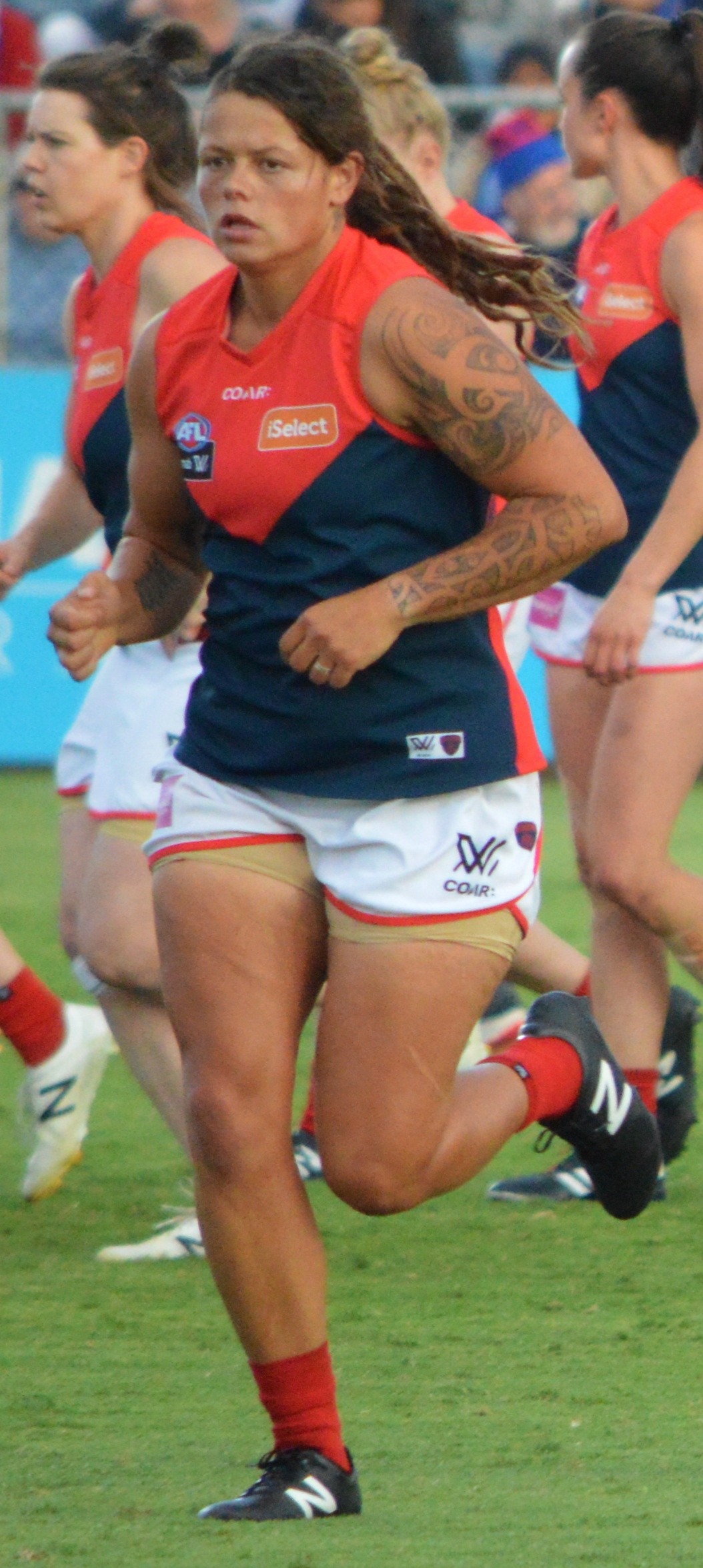
Richelle Cranston playing for Melbourne in 2017

Currently on an AFLW senior list

| Player | AFLW Years* | AFLW Matches* | AFLW Goals* | Connections to New Zealand, References |
|---|---|---|---|---|
| Keyshia Matenga | 2026- | 0 | 0 | Raised in Waikato |
| Grace Brooker | 2025 | 5 | 2 | Born Rangiora, raised in Christchurch |
| Hannah Hillman | 2022– | - | - | Parent |
| Abbey Dowrick | 2022- | 20 | 2 | Parent |
| Lucy Single | 2021– | 33 | 5 | Raised in New Zealand up to age of 10 |
| Indy Tahau | 2021– | 8 | 0 | Family |
| Makaela Tuhakaraina | 2021– | 16 | 5 | Born and raised |
| Najwa Allen | 2020– | 44 | 0 | Parent |
| Dee Heslop | 2020– | 44 | 0 | Born and raised in Auckland up to the age of 10 |
| Vaomua Laloifi | 2020– | 15 | 0 | Born in Samoa, raised in New Zealand up to the age of 16 |
| Poppy Kelly | 2020– | 28 | 1 | Both parents, Maori mother |
| Serena Gibbs | 2020– | 8 | 4 | Parent |
| Mhicca Carter | 2020-2021 | 1 | 0 | Born and raised in Blenheim up to the age of 20 |
| Jesse Tawhiao-Wardlaw | 2019– | 59 | 55 | Born and raised in Ashburton to the age of 4. Aucklander mother and Christchurch father. Maori. |
| Angelique Stannett | 2019– | 57 | 4 | Born and raised up to the age of 3 |
| Celine Moody | 2019– | 42 | 7 | Parent |
| McKenzie Dowrick | 2019- | 16 | 5 | Parent |
| Sabreena Duffy | 2019– | 29 | 34 | Parent |
| Brooke Walker | 2019– | 37 | 14 | Born and raised in Christchurch up to the age of 14 |
| Kristy Stratton | 2018– | 21 | 6 | Parent |
| Rheanne Lugg | 2018–2021 | 15 | 3 | Parent |
| Stevie-Lee Thompson | 2017– | 72 | 24 | Maori parents, raised in Hawke's Bay from age of 4 |
| Tahlia Randall | 2017– | 76 | 43 | Mother from Titirangi |
| Jasmine Garner | 2017- | 75 | 64 | Parent |
| Breann Moody | 2017- | 38 | 4 | Parent |
| Richelle Cranston | 2017– | 34 | 17 | Maori, raised in New Zealand |
| Lauren Pearce | 2017– | 68 | 10 | Father |
| Jacinda Barclay | 2017–2020 | 23 | 11 | Both parents |
| Moana Hope | 2017–2019 | 20 | 23 | Maori mother |
| Jade Ransfield | 2016–2017 | - | - | Born, moved to Australia as child |

== See also ==
- New Zealand AFL
- List of New Zealand born AFL players

== Books ==
1. de Moore, Greg; Hess, Rob; Nicholson, Matthew; Stewart, Bob (2021). Australia's Game: The History of Australian Football. Hardie Grant Books. ISBN 9781-74379-657-3.
