= Frank Marlow =

Australian football administrator

Frank Marlow (10 January 1869 – 13 August 1935) was a long-serving administrator of Australian rules football in South Australia; as secretary of South Adelaide Football Club and of the South Australian National Football League (SANFL).

== History ==
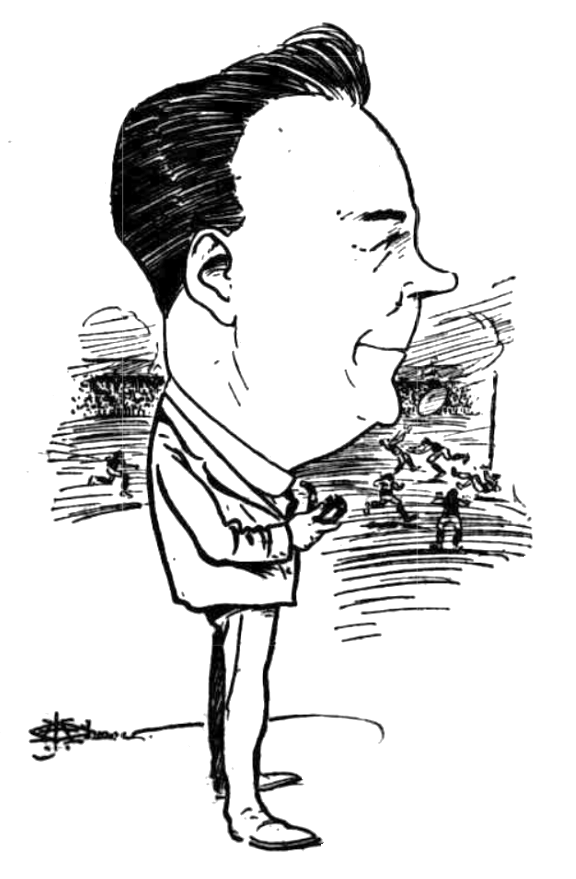
caricature by J. H. Chinner

Marlow was born in Adelaide, a son of William Thomas Marlow. As a young man he moved to North Adelaide, and played football with the local team, "The Victorians", whose ground was on Montefiore Hill.

He moved to the south side of the city, and joined the South Adelaide club, serving as treasurer from 1892 and secretary from 1894, when he was nominated South's delegate to the SANFL, to 1911.

Those were "glory days" for South Adelaide; it was such a well-run club it attracted top players from all over Adelaide, and they won so consistently that in 1899 an "electorate" system was introduced and their players scattered across the metropolitan area: in the 1910 season Port Adelaide was the only team not captained by an ex-South player.

In 1911 he helped out as assistant secretary of the League during the illness of secretary Sullivan, (Note: Roger Florence Charles Sullivan (c. 1872–1923), a capable and well-liked Secretary 1903–1911 of the SANFA and the SANFL during development of the latter. This was a difficult period, not least because of controversy over the unequal distribution of gate receipts to Victorian and South Australian teams when they played each other.) and was called upon at the last moment to organise the 1911 Carnival (series of playoffs resulting in the Grand Final), snatching a triumphant success from an expected shambles. He succeeded H. W. A. Miller as League secretary, serving from 1913 to 1935, the year of his death. it became a full-time position from 1926.

Marlow was reported as not having missed a meeting of any board or committee with which he was associated. A devotee of "Father Nicotine", and a man of genial and thoughtful disposition, he was noted as a supporter of the work of umpires.

== Last days ==
Marlow was a member of a contingent which travelled to Melbourne for a game on 3 August 1935 and returned by the "Melbourne Express". Like many of the party, he "caught a chill" in Melbourne but "soldiered on", finalising arrangements for the League games of the coming Saturday. Despite a last-minute rally he died at his home. His remains were interred at the West Terrace Cemetery on Wednesday 14 August; pallbearers were the secretaries of the eight League clubs. Players at all games on the following Saturday wore black armbands and spectators observed a minute's silence before the first bounce.

T. S. Hill, secretary of Norwood Football Club, took over as secretary pro tem, and served in that position with conspicuous success until 1963.

A memorial fund was instituted in his name to pay for his tombstone, unveiled in December 1935.

== Recognition ==
Marlow was made a life member of the Australian Football Council in 1930.

Tributes were published in The News from

- T. S. O'Halloran, chairman of the SA league
- Eric Tassie, president of the Australian National Football Council
- William Thomas Martin OBE, Superintendent of Primary Education
- John Frederick "Fred" Bennett (died 14 July 1949), chairman of the North Adelaide Football Club
- John Joseph "Johnny" Quinn, umpire
- William Enoch Coombs, chairman of South Adelaide Football Club
- Cyril Graham Tolley, chairman of Glenelg Football Club
- John Kevin Alderman, chairman of Sturt Football Club
- Charles Edward Tunney, chairman of West Adelaide Football Club
- Arthur John Swain, of the Port Adelaide Football Club committee
- Arthur James Graham, chairman of West Torrens Football Club
- Theo Heidenreich, vice-president of Norwood Football Club
- S. G. B. "Sam" Wilson, secretary of the South Australian National Football Association (Note: Note the distinction between SANFA and SANFL, the secretary of which was Tom Hill.)
- Reginald Allan Nelson, secretary of the South Australian Public Schools' Amateur Sports Association
- L. H. McBrien, secretary of the Victorian Football League
- Con Hickey, secretary of the Australian National Football Council
- Wally Stooke, president of the West Australian National Football League

The Marlow medal, presented by the SA National Football Umpires' Association for the fairest and outstanding player in the Metropolitan High Schools' Sports Association, was named for him.

His name was added to the South Australian Football Hall of Fame in 2002.

When the VFL became the AFL, Marlow was one of the first SANFL nominations to the AFL Hall of Fame, but not inscribed.

Caricatures of Marlow by Pearce and Chinner (above) have been published in Adelaide newspapers.

== Family ==
Marlow married Agnes Jane Gibbons ( – 11 January 1939) in September 1892. They had a home on Gilles Street, Adelaide. No mention of children has been found.

Alfred Cleveland "Alf" "Shaver" Marlow (1872 – 10 December 1943), South Adelaide footballer, was a brother.
