= Australian rules football schism (1938–1949) =

Split between the Victorian Football League and the Victorian Football Association

From 1938 to 1949, there was a schism in the rules and governance of Australian rules football, primarily in the sport's traditional heartland of Melbourne, and to lesser extents in North West Tasmania and parts of regional Victoria. The schism existed between Melbourne's pre-eminent league, the Victorian Football League (VFL), and its secondary league, the Victorian Football Association (VFA), and began in 1938, when the VFA introduced several rule changes, most notably legalising throwing of the football in general play. In the context of VFA history, this is referred to as the throw-pass era.

The changed rules helped to speed up the game, and promoted more run-and-carry play in an era which had previously been dominated by a long kicking style. Additionally, the VFA ended its player transfer agreement with the VFL, and aggressively recruited star players from the VFL. These changes gave the VFA for the first time in many years an on-field product which could compete with the VFL for public interest, and it made the 1940s one of the most successful periods in the VFA's history. By the mid-1940s, the VFA had copyrighted its rules, and was considered to be playing its own distinct code of Australian rules football.

The VFA's actions created a division in the administrative structure of the sport in Victoria. Throughout the 1940s, the VFL and VFA worked towards ending the schism, as they both believed that a single controlling body playing under a uniform set of rules was in the best interests of football as a whole. Over several years, the VFL and VFA unsuccessfully negotiated options, including for the two competitions to be amalgamated into one. The schism ended after the 1949 season, when the VFA accepted the national standard rules, in exchange for receiving its own seat on the Australian National Football Council, which ultimately gave it a voice in the administration of the game at the national level. Although the throw-pass itself did not survive beyond the schism, other innovations from the throw-pass era helped to shape the national rules of the game.

== Background ==
Victorian clubs during the schism
VFL clubs	VFA clubs
Carlton; Collingwood; Essendon; Fitzroy; Footscray; Geelong; Hawthorn; Melbourne; North Melbourne; Richmond; South Melbourne; St Kilda	Brighton; Brunswick; Camberwell; Coburg; Northcote; Oakleigh; Port Melbourne; Prahran; Preston; Sandringham; Williamstown; Yarraville

Australian rules football had been played in Victoria since 1858, and was initially administered in an ad hoc manner by the active clubs, who agreed upon rules and administrative matters through informal meetings of club secretaries. In 1877, the Victorian Football Association (VFA) was established to provide formal and binding administration of the game in Victoria. By 1888, the VFA had brought a formal structure to its on-field competition, including the system under which the premiership was decided, and thus the VFA was serving as both the game's administrative body and as its top senior competition in Victoria.

In October 1896, eight of the VFA's thirteen clubs seceded and established the Victorian Football League (VFL). The VFL comprised the strongest clubs in Melbourne, in large part because its clubs were based in the more densely populated inner suburbs where potential gate takings were higher, while the VFA's clubs were generally based further from the city centre; thus the VFL became the pre-eminent football competition and administrative body in Victoria. The strongest VFA clubs regularly sought admission to the more lucrative VFL, and four clubs gained admission over the following decades (Richmond in 1908; and Footscray, Hawthorn and North Melbourne in 1925), on each occasion quelling a brief resurgence in the VFA's popularity. As a matter of comparison of the two competitions' strengths, the average home-and-away crowds in the 1937 season were around 14,300 in the VFL and 2,400 in the VFA. Both the VFL and VFA played all matches on Saturday afternoons at the time, so the two were in direct competition with each other for spectators. It was widely acknowledged that the VFL was the higher standard competition, and even the VFA executive was prepared to acknowledge that only a handful of VFA players had the ability to succeed as senior VFL players.

The responsibility for administration of the game at the national level fell at this time to the Australian National Football Council (ANFC). Formed in 1906, the ANFC comprised one delegate from each state, and later added one from Canberra and one representing amateur football nationwide. The ANFC was the custodian of the official laws of the game, which all of its affiliated competitions were required to use. The council's purpose was to provide a united control structure for the sport, and to promote the interests of the game as a whole; as part of this, it took levies from the southern states and distributed grants to the northern states to help them develop the game in rugby territory. Victoria was represented on the ANFC by the VFL. The VFA was not part of the ANFC; but, it had a formal relationship with the VFL governed by an agreement signed between them in 1931, and the terms of that agreement indirectly brought the VFA under the ANFC's influence.

== Establishment of the throw-pass code ==
The mid-1930s had been a period of declining popularity for football in Victoria. Exacerbated by the Great Depression, both the VFA and VFL were enduring financial problems, such that some of the weaker VFL teams were being kept afloat only by the dividends they received from finals gates. The VFA was also dealing with off-field threats from several councils which were applying pressure on their clubs to improve gate takings or face losing their grounds to soccer or rugby clubs.

The VFA decided that it would make a series of rule changes to make the game more spectacular. The first set of recommendations was made by an appointed committee of umpires in early October 1937, and the final decision on which rules to include was made at a meeting of club delegates in February 1938.

The rule changes which were made were:

- Throwing the ball – the VFA legalised throwing as a means of disposal in general play, provided the throw was with two hands and both hands were below shoulder height. The primary intention of the rule was to provide a faster and less skillful means of disposing of the football than kicking or handpassing, to make it easier for players to clear the ball from scrimmages which tended to slow down the game during the 1930s. A secondary benefit of the rule was that flick-passing – a handpassing style in which the ball is propelled with an open hand instead of the traditional closed fist – had increased in usage since being legalised in 1934, but it blurred the line between handpassing and throwing such that it was difficult for umpires to police consistently; by legalising throwing the ball, this source of inconsistency was removed. It was a bold change, since throwing the ball had been illegal throughout the history of Australian rules football, dating back to the Melbourne Rules of 1859; although the idea itself was not new, and had been proposed in various forums including the ANFC without being accepted since as early as 1911. This form of disposal became known as a throw-pass – a term which in many sports would appear tautological, but reflected its distinction from the other styles of handpass. Strictly speaking, the throw was not a new form of disposal; rather, the definition of a handpass was expanded to include throwing.
- Holding the ball – amendments were made to the existing holding the ball rule. Under 1930s ANFC rules, a player would be penalised for holding the ball if he was tackled while in possession, unless he immediately kicked, handpassed or dropped the ball. In practice, players would usually drop the ball upon being tackled, which meant that a scrimmage could easily form around the ball and the tackled player; it also meant that a player could drop the ball, try to earn a holding-the-man free kick if the tackler did not let him go, then quickly pick the ball up again if the tackler did let him go. This was difficult for umpires to police consistently, and it was the major cause of scrimmages which had both slowed down the game and had contributed to a rise in rough play during the 1930s. The VFA amended the rule by eliminating the provision for the player to drop the ball: he would now have to kick, handpass or throw the ball, but would be penalised if he dropped it, meaning that the ball would be cleared away from the spot of the tackle, making it more difficult for a scrimmage to form around it. It is noted that the ANFC had previously tried to introduce this same rule (excluding the provision to throw the ball) in 1930 and had found it unsuccessful at reducing scrimmages; but the VFA believed that combining this rule with the ability to throw the ball – a much easier form of disposal than a traditional handpass – would be more successful at achieving this aim.
- Boundary throw-in – the boundary throw-in was reintroduced to the game. Under the new rules, the boundary umpire would throw the ball back into play to a neutral ruck contest after the ball went out of bounds, unless: the field umpire deemed that the ball had been forced out deliberately; or, if the ball went out of bounds from a kick-in after a behind without another player touching it – in which cases a free kick would be awarded. Players contesting boundary throw-ins were made to initially stand apart from each other and were not permitted to interfere with each other. Re-introducing the boundary throw-in was a return to a set of rules which had prevailed prior to 1925. Since 1925, ANFC rules had dictated that a free kick be awarded against the last team to play the ball before it went out of bounds under any circumstances; the VFL had voted in favour of the change, but it had quickly come to be unpopular among players and spectators, and Victoria had since unsuccessfully agitated for it to be repealed. The change opened the wings and flanks up to more play: under the ANFC rules, play had in general been much more direct down the centre of the field to avoid the risk of turning over possession by putting the ball out of bounds, but the return of the boundary throw-in lowered the risk of playing down the boundary lines. It also simplified the umpire's job, as he no longer needed to determine which player was the last to play the ball before it went out of bounds, which was often difficult if the ball was being contested at the time.
- Free kicks paid for fouls committed after a disposal – the VFA introduced the rule which today is known as a downfield free kick, although that name was not in contemporary use. Under the rule, if a player was fouled after disposing of the ball, a free kick would be awarded to the nearest teammate at the spot where the ball landed, instead of to the fouled player at the spot of the foul.
- Transfer of free kicks from injured players – a provision was introduced for a free kick to be taken by a teammate if the player who was originally to take the free kick was injured and unable to take it. Under national rules, a ball-up would be called under these circumstances.

Another key rule which was not included amongst the original 1938 changes, but which was introduced during the 1939 season, was:

- Fifteen yard penalty: The VFA introduced a fifteen-yard penalty for offences by the man on the mark. Specifically, when a player was awarded a mark or a free kick, if his opponent cribbed over the mark or wasted time by refusing to return the ball directly to him, the umpire could move the spot of the mark ten to fifteen yards closer to goal, and could apply multiple such penalties until the opponent complied. Cribbing over the mark, sometimes by as far as five to ten yards, was a much disliked but commonplace feature of the game by 1938, but there was no on-field penalty available to the umpire to manage it; time-wasting was a reportable offence, but reports were seldom enforced; so, the VFA introduced the rule to give the umpire the means to more directly control what had become an unattractive feature of the game.

Overall, the committee believed the changes would retain the speed, long kicking and high marking which were thought to be the game's most attractive features, but reduce on-field congestion and roughness and make the rules simpler for the umpire to apply. Collectively, the rules became known as the VFA rules, Association rules, more informally as the throw-pass rules, or pejoratively as throw-ball; the traditional rules were known as the national rules, League rules or ANFC rules.

=== Rejected rules ===
The original proposal put forward by the rules committee had gone significantly further. Additional rules which were put forward in 1938, but were rejected by the club delegates, were:

- Reducing the number of players in the run-on team from 18 to 16, to open up more space on the field and reduce congestion. It was envisioned that the ruck and ruck-rover would be the positions eliminated. This change was defeated by a single vote, with six clubs in favour and six clubs opposed.
- Replacing the centre bounce with a kick-off from twenty yards behind the centre-line by the team which had just been scored upon. This rule was included amongst the original proposals because, had the rucks and ruck-rovers been removed from the run-on team, it was felt that it would no longer make sense to retain the traditional centre bounce; and it was thought that faster restarts from a kick-off could enhance the game as a tactical spectacle. Once the proposal to reduce the number of players had been rejected, this rule change was summarily rejected.
- As part of the rules to re-introduce boundary throw-ins, it was proposed that only two players from each team – the rover and the nearest-placed positional player – be permitted to contest the throw-in, with the umpire directing other players away, in order to reduce the potential for scrimmages to form at the contest. When the reduction in the number of players was defeated, the boundary throw-in rule was amended to remove this aspect of the proposal.
- Awarding three points if the ball hits the goal post, instead of the standard one point.
- Giving umpires the power to order players off to control rough play.

== Early years of throw-pass football (1938–1941) ==
=== Effect on the game ===
Give the Association throw-pass to a team of 18 experts and the crowd will never stop roaring from bell to bell. The game would be played with the speed of an ice hockey match and the precision of a chess match.

— Future Hall of Fame sportswriter Hector de Lacy

Observers of the new rules quickly lauded them for having their intended effects of speeding up the game, reducing congestion and making the rules easier to police consistently. The Australasian sportswriter Reginald Wilmot (writing under his pseudonym Old Boy) noted that the rules helped to reward the ball-winner, compared with the old holding the ball rules which favoured the tackler. Many pundits had been worried that throw-passing would lead to a reduction in long kicking and high marking, but noted that in practice, throw-passes were seldom over a distance greater than ten yards, and long kicking remained prominent. VFL champion player and coach Dan Minogue lauded the boundary throw-in rule as encouraging more contested football near the boundary line, rather than seeing players content to watch the ball roll out of bounds knowing that they would receive a free kick. Port Adelaide secretary Charles Hayter commented that by encouraging more play along the boundary lines, the rules brought the action closer to the spectators. Several players liked that the reduced number of scrimmages would reduce the risk of injury, and a reduction in rough play and thuggery was noted.

Any mug can throw a ball. Bunton is a champion, and he is never in difficulties in disposing of the ball, and the standard of efficiency of players must be increased rather than that the code be altered to meet a lower standard of play.

— WANFL and future ANFC president Walter Stooke at the 1938 ANFC conference

Not all were convinced about the merits of the rules, particularly the throw-pass, after seeing them in action. Many were still concerned that over time the ease of throwing the ball would reduce long kicking and high marking. Champion North Adelaide full-forward Ken Farmer feared that in the extreme case it could result in a game played by seventeen basketballers and a full-forward. Several observers thought the rule made the game too easy, and while that catered well to VFA players, the higher standard of players in the top state leagues could be equally effective with a traditional handpass or flick-pass as they could be with a throw-pass. South Australian sportswriter Steve McKee feared that allowing the throw-pass would rob the game of its individuality, which could affect its ability to compete with and distinguish itself from rival sports in the long term; and that the game would become dominated by smaller, faster players, making it impossible for larger or slower players to have a successful top-level career. Wilmot lamented that the agility and evasion displayed by VFL players to avoid tackles was largely absent from the VFA code, with players instead able to execute a simple throw to avoid a tackle. Some observers saw the reduction in rough play as a disadvantage of the new code rather than an advantage, dismissing the VFA code as a "sissy" version of Australian rules football.

A statistical analysis of the 1938 VFA grand final between Brunswick and Brighton was published and compared with the averages from ten VFL matches around the same time to illustrate the effect that the rule changes had on making the game more non-stop. It confirmed that the number of kicks had remained steady or even increased as a result of the changes, with a total of 650 kicks and 173 marks recorded in the VFA grand final compared with an average of 596 kicks and 160 marks in the VFL matches. It also showed that the ability to throw the ball had more than doubled the use of handpassing, with a total of 160 throw-passes recorded in the VFA grand final compared with only 76 handpasses in the VFL games; this extent of handpassing was unheard of under the ANFC rules, and it was not until the 1979 VFL season more than four decades later that VFL matches would average so many handpasses per game. There were only six ball-ups in the VFA grand final, and 38 boundary throw-ins, and the game was overall considered a very good spectacle. The average score per team per game increased by almost three goals, from 84.7 to 100.5, in the first season under throw-pass rules.

Crowds at VFA games enjoyed a substantial increase under throw-pass rules. Across the first ten rounds of 1938, the average attendance at VFA games was 3,600, compared with 2,400 for the corresponding rounds in 1937. Another 22% increase in crowds was enjoyed in 1939, and club memberships likewise increased. The VFA took advantage of this new found interest by extending the season from sixteen games to twenty in 1939, moving the grand final to the Saturday after the VFL grand final and – with considerable off-field political effort – securing the Melbourne Cricket Ground as its venue; with a larger venue and no VFL counter-attraction, the 1939 VFA grand final between Brunswick and Williamstown attracted the all-time VFA record attendance of 47,098, despite drizzly weather. Many clubs enjoyed record home crowds over the next few years. Despite the increased crowds, overall attendances were still only about a quarter of those attracted by the VFL, which averaged between 15,000 and 16,000 to home-and-away games in 1938 and 1939.

=== Promotion ===
The new rules generated the interest of other competitions, and to promote its new code, VFA teams played exhibition matches, including in Geelong, Camperdown and Frankston. An important match between Camberwell and a composite team of the South Australian Amateur Football League (which usually played League rules) was played in August 1938 at the Adelaide Oval to give South Australian officials the opportunity to see the new rules in action.

The VFA also sought media coverage to promote its new code. From 1938 to 1940, it paid £125 to radio network 3XY to broadcast matches, before ending the high cost deal; it tried unsuccessfully trying to find better deals which would deliver revenue over subsequent years. The VFA had a strong ally throughout the schism in sportswriter Hec de Lacy of The Sporting Globe, who often wrote favourably about the new code.

=== Response of other competitions ===
Several small competitions in Victoria, usually the secondary competitions in their district, followed the VFA's lead and adopted the throw-pass rules for the 1938 season, even before seeing them in action: these included the Sale District Football Association, the VFA Sub-Districts Association, and the Bendigo Football Association. Interest in the new code spread, and by 1939 the Bairnsdale and Bruthen District League and the Hume Highway Football Association had adopted the rules. The Yallourn District Amateur Association had adopted the rules by 1941. Many other leagues held votes to determine whether or not to switch codes. More significantly, many of Victoria's schools associations also adopted the VFA's rules over its first few years, giving the new code a strong development ground for the future: the Secondary Schools adopted them in 1938, the Technical Schools adopted them in 1939 and the Public Schools adopted them in 1940.

The new rules also gained penetration in Tasmania, particularly in North West Tasmania. Tasmanian administrators had long advocated introducing throwing the ball, having unsuccessfully raised the motion at several ANFC meetings since 1911, so that there was interest in the new code in Tasmania was natural. The first competition there to adopt them was the North Western Football Association, the second-tier competition on Tasmania's north-western coast, which adopted the rules halfway through the 1938 season. It was a boon to the NWFA, and in 1939 its size increased from five clubs to nine. The smaller nearby Wilmot and Chudleigh Football Associations also adopted the new rules, and a motion in 1940 to adopt the rules in the Darwin Football Association, also based in North West Tasmania, failed by a single vote. However, North West Tasmania's preeminent senior competition, the North West Football Union, remained loyal to the national code.

In October 1938, the ANFC met and discussed whether or not to alter the national rules to incorporate the VFA's changes. The motion to legalise the throw-pass nationally was once again raised by Tasmania, but it again lapsed after no other state would second it. The delegates from New South Wales and Canberra were concerned that the change would make the game unable to distinguish itself from the rival rugby codes which were popular in their regions; and Victoria and Western Australia were strongly opposed, believing it would take the difficulty and skill out of the game; South Australia, which had expressed favour for the throw-pass, also declined to second the motion, preferring to see the rule in action in the VFA for at least another year before making a commitment.

At the same conference in October 1938, the ANFC agreed to adopt two of the VFA's other key rules which had a significant effect on gameplay: altering the holding the ball rule to eliminate the provision for a player to drop the ball when tackled; and re-introducing the boundary throw-in whenever the ball went out of bounds, except when put out deliberately. Both rule changes have become fundamental to Australian rules football for the next century: the modern holding the ball rule, as it applies to a player who has had an opportunity to dispose of the ball prior to being tackled, is practically unchanged from the 1939 interpretation; and other than the introduction in 1970 of a free kick for kicking out of bounds on the full, it was not until 2026 that an automatic free kick was re-established against the last disposal out of bounds.

The rules the VFA had introduced to curb rough or time-wasting play were not immediately adopted by the ANFC, but were adopted over the following decades. The ANFC adopted the downfield free kick into its rules in 1945, and it adopted the fifteen-yard penalty for time-wasting or cribbing over the mark in 1954; both rules remain part of modern football, except that the distance of the fifteen-yard penalty was extended to fifty metres in 1988.

=== Effect on full-forwards ===
The change to the out-of-bounds rule in the national code is often considered to have brought an end to the era of dominant full-forwards which had existed during the 1930s: century goalkickers such as Gordon Coventry and Bob Pratt in the VFL, Frank Seymour in the VFA, Ken Farmer in South Australia, and George Doig in Western Australia had been common during the 1930s, but they were decidedly less common over the next thirty years, generally put down to the fact that play could be more safely directed along the boundary lines, bringing the forward pockets and half-forward flankers into play and resulting in a wider spread of goalkickers.

In spite of this, the four VFA seasons played between 1939 and 1945 under throw-pass rules featured some of the most dominant goalkicking displays by full-forwards in the game's history. George Hawkins (Prahran) won the 1939 goalkicking title with 164 goals; Ted Freyer (Port Melbourne) won the 1940 title with 157 goals; Bob Pratt (Coburg) won the 1941 title with 183 goals; and Ron Todd (Williamstown) won the 1945 title with 188 goals – all of which exceeded the then-record of 152 goals set under national rules by George Doig in 1934. Many other high totals were recorded in those four seasons. Sportswriters noted that Freyer's dominance in 1940 came from Port Melbourne adopting a straight-down-the-middle style of play in spite of changed boundary rules; and Williamstown forward Harry Vallence felt that full forwards benefited from half-forwards being freer to deliver high quality kicks instead of hurried, errant kicks out of scrimmages and packs; but it was also surmised that the sheer skill of those particular forwards playing in the much-lower-standard VFA teams, particularly the war-weakened teams from 1940 until 1945, was a major contributor to their dominance. These historic goalkicking feats were confined to those four seasons; outside that period, the most goals scored in a VFA season during the throw-pass era was 114, by Todd in 1946.

== Player transfers ==
I hereby apply to be registered with the Victorian Football League as a player of the [club name], and, in the event of the League accepting this application, and in consideration thereof, I agree to be bound by the rules and regulations of the League, and I undertake not to play football in any competition or match or series of matches organised or controlled or conducted by any other club, association or body in the State of Victoria while I am a registered player of the League, or within two years of my ceasing to be a registered player of the League, without first obtaining a clearance from the said [club name] and a permit from the League so to do.

— Excerpt from the 1930s VFL players' agreement relating to transfers.

=== Permit reciprocity ===
Within any given football competition, a player wishing to switch to a new club was required to obtain a clearance from his old club and a permit from the league's permit committee; the competition could enforce these transfer rules by issuing fines to or docking premiership points from clubs who fielded players without a valid clearance. However, these rules were inherently enforceable only within the same competition; to make a permit and clearance system enforceable between different competitions, separate legal agreements were needed between them under which each competition agreed to penalise its own clubs if they fielded players from the other competition without a clearance. Amongst the major state leagues, the ANFC provided a framework for permit reciprocity agreements as a condition of affiliation; but, since the VFA was not ANFC-affiliated, a separate agreement was needed between the VFA and VFL if clearances were to be recognised between them. Permit reciprocity was not always in the best interests of both competitions, and so such agreements had existed on-and-off between them for the previous few decades: one such agreement lasted from 1913 until 1918; the next was signed in 1923, and was broken in early 1925 as part of the competitions' 1925 expansions; and the agreement that was current at the start of the schism had been signed in 1931; it was then extended in 1934, as part of the conditional support given by the VFL to the VFA in resolving the central ground dispute which almost derailed the 1934 VFA season. The 1931 agreement was more extensive than simply covering permit reciprocity; it was intended to foster co-operation between the two competitions, and provide somewhat unified control of football in Victoria.

The agreement gave clubs from both the VFL and VFA much control over its ability to release players, but in practice through the 1930s it was common for the best players from the VFA to be recruited to the VFL, and mostly for fringe or seconds players to be cleared back to the VFA; transfer fees were sometimes also paid by the VFL to the VFA clubs. This left the VFA in an increasingly weakened position, with its best junior players generally being cleared to VFL clubs early in their careers. In late 1936, there was discussion that the VFL might reduce the maximum size of its playing list, something which might free up more high quality players to transfer back to the VFA, but by the end of 1937 this did not eventuate. The VFA clubs' frustrations at this continual loss of its players was a contributing factor to the start of the schism.

=== Termination of the agreement ===
On 15 November 1937, the VFA voted to end the 1931 agreement. The VFA recognised that it would be impractical to maintain a unified control agreement if it were playing under such different rules. The VFA had also grown frustrated with what it saw as a lack of assistance from the VFL, particularly as the VFA had been struggling in 1936 and 1937, when it felt that the agreement compelled the VFL to make its best endeavours to help – although the VFL, in its defence, was having its own difficulties at the same time. Overall, the VFA felt that it would be better able to manage its own interests if not bound by the agreement. With the agreement terminated, clubs now had the freedom to recruit players from the VFL to the VFA, and vice versa, without clearances and would have no fear of legal recourse.

The situation was different for players. A player who crossed without a clearance was in breach of his contract with his original league, as the contract prohibited playing in any other football competition in Victoria without a clearance; this clause was valid regardless of whether or not a permit reciprocity agreement existed between those competitions. Both the VFA and the VFL gave three-year suspensions to any of their players who crossed to their rival without a clearance, but these suspensions were valid only in the original competition and did not prevent the player from playing and earning money at his new club. In practice, this meant that a player could switch competitions freely, but that as long as the schism persisted it would almost certainly be a permanent switch, as his suspension would prevent him from returning unless he stood out of all football for three years. The VFL considered its legal options to seek further injunctions against players who crossed to the VFA without a clearance; but it was not certain that the relevant clause in the contract would hold up in court, and decided not to proceed with legal action.

Although players were permitted to cross without a clearance, not all transfers occurred in this manner, particularly in the first years of the schism; nevertheless, the changes gave players a stronger bargaining chip in negotiations. If a player demonstrated a willingness to accept a VFL suspension by crossing to the VFA without a clearance, then it was in his VFL club's best interests to grant the clearance in the hope that he might later return, rather than allow him to take a suspension which would prevent that from occurring. Not all clubs followed this pragmatic approach: South Melbourne, for example, made a point of refusing clearances to players unless they had given the club ten years of service, and it consequently lost many players without clearances. Many players still sought clearances, as they were keen to keep their options to return to the VFL open, and some turned down big VFA offers if their clearances weren't granted; Jack Dyer, for example, was denied a clearance to Yarraville in 1940, and he opted not to cross without a clearance because he harboured ambitions to return to be playing-coach of Richmond.

There could be lucrative financial incentives for star players to cross from the VFL to the VFA. VFL payment laws, known as the "Coulter Laws", were very prescriptive, placing a limit on match payments at £4 per match in 1938; and prohibiting the payment of lump sums either as inducements for players, or to their clubs to secure clearances. The VFA had no such limitations. Additionally, some clubs, such as Collingwood, had strict internal policies to pay all players equally, making it impossible for star VFL players to negotiate for higher pay even within the limitations of the Coulter Laws. This meant that VFA clubs had the ability to recruit a small number of the VFL's best players by offering much more than they could or would be offered in the VFL. At the time, with many having lived through the struggles of the Great Depression, and with football revenues increasing in its aftermath, it was this which initially drew some of the game's star players to the new code. The VFA's recruitment drive received a fillip when Coulter Law payments were further reduced to £1 per match during 1940 as an austerity and patriotic measure in the early phases of World War II, and the VFL promptly restored to £3 per match in 1941 under the threat of further player defections – including a major dispute at Geelong which saw five of its players depart en masse for the VFA.

The end of the agreement also gave VFA players the freedom to cross to the VFL. A capable rank-and-file player would earn more in base player payments under the Coulter Laws than he would earn in the VFA, if he could command a regular senior place in the VFL – meaning that the exodus of young players to the VFL which had affected the VFA throughout the 1930s was not curbed by the changes. However, players who switched without a clearance risked being stuck in the VFL seconds with no ability to return to the VFA seniors if they weren't good enough for regular senior selection. Andy Angwin was the first player to transfer to the VFL without a clearance, switching from Port Melbourne to Hawthorn in 1938.

=== Notable League players to switch codes ===
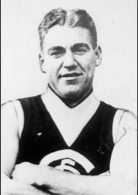
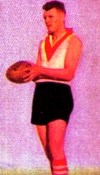
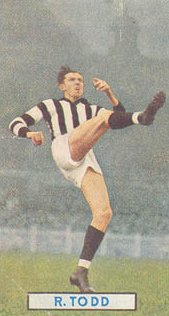
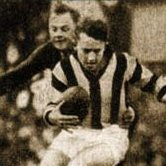
VFL superstars Laurie Nash, Bob Pratt, Ron Todd and Des Fothergill all crossed without clearances to play throw-pass football in the VFA.

The VFA's new code gained significant publicity and credibility when it was able to convince VFL players, including some of the best players of the era and even some club captains, to defect. There were four particularly significant transfers involving superstar players:

- Laurie Nash (South Melbourne to Camberwell in 1938): Nash was the first VFL player to announce that he would switch for big money without a clearance, doing so at the start of 1938 for £8 per week (equivalent to A$810 in 2022), double the payments allowed by the Coulter Laws; also a former Test cricketer and star fast bowler at district level, Nash earned £3 per week (equivalent to A$304 in 2022) during summer to play sub-district cricket for Camberwell as part of the deal, at a time when no player would have been paid such a sum to play cricket at such a low level. An enormous recruiting coup for the VFA, Nash was a dominant key-position player at both ends of the ground, and many observers and opponents at the time considered him the greatest footballer of his era. Aged 27 when he transferred, Nash was still in the prime of his career. He played with Camberwell for four seasons from 1938 until 1941; he finished second in both the Recorder Cup and V.F.A. Medal in 1939, and across his career with Camberwell kicked 418 goals in 74 games, including 141 goals in 1940.
- Bob Pratt (South Melbourne to Coburg in 1940): Pratt was one of the VFL's dominant and most spectacular marking full-forwards of the early 1930s, and he was considered the best full-forward of his time by many of his contemporaries. As of 2025, he still jointly holds the record for most goals in a VFL season (150 goals in 1934), and he was one of the inaugural legends of the Australian Football Hall of Fame. Pratt walked out on South Melbourne at the end of 1939; he sought a clearance to VFL club Carlton in 1940, and, when it was refused, he transferred to Coburg without a clearance. Aged 27 at the time of his transfer, he played at Coburg for two seasons until the war. He played 40 games and kicked 263 goals for Coburg, and he led the VFA with a then-record 183 goals in the 1941 season.
- Ron Todd (Collingwood to Williamstown in 1940): Todd had established himself as Collingwood's full-forward at the age of 22 in 1938 after the retirement of long-time full forward Gordon Coventry, and he was VFL's leading goalkicker in 1938 and 1939, kicking 120 and 121 goals, respectively. A spectacular aerialist with a strong lead, and accurate with both snap shots and long set shots for goal, Todd was an exciting drawcard for Collingwood. Laurie Nash and Dick Reynolds both rated Todd as second only to Pratt as the greatest full-forwards they had ever seen. He signed with Williamstown at the start of 1940 and crossed without a clearance; at the age of 23, he was the highest-paid footballer in Australia, earning a reported £500 flat (equivalent to A$47,627 in 2022) plus £5 per week (equivalent to A$476 in 2022) for a three-year deal, more than ten times his wage at Collingwood. Todd became a significant drawcard for Williamstown, drawing ground record crowds and a substantial increase in memberships for the club. He played the remainder of his career with Williamstown until his retirement at the end of 1949. He kicked 672 goals for Williamstown in 141 matches, and kicked an all-time VFA season record 188 goals in the 1945 season. His departure from Collingwood was the most acrimonious transfer of the throw-pass era, damaging his legacy and reputation at the club for more than sixty years;
- Des Fothergill (Collingwood to Williamstown in 1941). A young goalkicking midfielder and half-forward, Fothergill had been a joint winner of the VFL's Brownlow Medal in 1940, polling a then-record 32 votes. Aged only 20, he crossed to Williamstown without a clearance at the beginning of 1941, and dominated the competition, winning the Recorder Cup and VFA Medal with 62 votes – a record number of votes which was never broken in Division 1. Fothergill had signed with Williamstown until the end of 1944, but due to the war played there only in 1941.

Other notable VFL players to switch to the VFA, with or without clearances, were:

- Harry Vallence (Carlton to Williamstown in 1939). Vallence played with Carlton for more than a decade and kicked 722 career goals, which stood as a club record until the 1990s. He first sought a clearance to serve as playing coach of Williamstown at the start of 1938, having been offered double what he could have earned under the Coulter Laws, but Carlton refused to clear him and Vallence opted to stay for another year. He obtained a clearance the following year. Aged 33 when he transferred, Vallence was still a strong player, was Williamstown's leading goalkicker from full-forward for the following three years, and kicked 337 goals in 61 games. The presence of Vallence at full-forward and Todd at centre half-forward in the same Williamstown team was a huge drawcard for the club in 1940 and 1941. Vallence played for Brighton after the war.
- Ted Freyer (Essendon to Port Melbourne in 1938) – a forward pocket originally from Port Melbourne, Freyer had played 124 games and kicked 372 goals for Essendon. He returned to Port Melbourne without a clearance, and was the first player to formally receive his VFA permit without a VFL clearance (Nash had been the first player to announce his move, but Freyer was the first to have it formalised). He was Port Melbourne's dominant forward for the next four years, kicking 484 goals in 84 games, and twice winning the VFA goalkicking.
- Tommy Lahiff (Essendon to Port Melbourne in 1938) – Lahiff had played for Port Melbourne from 1930 to 1934, then played for Essendon for three years. He was appointed Port Melbourne playing coach in 1938, and was granted a clearance after indicating he would cross whether the clearance was granted or not.
- Jack Titus (Richmond to Coburg in 1945) – Titus kicked 970 goals over eighteen seasons as a small forward at Richmond. At age 37, he was cleared to Coburg, where he played two seasons and kicked 119 goals.
- Terry Brain (South Melbourne to Camberwell in 1938) – a ten-year rover for South Melbourne during its successful period in the 1930s, Brain had initially retired at the end of 1937, but then decided to play for Camberwell in 1938. Brain was cleared by South Melbourne.
- Geoff Mahon (Geelong to Prahran in 1941) – a ruckman who had played 69 games in five seasons for Geelong, Mahon crossed to Prahran without a clearance in 1941.
- Marcus Boyall (Collingwood to Camberwell) – a star centre half back for eleven interrupted years at Collingwood and SANFL's Glenelg, where he had won a Magarey Medal, Boyall transferred from Collingwood to Camberwell without a clearance on £200 and £8 per week in 1946 and 1947.
- Herbie Matthews (South Melbourne to Oakleigh in 1946) – a follower who had played fourteen seasons with South Melbourne and tied with Des Fothergill for the 1940 Brownlow Medal. Matthews was cleared to Oakleigh as playing coach at age 32 in 1946 and served there for two seasons.
- Gordon Ogden (Melbourne to Williamstown in 1939) – a ten-year back pocket for Melbourne who had spent 1938 in the country, Ogden was cleared to Williamstown as captain-coach in 1939 and served in the position until 1941.
- Bill Faul (South Melbourne to Prahran in 1939) – seven-year half-backman who had finished second in the 1932 Brownlow Medal, Faul crossed to Prahran as captain-coach without a clearance in 1939 for £5/wk. He went on to coach a then-record 313 senior VFA games with Prahran, Northcote and Moorabbin both during and after the throw-pass era.
- Austin Robertson, Sr. (South Melbourne/Perth to Port Melbourne in 1940) – a thirteen-year senior key position player for South Melbourne, West Perth and Perth, Robertson had been located in Western Australia with his employer since 1937. Upon his return to Victoria, it was expected that he would return to South Melbourne, to which he was still bound; but instead he signed with Port Melbourne for a reported £6 per week, and crossed without a clearance from South Melbourne.
- Alby Morrison (Footscray to Preston in 1939) – an eleven-year half-forward, third in the 1938 Brownlow Medal and, at the time, Footscray's leading VFL career goalkicker with 345 goals, Morrison went to Preston as playing coach with a clearance in 1939 for £140. Morrison served there for two years before returning to Footscray in 1941.
- Allan Everett (Geelong to Preston in 1941) – Geelong's captain in 1940, Everett crossed to Preston in 1941 without a clearance.
- Albert Collier (Collingwood to Camberwell in 1945) – the 1929 Brownlow Medallist and 1931 Leitch Medallist and six-time VFL premiership player with Collingwood, Collier was cleared to Camberwell as captain-coach at age 35 upon the VFA's post-war resumption in 1945. He led the club for two years, and took it to its most successful season in 1946 with a minor premiership and grand final appearance.
- Harry Collier (Essendon seconds to Camberwell in 1947) – brother of Albert, retrospective winner of the 1930 Brownlow Medal and also a six-time premiership player with Collingwood, Collier joined Camberwell as captain-coach at age 40 in mid-1947, spending only the remainder of that season with the club.
- Jim Bohan (Hawthorn to Camberwell in 1947) – after nine years at Hawthorn, where he represented Victoria and served as club captain for two years including in 1946, Bohan crossed to Camberwell without a clearance in 1947 and played there for seven years.
- Jack Blackman (Hawthorn to Preston in 1947) – a centre half-back and Hawthorn's vice-captain in 1946, Blackman crossed to Preston as captain-coach without a clearance in 1947, and went on to win the J. J. Liston Trophy in 1949.

Nash, Pratt, Todd, Fothergill, Vallence, Titus, Matthews, both Collier brothers, and Roy Cazaly (who played a few games for Camberwell at age 48 while he was there as coach in 1941) are all inductees in the Australian Football Hall of Fame, with Pratt and Cazaly recognised in the Legend category. Only in Todd's case is his VFA career acknowledged in his citation.

== Effect of World War II ==
Although World War II began in September 1939, its impact on football was not substantially felt until 1942, when most suburban and country leagues went into recess. The VFL and VFA both intended to continue operating into the 1942 season; but on 20 April, only a couple of weeks out from the opening round, the VFA decided to cancel the season, citing the unavailability of grounds (many were being used to support the war effort), the lack of players due to enlistments, and the lack of committeemen due to the increased workload required to support the war effort. The 1943 and 1944 seasons were also cancelled, resulting in a three-year hiatus from competition. The VFA's committee continued to operate in an administrative capacity during this time. The VFL continued to stage its premiership uninterrupted throughout the war, with the only exception being that Geelong was unable to compete in 1942 and 1943 due to travel restrictions. All of the smaller competitions which had adopted the VFA's rules were also in recess, so League rules was now the only form of Australian rules football being played in Australia, putting an abrupt halt to the growth of the VFA code after only four years.

With the VFA in recess, many VFA players sought to play in the VFL. Although there was still no long-term reciprocal clearance agreement between the bodies, the VFA and VFL agreed to a system of temporary clearances to last during the war, whereby any players cleared by the VFA to the VFL would be required to return to VFA when it reformed; the VFA granted around 200 temporary clearances under this agreement. However, players who had been disqualified from the VFL for crossing to the VFA without a clearance before the war remained ineligible to cross back to the VFL during the war; Todd, Fothergill and Wilson all made appeals to have their VFL disqualifications overturned in 1943, but their appeals were dismissed. Austerity Coulter Law payments capped at £1 per match were reintroduced during the three wartime years.

== Resumption after the war ==
The VFA resumed competition under the throw-pass rules in 1945. In accordance with their wartime agreement, VFL permits for VFA players were revoked; however, as there was no other reciprocal clearance agreement between the bodies, there was nothing to prevent the VFL from immediately issuing new permits to those same players if they wished to remain in the VFL and were willing incur a suspension from the VFA. Both the VFA and the VFL increased their suspensions for players who switched competition without a clearance from three years to five years.

Additionally, the VFA lost many of the star pre-war recruits it had secured without clearances back to the VFL. Under the terms of their suspensions from the VFL, the players were required to stand out of all football, not just VFL football, for three years before their VFL suspensions could be lifted. Had there been no war interruption, it is unlikely that any suspended players would ever have met this qualification; but with the VFA in recess for three years, all such players were now eligible to return to the VFL. One stumbling block to this was the VFL's treatment of games arranged within the armed services during the war: in 1943, the VFL had ruled that such games were considered competitive, and therefore a player who had played in a services game was deemed not to have stood out of football during the war; but this ruling was overturned in March 1945, which on the eve of the season made around forty players who had played only in services matches suddenly eligible to return to their original VFL clubs. After the war-time hiatus, the VFA clubs had less money to offer star players, and so many opted to take the opportunity to return to the VFL. Of the VFA's four superstar recruits, Nash, Fothergill and Pratt all returned to the VFL; Todd remained in the VFA for the rest of the throw-pass era.

Other competitions which had played under the VFA rules before the war also resumed playing in 1945 or 1946, but some reverted to League rules, including the North Western Football Association, which had been the code's second-most prominent competition and its main foothold in Tasmania, and Victoria's public schools, a key development competition. This left the VFA with significantly reduced market penetration for its rules. The King Island Football Association, the small and remote league on the Bass Strait island of King Island, adopted the Association rules in 1946, but otherwise growth of the VFA code after the war was minimal.

== Final years of throw-pass football ==
Between 1945 and 1949, the VFA continued to operate under throw-pass rules. Two notable rule changes were made in 1947: a free kick was introduced for "kicking in danger" – that is, kicking recklessly at the ball where there is a strong risk of kicking an opposing player in the process, even if no contact is made with the opposing player – and shepherding was banned in ruck contests. The VFA continued to court country leagues in an attempt to spread its code, and to that end staged exhibition matches in country Victoria and small interstate markets from 1945 until 1947, which included games in Broken Hill, Launceston, Bendigo, Hamilton, Echuca, Bairnsdale and Mooroopna. Games were not always supported by proponents of the ANFC code; the Tasmanian Australian National Football League, for example, petitioned the North Tasmanian Cricket Association not to stage its 1946 match between Williamstown and Coburg, fearing popularity could be gained by the rival code.

VFA throw-pass grand final results

1938 – Brunswick 19.17 (131) d. Brighton 14.14 (98)
1939 – Williamstown 14.20 (104) d. Brunswick 14.11 (95)
1940 – Port Melbourne 23.22 (160) d. Prahran 17.11 (113)
1941 – Port Melbourne 15.18 (108) d. Coburg 11.23 (89)
1942 – not contested
1943 – not contested
1944 – not contested
1945 – Williamstown 16.21 (117) d. Port Melbourne 10.20 (80)
1946 – Sandringham 14.15 (99) d. Camberwell 13.14 (92)
1947 – Port Melbourne 15.15 (105) d. Sandringham 11.8 (74)
1948 – Brighton 13.16 (94) d. Williamstown 13.7 (85)
1949 – Williamstown 10.5 (65) d. Oakleigh 8.14 (62)

Even though the Association code did not grow further, the VFA continued to enjoy local success. The VFA continued to draw some of the best crowds in its existence during the first few years after the war. A record home-and-away crowd of 21,000 was drawn to a June 1945 match between ladder-leaders Coburg and Williamstown. The average crowd in 1947 was 4,200, almost double the crowds from ten years earlier. Not all of this increase was attributed to the throw-pass rules: part is attributed to petrol rationing, which began during the war and continued until 1950, as it reduced the mobility of Melburnians, making it more difficult for suburban dwellers to attend VFL games or pursue other Saturday afternoon leisure activities. The average crowds were, however, highly dependent on the clubs: big clubs in important matches could attract more than 10,000 spectators; small clubs in dead rubbers might struggle to attract more than a few hundred. Organisationally, by the end of the 1940s the Association employed a full-time secretary and managed a players provident fund, none of which existed prior to the throw-pass era.

The VFA's player recruitment and transfer strategies shifted dramatically during this period. The flow of star VFL players crossing to the VFA on high wages mostly ceased: even though the Coulter Laws were still in effect, the VFL had by this time established a provident fund for players, and illegal payments from wealthy VFL club benefactors were becoming commonplace, reducing the financial incentives for stars to defect. Over 1945 and 1946, most players who transferred from the VFL were ageing players who were not major drawcards, and to whom their VFL clubs were happy to grant clearances. At the same time, after several years of the richer clubs recruiting stars to help them to the VFA premiership, Len Toyne led his historically unsuccessful Sandringham club to the 1946 premiership on the back of a speedy team of mostly under-23s recruited from Sandringham's growing local population. As clubs sought to emulate Toyne's success and the VFA sought to encourage development of the districts, a rule was introduced in 1948 to prevent VFA clubs from recruiting VFL players older than 27 years, except for a coaching position. However, by this time, the flow of talented young players departing the VFA for the VFL had returned to where it was prior to 1938, when the VFA had originally broken from the VFL.

By 1949, the spectacle of throw pass football was declining. Sportswriters commented that positional play had reduced and more players were now following the ball, resulting in crowded play and less speedy open play, which was countering the original intent of the throw pass. VFA crowds were beginning to wane, having dropped from 4,200 in 1947 to 3,380 in 1949, and the VFA's rules were gaining no further penetration into minor markets, nor support from the ANFC leagues. Some VFA club delegates felt that the throw-pass had outlived its novelty, and was no longer serving as an effective drawcard for the VFA.

The 1949 grand final on Saturday 1 October was the final senior VFA game played under throw-pass rules: Williamstown 10.5 (65) defeated Oakleigh 8.14 (62) at the St Kilda Cricket Ground before a crowd of 40,000.

== Football control ==
=== Control structure during the schism ===
Having created a new code of football which was being adopted by other bodies, the VFA took on the role as the governing body and administrator for the throw-pass code. Leagues which adopted the rules split from their traditional governing bodies and entered affiliations with the VFA, paying an affiliation fee for the privilege. The NWFA, for example, ended its affiliation with the North Western Football Union in 1938 to enter an affiliation with the VFA; and competitions in country Victoria were forced to leave their governing body, the Victorian Country Football League, to affiliate directly with the VFA. In September 1946, the VFA was registered as an incorporated company, and it obtained a copyright of its code of rules.

Throughout the schism, the VFL and VFA maintained a working relationship and collaborated on areas of mutual interest. For example, since 1934 the VFL and VFA had jointly sponsored and managed the Victorian Football Union, which was the administrative body for junior and suburban football leagues within metropolitan Melbourne, including managing permit and clearance arrangements; and the two bodies continued that arrangement despite the schism.

With the VFA and VFL refusing to recognise each other's permits, playing under different codes of rules, actively promoting their own codes, and operating under different player payment structures, Australian rules football was enduring a schism analogous to the divide which existed for a century, and from an on-field perspective still exists, between the league and union codes of Rugby football.

=== Desire for united control ===
Even before the 1938 season began, the VFL, VFA and ANFC all recognised that operating under divided control and under substantially different codes of rules was not in the interests of Australian rules football as a whole. The lack of a united front made it difficult to effectively promote the game in New South Wales and Queensland – where rugby was more popular – or to defend Victoria from other football codes, particularly as the trafficking of players from one body by the other was undermining public opinion. It was also recognised that unifying control by allowing the VFL to use its size and influence to push the VFA out of the market altogether was not in the interests of football, as the VFA served the functions of promoting football in Melbourne's outer suburbs, and in occupying those suburbs' best quality grounds to keep other sports from using them; this became more important in the years immediately after WWII, when Australia's "populate or perish" immigration policy resulted in rapid urban spread, population growth in the previously small VFA areas, and that population growth including many European immigrants with pre-existing support for soccer and rugby. Even though it would almost certainly force it to give up the throw-pass which had driven its new popularity, the VFA was willing to negotiate towards a solution for unified control.

=== Proposals for united control ===
From the moment the VFA announced its intention to adopt the throw pass and break the 1934 agreement, the VFA and VFL were working reunification discussions, and negotiations were ongoing throughout the schism – including during the World War II years when the VFA executive committee remained active in negotiation despite the competition being in recess onfield.

The VFA's desired outcome throughout the schism was for the amalgamation of the VFL and VFA into a single competition, with the VFA prepared to "sink its identity" into the VFL if its clubs were given the opportunity to contest the Victorian senior premiership. However, the two bodies never agreed to terms, with a number of sticking points preventing a compromise:

- Competition structure: the VFA wanted the establishment of two tiered divisions, with VFA to commence as a second division, and with promotion and relegation between them, such that the second division's top two clubs replaced the first division's bottom two clubs, but the VFL rejected the scheme; a 1940 scheme proposed likewise, with only one team promoted and relegated each year, but also proposing a further third division incorporating teams from other sub-district competitions. In 1944, the VFL offered a similar scheme in which the second division's top two clubs played off for promotion against the first division's bottom two clubs, but ultimately no complete solution was ever agreed to.
- Zoning: a significant impediment to combining the competitions was that VFL clubs had recruited players under a zoning/district scheme since 1915, whereas VFA clubs did not. The VFA clubs wanted to have the same recruiting and development control over their own geographical districts, something which would require re-alignment of zones to be agreed to by the VFL clubs; the VFL's zoning committee saw this as unachievable, particularly in places where VFA and VFL clubs were neighbouring, because VFL clubs had always been very protective of their zones; and this was complicated further by the VFL's decision to expand its zones into VFA territory in 1940. In 1945, the VFL proposed an amalgamation in which the VFA would serve as the second eighteens competition for the VFL, which would have been workable within the existing zoning system; but the VFA was not willing to take on an amalgamation in which its clubs were not granted senior status.
- Grounds standard: most VFA grounds were well short of VFL standard, and unless there were significant and expensive upgrades by all of the councils in VFA territory, this would be a serious impediment for any VFA club promoted to the top division.
- Financial considerations: the smaller VFA clubs had weaker financial means and lower fanbases than the VFL clubs. The VFA clubs wanted to be full financial members of the amalgamated VFL, while existing VFL clubs were concerned that an amalgamation would weaken their own financial position, reduce gate takings at matches played against a former VFA opponent, and spread more thinly the league's annual dividends – indeed, this had been a major motivation for the VFL's original secession from the VFA in 1897.
- Rules: the VFA was keen to incorporate as many of its own rules into an amalgamated competition, but the VFL was bound by its affiliation with the ANFC to play under the national rules.

Although at times the VFL and VFA executive committees made progress on negotiations, both bodies required constitutional changes to be ratified by a vote of their club delegates; even if the committees had agreed to an amalgamation, there is no guarantee that the clubs would have voted in favour.

As an alternative to amalgamation, it was thought that a new single control council could be established to manage football in Victoria, which would answerable to the ANFC and which would comprise delegates from the VFL and VFA as well as schools and junior competitions. Another proposal, more aggressively raised by the VFL in 1940, saw a VFL zoning sub-committee investigate a scheme to admit four to six of the VFA's twelve clubs; this scheme was reminiscent of the VFL's 1925 expansion, which would have seen the VFL admit the VFA's strongest clubs, leaving only the VFA's weaker clubs playing under the throw-pass code, which would have halted the new code's growth and possibly killed off the VFA altogether. Nothing came of either scheme.

=== Control in Tasmania ===
Although the Association's rules were played only by very small leagues in Tasmania after the war, they were still important in off-field control discussions during the late 1940s. Tasmania was represented on the ANFC by Hobart's Tasmanian Australian National Football League; but Launceston's Northern Tasmanian Football Association and the coastal North Western Football Union, which were leagues of similar standard, were dissatisfied with football being controlled from Hobart, and they sought to establish a statewide council to provide them with equal representation in control of football in Tasmania. The fact that the NTFA and NWFU had a feasible option of switching their affiliation to the VFA, underpinned by the fact that the throw-pass code had enjoyed pre-war success in the NWFA, was used by the two greater northern leagues leverage when negotiating with the TANFL for united control in the late 1940s. The northern leagues were ultimately unsuccessful in establishing a council, and did not follow through with their threat; the TANFL continued to serve as Tasmania's sole voice on the ANFC, although its relationship with the NTFA and NWFU improved in the early 1950s.

=== Resolution ===
Efforts to reunite control stagnated for a few years after 1945. Since it was no longer recruiting star VFL players, the VFA's bargaining power to gain concessions in negotiations was weakened; and the losses of the VFA's two most enthusiastic pre-war administrators – secretary Russell Keon-Cohen, who had departed in 1943, and president J. J. Liston, who died in 1944 – also slowed progress.

Reunification efforts were reinvigorated in 1948 by the ANFC. The ANFC had a revived enthusiasm for spreading Australian rules football to other parts of Australia and the world, as it saw a strong opportunity at that time to promote the game in the United States of America. The ANFC and many of its delegates considered it very important that the VFL–VFA schism be ended and the control of football be unified to achieve these aims. ANFC president Walter Stooke called in 1948 upon the old adage that "a house divided against itself is easiest upset" when describing the importance of reunification.

By the end of the 1940s, the VFA's main remaining objective was to be represented in the control and administration of the game, and it had rejected solutions under which the VFL retained unilateral control in Victoria. Under the new proposals put forward in 1948, the ANFC offered to grant the VFA a position on the ANFC executive. This new solution would force the VFA to adopt the national rules and permit reciprocity agreements, but would give the VFA the powers of control it desired, and allow it to remain independent from the VFL.

The proposal was first put forward to the VFA in late 1948, and although it was initially rejected – largely because the VFA wanted a full voting position on the council, which was not offered – it began to herald the end of the schism. In March 1949, the VFA and VFL signed a new clearance reciprocity agreement, ending eleven seasons of player trafficking; and by the end of the season, both the VFA and VFL had agreed to lift any active suspensions which players had received for switching codes without a clearance. The ANFC and VFA continued to negotiate an affiliation agreement through the season, which included the ANFC offering the VFA a period of temporary trial affiliation to encourage it to join. Finally, on 8 August, the VFA agreed to affiliate with the ANFC, with the motion succeeding by a vote of 18–7 at the VFA Board of Management. Under the terms of the affiliation:

- The VFA received a seat on the council, which had full rights except that it could not vote on council matters. The Association delegate had full rights to raise motions and put forward its views relating to other motions – privileges which were not enjoyed by any other affiliated non-voting member of the ANFC.
- The VFA would need to abandon its own rules, including the throw-pass, and play under ANFC rules.
- The VFA would be beholden to the ANFC's reciprocal transfer agreements with interstate leagues.
- The VFA could send a representative team to play in interstate carnivals and other sanctioned interstate games, meaning that Victoria would be represented by separate VFL and VFA teams in these interstate competitions.
- The VFA would share the benefits of ANFC programs such as advertising, development programs, etc.
- As it had no vote, the VFA was not initially required to pay a levy to the ANFC.

The VFA began its affiliation and began playing under ANFC rules from the 1950 season, bringing an end to the schism. It began paying levies and contributing to ANFC funds from 1951. It still wanted a full voting position on the ANFC, but it could not initially be granted due to a stipulation in the ANFC constitution that no state could have more than one vote; it began agitating for the necessary change to the constitution, and was finally granted the vote in July 1953. This gave the VFA a formal say in the control and administration of Australian football at the national level, and made Victoria the only state represented by two delegates on the council.

== Aftermath ==
After taking on the national rules, support of the VFA declined steadily throughout the 1950s. Although the VFA had always been of a lower standard than the VFL, the throw-pass had given it a notable point of distinction which it could use to attract fans in spite of that; without that, the VFA was firmly viewed as Victoria's second-rate competition. At the same time, the end of petrol rationing in 1950 and increased affordability of motor cars during the 1950s freed up suburban dwellers for other activities, or to attend VFL matches, on Saturday afternoons, and the introduction of television to Australia in the late 1950s affected attendances at the social nights which were vital for VFA clubs' finances at the time. Within only a few years, weak clubs such as Northcote, Camberwell and Brighton struggled to the point of being unable to pay their players; even Williamstown, which had strong community links and won five premierships in six years between 1954 and 1959, saw its adult membership drop from 1562 to only 416 between 1950 and 1960. It was not until the 1960s, when the VFA expanded further into the growing outer suburbs and began playing games on Sundays that it began to re-establish itself as a competitive part of Melbourne's football culture.

In 1951, as crowds dropped, the VFA tried to reintroduce the throw-pass rule. It put a motion to the ANFC to either change the national rules to allow throwing the ball, or to allow it as a "domestic rule", i.e. a rule which was permitted within the national rules, but on which individual leagues had discretion. The motion was rejected by a 7–1 majority, with only Tasmania supporting it and the VFA not yet having the right to vote. Some VFA clubs wanted to break away from the ANFC to allow the throw-pass to be reintroduced, but this never gained majority support.

The VFA remained affiliated with the ANFC until March 1970. Its relationship with the ANFC began to strain in 1965, when the VFA stopped recognising its 1949 permit reciprocity agreement with the VFL. Clearance disputes, particularly related to transfer fees, between the VFA and VFL persisted over the next five years, before finally the VFA was expelled in 1970 for refusing to submit to an ANFC ultimatum to establish and recognise a new permit agreement. It did not re-introduce the throw-pass after its expulsion from the ANFC.

== See also ==
- Victorian Football League/Australian Football League
- Victorian Football Association
- Australian National Football Council
- History of Australian rules football
- The Schism, the equivalent control schism between rugby league and rugby union
