= Alfred Moffat =

Alfred Moffat may refer to:

- Alf Moffat (1870–1956), Australian sportsman
- Alfred Edward Moffat (1863–1950), Scottish musician
