= Tassie (surname) =

Tassie is a surname. Notable people with the surname include:

- Eric Tassie (1887–1936), Australian rules football administrator
- Henry Tassie (1863–1945), accountant and politician in South Australia
- James Tassie (1735–1799), Scottish gem engraver and modeller
- William Tassie (1777–1860), Scottish gem engraver and modeller, nephew of James
