= J. J. Liston =

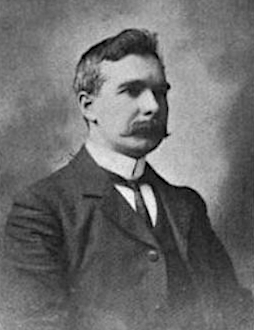

Mayor of Williamstown
- In office 1901–1902, 1913–1914, 1922–1927

Personal details
- Born: John James Liston; 21 September 1872 Granny, County Roscommon, Ireland
- Died: 12 April 1944 (aged 71) East Melbourne, Victoria, Australia
- Spouses: Eva Emily Roberts (m. 1910; died 1928) May Ward (m. 1930)
- Children: 2
- Occupation: Businessman, sporting administrator, politician

John James Liston (21 September 1872 – 12 April 1944) was an Australian businessman, civic leader, and sporting administrator. He served as Mayor of Williamstown and on the Melbourne City Council, and was also a long-serving president of the Victorian Football Association.

== Early life and business career ==
Liston was born in the townland of Granny, near Boyle, County Roscommon, Ireland, the son of Mary Ann (née McNamany) and John Haire Liston, a member of the Royal Irish Constabulary. John Liston was dismissed from the police in 1873, and the family moved to Australia in 1882, settling in Williamstown, Victoria. After leaving school, Liston trained as a barber and eventually started his own shop. He later became the licensee of a local hotel, and served as secretary of the Liquor Trades' Defence Union (LTDU), an organisation devoted to countering the temperance movement. Victoria held referendums on prohibition in 1930 and 1938; Liston and the LTDU played a key part in their defeat.

== Local government ==
Liston was elected to the Williamstown City Council in 1898, and became mayor for the first time in 1901 (reputedly the youngest in the state). He was re-elected to another six mayoral terms over the following three decades, serving from 1901 to 1902, 1913 to 1914, and 1922 to 1927. Liston represented the city on the Melbourne Harbor Trust, and oversaw the construction of the Williamstown Town Hall (opened 1927). He eventually resigned from the council in 1930, due to allegations of misconduct. In 1923, Liston had also been elected to the Melbourne City Council, where he was chairman of the traffic and building regulations committee for six years. He ran for Lord Mayor of Melbourne in 1931, but lost to Harold Gengoult Smith by a single vote.

== Sports ==
Liston was a longtime member of the Williamstown Football Club, and was the club president from 1923 to 1933. He was also a trustee of the Melbourne Cricket Ground and a prominent racehorse owner, serving as president of the Williamstown Racing Club from 1939 to 1944. The Liston Stakes were named in his honour.

In 1929, Liston was elected president of the Victorian Football Association (VFA), in succession to John Aikman. He was already a VFA life member at the time of his election. Liston supported amalgamation with the larger and wealthier Victorian Football League (VFL), and when that did not eventuate controversially suggested that the VFA might merge with soccer or rugby. In 1935, he was also elected president of the Victorian Soccer Association. A VFA meeting passed a resolution "congratulating him on his broad-mindedness", although the Northcote Football Club's delegate attempted to move a censure motion.

After Liston's death in East Melbourne on 12 April 1944, Hector de Lacy of The Sporting Globe wrote: "In the death of J. J. Liston football has lost a leader. He loved a thrilling sporting bout and football held the highest place in his affections. He took a leading part in the politics of the Australian game. I can vouch for his sincere desire to do the greatest good for the game itself, irrespective of pre-established ideas and constitutions. He was prepared to kick his way through any conservatism that the greater good of the game could be served." In 1945, the J. J. Liston Trophy was established in his honour, to be awarded to the league's best player at the each of season.

== Personal life ==
Liston married Eva Emily Roberts in 1910, with whom he had two sons. He was widowed in 1928, but remarried in 1930 to May Ward.

== See also ==
- Australian rules football schism (1938–1949)
