= William Thomas Martin =

William Thomas Martin (born 1883) was a South Australian educator who specialised in primary school teaching methods.

== History ==
Martin was born in Brentwood, on Yorke Peninsula, South Australia, son of Henry William Martin and Eliza Martin née Giles, who married in 1876. He was educated at the local school, where in 1898 he served as school monitor, and moved to Adelaide for continued education at the Flinders Street school, first as a student and then as a pupil teacher. In 1904 he started on a Teachers' College scholarship to study at the University of Adelaide but interrupted it after two years when he was appointed head teacher at Moonta High School. Six years later he was transferred to Adelaide High School and a year later was appointed chief assistant at Thebarton High School. Meantime he completed his university studies and graduated BA in 1914. He served as Principal of both primary and high school at Victor Harbor for two years, then in 1920 was appointed School Inspector for the northern region, based in Quorn, followed by the Yorke Peninsula district in 1924.

In 1927, while on an extended overseas holiday, visited many teaching centres to gain an appreciation of teaching methods in other countries. On his return he took up duties as school inspector at Kadina.

In 1930 he was made Acting Superintendent of Primary Education, and five months later succeeded C. Charlton (died 1961) in the position, responsible for State primary schools in South Australia and the Northern Territory. In 1933 he was instrumental in revising the skill marking system, where anomalies occasionally gave promotion to less experienced teachers.

In 1947 he was awarded an OBE for services to education.

== Other interests ==
Martin was an enthusiastic musician, and at various stages of his teaching career conducted local choirs, choral societies and orchestras.

He was also a bowls player of considerable ability.

In the newspaper obituary for football administrator Frank Marlow, Martin (who deputised for William Adey) is credited as also vice-president of the Public Schools Football Association.
