= Universal football =

Proposed football code in Australia

- Highest governing body: Australian National Football Council and New South Wales Rugby League
- First proposed: 1908

Characteristics
- Contact: Full contact
- Team members: 14–15 per side
- Type: Field
- Equipment: Football

Presence
- Country or region: Australia, New Zealand
- Obsolete: Yes

Universal football was the name given to a proposed hybrid sport of Australian rules football and rugby league, proposed at different times between 1908 and 1933 as a potential national football code to be played throughout Australia and New Zealand. The game was trialled, but was never otherwise played in any regular competition.

== Background ==
By the early 20th century, Australian rules football, which had originated in Victoria in 1858, had been established as the dominant football code in Victoria, Tasmania, South Australia and Western Australia, holding that position since the 1870s or 1880s. Rugby union, which originated in the English Rugby School, had been the dominant code in New South Wales throughout the same time, until supplanted by rugby league in 1908. In Queensland, Australian rules was originally dominant, up until the 1880s, after which rugby union (and then rugby league) became the leading code.

One of the earliest mentions of a hybrid code was in 1874 when Brisbane's Victorian Association (Australian Rules) clubs and the two Brisbane rugby clubs Rangers and Bonnet Rouge experimented with mixed rules to compete against each other, but was ultimately deemed a failure, with clubs instead opting to co-operate until the growing rift caused the Northern Rugby Union to break away from the Queensland Football Association and ultimately become more popular.

In 1884 H. C. A. Harrison, known then as the "father of Australian Football", visited London where he proposed unifying Australian rules with Rugby under a set of hybrid rules and suggested that rugby clubs adopt some of the Victorian Rules. Football officials were insulted at the suggestion that they "abandon their rules to oblige an Antipodean game".

The preeminence of the traditional rugby union code was usurped by the newer and professional rugby league code with its introduction from northern England to Australia in 1907.

The idea of combining the two sports to create a "universal football" code to be played throughout Australia, and potentially around the world, arose at around the same time as rugby league began in Australia.

== 1908 conference ==
The first conference addressing the matter was held in 1908 between the New South Wales Rugby League (NSWRL), led by the league's founding administrator J. J. Giltinan, and Australian rules football officials, led by Australasian Football Council (AFC) president Con Hickey, with the view towards developing a hybrid set of rules which could be proposed to England's Northern Rugby Football Union (the administrative body for rugby league based in England) on the upcoming 1908–09 Kangaroo tour of Great Britain – rugby league as a code distinct from rugby union was a small and new code at the time, prominent only in northern England since 1895 and in Australasia for only a few years, so major rule changes which could be adopted worldwide were still a possibility, but there was no action resolved from this initial conference.. With the AFC's preference for the Australian code to be played only in Australia, Hickey believed in promoting Universal Football to nations outside Australia in preference to Australian Football particularly North America, England, the United States and had particularly strong support from the AFC's New Zealand and New South Wales delegates who faced increasing competition from the rugby codes.

== 1914–15 proposal ==
The furthest progressed attempt to develop a universal football code took place in 1914–15. Following two major football events in Sydney during mid-1914 – the Great Britain Lions rugby league tour and the 1914 Australian rules football interstate carnival – the motivation of the NSWRL and AFC to unify the Australian football codes was heightened. Many administrators from both sports supported an amalgamation. Sportswriters noted that there was a mutual financial benefit to the AFC and the NSWRL, which was considered to be the chief motivation for progressing towards amalgamation: the NSWRL had only one meaningful interstate rival (Queensland), and its tours to England generally lost money, so having more interstate rivals would generate additional interest and gate takings; the AFC also had the opportunity to gain additional interstate and international rivals; the AFC would gain the benefit of the strong financial position of the NSWRL; and amalgamation would put an end to the outflow of money which each body had expended attempting unsuccessfully to promote its code in the other's territory. Sportswriters were divided on whether or not English administrators would support adopting the changes globally, with the main argument in favour being that English sides had made strong profits when touring Australasia and that they may seek to preserve that capability. Many sportswriters, among them respected Australian rules football sportswriters Jack Worrall and Reginald Wilmot, criticised the administrative bodies for putting their financial considerations ahead of the quality of the respective games, and predicted that fans across Australia would react negatively to changes to their favoured codes.

=== Proposed rules ===
A conference was held in November 1914 and a preliminary code of rules was drawn up. Key features of the proposed rules were as follows:

- The game would be played on a rectangular field 160 yards long and 100 yards wide, similar in size to an Australian rules football field, and the same shape as but much larger than a rugby league field. There would be a distance of 140 yards between the goal lines, with a 10 yard in-goal area at each end.
- The game would be played fifteen players per side – compared with thirteen per side in rugby league and eighteen per side in Australian rules football.
- There would be a set of rugby-style goal posts on each goal line, with two uprights 18 feet apart and a crossbar 10 feet high. A goal would have to pass between the uprights and over the crossbar to count.
- The game would be played with an oval shaped ball, which was common to both sports.
- The methods of scoring, which combined scoring methods from both parent codes, would be:
  - Grounding the ball in team's attacking in-goal area for a try – three points plus an attempt at a conversion.
  - Goal scored from general play – two points.
  - Goal from a mark or free kick, or a conversion – one point.
  - Grounding the ball in the team's defensive in-goal area for a "touch-down" or "force" – one point conceded.
- The rugby league scrum would be abolished, and play would be restarted by Australian rules football means: a ball-up, by which the umpire bounces the ball into the air, within the field of play or a boundary throw-in by the umpire from outside the touch line.
- A deliberate kick for goal or conversion would be taken by the player who marked the ball or scored the try as in Australian rules, rather than by a designated goalkicker as in rugby league.
- Throwing the ball as in rugby league would be permitted.
- Forward passes and knock-ons would not be permitted, as in rugby league.
- Tackling between the hips and shoulders would be permitted, as in rugby league.^{Note 1}

The most significant sticking point to developing the hybrid code, and indeed the most significant difference between rugby and Australian rules gameplay, was offside – a concept fundamental to rugby league and fundamentally absent from Australian rules football. The conference did not settle on a definitive hybrid solution for the offside issue, but early proposals were for the offside rule to be in effect in the forward quarters of the field, but not in effect elsewhere on the field.

=== Proposed amalgamation ===
The progress at the conference was strong and amalgamation between the two sports looked likely. The conference concluded that some changes would be made to both codes in 1915 to bring them closer together, with a view to also playing exhibition matches of a fully hybridised code in 1915 with the potential for complete hybridisation as early as 1916. Some observers thought that a gradual hybridisation under which annual rule changes which brought the codes progressively closer together over five to ten years until the two codes were uniform might be a more realistic approach.

The initial set of changes slated in November 1914 for the 1915 season were: Australian rules football would add the crossbar to its goalposts over which goals were to be kicked, would disallow forward handpasses or knock-ons, and adopt the stronger tackling rules; and rugby league would replace the scrum with the ball-up and throw-in, and require the try-scorer to take his own conversion kicks. The NSWRL approved these changes to its rules immediately, conditional on the AFC also approving, but administrative procedures within the AFC meant that each of the Australian rules football state leagues needed to hold its own vote on the matter before the majority position of the AFC delegates would be known. The time required to stage these state votes, and then convene another meeting of AFC delegates to formalise a combined vote (in an era when interstate travel was by rail or ship) meant that any changes to the rules would be delayed from being put into practice until at least 1916.

Over the early months of 1915, the issue was discussed at state league general meetings, with the South Australian Football League approving in January, the New South Wales Football League approving in February, West Australian Football League rejecting the changes in March, and the Victorian Football League approving in April. At the same time, fighting in World War I was escalating, and football was increasingly becoming secondary to the war effort. The Tasmanian Football League, when discussing the rule changes in March 1915, decided against providing any decision on the matter due to the war, and the positions of the Queensland Football League and the Goldfields Football League were not reported. The Queensland Rugby League was not involved in the amalgamation discussions at all, having been neither consulted nor notified by the NSWRL.

The war effort ultimately precluded any further meetings of AFC delegates. As such, even though gaining the requisite three-quarters majority support for the new rules appeared at worst to be an even chance, the AFC never had the opportunity to put the rule changes to a formal vote of delegates, and therefore could not approve them; the NSWRL's conditional approval of changes to its rules lapsed, and any efforts towards amalgamation were put on hold indefinitely. In its first post-war meeting in December 1919, the AFC discussed whether or not to revive the issue of amalgamation, but owing to improved popularity of rugby league in New South Wales, Queensland and England since the war, decided that it would not consider amalgamation any further unless approached again on the issue by the NSWRL. This never happened, and the two sports progressed on separate paths thereafter. The proposed amalgamation, however, was to contribute directly to the demise of Australian rules football in New Zealand with the perception of Rugby League taking over the sport of Australian rules.

== 1933 revisit ==
The concept was revisited briefly in 1933, in large part through the enthusiasm of long-serving secretaries Harold R. Miller (of the NSWRL) and Con Hickey (of the renamed Australian National Football Council), both of whom had been involved in 1914. A code of rules mostly unchanged from 1914 was prepared. Key differences or clarifications were: the game was to be played 14-a-side; the off-side rules of rugby were resolved formally to apply within 35 yards of the goals but not elsewhere on the field; knocking-on was permitted from a ball-up but not in general play; and scoring was adjusted such that a try was worth three points and all goals worth two, consistent with rugby league scoring at the time.

A private trial match with only NSWRL and AFC officials present was held on 11 August 1933 at the Sydney Showground, during the Australian rules football interstate carnival which was being held in Sydney at the time. The game was played at reduced 12-a-side numbers by members of the visiting Queensland Australian rules football team some New South Wales rugby league players. The pace of the game was noted as being very fast, and that some of the play was quite spectacular, but the players' unfamiliarity with the rules meant the trial did not give a truly fair assessment of the potential of the game.

Shortly following the trial, delegates from the NSWRL – many of whom had been opposed to the trial in the first place – formally voted that it would not proceed any further with universal football. The concept has never since been revisited. The regional division between the preeminence of rugby league in the north and east Australia and Australian rules football in the rest of the country, sometimes characterised in the context of the Barassi Line, persists to the modern day.

== Footnotes ==
1. Tackling was not a common feature of Australian rules football at the time, although it was permissible. Under the holding the ball–holding the man rules in place at that time, if a player in possession of the ball was "caught" – which could mean tackled, held or sometimes even just touched by an opponent – he had to drop the ball immediately or a free kick would be paid for holding the ball; if the opponent continued to hold the player for any length of time after the ball was legally dropped, however, a free kick for holding the man would be paid. In practice, holding the man free kicks were applied so stringently that any attempt to make a rugby-style tackle would end in a holding the man free kick after the ball was dropped, so tackling had virtually disappeared from the game. The proposal to allow rugby-style tackling allowed for a player to complete a fair tackle without being penalised.
