= Wally Stooke =

Australian rules footballer (1895–1962)

President of the Australian National Football Council
- In office 19 February 1946 – 21 July 1950
- Preceded by: Bob Rush
- Succeeded by: Tony Kenny

Personal details
- Born: Walter Stooke; 30 January 1895 Adelaide, South Australia
- Died: 6 November 1962 (aged 67) Floreat, Western Australia, Australia

Walter Stooke (30 January 1895 – 6 November 1962) was a player, coach, and administrator of Australian rules football. He was president of the Australian National Football Council (ANFC) from 1946 to 1950, as well as president of the Western Australian National Football League (WANFL) from 1932 to 1951.

Stooke was born in Adelaide, but came to Western Australia at a young age. He played two seasons for the Perth Football Club in 1915 and 1916, and then spent several years in the Australian Army before returning to league football in 1920, as Perth's captain. Stooke was also club captain in 1921, but suffered a career-ending knee injury. He was then appointed non-playing coach for the 1922 season.

Stooke served as Perth's treasurer in 1923, and then as its secretary from 1924 to 1929. In 1932, he was elected president of the WANFL in succession to Alf Moffat, who had resigned due to a dispute over player clearances. Stooke would serve as league president until 1951, and was also president of the Australian National Football Council from 1946 to 1950. Stooke died in 1962, aged 67. He was posthumously inducted into the West Australian Football Hall of Fame in 2005.

== See also ==
- Australian rules football schism (1938–1949), which ended during Stooke's ANFC presidency
