= Thomas Seymour Hill =

Australian rules football administrator (1893–1977)

Thomas Seymour Hill OBE (21 February 1893 – 1 August 1977), invariably referred to as T. S. Hill, was a leading Australian rules football administrator in the SANFL between 1926 and 1963.

== History ==
Hill was born at Beulah road, Norwood, close to Norwood Oval, and went to school in Marryatville. His first employment was ten years in the wheat trade with Dalgety & Co., followed by Norman & Co. As a youngster he attended Clayton Congregational Church, played football with the church team, and was involved in other church activities such as their Literary Society and Model Parliament. Around 1913 he organised a basketball team with E. Wadham, E. A. Johnson, and H. E. P. Whitfield that played in Melbourne. He accepted a position with the Federal Mutual Insurance Company when A. J. Richardson left for England with the Australian XI in 1926. Hill played for the East Torrens Cricket Club (Richardson's old team), and was their secretary 1924–1926.

Hill was secretary for Norwood from 1926 to 1935. In 1935 he succeeded Frank Marlow as secretary of the SANFL and continued in this post until 1963. He was secretary of the Australian National Football Council from 1938 until 1947.

== Recognition ==
He was made a Life Member of Norwood Football Club and the SANFL. He was inducted in the inaugural intake of the SANFL Hall of Fame in 2002 and selected to the Australian Football Hall of Fame in 1996.

The premiership trophy of the SANFL was named after him.
