= Hector de Lacy =

Australian rules football writer

Hector Alexander de Lacy (6 May 1900 – 1 November 1956) was a leading Melbourne-based Australian rules football writer, covering the Victorian Football League for over 20 years from the 1920s.

== Family ==
The son of Alexander George de Lacy (1872–1939), and Henrietta de Lacy (1875–1937), née Nicol, Hector Alexander de Lacy was born at Collingwood, Victoria on 6 May 1900.

He married Victoria Maud Lugton (1898–1979) in 1926. They had five children.

== Journalist ==
H. A. de Lacy was the chief football writer for The Sporting Globe newspaper in Melbourne and was noted for the controversial and bold nature of his writings. His opinionated and unabashed style made him one of the most widely read sports journalists of his time and he was banned by several clubs for periods of time because of his articles. He campaigned in the 1940s for better payments to players, arguing that 3 pounds per week was inadequate for the time spent training, travelling and injuries. He was an ardent supporter of the Victorian Football Association's throw-pass rules, which were in effect in that league during the 1940s.

Aside from both VFL and VFA football, de Lacy also wrote about rowing, tennis, and cricket.

== Death ==
He died at Sandringham, Victoria on 1 November 1956.

== Australian Football Hall of Fame ==
Hector de Lacy was posthumously inducted to the Australian Football Hall of Fame in 1996, with his citation reading:

Chief football writer on The Sporting Globe. Forthright and controversial, his style sometimes resulted in him being banned by clubs, but that did not deter him and he became one of the most widely read journalists from the 1940s.
