= Con Hickey =

Australian rules footballer and administrator

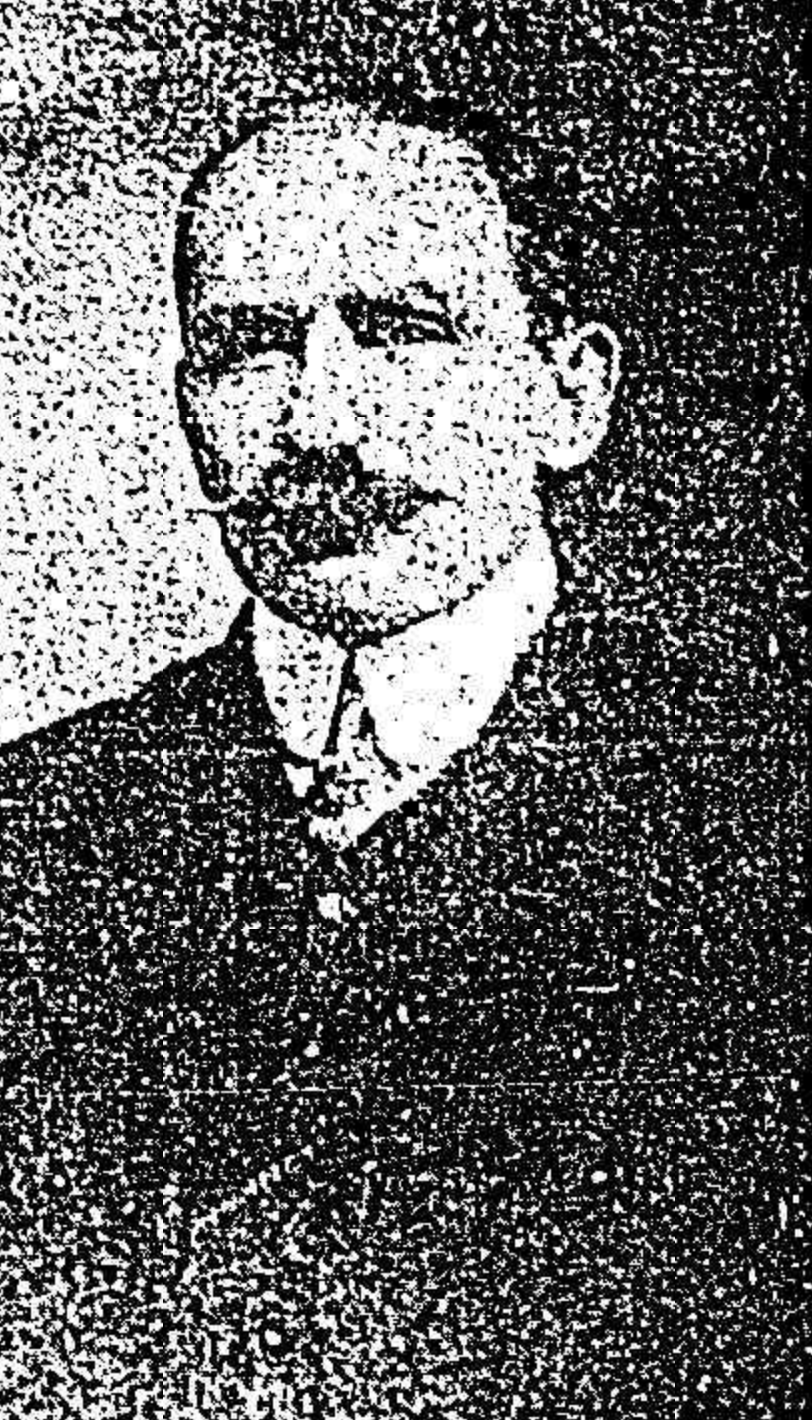
- Hickey in 1908

Personal information
- Full name: Cornelius Michael Hickey
- Born: 1866; Timor, Victoria
- Died: 27 October 1937 (aged 71); Clifton Hill, Victoria
- Original team: Maryborough
- Position: Half-back

Playing career^{1}
Years	Club	Games (Goals)
1887–1894	Fitzroy	109 (2)

Representative team honours^{2}
Years	Team	Games (Goals)
1893	Victoria	1
- ^{1} Playing statistics correct to the end of 1894.^{2} Representative statistics correct as of 1893.

Cornelius Michael "Con" Hickey (1866 – 27 October 1937) was an Australian rules football player and administrator for the Fitzroy Football Club, and administrator for the Victorian Football League (VFL) and the Australian National Football Council (ANFC).

He was a life member of both the VFL and the ANFC. As an administrator, Hickey was a fierce Australian nationalist and spared no expense in his attempt to nationalise the sport and grow the VFL's audience in New South Wales and Queensland, though continually struggled with the idea that people in these states did not appreciate the concept of "national football".

Hickey's importance to the development of the game as an administrator was widely regarded, and Perth's Sunday Times newspaper described him shortly before his death as "next in line of succession to the father and founder of the game, H. C. A. Harrison."

== Early life and football career ==
Born in Timor, Victoria in 1866, Hickey moved to Melbourne as a public servant in 1887. He played football as a half-back for the Fitzroy Football Club from 1887 until 1894, earning sufficient acclaim to gain selection for Victoria in intercolonial football in his final playing season, 1893. While in Timor, he had played a few years for Maryborough.

== Administrative career ==
He began his administrative career as secretary of the Fitzroy Football Club in 1893, also serving as club delegate to the Victorian Football Association board of management. He was secretary until 1910, and was a key part of the club's on- and off-field success during that time. In 1897, when Fitzroy and seven other clubs seceded from the VFA to form the Victorian Football League, Hickey served as the inaugural treasurer of the new body, and later as chairman of the permit and umpire committee and vice-president, and was a VFL administrator continuously until 1933.

=== Australasian Football Council ===
Hickey was a key figure in the formation and early administration of football's national administrative body, the Australasian Football Council (later the Australian National Football Council). He was the council's inaugural president from 1906 until 1909, and in 1910 he was elected secretary of the council, a position he held for the next 27 years until his death in 1937. In that capacity, he was heavily involved in the ANFC's efforts to promote football nationally, which included establishing the interstate carnival, scheduling numerous VFL exhibition matches in Sydney and Brisbane, and taking on a heavy administrative workload to arrange all carnivals which took place during his life. He was also involved in efforts to establish universal football – a hybrid between Australian rules football and rugby league which was proposed and trialled at different times between 1908 and 1933 in the hope of unifying Australia under a single football code.

Hickey had an insular approach to administration of the game in Australia and was critical of it expanding overseas. In 1906 he implemented a policy aimed at protecting the primacy of the VFL competition by excluding support for the game outside of Australia and in 1907, he declared that despite the game being played overseas the primary focus would be on inter-state competition and that he would not attempt to "oust rugby" in places where it was growing in popularity. There was also a clear conflict of interest in being head of Victoria's premier competition and the game's governing body which drew criticism for putting profit before promotion of the game. Hickey was involved in the VFL board discussions as to whether growing the game outside of Australia was in the interests of maintaining the VFL's premier status among the professional sports leagues. Early into his term as football chief he oversaw a diversion of promotional budgets for international game development domestically to New South Wales (and to a lesser extent Queensland) and moved to exclude fledgling nations including South Africa (1906), United States (1909), New Zealand (1910), Japan (1910) and Canada (1912) from membership in the council, choosing instead to promote to them the concept of universal football, which never took off. Overseas delegates were harshly critical of the alienating policies, in particular, his move to withdraw all senior funding from New Zealand in 1910 was regarded by the country's delegate as the "death warrant of the game over there".

Hickey saw football as a business venture, he was critical of international tours, and would not fund overseas travel unless it was highly profitable, as a result the AFC never allocated funds for it during his tenure. His position on international football appeared to change following World War I which had a significant impact on the code's supremacy in Australia. Having spent most of the game development budgets on what he believed to be a mildly successful attempt to establish the game in Sydney, in the late 1920s he began to note the rise of Gaelic football and entertained the idea of international matches and hybrid rules. However by this time most of the local leagues outside Australia had already gone into permanent recess and other football codes had become more firmly ingrained. Speaking in 1929 on the status of the code internationally, Hickey noted that the visiting All Blacks showed an appreciation of the marking and kicking in Australian rules, and pointed to Gaelic Football's rapid growth in the United States as an example of how Australian Football could one day still carve a niche overseas, though reiterated that the Council still had no plans to promote it outside of Australia.

== Outside football ==
Hickey worked in the public service from 1884 until 1931. He died after an illness lasting several months in Clifton Hill, Victoria in late 1937. Hickey's nephew Reg Hickey is a Hall of Fame player and coach who won a total of four premierships with the Geelong Football Club.
