= Eric Tassie =

Australian rules football administrator

President of the Australian National Football Council
- In office 4 November 1929 – 4 November 1935
- Preceded by: Alf Moffat
- Succeeded by: Bob Rush

Personal details
- Born: 12 October 1887 Adelaide, South Australia, Australia
- Died: 21 July 1936 (aged 48) Adelaide, South Australia, Australia

Eric Harry Tassie (12 October 1887 – 21 July 1936) was an Australian rules football administrator. He was president of the Australian National Football Council (ANFC) from 1929 to 1935.

Tassie was a son of Henry Tassie, who was a government minister in South Australia. He attended Way College, Adelaide, and played football for the school team and later for various lower-level clubs. An accountant by profession, Tassie became manager of the Norwood Football Club's B-grade team in 1912, and then in 1914 was elected club treasurer. He became club secretary in 1919, holding that position until 1924, and was a club delegate to the South Australian Football League (SAFL) (Note: The league was known as the South Australian National Football League (SANFL) after 1927.) from 1920 until his death. Tassie managed the South Australian state team at the 1924 National Carnival, and was a state selector on a number of other occasions.

After several years as a delegate from South Australia and a term as vice-president, Tassie was elected ANFC president at its general meeting in November 1929, succeeding Alf Moffat of Western Australia. He held the position until November 1935, when he resigned and nominated Bob Rush of Victoria as his successor. During his presidency, Tassie was known for his flexibility with regard to the laws of the game. He presided over the reintroduction of the flick pass for the 1934 season, and at one point suggested tackling should be banned in order to free up the flow of play. Tassie died unexpectedly in July 1936, aged 48, while undergoing an operation on his mastoid process. After his death, the Tassie Medal was struck in his honour, to be awarded to the best player at each Australian National Football Carnival.
