= Australian National Football Council =

Former sports governing body in Australia

Australian National Football Council ANFC
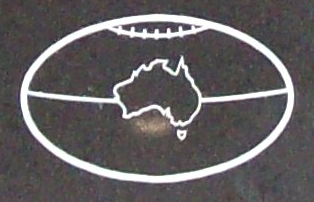
- Sport: Australian rules football
- Jurisdiction: Australia
- Motto: Populo ludus populi (The game of the people, for the people)
- Founded: 1906
- Dissolved: 1995
- Superseded by: Australian Football League Limited (AFL)
- Other names: Australasian Football Council; Australian Football Council; National Football League; National Australian Football Council
- (Australia)

The Australian National Football Council (ANFC) was the national governing body for Australian rules football in Australia from 1906 until 1995. The council was a body of delegates representing each of the principal leagues which controlled the sport in their respective regions. The council was the owner of the laws of the game and managed interstate administrative and football matters. Its function was superseded by the Australian Football League Limited (AFL).

The council underwent several name changes during its existence, and at different times it was also known as: the Australasian Football Council (1906–1919), the Australian Football Council (1920–1927 and 1973–1975), the National Football League (NFL) (1975–1989) and the National Australian Football Council (NAFC) (1989–1995).

== Structure and purpose ==
Throughout its history, the ANFC was the top level administrative body for the sport of Australian rules football. In this capacity, it served four main functions:

- It was the owner of the official laws of Australian rules football, with the intention that the sport be played under uniform rules across Australia. Any rule changes were discussed and approved within the council, and any changes were binding on all affiliated bodies nationally (although exceptions, known as "domestic rules" could be made with the permission of the council – amateur football, for example, was given special permission to use an order-off rule to control rough play).
- It established and supervised the processes of interstate player clearances and transfers. This included maintaining rules relating to residential qualifications for interstate clearances, intervening in disputes between the states, and ensuring that the clearance systems were enforced.
- It sought to develop and promote the game in markets where rugby football pre-dominated, including Sydney, country New South Wales, Queensland and the ACT. It did this by taking levies from the leagues where Australian rules football was dominant, and re-distributing those funds to the other markets for advertising and propaganda purposes, as well as arranging exhibition matches.
- It was responsible for the organisation of interstate matches, including the triennial Interstate Carnivals.

The structure of the council mirrored that of most football leagues in Australia at the time: each affiliated full member league appointed a delegate (or, in the early years, two delegates) to the council to act on its behalf in discussions and votes. The decision-making process followed by the council was that delegates would meet, generally every one to three years, to discuss and vote on proposed changes. All changes to on-field or off-field laws needed to be passed by a supermajority vote – this was originally a three-quarters majority, then later became a double majority which required an overall simple majority plus minimum number of the designated major states to vote in favour. The council also elected an executive committee which managed the game's administrative matters.

The affiliated full members of the council, which were the various state leagues such as the Victorian Football League and South Australian National Football League, became the controlling administrative bodies for football in their states. Smaller leagues within each state would affiliate with the controlling body, bringing all affiliated leagues in the country hierarchically under the influence of the ANFC.

The council maintained control by forbidding its affiliates from competing in matches against unaffiliated bodies without permission, and with the threat of excluding from the council any leagues, players or clubs who defied its rules. This meant that leagues could face exclusion if they played representative matches against un-affiliated leagues or their clubs without permission. It also meant that players who broke the ANFC's transfer rules by switching to an un-affiliated league without a clearance would be banned from affiliated leagues. Any penalties imposed by the council were inherently valid only within the council-affiliated competitions, and there was nothing to stop a league or player from ignoring council rules and carrying on in an unaffiliated system – and the Victorian Football Association spent much of its history operating in this manner – however, by virtue of the council's size, the number of options for unaffiliated leagues and players was sufficiently small to encourage most competitions to adhere to council rules and remain affiliated.

== History ==
=== 19th century ===
Australian rules football was first played in Melbourne, Victoria in 1858, and developed over the following decades. The game was spread to other cities, but due to the large distances between cities in Australia, the game developed independently in each city. Until the 1870s, football in each city or colony was administered in an ad hoc manner by the participating clubs, before colony-level administrative bodies began to be established, with the Victorian Football Association (VFA) and South Australian Football Association (SAFA) formed in 1877 and the Tasmanian Football Association (TFA) in 1879.

The first effort towards higher-level administration of the game took place in 1883, with an informal intercolonial football conference which took place on 9 November in Melbourne. With a growing desire to have a uniform set of rules across the country to facilitate intercolonial play and development of the sport, invitations were sent to all of the major football clubs or leagues. The meeting was attended by delegates representing Victoria, South Australia, Queensland and Tasmania; delegates from New South Wales also travelled to Melbourne but due to communication errors missed the conference; New Zealand was also invited to send a delegate. After debating rule differences which existed at that time between the colonies (including Tasmania's desire to have a crossbar on the goal posts, or South Australia's desire to have behinds count towards the final score of matches), a uniform set of rules was agreed to; the decisions were not binding, but were adhered to due to the collective desire of the delegates. Over the following decade, delegates from the different colonies or regions (Northern and Southern Tasmania, for example, were separately represented) met most Novembers to make adjustments to the playing and administrative rules of the game, coming to agreements based on a vote of attending delegates. Western Australia, where Australian rules football was not prominent until the mid-to-late 1880s, was not involved at this early stage.

In November 1892, the conference recommended the formation of a formal administrative body known as the Australasian Football Council which could make binding decisions. The council was ostensibly formed, and continued to put out rules. However, the legal status of this council came under question in 1894, when, while attempting to resolve a protest by South Melbourne over the eligibility of Essendon player Robert Byers, the VFA concluded that the council had not been legally and procedurally established; the VFA ceased to recognise the council, and returned to using the 1890 set of rules. After formal written communication from the VFA in 1895 that it did not recognise the existence of the council, national administration of the game returned to the informal process which had existed since 1883.

=== Formation of the Australasian Football Council ===
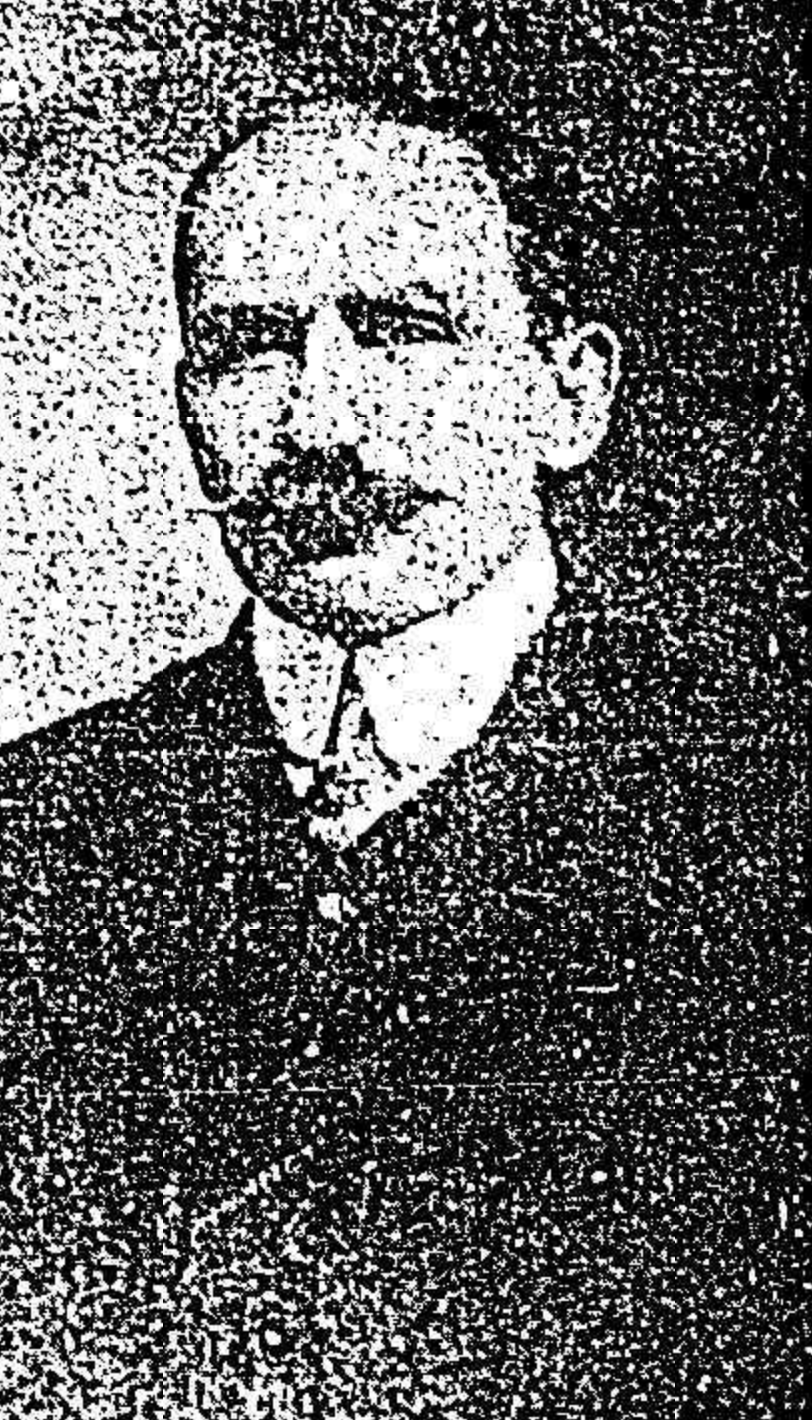
VFL administrator Con Hickey was inaugural president from 1906 until 1909, and continued to be the face of the council as secretary from 1910 until his death in 1937

The desire to re-establish a binding national governing body persisted, and after an agreement was reached at a conference of state delegates in November 1905, the Australasian Football Council was formally established during 1906, with its inaugural meeting taking place at the Port Phillip Hotel in Melbourne on 7 November 1906. The council's initial structure was that each state and New Zealand would have two delegates who would discuss and vote on matters. The decision to appoint two delegates was to allow states which had more than one main league to be represented separately by each, resulting in each being a controlling body for a different region of their state. Several states could have adopted this approach, but only Western Australia did. The delegates were:

- Victoria: two delegates from Melbourne's Victorian Football League (VFL). The VFA (which was now Melbourne's second-tier body, after the eight clubs which comprised the VFL had seceded from it in 1897) did not receive representation.
- South Australia: two delegates from Adelaide's SAFA (which was soon renamed the SAFL).
- Western Australia: one delegate from Perth's West Australian Football Association and one from Kalgoorlie-Boulder's Goldfields Football Association (which were soon renamed the WAFL and GFL respectively).
- Tasmania: two delegates from Hobart's Tasmanian Football League (previously known as the TFA). Launceston did not receive representation.
- New South Wales: two delegates from the New South Wales Australian Football League. Broken Hill's Barrier Ranges Football Association did not receive representation.
- Queensland: two delegates from Brisbane's Queensland Football League.
- New Zealand: two delegates from the dominion's overall administrative body. The North and South Islands did not receive separate representation.

Leagues not represented by delegates on the council would still come under the council's influence by affiliating under the umbrella of their state controlling body. Notably, the VFA remained unaffiliated, refusing to affiliate with the league which had seceded from it ten years earlier. Victoria's Con Hickey was made the inaugural president of the council. It was initially decided that clubs affiliated with the state controlling bodies would be charged a levy equal to 5% of their income to finance the council's activities, which included the expense of holding meetings, and for propaganda campaigns and developing school football in Queensland, New South Wales and New Zealand, all of which were rugby football territories; the size of levies and funds varied throughout the council's history. Changes to the council's laws or rules required a three-quarters majority to pass.

=== Early years ===
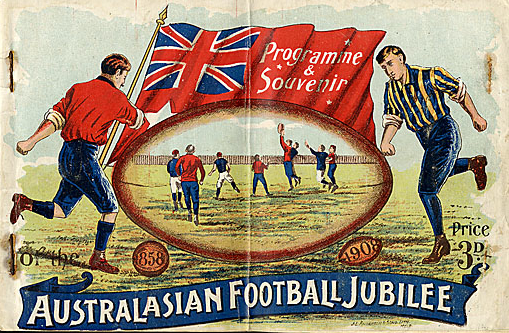
The souvenir programme of the council's inaugural Interstate Carnival in 1908

Among its first orders of business, the Council arranged for the first Interstate Carnival to be held in Melbourne in 1908. Teams representing each state and New Zealand played several matches over a two-week period in August 1908, with Victoria emerging unbeaten as the champion state. Considered a great success, interstate carnivals were held approximately triennially (except during periods of war) until the 1970s, and were the main on-field events for which the council was directly responsible.

In 1911, the SAFL was threatened with expulsion from the council for arranging matches with the unaffiliated VFA. The VFA and SAFL had an existing five-year arrangement for annual interstate matches when the council was established, and that agreement was allowed to stand but could not be renewed without permission; when the SAFL renewed the agreement in 1911, the council issued an ultimatum that the agreement be cancelled or the SAFL would be expelled from the council, and the SAFL acquiesced.

The tenability of New Zealand's representation on the council quickly came into question. A New Zealand team had attended the 1908 Carnival and was the strongest of the three rugby territories; and while the game had proliferated at the amateur and schoolboys' level with New Zealand having spent all of its propaganda disbursements on its junior game, New Zealand's strength as a senior body with council representation was questioned. A motion to exclude New Zealand from the council was raised and defeated in 1910; funding to New Zealand ceased in 1913, with its funds diverted to New South Wales and Queensland; before finally another motion to expel New Zealand was raised and passed in 1914.

In 1914, the Council held a conference with the New South Wales Rugby League, from which preliminary plans were drawn up for a hybrid between rugby league and Australian rules football known as universal football. It was thought that amalgamating with rugby league, rather than trying to supplant it, could be a more effective way to create a nationally popular sport which incorporated the best features of Australian rules football. Progress was made, but the escalation in 1915 of World War I put any efforts to amalgamate on hold; interest in the amalgamation waned after the war and efforts were not revived.

=== Post-war ===
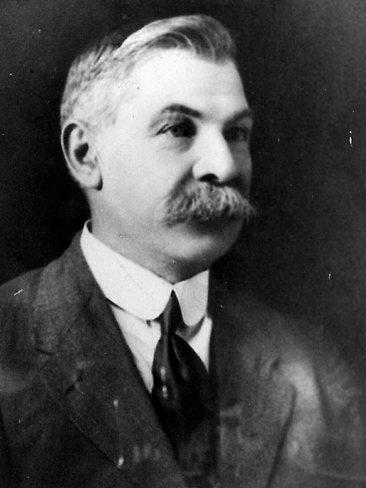
Victoria's Chas Brownlow presided over the council from 1919 until his death in 1924

In 1919, the council met for the first time in five years. At that meeting, the council voted to reduce representation for each state from two delegates to one, deciding that it would be preferable for each state to have only one controlling body. This meant that the Goldfields Football League lost its representation on the council, and in the bitter aftermath it temporarily broke off its relationship with the WAFL, choosing to affiliate with the VFA rather than the WAFL and resulting in the annual Western Australian State Premiership not being contested for the next two years. With the reduction in delegates and the expulsion of New Zealand, the council was reduced to six delegates and its name was amended to the Australian Football Council.

In 1927, Canberra was granted a non-voting position on the council. The city of Canberra was only about fifteen years old, Australian rules football had only been played in Canberra for a few years, and the council had originally intended to let Canberra fall under the New South Wales league's control; but after discussion, the council decided that the game had a chance to prosper in the new city, and that it could be better developed there if it had its own controlling body, rather than a New South Wales body preoccupied with competing with rugby league in Sydney – thus a non-voting delegate was granted. In a rebranding exercise, the council was renamed the Australian National Football Council, and (with the exception of the VFL) the controlling bodies took names ending with 'Australian National Football League' – resulting in the South Australian National Football League (SANFL), Western Australian National Football League (WANFL), Tasmanian Australian National Football League (TANFL), etc.

Through the 1920s and into the 1930s, the council's ability to manage the game was hindered by conservative procedural provisions, so some changes were made to streamline its operation:

- In 1929, in response to the cost and time required to assemble quorate meetings of interstate delegates in a time before commercial air travel, the council determined that motions could be passed in a vote by rotary letter instead of a meeting.
- In 1933, voting rules were amended such that a motion could be carried on a 4–2 majority provided at least two of the three major states (Victoria, South Australia and Western Australia) voted in favour. This had two benefits of giving the major states – who were the main financial contributors to the council – more voting power than the minor states, and in removing the need for a three quarters majority (which required at least 5–1 in favour) to pass motions.

=== Schism era (1940s) ===
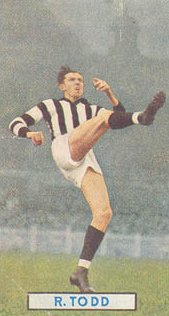
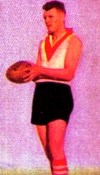
The defection of superstar players like Ron Todd and Bob Pratt to play under different rules in the unaffiliated VFA shaped Council priorities during the 1940s.

Through the late 1930s and the 1940s, the ANFC faced the first serious challenge to its ability to maintain uniform rules and a nationwide permit and transfer system for players, owing to the actions of two unaffiliated bodies: the Australian Amateur Football Council (AAFC) – which was a body similar in structure to the ANFC but in charge of amateur football – and the VFA. The VFA made a bold step in 1938 by making major rule changes which legalised throwing the ball and re-introduced the boundary throw-in, and by aggressively recruiting VFL players without clearances, causing a football schism in Victoria and Tasmania. The AAFC also played with different rules to the ANFC, although its differences were not as significant as in the VFA. This meant three distinct variants of Australian rules football were being played in Victoria, and this lack of uniformity filtered down to developmental levels, with many schools adopting the VFA's rules as a matter of preference, and others adopting the amateur rules due to their close association with their Old Boys' amateur football clubs. This made the ANFC's national administrative role increasingly difficult to carry out, particularly as the schism was centred in the sport's heartland state of Victoria.

Ending this schism was the priority of the ANFC throughout the 1940s, and in 1949 the matter was solved by expanding the council. The AAFC was given a full voting delegate on the council, and the VFA was given a non-voting delegate – the latter owing to the council's reluctance to have separate controlling bodies in the same state. This brought all bodies under the same set of rules, and it brought the VFA into the national transfer system and ended the poaching of VFL players by the VFA and vice versa. Canberra, where the game had made great progress over the previous decades, was also upgraded from a non-voting delegate to a voting delegate in 1949; and the constitution was amended such that a motion could be carried on a simple majority of the eight voting delegates, provided at least four of the five major delegates (Victoria, South Australia, Western Australia, Tasmania and the AAFC) voted in favour.

During this period, the ANFC made a further efficiency improvement with the establishment of a standing committee in 1947. The three-man committee, comprising Melbourne-based delegates from Victoria, South Australia and Western Australia, did not have the power to make changes but did have the power to carry out administrative matters which had previously required full council approval, such as the allocation of propaganda funds.

=== 1950s and 1960s ===
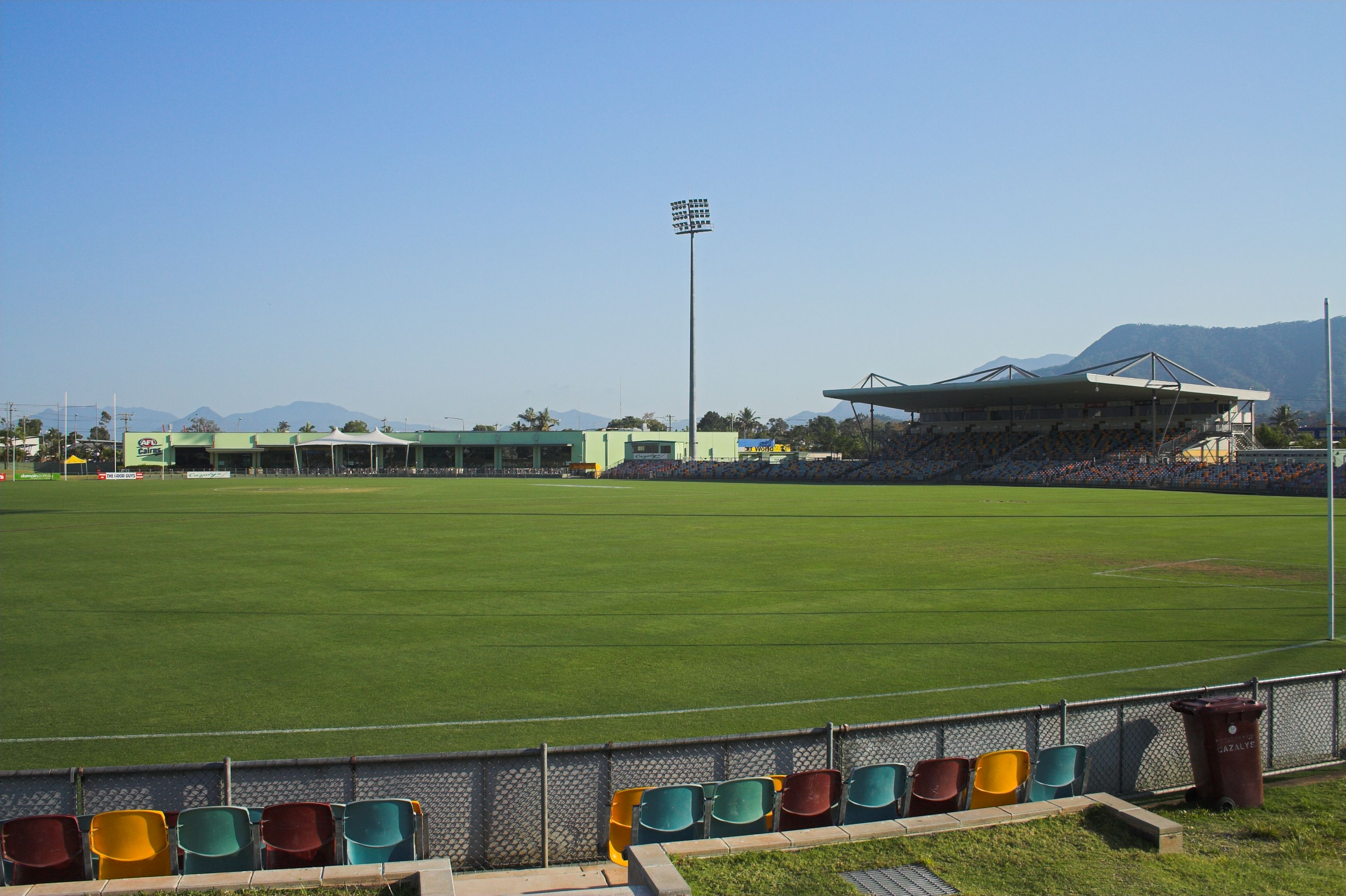
Australian Football Park (now Cazaly's Stadium) in Cairns, Queensland was paid for by the Council in 1957 as part of its nationalisation strategy

The VFA was granted a voting delegate in 1953, bringing the council to nine voting delegates. However, the VFA's time in the council was short-lived following a domestic clearance dispute in Victoria: in 1965, the VFA ceased recognition of VFL clearances in retribution for two takeovers of VFA club grounds by VFL clubs (St Kilda at Moorabbin and North Melbourne at Coburg); then in 1967, the VFL ceased recognition of VFA clearances in retribution for the VFA's introduction of excessive transfer fees on its players. The ANFC initially found itself powerless to stop the clearance war, as it had jurisdiction only over interstate clearances; so a regulation change was approved at the council before the 1969 season to force two Victorian bodies to recognise each other's clearances again. The VFA refused to comply, and after continuing to field VFL players without clearances, it was provisionally suspended from the ANFC in 1969, and formally expelled in March 1970.

=== National Football League era and the Night Series ===
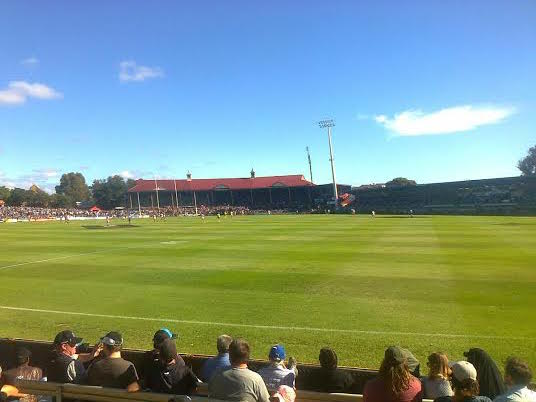
Norwood Oval, then Australia's premier night football venue (but shown here during the day), was central to the NFL's national club competition.

In 1975, the council changed its name to the National Football League (NFL), and embarked on an ambitious plan by establishing the NFL Night Series in 1976. The Night Series was a new competition, played concurrently with the premiership seasons, among twelve clubs from the VFL, SANFL and WANFL invited based on their finishing positions from the previous year. The event was mostly played on Tuesday nights, with night games at Norwood Oval in Adelaide, which was the premier night football venue in the country at the time. The event was the first fully national club competition in Australian rules football; and, as all games were televised live in colour on Channel 9, the event opened unprecedented revenue streams from television rights and sponsorship opportunities for the sport.

The NFL had planned to expand from the twelve-team 1976 competition into a larger competition involving additional teams from the three major leagues and representative teams from the minor states in 1977. However, in November 1976 the VFL withdrew from the NFL's competition, having secretly arranged television and sponsorship deals for its own rival Night Series to be based at VFL Park in Melbourne, where it erected light towers. This act of openly opposing the NFL was met with anger in other states, and resulted in the SANFL ceasing to play matches against the VFL for the next few years (clubs from the two states had often faced each other in practice matches in previous years). To maintain Victorian representation in its Night Series, which was important for its television deals, the NFL invited the top VFA clubs to compete, despite the fact that the VFA was still not affiliated with the NFL, and for three years from 1977 until 1979, the NFL and VFL ran their rival Night Series separately.

The VFL established a proprietary limited company called Australian Football Championships Pty Ltd in 1978 to run its Night Series, and offered shareholdings to the other state leagues in an attempt to completely supersede the NFL's Night Series. The WAFL clubs defected to the VFL's Night Series in 1979, and the SANFL clubs switched in 1980, bringing an end to the NFL's Night Series. This power play, coupled with the election of VFL president Dr Allen Aylett – who had been heavily involved in the rival night series – to the NFL presidency, left the VFL with a more powerful position in national football administration.

=== Final years (1980s and 1990s) ===
In 1981, the Northern Territory Football League was admitted to the NFL as a full voting member, and in 1987, the VFA was re-admitted as a playing but non-voting member of the NFL, with a view to it potentially becoming the controlling body in Victoria if the VFL expanded to become a national league.

In 1988, the nine-man Council board which needed to pass rule changes by supermajority vote was streamlined by establishing a semi-independent five-man commission to make rule changes; such a shift was typical of many football bodies during the 1980s, which had replaced delegate-based boards of management with independent commissions to both streamline and remove club self-interest from decision-making. The new rules commission comprised two VFL delegates, one SANFL delegate, one AAFC delegate and the NFL president.

As the football landscape shifted in the 1980s, the NFL's utility and relevance declined. The relocation of the VFL's South Melbourne Football Club into Sydney to become the Sydney Swans in 1982 gave the VFL a strong influence in New South Wales, and it began to seek recruiting zones and therefore player transfer controls in New South Wales and the ACT, eroding the traditional notion of state controlling bodies.

In 1985, in a bid to stay relevant, the NFL proposed a move of its head office to Canberra, to improve its access to federal sports funding to stay relevant in light of the VFL's expansion to Sydney. The National Football League in 1985 began to advocate for a 12 team national club competition to begin in 1987 as an expansion of the VFL. Much of this masterplan was later followed by the AFL with the notable exceptions being the recommended reduction of Victorian teams and removal of the independent national governing body.

In its final years, the NAFC was instrumental in the establishment and coordination of the International Rules Series between Australia and Ireland in Canberra between 1984 and 1990. The NAFC which was funding junior development to form a pathway to the state leagues was openly critical of the AFL's restructuring of junior leagues focus on a pathway to the elite competition, the NAFC believed that there should be career options for senior players who didn't aspire to play at professional AFL level.

The establishment of Perth's West Coast Eagles and Queensland's Brisbane Bears in the VFL in 1987, and finally the Adelaide Crows in 1991, gave the VFL (which was renamed the Australian Football League (AFL) in 1990) a further national influence. The Silvio Foschini restraint of trade case in 1983, the introduction of the VFL Draft in 1986, increasing professionalism and the consolidation of the AFL as the highest level competition in all states of Australia gradually made much of the NFL's historical interstate player transfer system obsolete. By the end of the 1980s, the VFL was so comfortably established as the pre-eminent national competition and was so wholly self-reliant that the NFL had become powerless to impose any meaningful control over it. The NFL was renamed the National Australian Football Council in 1989, then finally dissolved in 1995. The AFL became independent of its fiduciary relationship to and control by its member clubs in 1993 and in 1995, the AFL took over the operations and roles of the Australian National Football Council and other Australian Football leagues and clubs ceased to have input.

=== Potted history ===
Date	Event
1906	Australasian Football Council established, and comprises fourteen delegates: two each from Victoria, South Australia, Western Australia (one from Perth and one from the Goldfields), Tasmania, New South Wales, Queensland and New Zealand. All changes require three-quarters majority.
1907	Council announces that it will not admit any further delegates from outside of Australia, or tour outside of Australia, and that (excepting New Zealand) funds for international development will be diverted to grow the game in New South Wales and Queensland.
1908	Council coordinates the first major representative carnival with representative sides from all Australian states and New Zealand.
1914	New Zealand expelled from the council.
1919	Each state's representation was reduced from two delegates to one, leaving six delegates: VFL, SAFL, WAFL, TFL, NSWFL and QFL. Western Australian Goldfields representation excluded. Name changed to Australian Football Council.
1927	Name changed to Australian National Football Council. Canberra given a non-voting delegate on the council.
1929	Provision introduced to pass motions by rotary letter, eliminating the need for a quora meeting.
1933	Provision introduced for changes to be approved by a simple majority, conditional on at least two of the three major states (Victoria, South Australia and Western Australia) voting in favour.
1947	Melbourne-based standing committee established to expedite administrative matters.
1949	Full voting delegates given to Canberra and the Australian Amateur Football Council (AAFC), and a non-voting delegate given to the Victorian Football Association. Changes may now be approved by a simple majority, conditional on at least four of the five major delegates (Victoria, South Australia, Western Australia, Tasmania and the AAFC) voting in favour.
1953	VFA given a full voting delegate.
1970	VFA expelled from the council.
1973	Name changed back to Australian Football Council.
1975	Name changed to National Football League.
1981	Northern Territory given a full voting delegate.
1987	VFA re-admitted as a playing member of the council.
1988	A five-member rules committee established and replaced the full council to streamline changes to the laws of the game.
1989	Name changed to National Australian Football Council.
1995	Council dissolved, superseded by the AFL.

== Presidents ==
The following men served as president of the council during its existence:

No.	President	State	Tenure
1	Con Hickey	Victoria	1906–1910
2	John J. Woods	South Australia	1910–1914
3	Albert E. Nash	New South Wales	1914
4	Charles Brownlow	Victoria	1919–1924
5	Alf Moffat	Western Australia	1924–1929
6	Eric Tassie	South Australia	1929–1935
7	Bob Rush	Victoria	1935–1946
8	Wally Stooke	Western Australia	1946–1950
9	Tony Kenny	South Australia	1950–1952
10	Bill Brew	Victoria	1952–1956
11	Pat Rodriguez	Western Australia	1956–1964
12	Perce Mitchell	Victoria	1964–1972
13	Ray Kutcher	South Australia	1974–1978
14	Allen Aylett	Victoria	1978–1985
15	Vince Yovich	Western Australia	1985–1995

Four other notable men who served long periods with distinction in the council in roles with high administrative burden were:

- Con Hickey, who served as secretary of the council from 1910 until his death in 1937
- Thomas Seymour Hill, who served as secretary of the council from 1938 until 1947
- Bruce Andrew, who served as secretary of the council from 1950 until 1976
- Ed Biggs, who served as general manager of the council from 1978 until its dissolution in 1995.

== Delegates ==
=== Queensland ===
- A. Collinson (1906, 1910)
- W. G. Foster (1906)
- A. Becker (1908)
- R. W. Long (1908)
- A. S. Gerard (1910)
- W. Conelan (1928)

=== Victoria ===
- C. M. Hickey (1906, 1908)
- J. Worrall (1906, 1908)
- W. H. Strickland (1910)

=== New South Wales ===
- A. E. Nash (1906, 1908, 1910)
- C. Nitschke (1906)
- E. W. Butler (1908)
- M. Chesney Harte (1910)

=== South Australia ===
- W. K. Harvey (1906, 1908)
- R. F. C. Sullivan (1906, 1908, 1910)
- J. J. Woods (1910)

=== Tasmania ===
- R. Gibson (1906)
- W. H. Gill (1906, 1908 1910)
- E. Burn (1908)
- G. Crisp (1910)

=== Western Australia ===
- E. Udy (1906) (WAFL)
- T. J. Brett (1906, 1908) (Goldfields)
- J. Webb (1908) (WAFL)
- J. J. Simons (1910) (WAFL)
- H. W. Padfield (1910)

=== New Zealand ===
- E. L. McKeon (1906, 1908)
- A. K. McKeon (1906)
- A. H. Tucker (1908)
- J. Callinan (1910)
- W. Tucker (1910)

== See also ==
- AFL Commission
- Australian Amateur Football Council
- Interstate matches in Australian rules football
