= Alf Moffat =

Australian sportsman and sports administrator

President of the Australian Football Council (Note: The council was known as the Australian National Football Council (ANFC) after 1927.)
- In office 5 August 1924 – 4 November 1929
- Preceded by: Chas Brownlow
- Succeeded by: Eric Tassie

Personal details
- Born: Alfred Augustine Moffat; 15 March 1870; Perth, Western Australia
- Died: 8 December 1956 (aged 86); Perth, Western Australia

Alfred Augustine Moffat (Note: Throughout his life, the spelling of his name alternated between "Moffat" and "Moffatt", although he seems to have preferred the former.) (15 March 1870 – 8 December 1956) was an Australian sportsman and sports administrator. He played first-class cricket for Western Australia and Australian rules football for several clubs in the West Australian Football League (WAFL). After retiring from playing, he served as president of the WAFL (Note: The league was known as the Western Australian National Football League (WANFL) after 1930.) from 1920 to 1932, and was also president of the Australian Football Council (AFC) from 1924 to 1929.

== Early life and playing career ==
Moffat was born in Perth in 1870. His father, George Moffat, was a convict who had been transported to Western Australia in 1850 for the crime of forgery. Moffat's first involvement with high-level sport came at the age of 18, when was elected secretary and treasurer of the Victorian Football Club (a WAFA foundation club) for the 1888 season. After a couple of seasons at lower levels, he made his senior WAFA debut as a player in 1891, playing for the newly created East Perth Football Club (no relation to the current club of the same name). East Perth was disbanded at the end of the 1892 season, and Moffat subsequently switched to West Perth. His final club was Rovers, for which he played only during the 1895 season.

Outside of football, Moffat played club cricket (grade cricket) for the West Perth Cricket Club, as a right-arm medium-pace bowler. In early 1893, he was selected for Western Australia's tour of the eastern colonies, which was the first such tour to be organised. Moffat played in his team's matches against South Australia (at Adelaide Oval) and Victoria (at the Melbourne Cricket Ground), both of which would later be granted first-class status. Western Australia lost both matches by large margins, with Moffat going wicketless in the first game and taking a single wicket (that of Harry Stuckey) in the second.

== Administrative career ==
Moffat served as the Perth Football Club's delegate to the WAFL from 1903 to 1919. He was elected president of the league in 1920 (having earlier been a vice-president), and served until 1932, when he resigned due to a dispute over player clearances. Moffat also served as president of the Australian Football Council (AFC), the nationwide governing body for Australian football, from 1924 to 1929. After leaving his more high-profile positions, he remained involved with the sport as president of the West Australian Amateur Football Association (WAAFA).

Moffat died in Perth in 1956, aged 86. He had been made a life member of the WAFL in 1909, a life member of the Perth Football Club in 1910, and a life member of the AFC in 1927. In 2011, Moffat was posthumously inducted into the West Australian Football Hall of Fame. He was cited as "one of the critical fosterers of the early growth of the game in Western Australia".
